= List of film spoofs in Mad =

This list of film spoofs in Mad includes films spoofed (parodied) by the American comic magazine Mad. Usually, an issue of Mad features a spoof of at least one feature film or television program. The works selected by the staff of Mad are typically from cinema and television in the United States.

The authors parody the original titles with puns or other wordplay. Characters are caricatured, and lampooned with joke names.

These articles typically cover five pages or more, and are presented as a sequential storyline with caricatures and word balloons. The opening page or two-page splash usually consists of the cast of the show introducing themselves directly to the reader; in some parodies, the writers sometimes attempt to circumvent this convention by presenting the characters without such direct exposition. This approach was also used for Mad's television parodies, and came to be identified with the magazine. The style was widely copied by other humor publications. In 1973, the promotional movie poster for Robert Altman's The Long Goodbye was designed in the introductory manner of a Mad parody, including the rectangular word balloons with self-referential dialogue; for verisimilitude, the poster was written and drawn by Mad regulars Frank Jacobs and Jack Davis.

Many parodies end with the abrupt deus ex machina appearance of outside characters or pop culture figures who are similar in nature to the film or TV series being parodied, or who comment satirically on the theme. For example, Dr. Phil arrives to counsel the Desperate Housewives, or the cast of Sex and the City show up as the new goomahs on The Sopranos.

The parodies frequently make comedic use of the fourth wall, breaking character, and meta-references. Within an ostensibly self-contained storyline, the characters may refer to the technical aspects of filmmaking, the publicity, hype, or box office surrounding their project, their own past roles, any clichés being used, and so on. In 2013, Film Comment wrote, "While film studies majors gasp over the deconstruction of genre in the works of David Lynch and the meta-movies of Charlie Kaufman, 'the usual gang of idiots' over at MAD have been deconstructing, meta-narrativing, and postmodernizing motion pictures since the very first movie parody (Hah! Noon!) appeared in 1954." (However, that was actually Mad's second movie parody; the first had been Ping Pong three issues earlier.)

Almost all of the parodies are of a single, particular film. However, Mad has occasionally done omnibus parodies of film series, such as the James Bond movies, the 1970s Planet of the Apes sequels, and the Twilight Saga movies. It has also combined multiple mini-parodies of unrelated films into a single article. Some actors and directors have said that they regarded ridicule by Mad as an indication of major success in their careers.

In recent years, the parodies and their creators have been available outside the pages of the regular magazine. The March/April 2013 issue of Film Comment (Film Society of the Lincoln Center) carried Grady Hendrix's historical survey of Mad's film parodies, titled Cahiers du CinéMAD. In August 2016, four of Mad's longtime contributors—editor/artist Sam Viviano, writers Dick DeBartolo and Desmond Devlin, and artist Tom Richmond—appeared at a public symposium in Nebraska to discuss their work in this particular medium. Mad has also published thematic collections of their past spoofs, from Oscar-winning films to superhero movies to gangster films.

In September 2020, with Mad having been reduced to a primarily reprint format, Tom Richmond and Desmond Devlin announced that they were crowdfunding a book of newly created movie parodies called Claptrap. They launched the campaign with the completed two-page opening spread for Star Worse: Plagiarizing Skywalker, a spoof of the ninth film in the Star Wars saga, and the only one that Mad would not do. Published in 2023, the book includes twelve full parodies of older popular or iconic films that Mad had for various reasons opted not to parody at the time, along with a dozen additional comedic movie-themed pieces.

== Film spoofs list ==
=== 1950s ===
Spoofed title	Actual title	Writer	Artist	Issue	Date	Index	Ref
Ping Pong!	King Kong (March 1933) (Genre: Adventure horror monster)	Harvey Kurtzman	Will Elder	6	August–September 1953		
Hah! Noon!	High Noon (July 1952) (Genre: Western)	Harvey Kurtzman	Jack Davis	9	March 1954		
Sane!	Shane (April 1953) (Genre: Western)	Harvey Kurtzman	John Severin	10	April 1954		
From Eternity Back to Here!	From Here to Eternity (August 1953) (Genre: Romantic war drama)	Harvey Kurtzman	Bernard Krigstein	12	June 1954		
Wild 1 (correction) Wild 1/2	The Wild One (December 1953) (Genre: Crime)	Harvey Kurtzman	Wally Wood	15	September 1954		
Stalag 18!	Stalag 17 (July 1953) (Genre: War)	Harvey Kurtzman	Wally Wood	18	December 1954		
The Cane Mutiny!	The Caine Mutiny (June 1954) (Genre: Military trial)	Harvey Kurtzman	Wally Wood	19	January 1955		
Under the Waterfront!	On the Waterfront (July 1954) (Genre: Crime drama)	Harvey Kurtzman	Wally Wood	21	March 1955		
The Barefoot Nocountessa!	The Barefoot Contessa (September 1954) (Genre: Drama)	Harvey Kurtzman	Jack Davis	23	May 1955		
Vera's Cruz	Vera Cruz (December 1954) (Genre: Western)	Harvey Kurtzman	Jack Davis	24	July 1955		
The Blackboard Jumble	Blackboard Jungle (March 1955) (Genre: Social drama)	Harvey Kurtzman	Wally Wood	25	September 1955		
The Prodigious	The Prodigal (May 1955) (Genre: Biblical epic)	Harvey Kurtzman	Wally Wood	26	November 1955	(Note: Doug Gilford's Mad Cover Site – Mad #26)	
The Seven Itchy Years	The Seven Year Itch (June 1955) (Genre: Romantic comedy)	Harvey Kurtzman	Will Elder	26	November 1955		
Ulysses	Ulysses (August 1955) (Genre: Fantasy-adventure)	Harvey Kurtzman	Wally Wood	27	April 1956		
He Rose Tattooed	The Rose Tattoo (February 1955) (Genre: Drama)	Harvey Kurtzman	Wally Wood	28	July 1956		
The Man in the Soot-Gray Flannel	The Man in the Gray Flannel Suit (May 1956) (Genre: Drama)	Harvey Kurtzman	Jack Davis	29	September 1956		
Morbid Dick	Moby Dick (June 1956) (Genre: Period adventure drama)	?	Wally Wood	30	December 1956		
The Bad Seat	The Bad Seed (September 1956) (Genre: Psychological thriller)	Paul Laikin	Bob Clarke	32	April 1957		
O.K.! Gunfight at the Corral!	Gunfight at the O.K. Corral (May 1957) (Genre: Western)	?	George Woodbridge	36	December 1957		
The Wrong Lions	The Young Lions (April 1958) (Genre: Epic war drama)	?	Mort Drucker	41	September 1958		

=== 1960s ===
Spoofed title	Actual title	Writer	Artist	Issue	Date	Index	Ref
The Producer and I	The King and I (June 1956) (Genre: Romantic musical)	Nick Meglin	Mort Drucker	60	January 1961		
Mad Visits John Wayde on the set of "At the Alamo"	The Alamo (October 1960) (Genre: Historical epic war)	Larry Siegel	Mort Drucker	63	June 1961		
The Guns of Minestrone	The Guns of Navarone (June 1961) (Genre: Action adventure war)	Larry Siegel	Mort Drucker	68	January 1962		
If "Mardy" Were Made in Hollywood Today	Marty (April 1955) (Genre: Romantic drama)	Larry Siegel	Mort Drucker	78	April 1963	(Note: Doug Gilford's Mad Cover Site – Mad #78)	
East Side Story	West Side Story (October 1961) (Genre: Romantic musical)	Frank Jacobs	Mort Drucker	78	April 1963		
Mutiny on the Bouncy	Mutiny on the Bounty (November 1962) (Genre: Epic historical drama)	Larry Siegel	Wally Wood	80	July 1963		
For the Birds	The Birds (March 1963) (Genre: Horror-thriller)	Arnie Kogen; Lou Silverstone	Mort Drucker	82	October 1963		
Hood!	Hud (May 1963) (Genre: Western)	Larry Siegel	Mort Drucker	83	December 1963		
Flawrence of Arabia	Lawrence of Arabia (December 1962) (Genre: Epic historical drama)	Frank Jacobs; Stan Hart; Larry Siegel	Mort Drucker	86	April 1964		
Mad Visits the Producer-Director of "Charades"	Charade (December 1963) (Genre: Romantic comedy/mystery)	Larry Siegel	Mort Drucker	88	July 1964		
The Carpetsweepers	The Carpetbaggers (April 1964) (Genre: Drama)	Larry Siegel	Mort Drucker	92	January 1965		
The Flying Ace	Mad's tribute to fighter-pilot films	Dick DeBartolo	Mort Drucker	93	March 1965		
007: The James Bomb Musical	Mad's tribute to James Bond films	Frank Jacobs	Mort Drucker	94	April 1965		
Son of Mighty Joe Kong	Mad's tribute to great ape films	Dick DeBartolo	Mort Drucker	94	April 1965		
Crazy Fists	Mad's tribute to past fight films	Dick DeBartolo	Mort Drucker	96	July 1965		
Cheyenne Awful	Cheyenne Autumn (October 1964) (Genre: Western)	Larry Siegel	Mort Drucker	97	September 1965		
Lord Jump	Lord Jim (February 1965) (Genre: Adventure)	Larry Siegel	Mort Drucker	98	October 1965		
Hack, Hack, Sweet Has-Been or What Ever Happened to Good Taste?	Hush...Hush, Sweet Charlotte (December 1964) (Genre: Psychological thriller) and What Ever Happened to Baby Jane? (October 1962) (Genre: Psychological thriller/Horror)	Larry Siegel	Mort Drucker	100	January 1966		
The Sinpiper	The Sandpiper (June 1965) (Genre: Drama)	Larry Siegel	Mort Drucker	101	March 1966		
Bubby Lake Missed by a Mile	Bunny Lake Is Missing (October 1965) (Genre: Psychological thriller)	Stan Hart	Mort Drucker	102	April 1966		
The Agony and the Agony	The Agony and the Ecstasy (October 1965) (Genre: Historical)	Larry Siegel	Mort Drucker	103	June 1966		
The Spy That Came in for the Gold	The Spy Who Came In from the Cold (December 1965) (Genre: Spy)	Arnie Kogen	Mort Drucker	105	September 1966		
The Bunch	The Group (March 1966) (Genre: Drama)	Arnie Kogen	Mort Drucker	106	October 1966		
The $ound of Money	The Sound of Music (March 1965) (Genre: Musical drama)	Stan Hart	Mort Drucker	108	January 1967		
Who in Heck is Virginia Woolfe?	Who's Afraid of Virginia Woolf? (June 1966) (Genre: Black comedy-drama)	Larry Siegel	Mort Drucker	109	March 1967		
Fantastecch Voyage	Fantastic Voyage (August 1966) (Genre: Science fiction)	Larry Siegel	Mort Drucker	110	April 1967		
The Amateurs	The Professionals (November 1966) (Genre: Western)	Larry Siegel	Mort Drucker	112	July 1967		
Throw-Up	Blowup (December 1966) (Genre: Thriller-drama)	Arnie Kogen	Bruce Stark	113	September 1967	(Note: Doug Gilford's Mad Cover Site – Mad #113)	
Dr. Zhicago	Doctor Zhivago (December 1965) (Genre: Epic romantic drama)	Dick DeBartolo	Jack Davis	113	September 1967		
Is Paris Boring?	Is Paris Burning? (October 1966) (Genre: War)	Lou Silverstone	Mort Drucker	113	September 1967		
Sombre	Hombre (March 1967) (Genre: Revisionist western)	Lou Silverstone	Mort Drucker	114	October 1967		
Grim Pix	Grand Prix (December 1966) (Genre: Auto-racing/Drama)	Dick DeBartolo	Mort Drucker	115	December 1967		
Dirtier by the Dozen	The Dirty Dozen (June 1967) (Genre: War)	Lou Silverstone	Mort Drucker	116	January 1968		
The "Sam Pebbles"	The Sand Pebbles (December 1966) (Genre: Period war)	Stan Hart	Mort Drucker	117	March 1968		
In the Out Exit	Up the Down Staircase (July 1967) (Genre: Drama)	Stan Hart	Mort Drucker	118	April 1968		
Balmy and Clod	Bonnie and Clyde (August 1967) (Genre: Biographical crime)	Larry Siegel	Mort Drucker	119	June 1968		
Blue-Eyed Kook	Cool Hand Luke (November 1967) (Genre: Prison drama)	Stan Hart	Mort Drucker	120	July 1968		
Valley of the Dollars	Valley of the Dolls (December 1967) (Genre: Drama)	Larry Siegel	Mort Drucker	121	September 1968		
The Post-Graduate	The Graduate (December 1967) (Genre: Romantic comedy-drama)	Stan Hart	Mort Drucker	122	October 1968	(Note: Doug Gilford's Mad Cover Site – Mad #122)	
Guess Who's Throwing Up Dinner?	Guess Who's Coming to Dinner (December 1967) (Genre: Comedy-drama)	Stan Hart	Mort Drucker	122	October 1968		
In Cold Blecch!	In Cold Blood (December 1967) (Genre: Docudrama)	Stan Hart	Mort Drucker	122	October 1968		
Can A Lot	Camelot (October 1967) (Genre: Musical comedy-drama)	Frank Jacobs	Mort Drucker	123	December 1968		
Rosemia's Boo-Boo	Rosemary's Baby (June 1968) (Genre: Psychological horror)	Arnie Kogen	Mort Drucker	124	January 1969		
201 Minutes of a Space Idiocy	2001: A Space Odyssey (April 1968) (Genre: Epic science-fiction)	Dick DeBartolo	Mort Drucker	125	March 1969		
Bullbit	Bullitt (October 1968) (Genre: Thriller)	Al Jaffee	Mort Drucker	127	June 1969		
The Guru of Ours	The Wizard of Oz (August 1939) (Genre: Musical fantasy)	Frank Jacobs	Mort Drucker	128	July 1969		
The Brother Hoods	The Brotherhood (December 1968) (Genre: Crime-drama)	Lou Silverstone	Mort Drucker	129	September 1969		
Where Vultures Fare	Where Eagles Dare (December 1968) (Genre: Action adventure war)	Larry Siegel	Angelo Torres	130	October 1969		
Hoo-Boy, Columbus!	Goodbye, Columbus (April 1969) (Genre: Romantic comedy-drama)	Arnie Kogen	Mort Drucker	131	December 1969		

=== 1970s ===
Spoofed title	Actual title	Writer	Artist	Issue	Date	Index	Ref
True Fat	True Grit (June 1969) (Genre: Western)	Larry Siegel	Mort Drucker	133	March 1970		
Midnight Wowboy	Midnight Cowboy (May 1969) (Genre: Comedy-drama)	Stan Hart	Mort Drucker	134	April 1970		
Sleazy Riders	Easy Rider (July 1969) (Genre: Road drama)	Larry Siegel	Mort Drucker	135	June 1970		
Botch Casually and the Somedunce Kid	Butch Cassidy and the Sundance Kid (October 1969) (Genre: Western)	Arnie Kogen	Mort Drucker	136	July 1970		
Boob and Carnal and Tad and Alas	Bob & Carol & Ted & Alice (September 1969) (Genre: Comedy-drama)	Stan Hart	Mort Drucker	137	September 1970		
Moroned	Marooned (November 1969) (Genre: Science fiction)	Dick DeBartolo	Mort Drucker	138	October 1970	(Note: Doug Gilford's Mad Cover Site – Mad #138)	
M*I*S*H M*O*S*H	M*A*S*H (January 1970) (Genre: Military comedy)	Arnie Kogen	Angelo Torres	138	October 1970		
Airplot	Airport (March 1970) (Genre: Air disaster-drama)	Larry Siegel	Mort Drucker	139	December 1970		
A Fistful of Lasagna	A Fistful of Dollars (September 1964) (Genre: Spaghetti western)	Lou Silverstone	Jack Davis	Special #4	Fall 1971		
PUT*ON	Patton (April 1970) (Genre: Biographical war)	Larry Siegel	Mort Drucker	140	January 1971		
Catch-All-22	Catch-22 (June 1970) (Genre: Military comedy)	Stan Hart	Mort Drucker	141	March 1971		
West Coast Story	West Side Story (October 1961) (Genre: Romantic musical)	Frank Jacobs	Jack Davis	142	April 1971		
On a Clear Day You Can See a Funny Girl Singing "Hello Dolly" Forever	On a Clear Day You Can See Forever (June 1970) (Genre: Romantic fantasy)	Frank Jacobs	Mort Drucker	143	June 1971		
Shmoe	Joe (July 1970) (Genre: Drama)	Larry Siegel	Mort Drucker	144	July 1971		
Five Easy Pages... and Two Hard Ones	Five Easy Pieces (September 1970) (Genre: Drama)	Lou Silverstone	Mort Drucker	145	September 1971	(Note: Doug Gilford's Mad Cover Site – Mad #145)	
The Foul and the Prissy Cats	The Owl and the Pussycat (November 1970) (Genre: Romantic comedy)	Stan Hart	Angelo Torres	145	September 1971		
Lover's Story	Love Story (December 1970) (Genre: Romantic drama)	Larry Siegel	Mort Drucker	146	October 1971		
Little Dull Man	Little Big Man (December 1970) (Genre: Revisionist western)	Arnie Kogen	Mort Drucker	147	December 1971		
The Trauma of '42	Summer of '42 (April 1971) (Genre: Comedy-drama)	Stan Hart	Mort Drucker	148	January 1972		
Willies	Willard (June 1971) (Genre: Horror)	Dick DeBartolo	Mort Drucker	149	March 1972		
Carnival Knowledge	Carnal Knowledge (June 1971) (Genre: Comedy-drama)	Larry Siegel	Mort Drucker	151	June 1972		
What's the Connection?	The French Connection (October 1971) (Genre: Dramatic thriller)	Dick DeBartolo	Mort Drucker	152	July 1972		
Dirty Larry	Dirty Harry (December 1971) (Genre: Action)	Arnie Kogen	Mort Drucker	153	September 1972		
The Cowkids	The Cowboys (January 1972) (Genre: Western)	Dick DeBartolo	Jack Davis	154	October 1972	(Note: Doug Gilford's Mad Cover Site – Mad #154)	
The Cute Rook	The Hot Rock (January 1972) (Genre: Comedy-drama caper)	Stan Hart	Mort Drucker	154	October 1972		
The Oddfather	The Godfather (March 1972) (Genre: Crime)	Larry Siegel	Mort Drucker	155	December 1972		
Antenna on the Roof	Fiddler on the Roof (November 1971) (Genre: Musical comedy-drama)	Frank Jacobs	Mort Drucker	156	January 1973		
The Milking of The Planet That Went Ape (The Planet That Went Ape; Underneath The Planet That Went Ape; Escaping From The Planet That Went Ape; Conquering The Planet That Went Ape)	Planet of the Apes franchise (Planet of the Apes (April 1968); Beneath the Planet of the Apes (May 1970); Escape from the Planet of the Apes (May 1971); Conquest of the Planet of the Apes (June 1972)) (Genre: Science fiction)	Arnie Kogen	Mort Drucker	157	March 1973		
The New Comedians	The New Centurions (August 1972) (Genre: Crime-drama)	Dick DeBartolo	Mort Drucker	158	April 1973		
A Crockwork Lemon	A Clockwork Orange (December 1971) (Genre: Dystopian crime)	Stan Hart	George Woodbridge	159	June 1973		
Going Thy Way / Going Way Out	Going My Way (May 1944) (Genre: Musical comedy-drama)	Lou Silverstone	Angelo Torres	160	July 1973		
The Poopsidedown Adventure	The Poseidon Adventure (December 1972) (Genre: Adventure disaster)	Dick DeBartolo	Mort Drucker	161	September 1973		
The Heartburn Kid	The Heartbreak Kid (December 1972) (Genre: Dark romantic comedy)	Larry Siegel	Mort Drucker	162	October 1973		
The Clods of '44	Class of '44 (April 1973) (Genre: Autobiography)	Stan Hart	Mort Drucker	163	December 1973	(Note: Doug Gilford's Mad Cover Site – Mad #163)	
Least Horizon	Lost Horizon (March 1973) (Genre: Musical)	Arnie Kogen	Angelo Torres	163	December 1973		
Caper Goon	Paper Moon (May 1973) (Genre: Comedy)	Larry Siegel	Mort Drucker	164	January 1974		
8 James Bomb Bomb Movies (Dr. No-No; From Russia with Lunacy; Goldfingerbowl; Thunderblahh; You Only Live Nice; On His Majesty's Secret Shamus; Dollars Are Forever; Live and Let Suffer)	The James Bond series (Dr. No (October 1962); From Russia with Love (October 1963); Goldfinger (September 1964); Thunderball (December 1965); You Only Live Twice (June 1967); On Her Majesty's Secret Service (December 1969); Diamonds Are Forever (December 1971); Live and Let Die (June 1973)) (Genre: Spy)	Arnie Kogen	Mort Drucker	165	March 1974	(Note: Doug Gilford's Mad Cover Site – Mad #165)	
American Confetti	American Graffiti (August 1973) (Genre: Comedy-drama)	Larry Siegel	Mort Drucker	166	April 1974		
My Fair Laddie	My Fair Lady (October 1964) (Genre: Musical drama)	Frank Jacobs	Mort Drucker	167	June 1974		
Billy Jock	Billy Jack (May 1971) (Genre: Action-drama)	Stan Hart	Angelo Torres	168	July 1974	(Note: Doug Gilford's Mad Cover Site – Mad #168)	
The Way We Bore	The Way We Were (October 1973) (Genre: Romantic drama)	Larry Siegel	Mort Drucker	168	July 1974		
Serpicool	Serpico (December 1973) (Genre: Crime-drama)	Stan Hart	Mort Drucker	169	September 1974		
The Ecchorcist	The Exorcist (December 1973) (Genre: Supernatural horror)	Larry Siegel	Mort Drucker	170	October 1974	(Note: Doug Gilford's Mad Cover Site – Mad #170)	
Popicorn	Papillon (December 1973) (Genre: Prison drama)	Dick DeBartolo	Angelo Torres	170	October 1974		
The Zing	The Sting (December 1973) (Genre: Caper)	Arnie Kogen	Mort Drucker	171	December 1974		
The Great Gasbag	The Great Gatsby (March 1974) (Genre: Romantic drama)	Stan Hart	Mort Drucker	172	January 1975		
Chinaclown	Chinatown (June 1974) (Genre: Crime thriller)	Larry Siegel	Mort Drucker	173	March 1975		
Death Wishers	Death Wish (July 1974) (Genre: Vigilante action)	Stan Hart	Mort Drucker	174	April 1975	(Note: Doug Gilford's Mad Cover Site – Mad #174)	
The Tommy-Red Seed	The Tamarind Seed (November 1974) (Genre: Romantic drama)	Dick DeBartolo	Angelo Torres	174	April 1975		
What's Entertainment?	That's Entertainment! (May 1974) (Genre: Musical)	Frank Jacobs	Mort Drucker	175	June 1975		
Airplot '75	Airport 1975 (October 1974) (Genre: Air disaster)	Dick DeBartolo	Mort Drucker	176	July 1975	(Note: Doug Gilford's Mad Cover Site – Mad #176)	
The Longest Yardbird	The Longest Yard (August 1974) (Genre: Comedy-drama)	Arnie Kogen	Angelo Torres	176	July 1975		
The Towering Sterno	The Towering Inferno (December 1974) (Genre: Action-drama)	Dick DeBartolo	Mort Drucker	177	September 1975		
The Oddfather Part, Too!	The Godfather Part II (December 1974) (Genre: Crime)	Larry Siegel	Mort Drucker	178	October 1975	(Note: Doug Gilford's Mad Cover Site – Mad #178)	
Muddle on the Orient Express	Murder on the Orient Express (November 1974) (Genre: Mystery)	Lou Silverstone	Angelo Torres	178	October 1975		
Fun Lady	Funny Lady (March 1975) (Genre: Romantic musical, Biographical)	Stan Hart	Mort Drucker	179	December 1975	(Note: Doug Gilford's Mad Cover Site – Mad #179)	
Shampooped	Shampoo (February 1975) (Genre: Romantic comedy-drama)	Arnie Kogen	Angelo Torres	179	December 1975		
Mirthquake	Earthquake (November 1974) (Genre: Disaster drama)	Dick DeBartolo	Angelo Torres	180	January 1976	(Note: Doug Gilford's Mad Cover Site – Mad #180)	
Jaw'd	Jaws (June 1975) (Genre: Thriller)	Larry Siegel	Mort Drucker	180	January 1976		
Rollerbrawl	Rollerball (June 1975) (Genre: Dystopian sports)	Stan Hart	Angelo Torres	181	March 1976		
Dum-Dum Afternoon	Dog Day Afternoon (September 1975) (Genre: Crime-drama)	Larry Siegel	Mort Drucker	183	June 1976		
One Cuckoo Flew Over the Rest	One Flew Over the Cuckoo's Nest (November 1975) (Genre: Drama)	Dick DeBartolo	Mort Drucker	184	July 1976		
Borey Lyndon	Barry Lyndon (December 1975) (Genre: Period drama)	Stan Hart	Mort Drucker	185	September 1976		
Gall of the President's Men	All the President's Men (April 1976) (Genre: Political thriller)	Larry Siegel	Mort Drucker	187	December 1976		
The Bad Mouth Bears	The Bad News Bears (April 1976) (Genre: Sports comedy)	Stan Hart	Jack Davis	188	January 1977	(Note: Doug Gilford's Mad Cover Site – Mad #188)	
The Misery Breaks	The Missouri Breaks (May 1976) (Genre: Western)	Stan Hart	Angelo Torres	188	January 1977		
The Omenous	The Omen (June 1976) (Genre: Horror)	Dick DeBartolo	Harry North, Esq.	189	March 1977		
The Shootiest	The Shootist (August 1976) (Genre: Western)	Dick DeBartolo	Mort Drucker	190	April 1977		
Marathon Mess	Marathon Man (October 1976) (Genre: Thriller)	Stan Hart	Mort Drucker	191	June 1977	(Note: Doug Gilford's Mad Cover Site – Mad #191)	
Sobsession	Obsession (August 1976) (Genre: Psychological thriller)	Larry Siegel	Harry North, Esq.	191	June 1977		
King Korn	King Kong (December 1976) (Genre: Monster adventure)	Dick DeBartolo	Harry North, Esq.	192	July 1977	(Note: Doug Gilford's Mad Cover Site – Mad #192)	
Nutwork	Network (November 1976) (Genre: Comedy-drama)	Stan Hart	Mort Drucker	192	July 1977		
A Star's a Bomb	A Star is Born (December 1976) (Genre: Rock & Roll musical)	Larry Siegel	Mort Drucker	193	September 1977		
Rockhead	Rocky (November 1976) (Genre: Sports drama)	Stan Hart	Mort Drucker	194	October 1977		
Airplot '77	Airport '77 (March 1977) (Genre: Air disaster)	Dick DeBartolo	Mort Drucker	195	December 1977	(Note: Doug Gilford's Mad Cover Site – Mad #195)	
Blimp Sunday	Black Sunday (March 1977) (Genre: Thriller)	Dick DeBartolo	Mort Drucker	195	December 1977		
Star Roars	Star Wars (May 1977) (Genre: Space opera)	Larry Siegel; Dick DeBartolo	Harry North, Esq.	196	January 1978		
The Dip	The Deep (June 1977) (Genre: Adventure thriller)	Stan Hart	Mort Drucker	198	April 1978		
The Spy Who Glubbed Me	The Spy Who Loved Me (July 1977) (Genre: Spy)	Dick DeBartolo	Mort Drucker	199	June 1978		
Clod Encounters of the Absurd Kind	Close Encounters of the Third Kind (November 1977) (Genre: Science fiction)	Stan Hart	Mort Drucker	200	July 1978		
Saturday Night Feeble	Saturday Night Fever (December 1977) (Genre: Dance drama)	Arnie Kogen	Mort Drucker	201	September 1978		
Coma-Toast	Coma (February 1978) (Genre: Psychological thriller)	Larry Siegel	Mort Drucker	202	October 1978		
The Force and I — the Mad Star Wars Musical	Star Wars (May 1977) (Genre: Space opera)	Frank Jacobs	Mort Drucker	203	December 1978		
Jaw'd, Too	Jaws 2 (June 1978) (Genre: Thriller)	Dick DeBartolo	Mort Drucker	204	January 1979		
Cease	Grease (June 1978) (Genre: Musical romantic comedy)	Stan Hart	Mort Drucker	205	March 1979		
The Eyes of Lurid Mess	Eyes of Laura Mars (August 1978) (Genre: Thriller)	Larry Siegel	Angelo Torres	206	April 1979	(Note: Doug Gilford's Mad Cover Site – Mad #206)	
Heaving Can Wait	Heaven Can Wait (June 1978) (Genre: Fantasy comedy)	Stan Hart	Mort Drucker	206	April 1979		
Abominal House	Animal House (July 1978) (Genre: Teen comedy)	Arnie Kogen	Mort Drucker	207	June 1979		
Superduperman	Superman: The Movie (December 1978) (Genre: Superhero)	Larry Siegel	Mort Drucker	208	July 1979		
Invasion of the Booty Snatchers	Invasion of the Body Snatchers (December 1978) (Genre: Science fiction thriller)	Stan Hart	Mort Drucker	209	September 1979		
The Ring and I (Mad Musical)	The Lord of the Rings (November 1978) (Genre: Animated fantasy)	Frank Jacobs	Mort Drucker	210	October 1979		
The China Sin-Dome	The China Syndrome (March 1979) (Genre: Thriller)	Dick DeBartolo	Mort Drucker	211	December 1979		

=== 1980s ===
Spoofed title	Actual title	Writer	Artist	Issue	Date	Index	Ref
Alias	Alien (May 1979) (Genre: Science fiction horror)	Dick DeBartolo	Mort Drucker	212	January 1980		
Moneyraker	Moonraker (June 1979) (Genre: Science fiction)	Stan Hart	Harry North, Esq.	213	March 1980	(Note: Doug Gilford's Mad Cover Site – Mad #213)	
Rockhead II	Rocky II (June 1979) (Genre: Sports drama)	Larry Siegel	Angelo Torres	213	March 1980		
The Calamityville Horror	The Amityville Horror (July 1979) (Genre: Supernatural horror)	Dick DeBartolo	Mort Drucker	214	April 1980	(Note: Doug Gilford's Mad Cover Site – Mad #214)	
The Corncorde – Airplot '79	The Concorde... Airport '79 (August 1979) (Genre: Air disaster)	Dick DeBartolo	Mort Drucker	214	April 1980		
A Crock O' (Blip!) Now	Apocalypse Now (August 1979) (Genre: War)	Larry Siegel	Mort Drucker	215	June 1980		
Star Blecch: The (GACCK!) Motion Picture	Star Trek: The Motion Picture (December 1979) (Genre: Science fiction)	Dick DeBartolo	Mort Drucker	216	July 1980		
Crymore vs. Crymore	Kramer vs. Kramer (December 1979) (Genre: Drama)	Stan Hart	Mort Drucker	217	September 1980		
Mad Magazine Resents Throw Up the Academy	Up the Academy (June 1980) (Genre: Teen comedy)	Stan Hart	Angelo Torres	218	October 1980	(Note: Doug Gilford's Mad Cover Site – Mad #218)	
Being Not All There	Being There (December 1979) (Genre: Comedy-drama)	Larry Siegel	Mort Drucker	218	October 1980		
Gold Mining Daughter	Coal Miner's Daughter (March 1980) (Genre: Biographical musical)	Arnie Kogen	Mort Drucker	219	December 1980	(Note: Doug Gilford's Mad Cover Site – Mad #219)	
Little "Star"lings	Little Darlings (March 1980) (Genre: Teen comedy-drama)	Arnie Kogen	Mort Drucker	219	December 1980		
Star Bores: The Empire Strikes Out	The Empire Strikes Back (May 1980) (Genre: Space opera)	Dick DeBartolo	Mort Drucker	220	January 1981		
The Shiner	The Shining (May 1980) (Genre: Psychological horror)	Larry Siegel	Angelo Torres	221	March 1981		
Undressed to Kill	Dressed to Kill (July 1980) (Genre: Crime thriller)	Arnie Kogen	Mort Drucker	222	April 1981		
The Old Gray Line vs. The New Gray Line	The Long Gray Line (February 1955) (Genre: Biographical comedy-drama)	Lou Silverstone	Angelo Torres	223	June 1981		
Extraordinary People	Ordinary People (September 1980) (Genre: Drama)	Stan Hart	Angelo Torres	223	June 1981		
Raving Bully	Raging Bull (December 1980) (Genre: Sports drama)	Larry Siegel	Mort Drucker	224	July 1981		
Assaulted State	Altered States (December 1980) (Genre: Science fiction horror)	Dick DeBartolo	Angelo Torres	225	September 1981	(Note: Doug Gilford's Mad Cover Site – Mad #225)	
Flopeye	Popeye (December 1980) (Genre: Musical comedy)	Stan Hart	Mort Drucker	225	September 1981		
Superduperman II	Superman II (December 1980) (Genre: Superhero)	Frank Jacobs	Mort Drucker	226	October 1981		
Arbor Day	Typical slasher film satire	Lou Silverstone	Jack Davis	227	December 1981		
(Don Martin's Version of a Movie of) Ecchcaliber	Excalibur (April 1981) (Genre: Medieval fantasy)	Larry Siegel	Don Martin	227	December 1981		
Outlandish	Outland (May 1981) (Genre: Science fiction thriller)	Dick DeBartolo	Angelo Torres	228	January 1982	(Note: Doug Gilford's Mad Cover Site – Mad #228)	
Raiders of a Lost Art	Raiders of the Lost Ark (June 1981) (Genre: Fantasy adventure)	Dick DeBartolo; Frank Jacobs	Jack Davis	228	January 1982		
For Her Thighs Only	For Your Eyes Only (June 1981) (Genre: Spy)	Arnie Kogen	Mort Drucker	229	March 1982		
Deathcrap	Deathtrap (March 1982) (Genre: Comedy thriller)	Dick DeBartolo	Mort Drucker	234	October 1982	(Note: Doug Gilford's Mad Cover Site – Mad #234)	
Death Which-Is-Which II	Death Wish II (February 1982) (Genre: Crime thriller)	Dick DeBartolo	Mort Drucker	234	October 1982		
On Olden Pond	On Golden Pond (December 1981) (Genre: Drama)	Dick DeBartolo	Mort Drucker	234	October 1982		
Conehead the Barbiturate	Conan the Barbarian (March 1982) (Genre: Sword & Sorcery)	Dick DeBartolo	Don Martin	235	December 1982	(Note: Doug Gilford's Mad Cover Site – Mad #235)	
Rockhead III	Rocky III (May 1982) (Genre: Sports drama)	Arnie Kogen	Jack Davis	235	December 1982		
Dumb Kind of Hero	Some Kind of Hero (April 1982) (Genre: Comedy-drama)	Larry Siegel	Mort Drucker	235	December 1982		
Awful Annie	Annie (June 1982) (Genre: Musical comedy-drama)	Larry Siegel	Angelo Torres	236	January 1983	(Note: Doug Gilford's Mad Cover Site – Mad #236)	
Q.T. the Quasi-Terrestrial	E.T. the Extra-Terrestrial (June 1982) (Genre: Science fiction comedy)	Stan Hart	Jack Davis	236	January 1983		
Star Blecch II: The Wreck of Korn	Star Trek II: The Wrath of Khan (June 1982) (Genre: Science fiction)	Dick DeBartolo	Mort Drucker	236	January 1983		
Paltry Guise	Poltergeist (June 1982) (Genre: Supernatural horror)	Arnie Kogen	Jack Davis	237	March 1983		
An Officer Ain't No Gentleman	An Officer and a Gentleman (July 1982) (Genre: Military drama)	Stan Hart	Mort Drucker	238	April 1983		
The Verdiccch	The Verdict (December 1982) (Genre: Courtroom drama)	Stan Hart	Angelo Torres	239	June 1983		
Tootsie Role	Tootsie (December 1982) (Genre: Comedy-drama)	Larry Siegel	Mort Drucker	240	July 1983		
Star Bores: Re-hash of the Jeti	Return of the Jedi (May 1983) (Genre: Space opera)	Dick DeBartolo	Mort Drucker	242	October 1983		
Stuporman ZZZ	Superman III (June 1983) (Genre: Superhero)	Stan Hart	Mort Drucker	243	December 1983		
Psycho, Too	Psycho II (June 1983) (Genre: Psychological horror)	Dick DeBartolo	Mort Drucker	244	January 1984	(Note: Doug Gilford's Mad Cover Site – Mad #244)	
Warped Games	WarGames (May 1983) (Genre: Science fiction)	Larry Siegel	Mort Drucker	244	January 1984		
Staying Awake	Staying Alive (July 1983) (Genre: Drama music romance)	Stan Hart	Jack Davis	245	March 1984		
Flashdunce	Flashdance (April 1983) (Genre: Romantic drama)	Stan Hart	Mort Drucker	246	April 1984	(Note: Doug Gilford's Mad Cover Site – Mad #246)	
Raunchy Business	Risky Business (August 1983) (Genre: Romantic comedy)	Stan Hart	Mort Drucker	246	April 1984		
Trading Races	Trading Places (June 1983) (Genre: Comedy)	Stan Hart	Mort Drucker	246	April 1984		
The Right Stiff	The Right Stuff (October 1983) (Genre: Space adventure)	Dick DeBartolo	Mort Drucker	247	June 1984		
Scarred Face	Scarface (December 1983) (Genre: Crime drama)	Larry Siegel	Jack Davis	248	July 1984	(Note: Doug Gilford's Mad Cover Site – Mad #248)	
Mentl	Yentl (November 1983) (Genre: Musical drama)	Arnie Kogen	Mort Drucker	248	July 1984		
Grimlins	Gremlins (June 1984) (Genre: Horror comedy)	Stan Hart	Mort Drucker	249	September 1984		
Inbanana Jones and the Temple of Goons	Indiana Jones and the Temple of Doom (May 1984) (Genre: Fantasy adventure)	Dick DeBartolo	Jack Davis	250	October 1984	(Note: Doug Gilford's Mad Cover Site – Mad #250)	
Splash-Dance	Splash (March 1984) (Genre: Fantasy comedy)	Arnie Kogen	Mort Drucker	250	October 1984		
Star Blecch III: The Search For Plot	Star Trek III: The Search for Spock (June 1984) (Genre: Science fiction)	Arnie Kogen	Mort Drucker	251	December 1984		
Ghost-Dusters	Ghostbusters (June 1984) (Genre: Supernatural comedy)	Arnie Kogen	Sam Viviano	253	March 1985	(Note: Doug Gilford's Mad Cover Site – Mad #253)	
The Karocky Kid	The Karate Kid (June 1984) (Genre: Martial arts drama)	Arnie Kogen	Harry North, Esq.	253	March 1985		
Purple Acid Rain	Purple Rain (July 1984) (Genre: Rock & Roll musical)	Arnie Kogen	Angelo Torres	253	March 1985		
Supergall	Supergirl (July 1984) (Genre: Superhero)	Dick DeBartolo	Jack Davis	253	March 1985		
Gal of Me	All of Me (September 1984) (Genre: Fantasy comedy)	Dick DeBartolo	Mort Drucker	255	June 1985		
Beverly Hills Cop Out	Beverly Hills Cop (December 1984) (Genre: Action comedy)	Dick DeBartolo	Angelo Torres	256	July 1985		
Witless	Witness (February 1985) (Genre: Thriller)	Stan Hart	Angelo Torres	257	September 1985		
Getcha	Gotcha! (May 1985) (Genre: Action comedy)	Arnie Kogen	Mort Drucker	258	October 1985		
All the Right Movements	All the Right Moves (October 1983) (Genre: Sports drama)	Arnie Kogen	Mort Drucker	258	October 1985		
Classless	Class (July 1983) (Genre: Comedy-drama)	Arnie Kogen	Mort Drucker	258	October 1985		
Hot Dawg - The Movie	Hot Dog…The Movie (January 1984) (Genre: Teen sex comedy ski)	Arnie Kogen	Mort Drucker	258	October 1985		
The Breakfast Bunch	The Breakfast Club (February 1985) (Genre: Teen comedy-drama)	Arnie Kogen	Mort Drucker	258	October 1985		
Flashing Times at Ridgemont High	Fast Times at Ridgemont High (August 1982) (Genre: Teen coming-of-age comedy-drama)	Arnie Kogen	Mort Drucker	258	October 1985		
Caddyshlock	Caddyshack (July 1980) (Genre: Sports comedy)	Arnie Kogen	Mort Drucker	258	October 1985		
Cop Academy	Police Academy (March 1984) (Genre: Comedy)	Arnie Kogen	Mort Drucker	258	October 1985		
Revenge of the Nerdballs	Revenge of the Nerds (July 1984) (Genre: Comedy)	Arnie Kogen	Mort Drucker	258	October 1985		
Primate School	Private School (July 1983) (Genre: Teen sex comedy)	Arnie Kogen	Mort Drucker	258	October 1985		
Pokey's	Porky's (November 1981) (Genre: Teen sex comedy)	Arnie Kogen	Mort Drucker	258	October 1985		
Frisky Business	Risky Business (August 1983) (Genre: Teen coming-of-age comedy)	Arnie Kogen	Mort Drucker	258	October 1985		
Footloosed	Footloose (February 1984) (Genre: Musical drama)	Arnie Kogen	Mort Drucker	258	October 1985		
Zapping	Zapped! (July 1982) (Genre: Teen sex comedy)	Arnie Kogen	Mort Drucker	258	October 1985		
Pokey's Revenge	Porky's Revenge! (March 1985) (Genre: Sex comedy)	Arnie Kogen	Mort Drucker	258	October 1985		
Valley Chick	Valley Girl (April 1983) (Genre: Teen romantic comedy)	Arnie Kogen	Mort Drucker	258	October 1985		
Goofies	The Goonies (June 1985) (Genre: Adventure comedy)	Stan Hart	Jack Davis	258	October 1985		
Dumbo: More Blood Part II	Rambo: First Blood Part II (May 1985) (Genre: Action)	Dick DeBartolo	Mort Drucker	259	December 1985		
Bleak for the Future	Back to the Future (July 1985) (Genre: Science fiction comedy)	Dick DeBartolo	Mort Drucker	260	January 1986	(Note: Doug Gilford's Mad Cover Site – Mad #260)	
Kookoon	Cocoon (June 1985) (Genre: Science fiction fantasy)	Arnie Kogen	Mort Drucker	260	January 1986		
Rockhead IV	Rocky IV (November 1985) (Genre: Sports drama)	Stan Hart	Mort Drucker	262	April 1986		
The Fool of the Nile	The Jewel of the Nile (December 1985) (Genre: Action adventure)	Dick DeBartolo	Mort Drucker	263	June 1986	(Note: Doug Gilford's Mad Cover Site – Mad #263)	
Young Sureschlock Homely	Young Sherlock Holmes (December 1985) (Genre: Mystery adventure)	Dick DeBartolo	Mort Drucker	263	June 1986		
Clown and Lout in Beverly Hills	Down and Out in Beverly Hills (January 1986) (Genre: Comedy)	Stan Hart	Mort Drucker	265	September 1986	(Note: Doug Gilford's Mad Cover Site – Mad #265)	
Henna and Her Sickos	Hannah and Her Sisters (February 1986) (Genre: Comedy-drama)	Debbee Ovitz	Mort Drucker	265	September 1986		
Top Gunk	Top Gun (May 1986) (Genre: Action-drama)	Stan Hart	Mort Drucker	267	December 1986		
Alienators	Aliens (July 1986) (Genre: Science fiction horror)	Dick DeBartolo	Jack Davis	268	January 1987	(Note: Doug Gilford's Mad Cover Site – Mad #268)	
Fearless Buller's Day Off	Ferris Bueller's Day Off (June 1986) (Genre: Teen comedy)	Dennis Snee	Angelo Torres	268	January 1987		
The Karocky Kid Part II	The Karate Kid Part II (June 1986) (Genre: Martial arts drama)	Dick DeBartolo	Angelo Torres	268	January 1987		
Stand But Me	Stand By Me (August 1986) (Genre: Comedy-drama)	Dick DeBartolo	Mort Drucker	269	March 1987		
The Color of Monotony	The Color of Money (October 1986) (Genre: Drama)	Stan Hart	Mort Drucker	270	April 1987	(Note: Doug Gilford's Mad Cover Site – Mad #270)	
Jumbled Joke Flash	Jumpin' Jack Flash (October 1986) (Genre: Spy comedy)	Dick DeBartolo	Mort Drucker	270	April 1987		
Peggy Got Stewed and Married	Peggy Sue Got Married (October 1986) (Genre: Comedy-drama)	Stan Hart	Mort Drucker	270	April 1987		
Star Blecch IV: The Voyage Bombs	Star Trek IV: The Voyage Home (November 1986) (Genre: Science fiction)	Frank Jacobs	Mort Drucker	271	June 1987		
Crock O'Dull Dummee	Crocodile Dundee (April 1986) (Genre: Adventure comedy)	Dick DeBartolo	Mort Drucker	273	September 1987		
Legal Wreckin'	Lethal Weapon (March 1987) (Genre: Action comedy)	Dick DeBartolo	Angelo Torres	274	October 1987		
Beverly Hills Slop, Too!	Beverly Hills Cop II (May 1987) (Genre: Action comedy)	Dick DeBartolo	Mort Drucker	275	December 1987		
Predecessor	Predator (June 1987) (Genre: Science fiction horror)	Dick DeBartolo	Jack Davis	276	January 1988	(Note: Doug Gilford's Mad Cover Site – Mad #276)	
The Unwatchables	The Untouchables (June 1987) (Genre: Crime drama)	Arnie Kogen	Angelo Torres	276	January 1988		
The Wretches of Ecchflick	The Witches of Eastwick (June 1987) (Genre: Fantasy comedy)	Frank Jacobs	Mort Drucker	276	January 1988		
Roboslop	RoboCop (July 1987) (Genre: Science fiction)	Dick DeBartolo	Mort Drucker	277	March 1988		
Dorky Dancing	Dirty Dancing (August 1987) (Genre: Romantic drama)	Stan Hart	Mort Drucker	278	April 1988	(Note: Doug Gilford's Mad Cover Site – Mad #278)	
Stinkout	Stakeout (August 1987) (Genre: Crime comedy)	Dick DeBartolo	Angelo Torres	278	April 1988		
Feeble Attraction	Fatal Attraction (September 1987) (Genre: Psychological thriller)	Stan Hart	Mort Drucker	279	June 1988		
Broadcast Snooze	Broadcast News (December 1987) (Genre: Romantic comedy-drama)	Stan Hart	Angelo Torres	280	July 1988	(Note: Doug Gilford's Mad Cover Site – Mad #280)	
Three Morons and a Baby	Three Men and a Baby (November 1987) (Genre: Comedy)	Stan Hart	Angelo Torres	280	July 1988		
Crock O'dull Dummee, Too	Crocodile Dundee II (May 1988) (Genre: Adventure comedy)	Dick DeBartolo	Mort Drucker	283	December 1988	(Note: Doug Gilford's Mad Cover Site – Mad #283)	
Rambull III	Rambo III (May 1988) (Genre: Action)	Stan Hart	Angelo Torres	283	December 1988		
Biggie	Big (June 1988) (Genre: Fantasy comedy)	Arnie Kogen	Mort Drucker	284	January 1989	(Note: Doug Gilford's Mad Cover Site – Mad #284)	
Numbing to America	Coming to America (June 1988) (Genre: Romantic comedy)	Stan Hart	Sam Viviano	284	January 1989		
Who De-Famed Robber Rabbit?	Who Framed Roger Rabbit (June 1988) (Genre: Animated Fantasy comedy)	Dick DeBartolo	Angelo Torres	284	January 1989		
Crocktale	Cocktail (July 1988) (Genre: Romantic drama)	Dick DeBartolo	Angelo Torres	285	March 1989		
Kookoon: The Rehash	Cocoon: The Return (November 1988) (Genre: Science fiction fantasy)	Dick DeBartolo	Jack Davis	287	June 1989		
Twinge	Twins (December 1988) (Genre: Comedy)	Stan Hart	Mort Drucker	288	July 1989	(Note: Doug Gilford's Mad Cover Site – Mad #288)	
Lurking Girl	Working Girl (December 1988) (Genre: Romantic comedy-drama)	Frank Jacobs	Angelo Torres	288	July 1989		
Battyman	Batman (June 1989) (Genre: Superhero)	Stan Hart	Mort Drucker	289	September 1989		
Grossbusters II	Ghostbusters II (June 1989) (Genre: Supernatural comedy)	Stan Hart	Mort Drucker	290	October 1989		
Inbanana Jones and His Last Crude Days	Indiana Jones and the Last Crusade (May 1989) (Genre: Fantasy adventure)	Dick DeBartolo	Mort Drucker	291	December 1989	(Note: Doug Gilford's Mad Cover Site – Mad #291)	
No Hoax Barred	No Holds Barred (June 1989) (Genre: Professional wrestling)	Stan Hart	Jack Davis	291	December 1989		

=== 1990s ===
Spoofed title	Actual title	Writer	Artist	Issue	Date	Index	Ref
Funny to Shrink the Kids	Honey, I Shrunk the Kids (June 1989) (Genre: Comedy science fiction)	Dick DeBartolo	Mort Drucker	292	January 1990		
Legal Wreckin' Too!	Lethal Weapon 2 (July 1989) (Genre: Buddy cop action comedy)	Dick DeBartolo	Jack Davis	293	March 1990		
Bleak for the Future Part II	Back to the Future Part II (November 1989) (Genre: Science fiction-adventure comedy)	Stan Hart	Mort Drucker	295	June 1990	(Note: Doug Gilford's Mad Cover Site – Mad #295)	
Look Who's Squawking	Look Who's Talking (October 1989) (Genre: Romantic comedy)	Dick DeBartolo	Angelo Torres	295	June 1990		
The Gore of the Roses	The War of the Roses (December 1989) (Genre: Dark comedy)	Dick DeBartolo	Mort Drucker	296	July 1990		
The Hunt For Last October	The Hunt For Red October (March 1990) (Genre: Espionage thriller)	Stan Hart	Angelo Torres	297	September 1990		
Grimlins PTU!: The New Botch	Gremlins 2: The New Batch (June 1990) (Genre: Comedy horror)	Stan Hart	Mort Drucker	298	October 1990	(Note: Doug Gilford's Mad Cover Site – Mad #298)	
RoboCrap 2	RoboCop 2 (June 1990) (Genre: Cyberpunk action-superhero)	Stan Hart	Angelo Torres	298	October 1990		
Teen-Rage Moolah Nitwit Turtles!	Teenage Mutant Ninja Turtles (March 1990) (Genre: Superhero science fiction action comedy)	Dick DeBartolo	Sam Viviano	298	October 1990		
Totally Recalled	Total Recall (June 1990) (Genre: Science-fiction action)	Dick DeBartolo	Mort Drucker	299	December 1990		
Casabonkers	Casablanca (November 1942) (Genre: Romantic drama)	Arnie Kogen	Mort Drucker	300	January 1991	(Note: Doug Gilford's Mad Cover Site – Mad #300)	
Schtick Tracy	Dick Tracy (June 1990) (Genre: Action comedy)	Dick DeBartolo	Angelo Torres	300	January 1991		
Groan with the Wind	Gone with the Wind (December 1939) (Genre: Epic historical romance)	Stan Hart	Jack Davis	300	January 1991		
The Wizard of Odds	The Wizard of Oz (August 1939) (Genre: Musical fantasy)	Frank Jacobs	Sam Viviano	300	January 1991		
Gauche	Ghost (July 1990) (Genre: Romantic fantasy thriller)	Stan Hart	Angelo Torres	301	March 1991		
A Knack For Phobias	Arachnophobia (July 1990) (Genre: Horror-comedy)	Dick DeBartolo	Paul Coker	301	March 1991	(Note: Doug Gilford's Mad Cover Site – Mad #373)	
Die Even Harder 2	Die Hard 2 (July 1990) (Genre: Action)	Stan Hart	Mort Drucker	302	April 1991		
Slutty Woman	Pretty Woman (March 1990) (Genre: Romantic comedy)	Stan Hart	Mort Drucker	302	April 1991		
Days of Blunder	Days of Thunder (June 1990) (Genre: Sports action drama)	Stan Hart	Mort Drucker	302	April 1991		
Flopliners	Flatliners (July 1990) (Genre: Science fiction psychological horror)	Stan Hart	Mort Drucker	302	April 1991		
Dorkman	Darkman (August 1990) (Genre: Superhero)	Stan Hart	Mort Drucker	302	April 1991		
Presumed Impotent	Presumed Innocent (July 1990) (Genre: Legal drama)	Stan Hart	Mort Drucker	302	April 1991		
Home A-groan	Home Alone (November 1990) (Genre: Christmas comedy)	Stan Hart	Sam Viviano	303	June 1991		
Deadwood Scissorham	Edward Scissorhands (December 1990) (Genre: Romantic dark fantasy)	Arnie Kogen	Mort Drucker	304	July 1991	(Note: Doug Gilford's Mad Cover Site – Mad #304)	
The Oddfather Part III	The Godfather Part III (December 1990) (Genre: Crime)	Dick DeBartolo	Angelo Torres	304	July 1991		
Dunces with Wolves	Dances With Wolves (October 1990) (Genre: Epic Western)	Stan Hart	Mort Drucker	305	September 1991	(Note: Doug Gilford's Mad Cover Site – Mad #305)	
The Violence of the Hams	The Silence of the Lambs (February 1991) (Genre: Horror-thriller)	Frank Jacobs	Sam Viviano	305	September 1991		
Teen Rage Moolah Nitwit Turtles II: The Secret is to Snooze	Teenage Mutant Ninja Turtles II: The Secret of the Ooze (March 1991) (Genre: Superhero science fiction action comedy)	Dick DeBartolo	Mort Drucker	306	October 1991		
Hackdraft	Backdraft (May 1991) (Genre: Drama thriller)	Dick DeBartolo	Angelo Torres	307	December 1991	(Note: Doug Gilford's Mad Cover Site – Mad #307)	
Throbbin Hood, Prince of Heaves	Robin Hood: Prince of Thieves (June 1991) (Genre: Romantic action adventure)	Stan Hart	Jack Davis	307	December 1991		
Interminable Too Misjudgment Day	Terminator 2: Judgment Day (July 1991) (Genre: Science-fiction action)	Dick DeBartolo	Mort Drucker	308	January 1992		
The Adnauseam Family	The Addams Family (November 1991) (Genre: Supernatural black comedy)	Dick DeBartolo	Mort Drucker	311	June 1992		
Buggy	Bugsy (December 1991) (Genre: Crime-drama)	Stan Hart	Mort Drucker	312	July 1992	(Note: Doug Gilford's Mad Cover Site – Mad #312)	
Hook'em	Hook (December 1991) (Genre: Fantasy adventure)	Stan Hart	Sam Viviano	312	July 1992		
Prince of Tirades	The Prince of Tides (December 1991) (Genre: Romantic drama)	Dick DeBartolo	Angelo Torres	312	July 1992		
The Ham That Robs the Cradle	The Hand that Rocks the Cradle (January 1992) (Genre: Psychological thriller)	Dick DeBartolo	Mort Drucker	313	September 1992		
Star Blecch V: The Farcical Frontier & Star Blecch VI: The Uninspired Continuation	Star Trek V: The Final Frontier (June 1989) & Star Trek VI: The Undiscovered Country (December 1991) (Genre: Science fiction)	Dick DeBartolo	Paul Coker	Special #83	September 1992		
Basically It Stinks	Basic Instinct (March 1992) (Genre: Neo-noir erotic thriller)	Arnie Kogen	Angelo Torres	314	October 1992	(Note: Doug Gilford's Mad Cover Site – Mad #314)	
Buttman Returns	Batman Returns (June 1992) (Genre: Superhero)	Stan Hart	Mort Drucker	314	October 1992		
Lethal Wreckin' 3	Lethal Weapon 3 (May 1992) (Genre: Buddy cop action comedy)	Dick DeBartolo	Mort Drucker	315	December 1992		
Patr*idiotic Games	Patriot Games (June 1992) (Genre: Spy thriller)	Dick DeBartolo	Angelo Torres	316	January 1993	(Note: Doug Gilford's Mad Cover Site – Mad #316)	
Sister Axed	Sister Act (May 1992) (Genre: Musical comedy)	Stan Hart	Mort Drucker	316	January 1993		
A League to Bemoan	A League of Their Own (July 1992) (Genre: Sports comedy-drama)	Stan Hart	Angelo Torres	317	March 1993		
Home A-groan 2: Loot in New York	Home Alone 2: Lost in New York (November 1992) (Genre: Christmas comedy)	Dick DeBartolo	Mort Drucker	318	April 1993		
Drek-ula	Bram Stoker's Dracula (November 1992) (Genre: Gothic horror)	Dick DeBartolo	Mort Drucker	319	June 1993	(Note: Doug Gilford's Mad Cover Site – Mad #319)	
Blunder Siege	Under Siege (October 1992) (Genre: Action-thriller)	Stan Hart	Angelo Torres	319	June 1993		
A-Lad-Dim	Aladdin (November 1992) (Genre: Animated comedy musical romantic fantasy adventure)	Stan Hart	Angelo Torres	320	July 1993	(Note: Doug Gilford's Mad Cover Site – Mad #320)	
Beauty and the Beef	Beauty and the Beast (November 1991) (Genre: Animated musical romantic fantasy)	Stan Hart	Angelo Torres	320	July 1993		
A Few Goofy Men	A Few Good Men (December 1992) (Genre: Legal drama)	Dick DeBartolo	Mort Drucker	320	July 1993		
Groundhog Deja Vu	Groundhog Day (February 1993) (Genre: Fantasy comedy)	Stan Hart	Angelo Torres	321	September 1993		
A Decent Disposal	Indecent Proposal (April 1993) (Genre: Drama)	Stan Hart	Angelo Torres	322	October 1993		
Dive	Dave (May 1993) (Genre: Comedy)	Arnie Kogen	Angelo Torres	323	December 1993	(Note: Doug Gilford's Mad Cover Site – Mad #323)	
Jurass-Has-Had-It Park	Jurassic Park (June 1993) (Genre: Science-fiction adventure)	Dick DeBartolo	Mort Drucker	323	December 1993		
In Line to be Fired	In the Line of Fire (July 1993) (Genre: Political thriller)	Dick DeBartolo	Angelo Torres	324	January 1994	(Note: Doug Gilford's Mad Cover Site – Mad #324)	
Senseless in Seattle	Sleepless in Seattle (June 1993) (Genre: Romantic comedy-drama)	Stan Hart	Mort Drucker	324	January 1994		
The Stooge-itive	The Fugitive (August 1993) (Genre: Thriller)	Dick DeBartolo	Angelo Torres	325	February 1994		
Mrs. Doubtful	Mrs. Doubtfire (November 1993) (Genre: Comedy-drama)	Stan Hart	Angelo Torres	327	May 1994		
The Flickstones	The Flintstones (May 1994) (Genre: Buddy comedy)	Dick DeBartolo	Angelo Torres	331	October–November 1994	(Note: Doug Gilford's Mad Cover Site – Mad #331)	
Mavershtick	Maverick (May 1994) (Genre: Western comedy)	Arnie Kogen	Mort Drucker	331	October–November 1994		
Fairest Shlump	Forrest Gump (July 1994) (Genre: Romantic drama)	Arnie Kogen	Mort Drucker	332	December 1994	(Note: Doug Gilford's Mad Cover Site – Mad #332)	
The Lion's Kin	The Lion King (June 1994) (Genre: Animated epic musical)	Stan Hart	Sam Viviano	332	December 1994		
Not Quite Up to Speed	Speed (June 1994) (Genre: Action thriller)	Dick DeBartolo	Angelo Torres	332	December 1994		
It's Clear the President is a Danger	Clear and Present Danger (August 1994) (Genre: Spy thriller)	Dick DeBartolo	Angelo Torres	333	January–February 1995	(Note: Doug Gilford's Mad Cover Site – Mad #333)	
Untrue Spies	True Lies (July 1994) (Genre: Action)	Stan Hart	Tom Bunk	333	January–February 1995		
Frankenslime	Mary Shelley's Frankenstein (November 1994) (Genre: Horror drama)	Dick DeBartolo	Angelo Torres	334	March–April 1995	(Note: Doug Gilford's Mad Cover Site – Mad #334)	
Quease Show	Quiz Show (September 1994) (Genre: Historical mystery-drama)	Stan Hart	Mort Drucker	334	March–April 1995		
Intravenous with the Vampire	Interview with the Vampire (November 1994) (Genre: Drama horror)	Stan Hart	Mort Drucker	335	May 1995	(Note: Doug Gilford's Mad Cover Site – Mad #335)	
Plot Friction	Pulp Fiction (May 1994) (Genre: Crime black comedy)	Arnie Kogen	Sam Viviano	335	May 1995		
Buttman Fershlugginer	Batman Forever (June 1995) (Genre: Superhero)	Dick DeBartolo	Mort Drucker	337	July 1995		
Judge Dreck	Judge Dredd (June 1995) (Genre: Science fiction)	Stan Hart	Mort Drucker	338	August 1995		
Gasper	Casper (May 1995) (Genre: Live-action/animated fantasy comedy)	Stan Hart	Paul Coker	340	October–November 1995	(Note: Doug Gilford's Mad Cover Site – Mad #340)	
Die Hard with No Variance	Die Hard with a Vengeance (May 1995) (Genre: Action)	Dick DeBartolo	Drew Friedman	340	October–November 1995		
Appalling 13	Apollo 13 (June 1995) (Genre: Space docudrama)	Stan Hart	Angelo Torres	341	December 1995	(Note: Doug Gilford's Mad Cover Site – Mad #341)	
Hokeyhontas	Pocahontas (June 1995) (Genre: Animated musical romantic drama)	Dick DeBartolo	Walt F. Rosenberg	341	December 1995		
Mr. Hollow's Old Puss	Mr. Holland's Opus (December 1995) (Genre: Drama)	Stan Hart	Angelo Torres	346	June 1996		
Broke 'N' Narrow	Broken Arrow (February 1996) (Genre: Action)	Dick DeBartolo	Mort Drucker	347	July 1996	(Note: Doug Gilford's Mad Cover Site – Mad #347)	
Wishin' for the Impossible	Mission Impossible I (May 1996) (Genre: Action spy)	Dick DeBartolo	Angelo Torres	347	July 1996		
The Nerdcage	The Birdcage (March 1996) (Genre: Comedy)	Stan Hart	Mort Drucker	348	August 1996		
Twit-sters	Twister (May 1996) (Genre: Disaster adventure)	Arnie Kogen	Paul Coker	349	September 1996		
It's Depends Day	Independence Day (July 1996) (Genre: Science fiction action)	Dick DeBartolo	Angelo Torres	350	October 1996	(Note: Doug Gilford's Mad Cover Site – Mad #350)	
It's a Blunderful Life	It's a Wonderful Life (December 1946) (Genre: Christmas fantasy comedy-drama)	Stan Hart	Mort Drucker	350	October 1996		
Disgracer	Eraser (June 1996) (Genre: Action thriller)	Arnie Kogen	Angelo Torres	351	November 1996	(Note: Doug Gilford's Mad Cover Site – Mad #351)	
The Hunchback and Note the Dame	The Hunchback of Notre Dame (June 1996) (Genre: Animated musical drama)	Dick DeBartolo	Sam Viviano	351	November 1996		
The Crock	The Rock (June 1996) (Genre: Action thriller)	Stan Hart	Mort Drucker	351	November 1996		
Star Blecch: Worst Contact	Star Trek: First Contact (November 1996) (Genre: Science fiction)	Dick DeBartolo	Paul Coker	352	December 1996		
Marred Attack!	Mars Attacks! (December 1996) (Genre: Comedy science fiction horror)	Stan Hart	Angelo Torres	353	January 1997		
Rancid	Ransom (November 1996) (Genre: Crime thriller)	Stan Hart	Sam Viviano	354	February 1997		
The People vs. Larry Fylth	The People vs. Larry Flynt (October 1996) (Genre: Biographical drama)	Stan Hart	Angelo Torres	357	May 1997		
Buttman & Rubbin'	Batman & Robin (June 1997) (Genre: Superhero)	Arnie Kogen	Mort Drucker	359	July 1997	(Note: Doug Gilford's Mad Cover Site – Mad #359)	
Howeird Stern, Private Putz	Howard Stern, Private Parts (February 1997) (Genre: Biographical comedy)	Stan Hart	Sam Viviano	359	July 1997		
Corn Air	Con Air (June 1997) (Genre: Action)	Dick DeBartolo	Angelo Torres	360	August 1997		
The Last Word on Jurass-Has-Had-It Park	The Lost World: Jurassic Park (May 1997) (Genre: Science-fiction adventure)	Dick DeBartolo	Paul Coker	361	September 1997		
Corntact	Contact (July 1997) (Genre: Science fiction drama)	Dick DeBartolo	Sam Viviano	363	November 1997	(Note: Doug Gilford's Mad Cover Site – Mad #363)	
F*!@/OFF	Face/Off (June 1997) (Genre: Science fiction action)	Dick DeBartolo	Mort Drucker	363	November 1997		
Air Farce One	Air Force One (July 1997) (Genre: Political action-thriller)	Stan Hart	Sam Viviano	364	December 1997		
G.I. Shame	G.I. Jane (August 1997) (Genre: Action)	Josh Gordon	Angelo Torres	365	January 1998		
Starless Troopers	Starship Troopers (November 1997) (Genre: Military science-fiction action)	Dick DeBartolo	Mort Drucker	367	March 1998		
Alien Resuscitated	Alien Resurrection (November 1997) (Genre: Science-fiction action horror)	Dick DeBartolo	Mort Drucker	368	April 1998	(Note: Doug Gilford's Mad Cover Site – Mad #368)	
Screech 2	Scream 2 (December 1997) (Genre: Slasher/Horror)	Arnie Kogen	Angelo Torres	368	April 1998		
Trypanic	Titanic (December 1997) (Genre: Epic romance-disaster)	Dick DeBartolo	Sam Viviano	369	May 1998		
Gotsilly	Godzilla (May 1998) (Genre: Monster)	Dick DeBartolo	Angelo Torres	370	June 1998		
Sleep Impact	Deep Impact (May 1998) (Genre: Science-fiction disaster)	Dick DeBartolo	Mort Drucker	373	September 1998		
The Ecch-Files: Fight This Feature	The X-Files: Fight the Future (June 1998) (Genre: Science fiction thriller)	Dick DeBartolo	Timothy Shamey	374	September 1998		
The Truedumb Show	The Truman Show (June 1998) (Genre: Satirical science fiction)	Stan Hart	Sam Viviano	374	October 1998		
AHM-A-GETTIN' (The Hell Outta Here!)	Armageddon (July 1998) (Genre: Science fiction disaster)	Arnie Kogen	Angelo Torres	375	November 1998		
Hollow-Scream: It's 2 Slow	Halloween H20: 20 Years Later (August 1998) (Genre: Slasher/Horror)	Dick DeBartolo	Sam Viviano	376	December 1998		
Whattabore	The Waterboy (November 1998) (Genre: Sports comedy)	Dick DeBartolo	Timothy Shamey	379	March 1999		
Flushmore	Rushmore (October 1998) (Genre: Comedy-drama)	Stan Hart	Angelo Torres	380	April 1999	(Note: Doug Gilford's Mad Cover Site – Mad #380)	
Star Blecch: Imperfection	Star Trek: Insurrection (December 1998) (Genre: Science fiction)	Dick DeBartolo	Mort Drucker	380	April 1999		
Playback	Payback (February 1999) (Genre: Neo-noir crime)	Dick DeBartolo	Angelo Torres	382	June 1999		
Satirize This	Analyze This (March 1999) (Genre: Gangster comedy)	Josh Gordon	Angelo Torres	383	July 1999	(Note: Doug Gilford's Mad Cover Site – Mad #383)	
Putz Adams	Patch Adams (December 1998) (Genre: Semi-biographical comedy-drama)	Stan Hart	Bill Wray	383	July 1999		
The Faketrix	The Matrix (April 1999) (Genre: Science fiction action)	Dick DeBartolo	Angelo Torres	384	August 1999	(Note: Doug Gilford's Mad Cover Site – Mad #384)	
Mild Mild Mess	Wild Wild West (June 1999) (Genre: Western action comedy)	Dick DeBartolo	Mort Drucker	384	August 1999		
Detroit Rock Sissies	Detroit Rock City (August 1999) (Genre: Comedy)	Desmond Devlin	Ray Alma	385	September 1999	(Note: Doug Gilford's Mad Cover Site – Mad #385)	
Star Bores Epic Load I: The Fandumb Megamess	Star Wars: Episode I – The Phantom Menace (May 1999) (Genre: Epic space opera)	Dick DeBartolo	Mort Drucker	385	September 1999		
Tarzany	Tarzan (June 1999) (Genre: Animated musical drama adventure)	Dick DeBartolo	Angelo Torres	386	October 1999		
I'm Enterin' Pie	American Pie (July 1999) (Genre: Teen sex comedy)	Desmond Devlin	Ray Alma	387	November 1999	(Note: Doug Gilford's Mad Cover Site – Mad #387)	
Big Bladder	Big Daddy (June 1999) (Genre: Comedy)	Desmond Devlin	Angelo Torres	387	November 1999		
The Bland Witch Project (Profits)	The Blair Witch Project (July 1999) (Genre: Supernatural horror)	Desmond Devlin	Bill Wray	387	November 1999		
Mouth Park: Piggish, Lamer & Uncouth	South Park: Bigger, Longer & Uncut (June 1999) (Genre: Adult animated musical comedy)	Desmond Devlin	Grey Blackwell	387	November 1999		

=== 2000s ===
Spoofed title	Actual title	Writer	Artist	Issue	Date	Index	Ref
The Sick Sense	The Sixth Sense (August 1999) (Genre: Supernatural horror)	Dick DeBartolo	Angelo Torres	389	January 2000		
Double Jerkery	Double Jeopardy (September 1999) (Genre: Neo-noir adventure crime thriller)	Dick DeBartolo	Mort Drucker	390	February 2000		
The Yellow Mile	The Green Mile (December 1999) (Genre: Fantasy crime drama)	Stan Hart	Mort Drucker	393	May 2000		
Errant Bra-on-Bitch	Erin Brockovich (March 2000) (Genre: Biographical drama)	Dick DeBartolo	Mort Drucker	395	July 2000		
Gatorader	Gladiator (May 2000) (Genre: Epic historical drama)	Arnie Kogen	Angelo Torres	397	September 2000		
The Perfect Snore	The Perfect Storm (June 2000) (Genre: Biographical disaster drama)	Dick DeBartolo	Mort Drucker	398	October 2000		
$-MEN	X-Men (July 2000) (Genre: Superhero)	Desmond Devlin	Angelo Torres	399	November 2000		
Mish Mosh Is Possible, Too	Mission: Impossible 2 (May 2000) (Genre: Action spy)	Dick DeBartolo	Hermann Mejía	XL#7	January 2001		
Meek with the Parents	Meet the Parents (October 2000) (Genre: Comedy)	Dick DeBartolo	Angelo Torres	402	February 2001		
Cheesy Angles	Charlie's Angels (November 2000) (Genre: Action comedy)	Dick DeBartolo	Hermann Mejía	403	March 2001	(Note: Doug Gilford's Mad Cover Site – Mad #403)	
Unbearable	Unbreakable (November 2000) (Genre: Superhero thriller)	Dick DeBartolo	Angelo Torres	403	March 2001		
Passed Away	Cast Away (December 2000) (Genre: Epic survival drama)	Arnie Kogen	Mort Drucker	404	April 2001	(Note: "Doug Gilford's Mad Cover Site - Mad #404".)	
Traff-eccch!	Traffic (January 2001) (Genre: Crime drama)	Arnie Kogen	Tom Richmond	405	May 2001		
Cannibal	Hannibal (February 2001) (Genre: Psychological horror)	Dick DeBartolo	Angelo Torres	406	June 2001		
Hurl Horror	Pearl Harbor (May 2001) (Genre: Romantic period war drama)	Arnie Kogen	Angelo Torres	409	September 2001		
A.I.: Absolute Idiocy	A.I. Artificial Intelligence (June 2001) (Genre: Science fiction drama)	Dick DeBartolo	Mort Drucker	410	October 2001	(Note: Doug Gilford's Mad Cover Site – Mad #410)	
Lotta Crotch: Bazoom Raider	Lara Croft: Tomb Raider (June 2001) (Genre: Action-adventure)	Desmond Devlin	Tom Richmond	410	October 2001		
Planet of the Remakes	Planet of the Apes (July 2001) (Genre: Science fiction)	Dick DeBartolo	Ray Alma	411	November 2001		
Harry Plodder and the Sorry-Ass Story/Philistine Story	Harry Potter and the Sorcerer's Stone/Philosopher's Stone (November 2001) (Genre: Fantasy)	Desmond Devlin	Mort Drucker	412	December 2001	(Note: Doug Gilford's Mad Cover Site – Mad #412)	
The Ugghers	The Others (August 2001) (Genre: Gothic horror/Psychological thriller)	Arnie Kogen	Angelo Torres	412	December 2001		
Behind Empty Lines	Behind Enemy Lines (November 2001) (Genre: War)	Dick DeBartolo	Tom Richmond	415	March 2002		
Bored of the Rings: The Feebleschtick of Ka-Ching!	The Lord of the Rings: The Fellowship of the Ring (December 2001) (Genre: Epic adventure fantasy)	Desmond Devlin	Hermann Mejía	416	April 2002	(Note: Doug Gilford's Mad Cover Site – Mad #416)	
No Emotions Eleven	Ocean's Eleven (December 2001) (Genre: Heist comedy)	Arnie Kogen	Angelo Torres	416	April 2002		
A Booty-full Mind	A Beautiful Mind (December 2001) (Genre: Biographical drama)	Dick DeBartolo	Angelo Torres	417	May 2002	(Note: Doug Gilford's Mad Cover Site – Mad #417)	
The Royal Paininthebums	The Royal Tenenbaums (December 2001) (Genre: Comedy-drama)	Arnie Kogen	Tom Richmond	417	May 2002		
Spider-Sham	Spider-Man (May 2002) (Genre: Superhero)	Dick DeBartolo	Tom Richmond	418	June 2002		
Panic Ruined	Panic Room (March 2002) (Genre: Thriller)	Dick DeBartolo	Ray Alma	419	July 2002		
The Scorpion Ka-Ching!	The Scorpion King (April 2002) (Genre: Historical fantasy)	Arnie Kogen	Hermann Mejía	420	August 2002		
Star Bores Epic Load II: Attack of the Clowns	Star Wars: Episode II – Attack of the Clones (May 2002) (Genre: Epic space opera)	Dick DeBartolo	Mort Drucker	421	September 2002		
The Dumb of All Films	The Sum of All Fears (May 2002) (Genre: Spy thriller)	Arnie Kogen	Angelo Torres	422	October 2002		
Minority Retort	Minority Report (June 2002) (Genre: Neo-noir science fiction)	Dick DeBartolo	Mort Drucker	423	November 2002	(Note: Doug Gilford's Mad Cover Site – Mad #423)	
Road to Sedation	Road to Perdition (July 2002) (Genre: Crime drama)	Arnie Kogen	Hermann Mejía	423	November 2002		
Harry Plodder and the Lamest of Sequels	Harry Potter and the Chamber of Secrets (November 2002) (Genre: Fantasy)	Desmond Devlin	Tom Richmond	424	December 2002	(Note: Doug Gilford's Mad Cover Site – Mad #424)	
Designs	Signs (August 2002) (Genre: Science fiction horror)	Dick DeBartolo	Angelo Torres	424	December 2002		
Satirize That	Analyze That (December 2002) (Genre: Crime comedy)	Josh Gordon	Mort Drucker	425	January 2003		
8:Mild	8 Mile (November 2002) (Genre: Hip hop drama)	Desmond Devlin	Hermann Mejía	427	March 2003		
Bored of the Rings: The Two+ Hours	The Lord of the Rings: The Two Towers (December 2002) (Genre: Epic high fantasy adventure)	Desmond Devlin	Hermann Mejía	428	April 2003		
$-MEN2	X2 (April 2003) (Genre: Superhero)	Desmond Devlin	Tom Richmond	430	April 2003		
Interminable 3 Rise of the Bad Scenes	Terminator 3: Rise of the Machines (July 2003) (Genre: Science fiction action)	Dick DeBartolo	Tom Richmond	432	August 2003		
The Faketrix Retarded	The Matrix Reloaded (May 2003) (Genre: Science fiction action)	Arnie Kogen	Hermann Mejía	433	September 2003		
Seebrisket	Seabiscuit (July 2003) (Genre: Sports)	Arnie Kogen	Mort Drucker	435	November 2003		
Fools of Rock	School of Rock (October 2003) (Genre: Comedy)	Dick DeBartolo	Tom Richmond	438	February 2004		
Masochist Commander: On the Farce Side of the World	Master and Commander: The Far Side of the World (November 2003) (Genre: Epic period war-drama)	Arnie Kogen	Angelo Torres	439	March 2004		
Bored of the Rings: Rehash of the Thing	The Lord of the Rings: The Return of the King (December 2003) (Genre: Epic high fantasy adventure)	Desmond Devlin	Hermann Mejía	440	April 2004		
Harry Plodder and the Pre-Teen Nerds are Actin' Bad	Harry Potter and the Prisoner of Azkaban (May 2004) (Genre: Fantasy)	Desmond Devlin	Hermann Mejía	443	July 2004		
Troy-Vey!	Troy (May 2004) (Genre: Epic historical war)	Arnie Kogen	Mort Drucker	445	September 2004	(Note: Doug Gilford's Mad Cover Site – Mad #445)	
Van Helstink	Van Helsing (May 2004) (Genre: Dark fantasy action)	Dick DeBartolo	Tom Richmond	445	September 2004		
Spider-Sham Too	Spider-Man 2 (June 2004) (Genre: Superhero)	Dick DeBartolo	Tom Richmond	446	October 2004		
Constant-Theme	Constantine (February 2005) (Genre: Superhero horror)	Desmond Devlin	Hermann Mejía	451	March 2005		
Limited Thickwit's A Series of Uneventful Misfortunes	Lemony Snicket's A Series of Unfortunate Events (December 2004) (Genre: Gothic dark fantasy comedy)	Desmond Devlin	Hermann Mejía	452	April 2005	(Note: Doug Gilford's Mad Cover Site – Mad #452)	
Repeat the Fock-Ups	Meet the Fockers (December 2004) (Genre: Comedy)	Dick DeBartolo	Angelo Torres	452	April 2005		
Battyman, Begone!	Batman Begins (June 2005) (Genre: Superhero)	Desmond Devlin	Tom Richmond	455	July 2005		
Star Bores Epic Load III: Retread of the Sh* t!	Star Wars: Episode III – Revenge of the Sith (May 2005) (Genre: Epic space opera)	David Shayne	Hermann Mejía	456	August 2005		
Bore of the Worlds	War of the Worlds (June 2005) (Genre: Science fiction horror)	Arnie Kogen	Mort Drucker	458	October 2005		
Harry Plodder Has Gotta Retire	Harry Potter and the Goblet of Fire (November 2005) (Genre: Fantasy)	Desmond Devlin	Hermann Mejía	460	December 2005		
King Korn!	King Kong (December 2005) (Genre: Epic monster adventure)	Dick DeBartolo	Hermann Mejía	464	April 2006		
Barebutt Mountain	Brokeback Mountain (December 2005) (Genre: Neo-Western romantic drama)	Arnie Kogen	Tom Richmond	465	May 2006		
Stuporman Reruns!	Superman Returns (June 2006) (Genre: Superhero)	Dick DeBartolo	Tom Richmond	468	August 2006		
The Da Vinci Coma	The Da Vinci Code (May 2006) (Genre: Mystery thriller)	Dick DeBartolo	Mort Drucker	469	September 2006	(Note: Doug Gilford's Mad Cover Site – Mad #469)	
Mission: Implausible 3	Mission: Impossible III (May 2006) (Genre: Action spy)	Arnie Kogen	Hermann Mejía	469	September 2006		
Harry Plodder and the Torture of the Fanbase	Harry Potter and the Order of the Phoenix (July 2007) (Genre: Fantasy)	Desmond Devlin	Tom Richmond	480	August 2007		
Spider-Sham 3	Spider-Man 3 (May 2007) (Genre: Superhero)	Arnie Kogen	Hermann Mejía	481	September 2007	(Note: Doug Gilford's Mad Cover Site – Mad #481)	
Boo!	300 (March 2007) (Genre: Epic historical action)	Desmond Devlin	Mort Drucker	481	September 2007		
American Gagster	American Gangster (October 2007) (Genre: Biographical crime)	Arnie Kogen	Mort Drucker	487	March 2008	(Note: Doug Gilford's Mad Cover Site – Mad #487)	
Ironic, Man	Iron Man (May 2008) (Genre: Superhero)	Desmond Devlin	Tom Richmond	492	August 2008		
Inadiaper Jones and the Kingdom of the Creative Dry Spell	Indiana Jones and the Kingdom of the Crystal Skull (May 2008) (Genre: Action adventure)	Arnie Kogen	Hermann Mejía	493	September 2008		
The Chronic-Ills of Yawnia: Prince Thespian	The Chronicles of Narnia: Prince Caspian (May 2008) (Genre: High fantasy)	Dick DeBartolo	Mort Drucker	493	September 2008		
The Dork Knight	The Dark Knight (July 2008) (Genre: Superhero)	Desmond Devlin	Tom Richmond	495	November 2008		
Botchmen	Watchmen (March 2009) (Genre: Superhero)	Desmond Devlin	Tom Richmond	499	April 2009		
Harry Plodder is a Hot-Blooded Putz	Harry Potter and the Half Blood Prince (July 2009) (Genre: Fantasy)	Desmond Devlin	Hermann Mejía	501	August 2009	(Note: "Doug Gilford's Mad Cover Site - Mad #501". madcoversite.)	

=== 2010s ===
Spoofed title	Actual title	Writer	Artist	Issue	Date	Index	Ref
Toyota Story	Toy Story (November 1995) (Genre: Animated comedy)	Desmond Devlin	Tom Richmond	504	August 31, 2010		
The Wizard of O	The Wizard of Oz (August 1939) (Genre: Musical fantasy)	Desmond Devlin	Tom Richmond	505	October 12, 2010	(Note: 2010 August 03 On the Stands: MAD #505 | Tom's MAD Blog!)	
Harry Plodder and It's Dreadful What Follows	Harry Potter and the Deathly Hallows – Part 1 (November 2010) (Genre: Fantasy)	Desmond Devlin	Tom Richmond	507	February 10, 2011		
Green Lunkhead	Green Lantern (June 2011) (Genre: Superhero)	Desmond Devlin	Tom Richmond	510	August 11, 2011		
Harry Plodder is Definitely Halted – Adieu!	Harry Potter and the Deathly Hallows – Part 2 (July 2011) (Genre: Fantasy)	Desmond Devlin	Hermann Mejía	Special issue	September 23, 2011	(Note: Harry Potter Special issue| Tom's MAD Blog!)	
The Hunger Pains	The Hunger Games (March 2012) (Genre: Science fiction-adventure)	Desmond Devlin	Tom Richmond	515	June 6, 2012		
The ScAvengers	The Avengers (May 2012) (Genre: Superhero)	Dick DeBartolo	Tom Richmond	517	August 8, 2012		
The Toilet Saga (Toilet; New Gloom; Weakscripts; Sulking Yawn Part 1; Bleak and Dumb Part 2)	The Twilight Saga (Twilight (November 2008); New Moon (November 2009); Eclipse (June 2010); Breaking Dawn Part 1 (November 2011); Breaking Dawn Part 2 (November 2012)) (Genre: Romantic drama fantasy)	Desmond Devlin	Anton Emdin	518	December 12, 2012		
The Dork Knight Reprises	The Dark Knight Rises (July 2012) (Genre: Superhero)	Arnie Kogen	Tom Richmond	519	February 2013		
Casebook "Spyfail" – The Battle of the Bonds (Cash-in Royale; Quantum of Silliness; Spyfail)	Casino Royale (November 2006), Quantum of Solace (October 2008), Skyfall (November 2012)) (Genre: Spy)	Desmond Devlin	Tom Richmond	521	June 2013		
The Slobbit: An Underedited Journey	The Hobbit: An Unexpected Journey (December 2012) (Genre: Epic high fantasy adventure)	Desmond Devlin	Tom Richmond	522	July 12, 2013		
Man of Veal	Man of Steel (June 2013) (Genre: Superhero)	Desmond Devlin	Tom Richmond	524	December 2013		
The Hunger Pains: Getting Tired	The Hunger Games: Catching Fire (November 2013) (Genre: Dystopian science fiction adventure)	Desmond Devlin	Tom Richmond	526	April 2014		
The Slobbit: The Adaptation's a Slog	The Hobbit: The Desolation of Smaug (December 2013) (Genre: Epic high fantasy adventure)	Desmond Devlin	Tom Richmond	527	June 2014		
American Sniping	American Sniper (November 2014) (Genre: Biographical war drama)	David Shayne	Tom Richmond	533	June 2015		
The Slobbit: Still Banal After Five Movies	The Hobbit: The Battle of the Five Armies (December 2014) (Genre: Epic high fantasy action)	Desmond Devlin	Tom Richmond	Special issue distributed by Loot Crate	May 2015		
ScAvengers: Age of Moron	Avengers: Age of Ultron (April 2015) (Genre: Superhero)	Desmond Devlin	Tom Richmond	535	October 2015		
The Hunger Pains: Much Delay - Parts 1 & 2	The Hunger Games: Mockingjay – Part 1 (November 2014), The Hunger Games: Mockingjay – Part 2 (November 2015) (Genre: Dystopian science fiction adventure)	Desmond Devlin	Tom Richmond	538	April 2016		
Star Bores: The Snores Awaken	Star Wars: The Force Awakens (December 2015) (Genre: Epic space opera)	David Shayne	Tom Richmond	539	June 2016		
Battyman v Stuporman: Dumb and Joyless	Batman v Superman: Dawn of Justice (March 2016) (Genre: Superhero)	Desmond Devlin	Tom Richmond	540	August 2016		
Silly	Sully (September 2016) (Genre: Biographical drama)	Dick DeBartolo	Tom Richmond	543	February 2017		
Fanatic Dweebs and How to Fleece Them	Fantastic Beasts and Where to Find Them (November 2016) (Genre: Fantasy)	Desmond Devlin	Anton Emdin	544	April 2017		
Rough One: A Star Bores Snorer	Rogue One: A Star Wars Story (December 2016) (Genre: Epic space opera)	David Richards	Tom Richmond	545	June 2017		
Star Bores: Half-Assed Jedi	Star Wars: The Last Jedi (December 2017) (Genre: Epic space opera)	Desmond Devlin	Tom Richmond	1	June 2018		
Xander and Kam's Sneaky Previews	Incredibles 2 (June 2018) (Genre: Animated superhero)	Ian Boothby	Tom Richmond	2	August 2018		
Xander and Kam's Sneaky Previews	Ocean's 8 (June 2018) (Genre: Heist comedy)	Ian Boothby	Tom Richmond	2	August 2018		
Xander and Kam's Sneaky Previews	Jurassic World: Fallen Kingdom (May 2018) (Genre: Science fiction adventure)	Ian Boothby	Tom Richmond	2	August 2018		
Xander and Kam's Sneaky Previews	Solo: A Star Wars Story (May 2018) (Genre: Space Western)	Ian Boothby	Tom Richmond	2	August 2018		
Xander and Kam's Sneaky Previews	Deadpool 2 (May 2018) (Genre: Superhero)	Ian Boothby	Tom Richmond	2	August 2018		
Messy Layered One	Ready Player One (March 2018) (Genre: Science fiction adventure)	Desmond Devlin	Tom Richmond	3	October 2018		
A Listless Story	A Christmas Story (November 1983) (Genre: Christmas comedy)	Desmond Devlin	Tom Richmond	5	February 2019		
Merry Poopins Visits the White House	Mary Poppins/Mary Poppins Returns (August 1964/December 2018) (Genre: Musical fantasy)	Ian Boothby	Tom Richmond	6	April 2019		
Awkward, Man!	Aquaman (November 2018) (Genre: Superhero)	Desmond Devlin	Tom Richmond	7	June 2019		
Avenjerks: Is This Ever Gonna End-Game?	Avengers: Endgame (April 2019) (Genre: Superhero)	Ian Boothby	Gideon Kendall	7	June 2019		
Silly Wonky & The Town of Flavor	Willy Wonka & the Chocolate Factory (June 1971) (Genre: Musical fantasy family)	Alec Owen	Tom Richmond	8	August 2019		
Lousy Law	Once Upon a Time in Hollywood (May 2019) (Genre: Comedy drama)	Andrew Secunda	Tom Richmond	9	October 2019		
Xander and Kam's Night of the Living Sequels!	It Chapter Two (August 2019) (Genre: Supernatural horror)	Ian Boothby	Tom Richmond	10	December 2019		
Xander and Kam's Night of the Living Sequels!	Annabelle Comes Home (June 2019) (Genre: Supernatural horror)	Ian Boothby	Tom Richmond	10	December 2019		
Xander and Kam's Night of the Living Sequels!	Doctor Sleep (October 2019) (Genre: Horror)	Ian Boothby	Tom Richmond	10	December 2019		

=== 2020s ===
Spoofed title	Actual title	Writer	Artist	Issue	Date	Index	Ref
The Bathroom	The Batman (March 2022) (Genre: Superhero)	Desmond Devlin	Tom Richmond	28	December 2022		
The Fascist and the Feeblest	The Fast and the Furious (June 2001) (Genre: Action/Crime)	Desmond Devlin	Tom Richmond	40	December 2024		
The Schlubstance	The Substance (September 2024) (Genre: Body horror)	Paula Sevenbergen	Hermann Mejía	42	April 2025		
The Devil Cares Nada	The Devil Wears Prada/The Devil Wears Prada 2 (June 2006/May 2026) (Genre: Comedy drama)	Desmond Devlin	Tom Richmond	601	October 2026		

=== 2023 (Claptrap) ===
Spoofed title	Actual title	Writer	Artist	Index	Ref
Star Worse: Plagiarizing Skywalker	Star Wars: The Rise of Skywalker (December 2019) (Genre: Epic space opera)	Desmond Devlin	Tom Richmond		
The Surestank Religion	The Shawshank Redemption (September 1994) (Genre: Prison drama)	Desmond Devlin	Tom Richmond	(Note: Another CLAPTRAP Splash Page Reveal! | Tom's MAD Blog!)	
Type O	Psycho (September 1960) (Genre: Horror)	Desmond Devlin	Tom Richmond	(Note: Another CLAPTRAP Parody Reveal… Psycho! | Tom's MAD Blog!)	
GoodFelons	Goodfellas (September 1990) (Genre: Biographical crime drama)	Desmond Devlin	Tom Richmond	(Note: Do We Amuse you? | Tom's MAD Blog!)	
Les Inconceivables: The Princess Bride Musical	The Princess Bride (September 1987) (Genre: Fantasy adventure comedy)	Desmond Devlin	Tom Richmond	(Note: Final CLAPTRAP Film Parody Announced! | Tom's MAD Blog!)	
Oy, Story 4?	Toy Story 4 (June 2019) (Genre: Animated comedy-drama)	Desmond Devlin	Tom Richmond		
Brain Dumber	Blade Runner (June 1982) (Genre: Science fiction)	Desmond Devlin	Tom Richmond		
Cinema's King	Citizen Kane (May 1941) (Genre: Drama)	Desmond Devlin	Tom Richmond		
The Blues Blunder	The Blues Brothers (June 1980) (Genre: Musical action comedy)	Desmond Devlin	Tom Richmond		
Try Hard	Die Hard (July 1988) (Genre: Action thriller)	Desmond Devlin	Tom Richmond		
The Big Lowbrowski	The Big Lebowski (January 1998) (Genre: Crime comedy)	Desmond Devlin	Tom Richmond		
Underwritten	Unforgiven (August 1992) (Genre: Western)	Desmond Devlin	Tom Richmond		

== See also ==
- List of television show spoofs in Mad
- Mad (magazine)
