= Mort Drucker =

American caricaturist and comics artist (1929–2020)

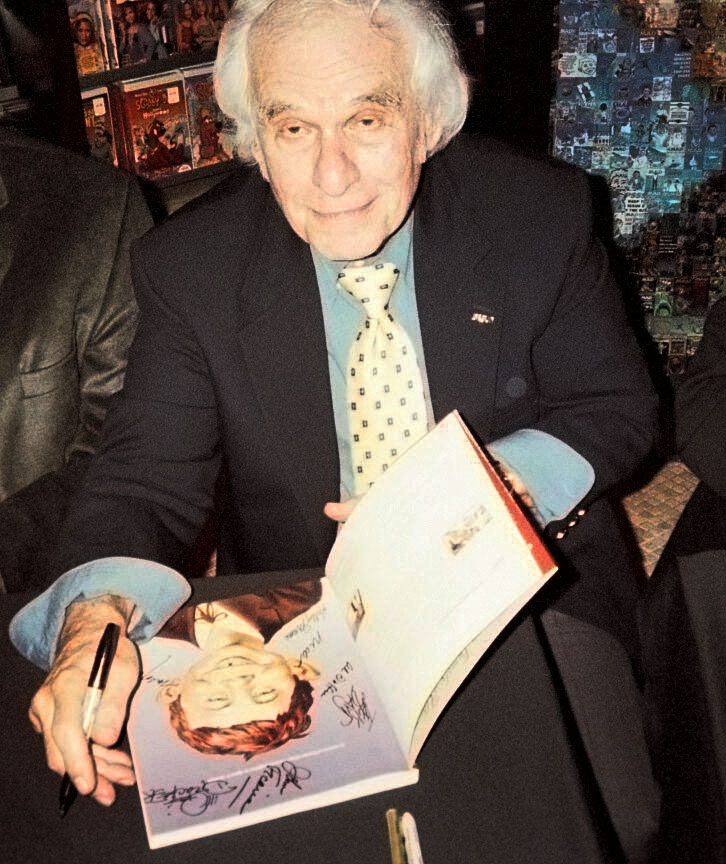
- Drucker in November 2000
- Born: Morris Drucker; March 22, 1929 New York City, New York, U.S.
- Died: April 9, 2020 (aged 91) Woodbury, New York, U.S.
- Areas: Cartoonist, artist
- Notable works: Mad

Morris "Mort" Drucker (March 22, 1929 – April 9, 2020) was an American caricaturist and comics artist best known as a contributor for over five decades in Mad, where he specialized in satires on the leading feature films and television series.

== Personal life ==
Drucker was born in Brooklyn, New York City, with some sources listing his birth date as March 22, 1929, and others as March 29. He was the son of Sarah (Spielvogel), a homemaker, and Edward Drucker, a businessman. His family was Jewish. He attended Brooklyn's Erasmus Hall High School. There he met his future wife Barbara, whom he married shortly after her graduation. The couple moved to Long Island, living in Syosset, where they brought up two daughters, Laurie and Melanie; their family eventually expanded with three grandchildren.

== Career ==
Drucker entered the comics field by assisting Bert Whitman on the Publishers-Hall newspaper comic strip Debbie Dean in 1947 when he was 18, based on a recommendation from Will Eisner. He then joined the staff of National Periodical Publications (DC Comics), where he worked as a retoucher. While at DC, Drucker also ghosted "The Mountain Boys", Paul Webb's regular gag panel for Esquire magazine. Early in the 1950s, Drucker left his DC staff gig and began doing full-time freelance work for a number of comic book publishers such as Dell, Atlas and St. John's, as well as several humor and war titles for his former employer.

=== Mad ===
In the fall of 1956, shortly after the departure of Mad's founding editor Harvey Kurtzman, Drucker found his way to Mad. His first visit to the magazine's offices coincided with a World Series broadcast, and publisher Bill Gaines told Drucker that if the Brooklyn Dodgers won the game, he would be given a drawing assignment. The Dodgers won. Capricious though Drucker's alleged audition process may have been, it was a good anecdote. Years later, Gaines unsurprisingly confessed, "We would have hired him anyway."

Drucker had arrived at the Mad offices with pages from his Hopalong Cassidy comic book work for DC Comics and some of his "Mountain Boys" strips, as well as a humorous "little situation" featuring The Lone Ranger and Tonto that he had specifically drawn for the interview. Though this work was unlike the likenesses and continuities he would become best known for, the Mad staff reacted favorably. The first to review Drucker's portfolio was Mad associate editor Nick Meglin, who admitted, "I didn't spot how great he was at caricatures. Not at first. But then, he wasn't that great then." Drucker said that he "just wanted to be an artist ... to get paid for drawing anything," and only started focusing on caricature work, because he started getting more of those assignments. "That's when I realized I'd found my calling," said Drucker. At the time of Drucker's arrival, Mad did not regularly feature television and movie satires. Editor Al Feldstein credited Drucker's style and ability for the decision to start featuring them in every issue.

For well over a decade, Mad had difficulty obtaining promotional photos that Drucker could use as source material for his drawings. When he was illustrating Mad parodies, Drucker's colleague Angelo Torres brought a camera into movie theaters and snapped pictures of the screen. Eventually, a generation of Mad fans grew up and some became Hollywood publicists, making Drucker's research easier.

By the time he wound down his Mad career 55 years later, Drucker held the longest uninterrupted tenure of any Mad artist. Drucker has the most bylined articles by any Mad artist who does not also write his own material, with more than 400.

=== Other work ===
Drucker also remained active for DC, illustrating War Stories, among other titles. Beginning in 1959, he spent four years drawing DC's The Adventures of Bob Hope comic book. Drucker credits this stint as a key moment in his career because it focused his work on caricature.

In 1962, Drucker teamed with the prolific humor writer Paul Laikin on the highly successful JFK Coloring Book (Kanrom Publishers), which sold 2,500,000 copies. Two decades later, Drucker illustrated similar coloring books on Ollie North and Ronald Reagan. His film posters include Universal's American Graffiti (1973), directed by George Lucas with Drucker also drawing the high school yearbook pictures in the film trailer.

Drucker also pursued assignments in television animation, movie poster art and magazine illustration, including covers for Time, some of which are in the National Portrait Gallery of the Smithsonian Institution. His album covers include art for the pop band The Bears and the Anthrax album State of Euphoria, as well as humor albums in the vein of his own "JFK Coloring Book" including "The LBJ Menagerie" and "The New First Family, 1968". In addition to books collecting his own work, he has provided illustrations for numerous books by others, including children's books, humor books and satire. He drew the prop cartoons used in the 1957 Broadway musical comedy, Rumple.

Between 1984 and 1987, Drucker collaborated with Jerry Dumas (and John Reiner) on the daily comic strip Benchley. Set in the White House, the plot revolved around the fictive character Benchley who acted as the assistant and admirer of contemporary president Ronald Reagan. Dumas commented, "Nobody ever did a strip about the government. It's a wonderful place to set a strip. There's so much room for humor in the White House." Benchley was syndicated by the Register and Tribune Syndicate.

In 1990, Drucker designed the Supercup for Target. The following year, for the United Fresh Fruit and Vegetable Association, Drucker and executive Mitchell Erick created the Frugies (pronounced fru-jees) to promote June as National Fresh Fruit and Vegetable Month. The campaign included such characters as Auntie Broccoli, Lord Mushroom, Pepe L'Pepper, E. J. Cobb, Peach Velour, Penelope Pear and Adam Apple.

== Style ==
In 2012, Drucker discussed his art style, and how he applied it to his Mad assignments:

I've always considered a caricature to be the complete person, not just a likeness. Hands, in particular, have always been a prime focus for me as they can be as expressive of character as the exaggerations and distortions a caricaturist searches for. I try to capture the essence of the person, not just facial features ... I've discovered through years of working at capturing a humorous likeness that it's not about the features themselves as much as the space between the features. We all have two eyes, a nose, a mouth, hair, and jaw lines, but yet we all look different. What makes that so is the space between them.

The artist is actually creating his own storyboard for the film. I become the "camera" and look for angles, lighting, close-ups, wide angles, long shots—just as a director does to tell the story in the most visually interesting way he can. My first sketches are as much composition and design ideas as they are character and action images ... I don't want to get too involved in the juicy parts since some of what I'm doing will be modified or discarded as I get further involved in the storytelling. I then stand back and look at the page as a complete unit to make sure it's designed well: "Hmmm, three close-up panels in a row of characters talking. Better change that middle panel to a far shot. Maybe make that panel an open vignette." ... Then I place the facing pages together and look at how the spread holds together, and sometimes make changes based on that.

== Praise ==
When the magazine's parody of The Empire Strikes Back was published in 1980, drawn by Drucker, the magazine received a cease and desist letter from George Lucas' lawyers demanding that the issue be pulled from sale, and that Mad destroy the printing plates, surrender the original art, and turn over all profits from the issue. Unbeknownst to them, George Lucas had just sent Mad an effusive letter praising the parody, and declaring, "Special Oscars should be awarded to Drucker and DeBartolo, the George Bernard Shaw and Leonardo da Vinci of comic satire." Publisher Gaines mailed a copy of the letter to Lucas' lawyers with a handwritten message across the top: "That's funny, George liked it!" There was no further communication on the matter. Drucker had also worked on the advertising campaign for Lucas' earlier film American Graffiti. In his introduction to the Mad About Star Wars book, Lucas wrote, "I have always defended Mad from my lawyers."

In a 1985 Tonight Show appearance, when Johnny Carson asked Michael J. Fox, "When did you really know you'd made it in show business?" Fox replied, "When Mort Drucker drew my head."

Nick Meglin called Drucker "number one in a field of one." Charles Schulz wrote, "Frankly, I don't know how he does it, and I stand in a long list of admirers ... I think he draws everything the way we would all like to draw." In 2012, referring to Drucker's splash page for Mad's parody of The Godfather, the Comics Reporter's Tom Spurgeon wrote, "The way he draws James Caan's eyebrow is worth some folks' entire careers."

== Awards ==
Mort Drucker's Time covers are in the collection of the National Portrait Gallery. He was recognized for his work with the National Cartoonists Society Special Features Award (1985, 1986, 1987, 1988), its Reuben Award (1987), Eisner Award Hall of Fame (2010) and induction into the Society's Hall of Fame (2017). Drucker was awarded an Honorary Doctor of Fine Arts degree from The Art Institute of Boston. He was awarded the Inkpot Award in 1996.

== Death ==
Drucker died on April 9, 2020, in his Woodbury, New York home. His daughter Laurie reported to Associated Press that the previous week he had experienced respiratory problems and had trouble walking, but she did not state the actual cause of his death. Laurie added that her father had not been tested for the coronavirus.

== Bibliography ==
- MAD's Greatest Artists: Mort Drucker by Mort Drucker. Running Press, 2012. ISBN 978-0-7624-4713-8
- Tomatoes from Mars by Arthur Yorinks and Mort Drucker. Di Capua, 1999. ISBN 978-0-06-205070-0
- Whitefish Will Rides Again! by Arthur Yorinks and Mort Drucker. Di Capua, 1994. ISBN 978-0-06-205037-3
- Draw 50 Famous Caricatures by Mort Drucker and Lee J. Ames. Doubleday, 1990. ISBN 978-0-385-24629-3
- The Ronald Reagan Coloring Book by Mort Drucker and Paul Laikin. Andrews and McMeel, 1988. ISBN 978-0-8362-1826-8
- Familiar Faces: The Art of Mort Drucker by David Duncan and Mort Drucker. Stabur Press, 1988. ISBN 978-0-941613-03-3
- The Ollie North Coloring Book by Mort Drucker and Paul Laikin. Andrews McMeel, 1987. ISBN 978-0-8362-2099-5
- Benchley, Book 1 by Mort Drucker. Blackthorne, 1987. ISBN 978-0-932629-24-1
- Mort Drucker's MAD Show-Stoppers by Mort Drucker. EC, 1985. ISBN 978-99987-8607-3
- What to Name Your Jewish Baby by Bill Adler and Mort Drucker and Arnie Kogen. Dutton, 1969. ISBN 978-1-936404-64-3
- My Son, the Daughter by Mort Drucker. Kanrom, 1964. ASIN: B000J1M1WK
- Political Wind-Ups by Alexander Roman and Mort Drucker. Kanrom, 1962. ASIN: B000ZLP4MS
- JFK Coloring Book by Alexander Roman and Mort Drucker. Kanrom, 1962. ISBN 978-1-936404-48-3

=== Illustrations for books by others ===
- A Book of Jean's Own, Maria Schneider writing as Jean Teasdale. St. Martin's Griffin, 2010. ISBN 978-0-312-64268-6
- Christopher Lee's Treasury of Terror, edited by Russ Jones. Pyramid, 1966. ASIN: B000B8GC3A
