= Berlin v. E.C. Publications, Inc. =

United States copyright law case

- Court: United States Court of Appeals for the Second Circuit
- Full case name: Irving Berlin, et al v. E.C. Publications, Inc., et al
- Argued: January 10, 1964
- Decided: March 23, 1964
- Citation: 329 F.2d 541 (2d Cir. 1964).

Court membership
- Judges sitting: Joseph Edward Lumbard, Irving Kaufman, Thurgood Marshall

Case opinions
- Majority: Kaufman, joined by Lumbard, Marshall

Berlin v. E.C. Publications, Inc., 329 F.2d 541 (2d Cir. 1964), was an important United States copyright law case decided by the United States Court of Appeals for the Second Circuit in 1964 involving the right to parody a well-known song's lyrics.

Mad magazine had published a special edition in 1961 titled More Trash from Mad No. 4, which featured a songbook containing 57 parody lyrics to existing popular songs, such as Irving Berlin's "A Pretty Girl is Like a Melody" (Mad's version was the hypochondriac "Louella Schwartz Describes Her Malady"). In each case, readers were advised that the magazine's lyrics could be sung "to the tune of" the original compositions' titles. Following the magazine's publication, several music corporations sued E.C. Publications, Inc. (the publisher of Mad magazine) over 25 of the 57 parodies. The suit asked for one dollar per song for each issue of More Trash from Mad No. 4 that had been published, totaling $25 million in alleged damages. The cover of the special had borne the inadvertently prescient blurb, "For Solo or Group Participation (Followed by Arrest)."

Berlin was the named plaintiff, but the suit was brought not just by Irving Berlin Inc., but also by the music publishers Chappell, T.B. Harms, and Leo Feist. Several of Berlin's compositions were at the heart of the dispute, but the complaint also cited songs by Jerome Kern, Cole Porter, Richard Rodgers, Lorenz Hart, and Oscar Hammerstein II.

The trial court found for Mad publisher E.C., establishing a legal precedent (the so-called "Mad magazine exception") protecting parody (but not, at that time, satire). The court ruled in E.C.'s favor on all but two of the parodies—"There's No Business Like No Business" and "Always"—whose lyrics were considered to revolve around the key words "business" and "always," and thus hewed too closely to the originals. For those two songs, the court denied summary relief to both parties. The other 23 parodies, such as "Louella Schwartz...", "The First Time I Saw Maris" and "The Horse That I'm Betting," were judged sufficiently distinct to qualify under "fair use."

The plaintiffs appealed to the Second Circuit, which ruled in Mad's favor for all 25 songs, not just the 23 that had been cleared by the trial court. In his decision, Circuit Court Judge Irving Kaufman wrote:

While the plaintiffs have resolutely insisted that the defendants' use of the original songs as a vehicle for the parodies was wrongful, and have alleged, in general terms, that the claimed infringements "caused substantial and irreparable damage," they have not indicated with any degree of particularity the manner in which injury might have been inflicted. There is no allegation akin to "passing-off"; with considerable reason, the plaintiffs have not asserted that the music-buying public could have had any difficulty in differentiating between the works of plaintiffs and defendants. Neither is there a claim that defendants' parodies might satisfy or even partially fulfill the demand for plaintiffs' originals; quite soundly, it is not suggested that "Louella Schwartz Describes Her Malady" might be an acceptable substitute for a potential patron of "A Pretty Girl Is Like a Melody." ...We believe in any event that the parody lyrics involved in this appeal would be permissible under the most rigorous application of the "substantiality" requirement. The disparities in theme, content and style between the original lyrics and the alleged infringements could hardly be greater. In the vast majority of cases, the rhyme scheme of the parodies bears no relationship whatsoever to that of the originals. While brief phrases of the original lyrics were occasionally injected into the parodies, this practice would seem necessary if the defendants' efforts were to "recall or conjure up" the originals; the humorous effect achieved when a familiar line is interposed in a totally incongruous setting, traditionally a tool of parodists, scarcely amounts to a "substantial" taking, if that standard is not to be woodenly applied. Similarly, the fact that defendants' parodies were written in the same meter as plaintiffs' compositions would seem inevitable if the original was to be recognized, but such a justification is not even necessary; we doubt that even so eminent a composer as plaintiff Irving Berlin should be permitted to claim a property interest in iambic pentameter.

The music companies sought review by the U.S. Supreme Court, which declined to grant certiorari and so sustained the circuit court's ruling.

Following the ruling, Mad went on to publish many hundreds of song parodies over the decades, including paperback collections. In 2009, the magazine's most prolific rhyming parodist, Frank Jacobs, appeared in the sixth chapter of the PBS documentary Make 'em Laugh: The Funny Business of America singing "Blue Cross," his parody of Berlin's "Blue Skies" (and health insurance) that had appeared in the original 1961 collection.

== Parodies from Sing Along with MAD ==
Written by Irving Berlin:

- "You're Just in Love"—parodied as "That's the Way Payola Goes"
- "Easter Parade" -- "Beauty Parade"
- "There's No Business Like Show Business" -- "There's No Business Like No Business"
- "Blue Skies" -- "Blue Cross"
- "Always" -- "Always"
- "A Pretty Girl is Like a Melody" -- "Louella Schwartz Describes Her Malady"
- "The Girl That I Marry" "The Horse That I'm Betting"
- "Cheek to Cheek" -- "Sheik to Sheik"

Written by Jerome Kern:

- "Who"—parodied as "Luce"
- "The Last Time I Saw Paris" -- "The First Time I Saw Maris"
- "Smoke Gets in Your Eyes" -- "Castro Told Us Lies"

Written by Cole Porter:

- "I've Got You Under My Skin"—parodied as "I Swat You Hard on the Skin"
- "Begin the Beguine" -- "When They Bring In the Machine"
- "Anything Goes" -- "Anything Goes"
- "You're the Top" -- "You're the Top"
- "Let's Do It" -- "Let's Do It"
- "I Get a Kick Out of You" -- "I Get a Kick-Back From You"
- "It's All Right with Me" -- "To Get More Salary"

Written by Richard Rodgers, with Lorenz Hart or Oscar Hammerstein II:

- "Where Or When"—parodied as "Where Or When"
- "It Might As Well Be Spring" -- "I'm Glad That You Can't Sing"
- "A Cockeyed Optimist" --"A Nuclear Physicist"
- "There's a Small Hotel" -- "There's a Small Canal"
- "Oklahoma" -- "Albert Einstein"
- "My Funny Valentine" -- "My Padded Overtime"
- "Shall We Dance?" -- "Shall We Strike?"
- "Hello, Young Lovers" -- "Hello, Young Doctors"
- "I Whistle a Happy Tune" -- "I Tell 'Em They've Got a Bug"
- "My Heart Stood Still" -- "My Dreams Were Killed"
- "Manhattan" -- "I'll Have Nairobi"
- "Oh, What a Beautiful Morning" -- "Oh, What a Beautiful Beefsteak"

The plaintiffs held the publishing rights to 30 of the 57 songs that had been parodied by Mad. Other than the six parodies specifically cited in the two judges' rulings -- "The First Time I Saw Maris", "Louella Schwartz Describes Her Malady", "I Swat You Hard on the Skin", "Blue Cross", "Always", and "There's No Business Like Show Business"—it is unclear which 19 of the plaintiffs' remaining 24 songs were in dispute.

Frank Jacobs wrote 23 of the parodies, whose topics ranged from nuclear physics to automation to the Philadelphia Phillies. Larry Siegel wrote another 23, on subjects from overcrowded classrooms to the 1960 Nixon-Kennedy debate to books about Hitler. The remaining 11 song parodies were credited to "The Editors." All of Jacobs' contested parodies were later included in the 2015 book collection MAD's Greatest Writers: Frank Jacobs.

== See also ==
- Campbell v. Acuff-Rose Music, Inc.
- Mad magazine#Controversy and lawsuit
