= Frank Jacobs =

American writer (1929–2021)

- Born: Franklin Jacobs; May 30, 1929; Lincoln, Nebraska, U.S.
- Died: April 5, 2021 (aged 91); Tarzana, California, U.S.
- Occupation: Satirist
- Writing career
- Language: English
- Years active: 1957-2014
- Genres: Satire, music
- Notable work: Mad

Franklin Jacobs (May 30, 1929 – April 5, 2021) was an American author of satires, known primarily for his work in Mad, to which he contributed from 1957 to 2014. Jacobs wrote a wide variety of lampoons and spoof, but was best known as a versifier who contributed parodies of famous song lyrics and poems. In 2009, Jacobs described himself as "the least-known writer of hysterical light verse in the United States."

In 2021, musical parodist "Weird Al" Yankovic told the Washington Post, "I absolutely devoured every issue [of Mad], and Frank Jacobs was a big reason for that obsession. I can’t swear that Frank’s work was my first-ever exposure to the art form of parody, but it was definitely the first time I had seen the craft approached with that much skill, wit and attention to detail. Frank laid out the template for me — he irrevocably changed my DNA."

Jacobs appeared in the sixth chapter of PBS' comedy documentary, Make 'em Laugh: The Funny Business of America singing "Blue Cross", his own 1961 parody of Irving Berlin's "Blue Skies". That lyric was one of 25 that were the subject of Berlin v. E.C. Publications, Inc., a precedent-setting case that was appealed to the Supreme Court and helped to define the boundaries of parody in American law.

== Mad contributions ==
Bored by his work in a public relations firm, Jacobs found a copy of the magazine and thought "I can do this." When the firm folded Jacobs went to Mad.

Jacobs' first submission to the magazine, "Why I Left the Army and Became a Civilian," resulted in an immediate sale and a request for more material. It was one of five Jacobs pieces to appear in issue #33 (June 1957), marking a prodigious debut for the Mad contributor. His byline subsequently appeared in more than 300 issues of the magazine, second only to Dick DeBartolo among Mad writers who did not also illustrate their own work. Jacobs had more than 575 credits for the magazine, more than any other writer and second only to writer/artist Al Jaffee. At his peak, Jacobs was writing a fifth of the magazine's content. "My top year, I sold 60 pages... so you get an idea of the roll I was on," Jacobs told an interviewer. 165 separate issues of Mad include multiple articles written by Jacobs.

Jacobs established numerous recurring features in Mad, including fabricated obituaries for fictional characters from various genres, and the "Do-It-Yourself Newspaper Stories" which offer a series of fill-in-the-blank options.

== Books and writings ==
Jacobs wrote 13 paperback books under the Mad imprint, including Mad for Better or Verse, a collection of poetry parodies, as well as the biography The Mad World of William M. Gaines.

One of Jacobs' non-Mad-related projects was the 1965 Alvin Steadfast on Vernacular Island, a gentle spoof of post-Victorian boys' books. The titular hero is a ten-year-old boy, who joins an adult explorer on Vernacular Island, a place populated by bizarre and wonderful creatures such as the Standing Ovation, the Ill Omen, the Glowing Report and the Ugly Rumor. The two humans go in search of the Doubt, and as their adventure takes them into the jungle, even more fabulous creatures are encountered. The original Dial Press edition was illustrated by Edward Gorey, in a non-characteristic whimsical style unlike his usual gleefully dark drawings. Jacobs' writing is only lightly cynical, with more of an emphasis on wordplay, puns and gentle humor.

Jacobs contributed to other magazines, including Oui, Playboy, Town and Country, New York, Sports Illustrated, Saturday Review, Punch and Signature.

At the 2009 San Diego Comic-Con, Jacobs received the Bill Finger Award for Excellence in Comic Book Writing.

=== Mad bibliography ===
Jacobs' work appears in most of the Mad reprint compilations. Two Mad compendiums containing only reprinted work by Jacobs have been published: "MAD Zaps the Human Race" in 1984, and "Mad's Greatest Writers: Frank Jacobs - Five Decades of His Greatest Works" in 2015.

He wrote 13 paperback books of new material under the Mad brand name:

- Mad For Better Or Verse (Signet 1968 / Warner Books, 1975)
- Sing Along with Mad (Signet 1970 / Warner Books, 1977 )
- Mad About Sports (Warner Paperback Library, 1972)
- Mad's Talking Stamps (Warner Paperback Library, 1974)
- The Mad Turned-On Zoo (Warner Paperback Library, 1974), with co-writer Bob Clarke
- The Mad Jumble Book (Warner Paperback Library, 1975), with co-writer Max Brandel
- More Mad About Sports (Warner Books, 1977)
- Mad Around The World (Warner Books, 1979)
- Mad Goes Wild (Warner Books, 1981), with co-writer Bob Clarke
- Get Stuffed With Mad (Warner Books, 1981)
- The Mad Jock Book (Warner Books, 1983)
- Mad Goes To Pieces (Warner Books, 1984)
- Mad's Believe It Or Nuts! (Warner Books, 1986)

Jacobs also contributed scripts to Don Martin's original paperbacks. In 2000, he provided the commentary for "'Mad' Cover to Cover," a book of the magazine's cover images.

=== Non-Mad bibliography ===
- Canvas Confidential – A Backward Glance at the World of Art (The Dial Press, 1963), co-written with Sy Reit
- 30 Ways to Stop Smoking (Pocket Books, 1964), illustrated by Alfred Gescheidt
- The Highly Unlikely Celebrity Cookbook (New American Library, 1964)
- It Came From Madison Avenue (Kanrom Inc., New York, 1964), co-written with Nick Meglin
- Alvin Steadfast on Vernacular Island (The Dial Press, 1965)
- The Mad World of William M. Gaines (Lyle Stuart, Inc., 1972; paperback edition, Bantam Books, 1973)
- Pitiless Parodies (Dover Books on Literature & Drama, 1994)
- Casey at the Bat Baseball Cards: The Mudville Nine (Dover Publications, 1995)
- Batty Baseball Cards (Dover Publications, 1995)
- Fun With Hand Shadows (Dover Games & Puzzle Activity Books, 1996), co-written with Henry Bursill
- Looney Limericks (Dover Games & Puzzle Activity Books, 1999)
