= Craig Crossman =

Craig Crossman is a national newspaper columnist for McClatchy newspapers, specializing in computer-related articles. Throughout the years his articles have appeared in hundreds of newspapers including The Washington Post, The Boston Globe, The Orange County Register, The Hawaiian Advertiser, The San Jose Mercury News and The Press-Enterprise.

He created and hosts the programme Computer America, the longest running, nationally syndicated radio talk show about computers.
