= Computer America =

Talk radio/video program

The Computer America Show is a talk radio/video program about technology ranging from consumer-level to new developments. Airing every weekday for two hours, it features interviews, regular correspondents who specialize in various fields, and a review of developments in technology news.

== History ==
Craig Crossman began as a professional entertainer and singer. He later attained a Bachelor of Science in Computer Science from Florida Atlantic University. Additionally, Craig was a contributing editor for several tech magazines. His articles grew to a weekly column in the Miami Herald in the 1980s, one of the top ten newspapers in the US at the time. The column was picked up by Knight Ridder (acquired by McClatchy Tribute), and the column reached a national readership once syndicated.

In 1991, Craig approached a local radio station, WJNO, about starting a tech radio program that eventually became Computer America. After a few years, the American Forum Radio Network approached him about syndicating during weekends. The national show entertained live audiences from several venues in South Florida, including The Roof Garden club and Palm Beach Atlantic University.

The show changed networks several times as a result of various mergers and acquisitions, and in 2012 the decision was made to self-syndicate.

== Content and Distribution ==
=== Distribution ===
Historically, The Computer America Show has been more of a conventional talk radio program in which interviews and dialogue were conducted by phone and were audio-only. Switching to an internet distribution model has allowed the show to include a video component that has been used for on-air demonstrations and an overall more complete show experience. The audio is still broadcast live via terrestrial and internet radio networks, while the live video is hosted live on the show's website, and archived episodes are available through YouTube.

=== Interviews ===
The interviews typically run for the first hour of the program, with occasional half-hour interviews during the second hour.

== Founder ==
Craig Crossman is the founder of the show and is now retired. He still books the show. Prior to hosting Computer America, he worked as a professional singer in Las Vegas and later as a manager of one of the early Apple stores.

=== Host ===
Ben Crossman, Craig's son, is now the host of the show.

=== Support Staff ===
- Aaron Crossman, Craig's other son, helps with the development of content, the show's Web site, and the show in general, is Executive Producer and Webmaster.
