= Arnie Kogen =

American comedy writer and producer

Arnie Kogen is an American comedy writer and producer. He has written for TV, film, and is a longtime writer for Mad Magazine. Among his hundreds of Mad bylines, Kogen has written more than 100 film or television parodies.

Born in Brooklyn, New York City, New York, to Jewish parents, Kogen contributed to Mad soon after college at New York University. He wrote for many of the top stand-up comics of that time including Don Adams, Morty Gunty, and Jan Murray. He moved on to writing for Candid Camera, The Les Crane Show, The Jackie Gleason Show and The Tonight Show Starring Johnny Carson.

In 1965 he co-wrote the feature film Birds Do It, starring Soupy Sales.

He moved to California with his family in 1968. His many variety and sitcom credits include The Dean Martin Show, The Carol Burnett Show, The Mary Tyler Moore Show, The Rich Little Show, The Tim Conway Show, The Golden Globes (1972–1975), Donny and Marie, An Evening at the Improv, Newhart, Empty Nest, and MADtv.

Kogen has written comedy material for many entertainers including Steve and Eydie, Totie Fields, Flip Wilson, Jackie Vernon, Sammy Davis Jr., Debbie Reynolds, Connie Stevens and Shelley Berman.

Kogen has won 3 Emmy Awards (7 nominations) and one WGA Award (3 nominations).

His son Jay Kogen, also an Emmy-winning comedy writer, was an original writer for the animated television series The Simpsons. His late daughter, Jill Arons, worked at The Bingo Bugle.
