= Stan Hart =

American comedy writer

Stan Hart (September 12, 1928 – July 27, 2017) was an American comedy writer with many television credits.

His work also appeared for decades in Mad, where he said "We tickle 'em with the feather while hitting them over the head with a hammer." He was closely associated with another Mad writer, Larry Siegel; though the two wrote separately for the magazine, both contributed to the off-Broadway musical The Mad Show, and later to The Carol Burnett Show (for which they won multiple Emmy Awards).

Hart retired and volunteered his time as a writing consultant with a performing arts school in Westchester County called the Youth Theatre Interactions, Inc. Hart died on July 27, 2017.

== Filmography ==
- Eat and Run (1986) (Movie)
- The Wonderful World of Disney (1981) (TV)
- The Hal Linden Special (1979) (TV)
- Oh, Nurse! (1972) (TV)
- Move (1970) (as Stanley Hart)
- The Carol Burnett Show (1967) TV Series (writer) (as Stanley Hart)
- Wonder Woman: Who's Afraid of Diana Prince? (1967) (TV)
