= Desmond Devlin =

American comedy writer

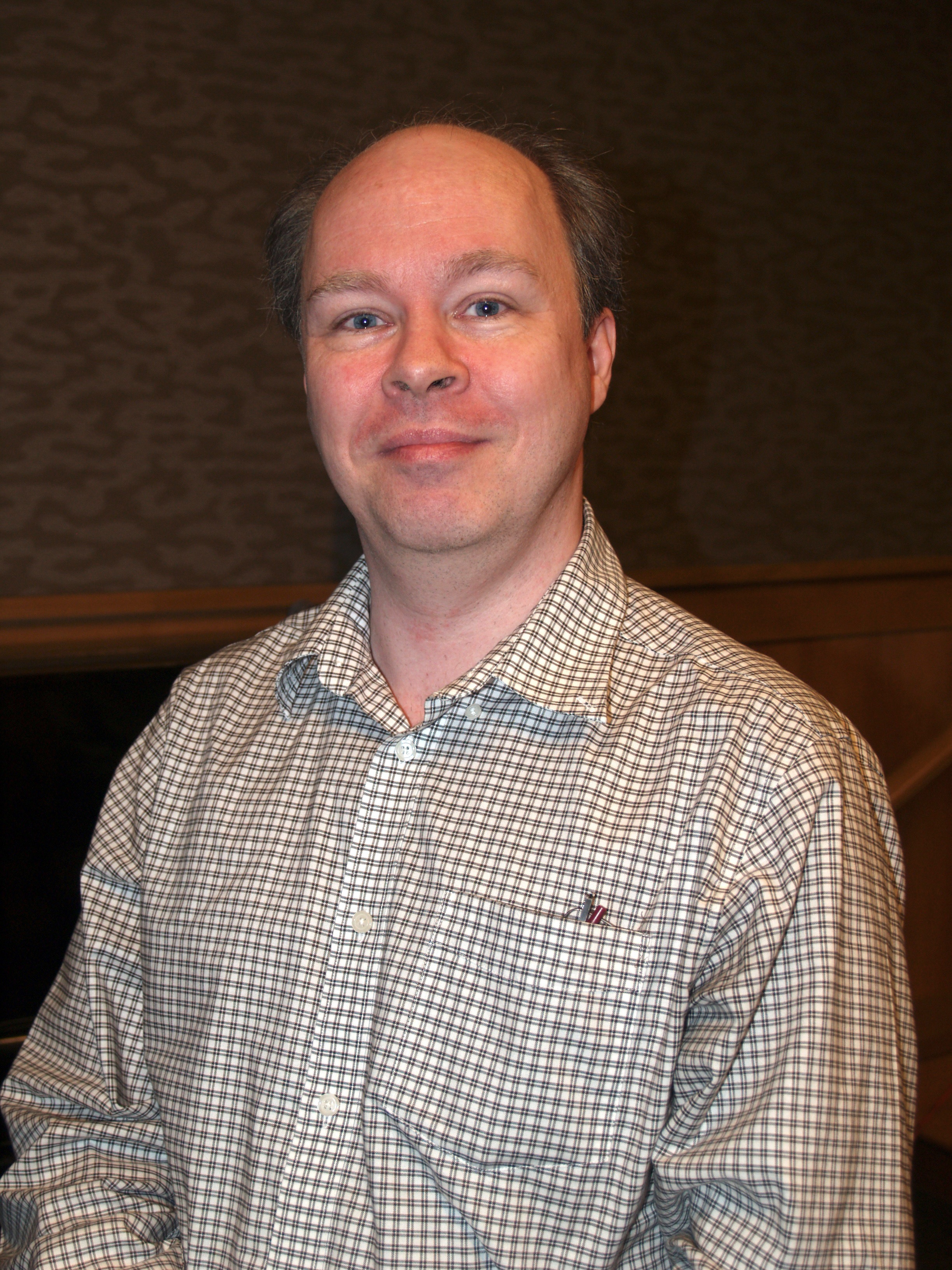
- Devlin at a November 18, 2013, signing for Inside Mad at a Barnes & Noble in Manhattan
- Occupations: Comedy writer, satirist
- Writing career
- Notable work: Mad
- Notable awards: 2001 Harvey Awards nomination

Desmond Devlin is an American comedy writer. His work has appeared in Mad since 1984, and with more than 450 bylined articles, he ranks as one of the magazine's three most frequent non-illustrating writers.

Devlin's recurring features have included "Melvin and Jenkins' Guide to ____," "Badly-Needed Warning Labels for Rock Albums," "Chilling Thoughts," "Stuff My Friend Moish Says," "Pop-Off Videos," "Mad Deconstructs Talk Shows" and "Graphic Novel Review." He has also written over fifty TV and movie parodies for the magazine, including all eight of the Harry Potter films and all six installments of the Lord of the Rings/Hobbit film series.

He was nominated for a 2001 Harvey Award for Best Writer for his work at Mad. He was also nominated for a CableACE award in 1994 for the game show Rumor Has It.

In September 2020, with Mad having been reduced to a primarily reprint format, Devlin and Mad artist Tom Richmond announced that they were crowdfunding a book of newly created movie parodies called Claptrap. They launched their Indiegogo campaign with the completed two-page opening spread for Star Worse: Plagiarizing Skywalker, a spoof of the ninth film in the Star Wars saga. The book will also include takeoffs of older popular or iconic films that Mad had for various reasons opted not to parody at the time of their releases. The other eleven films are The Big Lebowski, Blade Runner, The Blues Brothers, Citizen Kane, Die Hard, Goodfellas, The Princess Bride, Psycho, The Shawshank Redemption, Toy Story 4 and Unforgiven.

Claptrap was published in 2023.
