= Tom Richmond (illustrator) =

American cartoonist

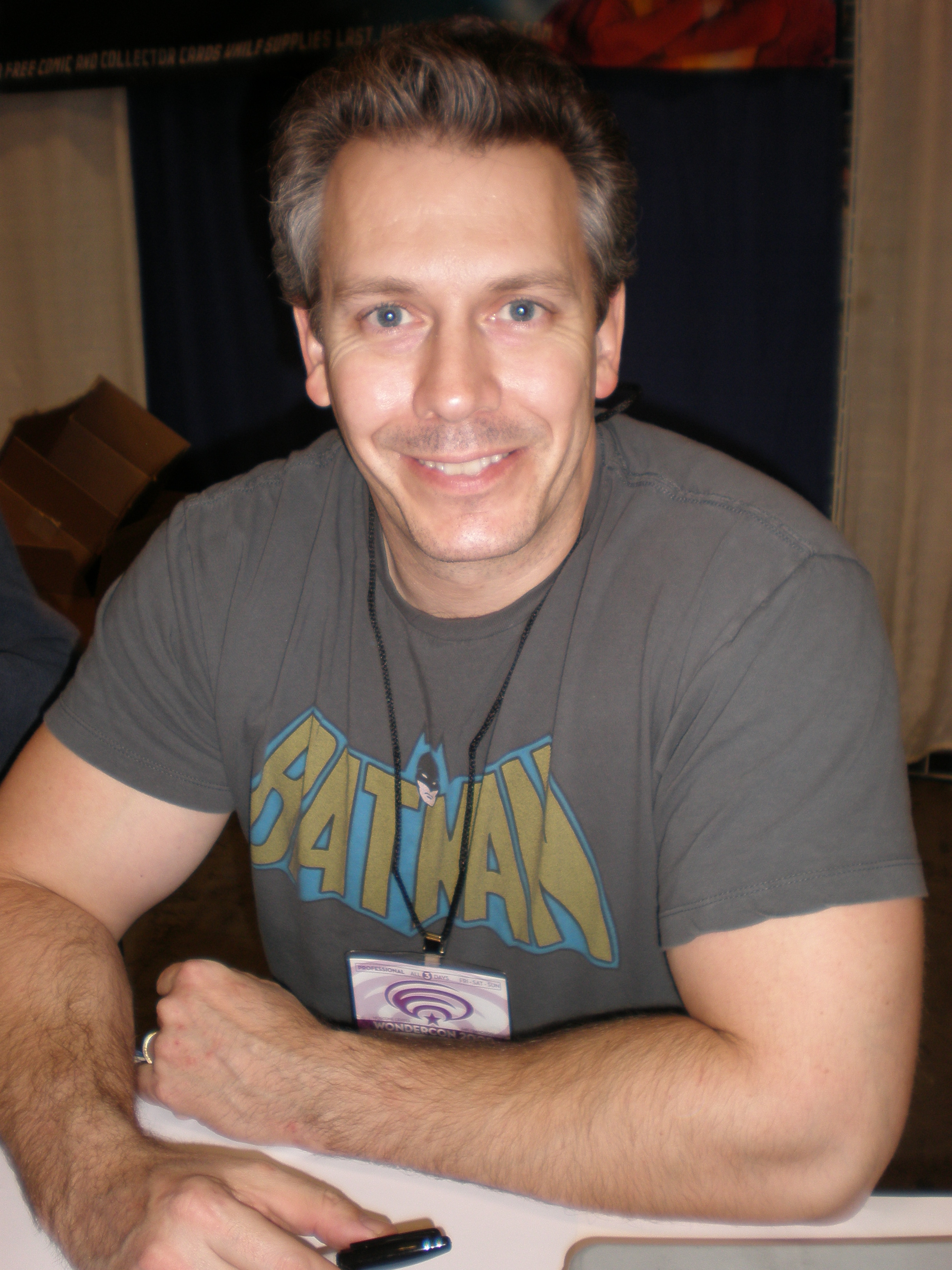
Richmond at WonderCon 2009

Tom Richmond (born May 4, 1966) is an American freelance humorous illustrator, cartoonist and caricaturist whose work has appeared in many national and international publications since 1990. He was chosen as the 2011 "Outstanding Cartoonist of the Year", also known as "The Reuben Award", winner by the National Cartoonists Society.

== Career ==
Some of Richmond's earliest publication work was for the comic book Married... with Children for NOW Comics, and the mini-series The Coneheads for Marvel Comics in the early 1990s. Specializing in caricature, he began doing editorial illustrations for magazines, art for advertising and CD-ROM graphics in 1992. In the late 1990s he had a brief stint at Cracked magazine before beginning to work for Mad magazine in 2000. Richmond became a major contributor to Mad, his caricatures and cartoons illustrating many of Mad's trademark movie and TV parodies. He was the first illustrator in Mad's modern (non-comic book) era to do his TV and film parodies in full color, coinciding with Mad's switch to a color format in 2001. Richmond continues to do freelance illustration for a variety of publications and advertising clients.

Richmond's work has also been seen in film and on television. He has a credit in the 2008 film Super Capers as an illustrator, having contributed caricature illustrations for opening credit and flashback animations for the movie. In 2010 he contributed animation character design for CGI animated segments in the film I Want Your Money, as well as doing the one-sheet poster art. Also in 2010, he began contributing artwork and character design for the Cartoon Network animated show Mad, based on the magazine. In 2019 Richmond created 1960s era Mad and TV Guide cover illustrations for the Quentin Tarantino film Once Upon a Time in Hollywood featuring Leonardo DiCaprio's character Rick Dalton in his fictional TV role from the film. Both illustrations appeared onscreen, and the Mad cover eventually became an actual cover of Mad magazine (#9, Oct 2019) which included a parody of the Bounty Law TV show from the movie.

Richmond has been honored with several awards, including the Golden Nosey for "Caricaturist of the Year" twice, in 1998 and 1999 by the National Caricaturist Network and with a divisional "Silver" Reuben award for Advertising Art in 2003, 2006 and 2007, Newspaper Illustration in 2009, Magazine Illustration in 2015 and 2019, and Book Illustration in 2024, from the National Cartoonists Society. In 2011, Richmond became the 34th president of the Society, succeeding Jeff Keane, and served two terms though 2015. NCS presidents are chosen for two-year terms.

Richmond designed the look of Achmed Junior, one of the puppets used by ventriloquist Jeff Dunham, which made his debut in Dunham's 2010 Identity Crisis tour, and made his first onscreen appearance in Dunham's 2011 Comedy Central special, Jeff Dunham: Controlled Chaos.

In 2011, Deadline Demon Publishing published Richmond's book on the art of drawing caricatures, The Mad Art of Caricature! A Serious Guide to Drawing Funny Faces.

On August 27, 2006, he appeared in the comic strip Pearls Before Swine. Richmond returned the favor by caricaturing the strip's creator Stephan Pastis inside a garbage can, in a 2006 issue of Mad.

On December 30, 2012, he appeared in Mort Walker's comic strip Beetle Bailey.

In September 2020, with Mad having been reduced to a primarily reprint format, Richmond and longtime Mad writer Desmond Devlin announced that they were crowdfunding a book of newly created movie parodies called Claptrap. They launched the campaign with the completed two-page opening spread for Star Worse: Plagiarizing Skywalker, a spoof of the ninth film in the Star Wars saga. The book will also include spoofs of older popular or iconic films that Mad had for various reasons opted not to parody at the time of their releases. The other eleven films are The Big Lebowski, Blade Runner, The Blues Brothers, Citizen Kane, Die Hard, Goodfellas, The Princess Bride, Psycho, The Shawshank Redemption, Toy Story 4, and Unforgiven.

Claptrap was published in 2023.
