= Larry Siegel =

American dramatist

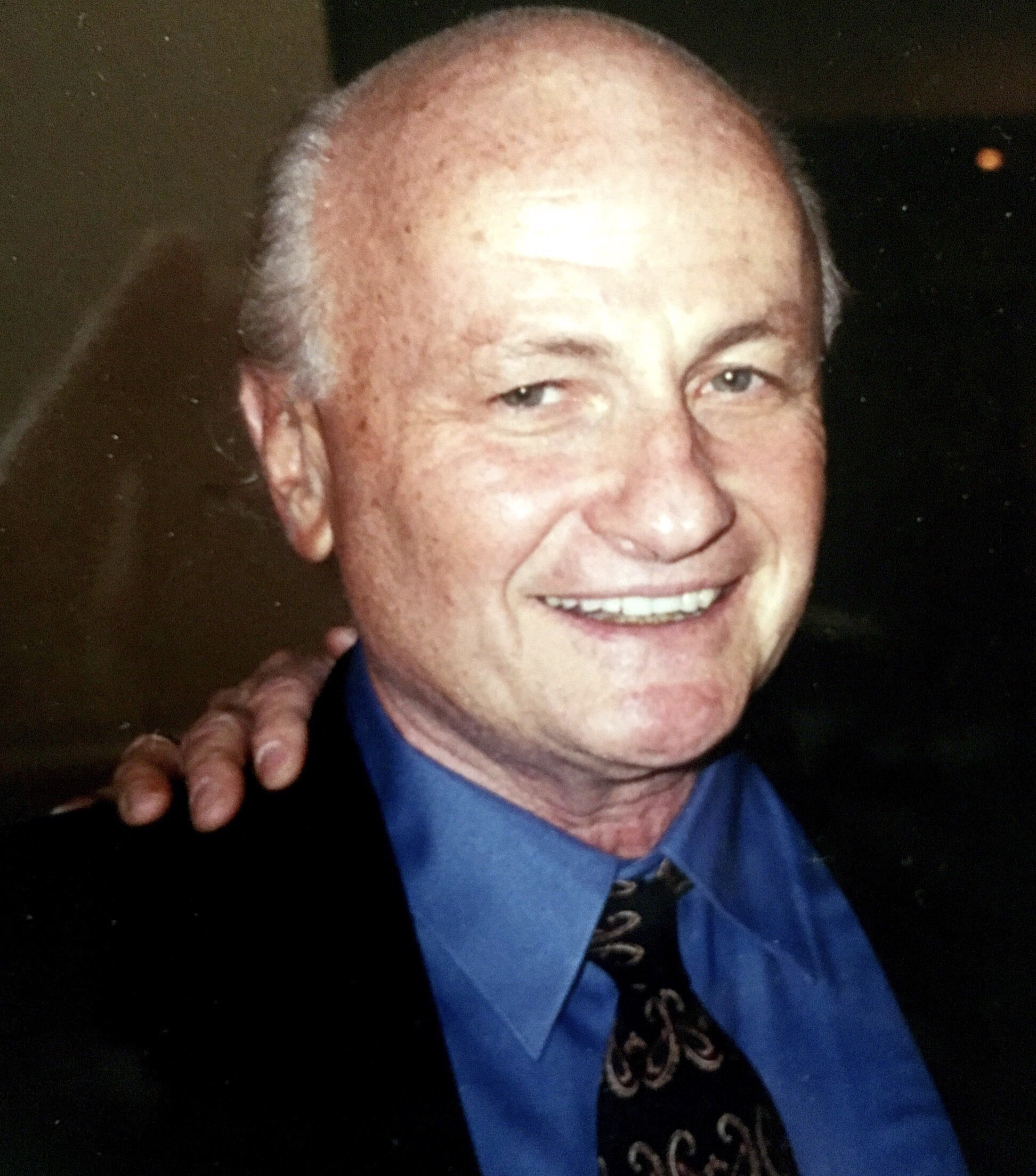
Larry Siegel

Lawrence H. Siegel (October 29, 1925 – August 20, 2019) was an American comedy writer and satirist who wrote for television, stage, magazines, records, and books. He won three Emmys as Head Writer during four seasons of The Carol Burnett Show along with one Writers Guild award and a dozen Emmy and Writers Guild nominations for his work in television comedy on shows like Burnett and Laugh-In. He was one of Mad Magazine's top movie satire writers, and a member of the "usual gang of idiots" for almost 33 years as well as one of the earliest humor and satire writers for Playboy. He was also a WWII Veteran, and the only American comedy writer to have ever both won an Emmy and received a Purple Heart.

== Early life ==
Siegel was born in New York City on October 29, 1925, to a family of Jewish descent. His first published work was a poem, Oh Dear What Can Sinatra Be?, which tweaked both the singer and his bobbysoxer fans, and ran in Earl Wilson's syndicated newspaper column in 1943. The verse read in part:

A quivering lip
Blaring lovesick rhyme,
Her insides flip in double time.

A slender frame with sagging knees
Yet garnering fame with uncanny ease
The stricken dame pants the breeze.

Eyes of blue, two hands alike
Stretching forth true
Lovingly to strike
Close to you? No, his mike.

At the age of 18, Siegel was drafted into the Army soon after his contribution to Wilson's column. In early 1944, after concluding infantry basic training in Georgia, he volunteered for additional stateside training with the 10th Mountain Division. The 10th landed in Naples, Italy for battle in January 1945. Siegel became an Army Rifleman and decorated war hero who received a Purple Heart, Bronze Star Medal, American Theater Ribbon, EAME Theater Ribbon with two Bronze Stars, Victory Medal, Combat Infantry Badge, and a Good Conduct ribbon.

After the war ended, Siegel enrolled at the University of Illinois on the G.I. Bill. He wrote for the school humor magazine, Shaft, for two years. He became editor of the publication when his predecessor, Hugh Hefner, graduated, a college connection that would influence his future comedy career. While at college, Siegel had stories published in Fantasy and Science Fiction and American Legion Magazine. Siegel graduated and returned to his family in New York in 1950.

In 1955, while on vacation in Nantucket, Siegel fell in love with Helen Hartman, an aide in the office of United Nations Secretary-General Dag Hammarskjöld in New York. He proposed on their first date and they were married until Siegel's death.

== Career ==
=== New York ===
In the late 1950s, Hugh Hefner would enter his life once again when Siegel found work as Eastern Promotion Manager for Chicago-based Playboy. Siegel started writing humorous articles and satirical pieces for Playboy, Humbug and Mad Magazine. He wrote nearly 300 articles for the latter, which appeared in more than 150 issues. Siegel's output for Mad included nearly 80 movie and television parodies, including "The Oddfather," "Balmy and Clod" and "Flawrence of Arabia" as well as a dozen "primers," and several imaginary magazine parodies on topics ranging from medicine, to 1960s protesters, to "gun nuts." Siegel also wrote song parodies, including several of those in the Mad special issue which ultimately provoked a failed lawsuit by Irving Berlin and other composers which established certain copyright law protections that endure to this day.

In 1965, at the behest of composer Mary Rodgers and Mad publisher William Gaines, Siegel collaborated with Stan Hart on The Mad Show.

=== California ===
The world-wide success of The Mad Show brought the Siegel and Hart families to Los Angeles in 1968. There, they wrote a Flip Wilson special for NBC and a pilot for 20th Century Fox producer David Gerber called Oh Nurse!

In 1970, Siegel was hired by producer George Schlatter to write for Laugh-In. He later broke contract to write for Carol Burnett with Stan Hart. The team spent three years with Burnett, during which they won two Emmys and were nominated for another. Siegel and Hart parted from the Burnett show in 1974, and Siegel helped launch That's My Mama on ABC. He returned for the final season of Carol Burnett's show in 1977 and won a third Emmy.

In the early 1980s, Siegel was hired as part of a team of writers to pen a sequel of sorts to the hit LP record The First Family. Titled The First Family Rides Again and highlighting mimic Rich Little, the follow-up dealt with the life of Ronald Reagan.

During the 1990s, Siegel spent three years teaching comedy writing at UCLA before turning to acting and joining the Screen Actors Guild. He did commercials for companies including IBM and Northwest Airlines and also performed in stage musicals in the Los Angeles area. At the age of 87, Siegel was still doing improvisational comedy, writing, and performing in sketches for shows at the Broad Theater in Santa Monica, California. He died on August 20, 2019, at the age of 93.
