= List of television show spoofs in Mad =

A typical issue of Mad magazine will include at least one full parody of a popular movie or television show. The titles are changed to create a play on words; for instance, The Addams Family became The Adnauseum Family. The character names are generally switched in the same fashion.

These articles typically cover five pages or more and are presented as a sequential storyline with caricatures and word balloons. The opening page or two-page splash usually consists of the cast of the show introducing themselves directly to the reader; in some parodies, the writers sometimes attempt to circumvent this convention by presenting the characters without such direct exposition. Many parodies end with the abrupt deus ex machina appearance of outside characters or pop culture figures who are similar in nature to the movie or TV series being parodied, or who comment satirically on the theme. For example, Dr. Phil arrives to counsel the Desperate Housewives, or the cast of Sex and the City show up as the new goomahs on The Sopranos.

The parodies frequently make comedic use of the fourth wall, breaking character, and meta-references. Within an ostensibly self-contained storyline, the characters may refer to the technical aspects of filmmaking, the publicity, hype, or box office surrounding their project, their own past roles, any clichés being used, and so on.

Several show business stars have been quoted to the effect that the moment when they knew they'd finally "made it" was when they saw themselves thus depicted in the pages of Mad. The following list of all the TV show spoofs in Mad Magazine is ordered by the decades in which they were produced.

== TV shows spoofs list ==
=== 1950s ===
Spoofed title	Actual title	Writer	Artist	Issue	Date	Ref
Lone Stranger!	The Lone Ranger (September 1949 – June 1957) (Genre: Western drama) (Broadcaster: ABC)	Harvey Kurtzman	Jack Davis	3	January–February 1953	
Lone Stranger Rides Again!	The Lone Ranger (September 1949 – June 1957) (Genre: Western drama) (Broadcaster: ABC)	Harvey Kurtzman	Jack Davis	8	December 1953 - January 1954	
Dragged Net!	Dragnet (December 1951 – August 1959) (a spoof of the radio version had previously appeared in issue #3) (Genre: Police procedural) (Broadcaster: NBC)	Harvey Kurtzman	Will Elder	11	May 1954	
The Countynental!	The Continental (January 1952 – January 1953) (Genre: Romantic rendezvous) (Broadcaster: CBS & ABC)	Harvey Kurtzman	Jack Davis	14	August 1954	
Captain TVideo!	Captain Video and His Video Rangers (June 1949 – April 1955) (Genre: Science fiction) (Broadcaster: DuMont)	Harvey Kurtzman	Jack Davis	15	September 1954	
What's My Shine!	Both What's My Line? (February 1950 – September 1967) (Genre: Panel game show) (Broadcaster: CBS) and the televised Army–McCarthy hearings	Harvey Kurtzman	Jack Davis	17	November 1954	
Howdy Dooit!	Howdy Doody (January 1948 – September 1960) (Genre: Puppetry) (Broadcaster: NBC)	Harvey Kurtzman	Will Elder	18	December 1954	
Is This Your Life?	This Is Your Life (October 1952 – June 1961) (Genre: Reality documentary) (Broadcaster: NBC)	Harvey Kurtzman	Will Elder	24	July 1955	
The Dave Garrowunway Show	Today with Dave Garroway (Since January 1952 (though Garroway left the show in 1961)) (Genre: Talk show) (Broadcaster: NBC)	Harvey Kurtzman	Jack Davis	26	November 1955	
Nightwatch	Dragnet (June 1949 – July 1957) (Genre: Police radio) (Broadcaster: NBC)	Arnold Hayne	Will Elder	27	April 1956	
The Ed Suvillan Show	The Ed Sullivan Show (June 1948 – June 1971) (Genre: Sketch comedy) (Broadcaster: CBS)	Harvey Kurtzman	Will Elder	27	April 1956	
Medical	Medic (September 1954 – August 1956) (Genre: Medical drama) (Broadcaster: NBC)	Harvey Kurtzman	Will Elder	28	July 1956	
Walt Dizzy Presents Dizzyland	Walt Disney Presents Disneyland (October 1954 – September 1983) (Genre: Musical drama) (Broadcaster: ABC)	?	Wally Wood	30	December 1956	
Gunsmoked	Gunsmoke (September 1955 – March 1975) (Genre: Western) (Broadcaster: CBS)	Harvey Kurtzman	Jack Davis	30	December 1956	
Big Big Story	The Big Story (September 1949 – 1958) (Genre: Anthology) (Broadcaster: NBC & Syndication)	?	Don Martin	32	April 1957	
The Night that Perry Masonmint Lost a Case	Perry Mason (September 1957 – May 1966) (Genre: Legal drama) (Broadcaster: CBS)	Dee Caruso	Bill Levine; Mort Drucker	48	July 1959	
The Night Peter Gone Cracked	Peter Gunn (September 1958 – September 1961) (Genre: Action/Crime drama) (Broadcaster: NBC & ABC)	Larry Siegel	Bob Clarke	50	October 1959	
The Price is All Right	The Price Is Right (November 1956 – September 1965) (Genre: Game show) (Broadcaster: NBC & ABC)	Larry Siegel	Mort Drucker	51	December 1959	

=== 1960s ===
Spoofed title	Actual title	Writer	Artist	Issue	Date	Ref
777 Sunset Strip	77 Sunset Strip (October 1958 – February 1964) (Genre: Crime drama) (Broadcaster: ABC)	Larry Siegel	Mort Drucker	52	January 1960	
The Rifle, Man!	The Rifleman (September 1958 – April 1963) (Genre: Western) (Broadcaster: ABC)	Nick Meglin	Mort Drucker	53	March 1960	
The Arthur Money Party	The Arthur Murray Party (June 1950 – September 1960) (Genre: Variety show) (Broadcaster: ABC)	Larry Siegel	Mort Drucker	55	June 1960	
Highway Squad	Highway Patrol (October 1955 – September 1959) (Genre: Crime drama) (Broadcaster: Broadcast syndication)	Larry Siegel	Mort Drucker	58	October 1960	
TV's Wonder Dog Lizzie	Lassie (September 1954 – March 1973) (Genre: Adventure) (Broadcaster: CBS)	Larry Siegel	Mort Drucker	59	December 1960	
Naked Town	Naked City (September 1958 – May 1963) (Genre: Crime drama) (Broadcaster: ABC)	Larry Siegel	Mort Drucker	60	January 1961	
Sneaky Camera with Allan Funn	Candid Camera with Allen Funt (August 1948 – Ongoing) (Genre: Reality) (Broadcaster: ABC, CBS, NBC)	Larry Siegel	Jack Rickard	64	July 1961	
Route 67	Route 66 (October 1960 – March 1964) (Genre: Detective duo) (Broadcaster: CBS)	Larry Siegel	Mort Drucker	70	April 1962	
Bananaz	Bonanza (September 1959 – January 1973) (Genre: Western) (Broadcaster: NBC)	Lou Silverstone	Mort Drucker	73	September 1962	
Dr. Kiljoy	Dr. Kildare (September 1961 – April 1966) (Genre: Medical drama) (Broadcaster: NBC)	Lou Silverstone	Mort Drucker	74	October 1962	
The Defensers	The Defenders (September 1961 – May 1965) (Genre: Courtroom drama) (Broadcaster: CBS)	Lou Silverstone	Mort Drucker	77	March 1963	
The Tenth Hour	The Eleventh Hour (October 1962 – April 1964) (Genre: Medical drama) (Broadcaster: NBC)	Lou Silverstone	Mort Drucker	80	July 1963	
The Nurtzes	The Nurses (September 1962 – May 1965) (Genre: Medical drama) (Broadcaster: CBS)	Stan Hart	Mort Drucker	82	October 1963	
Strange Interlude with Hazey	Hazel (September 1961 – April 1966) (Genre: Sitcom) (Broadcasters: NBC, then CBS), with reference to Eugene O'Neill's play Strange Interlude	Stan Hart	Mort Drucker	85	March 1964	
Buck's Law	Burke's Law (September 1963 – January 1966) (Genre: Crime drama) (Broadcaster: ABC)	Frank Jacobs; Stan Hart; Larry Siegel	Mort Drucker	88	July 1964	
The Phewgitive	The Fugitive (September 1963 – August 1967) (Genre: Crime drama) (Broadcaster: ABC)	Stan Hart	Mort Drucker	89	September 1964	
Mr. Nudnik	Mr. Novak (September 1963 – August 1965) (Genre: Drama) (Broadcaster: NBC)	Arnie Kogen	Mort Drucker	91	December 1964	
Passion Place	Peyton Place (September 1964 – June 1969) (Genre: Soap opera) (Broadcaster: ABC)	Stan Hart	Mort Drucker	95	June 1965	
The Man From A.U.N.T.I.E.	The Man from U.N.C.L.E. (September 1964 – January 1968) (Genre: Science fiction) (Broadcaster: NBC)	Arnie Kogen	Mort Drucker	96	July 1965	
The Rooks	The Rogues (September 1964 – April 1965) (Genre: Drama) (Broadcaster: NBC)	Stan Hart	Mort Drucker	97	September 1965	
Flapper	Flipper (September 1964 – April 1967) (Genre: Adventure) (Broadcaster: NBC)	Dick DeBartolo	Mort Drucker	98	October 1965	
Football "In Depth"	Parody of the TV reporting overkill used at the 1964 political conventions, applied to a football telecast	Ronald Axe; Sol Weinstein	George Woodbridge	99	December 1965	
The Virginiaham	The Virginian (September 1962 – March 1971) (Genre: Western) (Broadcaster: NBC)	Lou Silverstone	Mort Drucker	99	December 1965	
The Nilson Family	The Adventures of Ozzie and Harriet (October 1952 – September 1966) (Genre: Sitcom) (Broadcaster: ABC)	Stan Hart	Mort Drucker	100	January 1966	
Shirley Finster's New York	Parody of specials showing movie stars conducting "TV tours" of big cities	Ronald Axe; Sol Weinstein	George Woodbridge	100	January 1966	
Voyage to See What's on the Bottom	Voyage to the Bottom of the Sea (September 1964 – March 1968) (Genre: Science fiction) (Broadcaster: ABC)	Dick DeBartolo	Mort Drucker	101	March 1966	
BrandXed	Branded (January 1965 – September 1966) (Genre: Western) (Broadcaster: NBC)	Lou Silverstone	Mort Drucker	102	April 1966	
Wild World of Sports	Wide World of Sports (April 1961 – January 1998) (Genre: Sports) (Broadcaster: ABC)	Al Jaffee	George Woodbridge	102	April 1966	
Honey Waste	Honey West (September 1965 – April 1966) (Genre: Crime drama) (Broadcaster: ABC)	Tom Koch	Mort Drucker	103	June 1966	
Loused Up in Space	Lost in Space (September 1965 – March 1968) (Genre: Science fiction) (Broadcaster: CBS)	Dick DeBartolo	Mort Drucker	104	July 1966	
Bats-man	Batman (January 1966 – March 1968) (Genre: Superhero) (Broadcaster: ABC)	Lou Silverstone	Mort Drucker	105	September 1966	
Hullabadig Au Go Go	Hullabaloo (January 1965 – August 1966) (Genre: Musical variety) (Broadcaster: NBC) / Shindig! (September 1964 – January 1966) (Genre: Musical variety) (Broadcaster: ABC) / Hollywood a Go Go (January 1965 – February 1966) (Genre: Musical variety) (Broadcaster: Broadcast syndication)	Dick DeBartolo	Jack Davis	105	September 1966	
12 O'Crocked High	12 O'Clock High (September 1964 – January 1967) (Genre: Military drama) (Broadcaster: ABC)	Dick DeBartolo	Mort Drucker	106	October 1966	
The Miss American Beauty Pageant	The Miss America Beauty Pageant (Held since 1921, the event was first broadcast on TV in 1954) (Genre: Pageant) (Broadcaster: Broadcast syndication)	Dick DeBartolo	Mort Drucker	107	December 1966	
Hokum's Heroes / Hochman's Heroes	Hogan's Heroes (September 1965 – March 1971) (Genre: Military sitcom) (Broadcaster: CBS)	Larry Siegel	Jack Davis	108	January 1967	
Doc Tari	Daktari (January 1966 – January 1969) (Genre: Adventure) (Broadcaster: CBS)	Dick DeBartolo	Jack Davis	109	March 1967	
The Life of Your Run	Run for Your Life (September 1965 – March 1968) (Genre: Drama) (Broadcaster: NBC)	Dick DeBartolo	Mort Drucker	110	April 1967	
Why Spy?	I Spy (September 1965 – April 1968) (Genre: Comedy-drama) (Broadcaster: NBC)	Stan Hart	Mort Drucker	111	June 1967	
TVarzan	Tarzan (September 1966 – April 1968) (Genre: Fantasy drama) (Broadcaster: NBC)	Dick DeBartolo	Mort Drucker	112	July 1967	
The Iron Horselaff	Iron Horse (September 1966 – January 1968) (Genre: Western) (Broadcaster: ABC)	Dick DeBartolo	Mort Drucker	113	September 1967	
Ratpacktrol	The Rat Patrol (September 1966 – March 1968) (Genre: Military drama) (Broadcaster: ABC)	Lou Silverstone	Mort Drucker	114	October 1967	
Star Blecch	Star Trek (September 1966 – June 1969) (Genre: Science fiction) (Broadcaster: NBC)	Dick DeBartolo	Mort Drucker	115	December 1967	
The Joe Nasty Show	Parody of the trend towards rude or confrontational talk shows, primarily Joe Pyne's	Larry Siegel	Jack Davis	116	January 1968	
Mission: Ridiculous	Mission: Impossible (September 1966 – March 1973) (Genre: Action) (Broadcaster: CBS)	Dick DeBartolo	Mort Drucker	118	April 1968	
The Invasioners	The Invaders (January 1967 – March 1968) (Genre: Science fiction) (Broadcaster: ABC)	Lou Silverstone	Jack Davis	119	June 1968	
The Flying Nut	The Flying Nun (September 1967 – March 1970) (Genre: Fantasy sitcom) (Broadcaster: ABC)	Larry Siegel	Mort Drucker	121	September 1968	
Genteel Ben	Gentle Ben (September 1967 – August 1969) (Genre: Drama) (Broadcaster: CBS)	Dick DeBartolo	Don Martin	122	October 1968	
It Takes a Crook	It Takes a Thief (January 1968 – March 1970) (Genre: Drama) (Broadcaster: ABC)	Lou Silverstone	Mort Drucker	123	December 1968	
Jugg for the Defensive	Judd, for the Defense (September 1967 – March 1969) (Genre: Legal drama) (Broadcaster: ABC)	Lou Silverstone	Mort Drucker	123	December 1968	
Mannecch	Mannix (September 1967 – April 1975) (Genre: Crime drama) (Broadcaster: CBS)	Lou Silverstone	Mort Drucker	123	December 1968	
Familiar Affair	Family Affair (September 1966 – March 1971) (Genre: Sitcom) (Broadcaster: CBS)	Stan Hart	Mort Drucker	126	April 1969	
The Odd Squad	The Mod Squad (September 1968 – August 1973) (Genre: Undercover cop) (Broadcaster: ABC)	Dick DeBartolo	Mort Drucker	127	June 1969	
Jewelia	Julia (September 1968 – March 1971) (Genre: Sitcom) (Broadcaster: NBC)	Stan Hart	Mort Drucker	129	September 1969	
Land of the Giant Bores	Land of the Giants (September 1968 – March 1970) (Genre: Science fiction) (Broadcaster: ABC)	Dick DeBartolo	Mort Drucker	130	October 1969	
Boredom-12	Adam-12 (September 1968 – May 1975) (Genre: Police drama) (Broadcaster: NBC)	Dick DeBartolo	Mort Drucker	131	December 1969	

=== 1970s ===
Spoofed title	Actual title	Writer	Artist	Issue	Date	Ref
"The Ghost and the Mrs." Misses	The Ghost & Mrs. Muir (September 1968 – March 1970) (Genre: Sitcom) (Broadcaster: NBC & ABC)	Dick DeBartolo	Mort Drucker	134	April 1970	
Then Came Bombsome	Then Came Bronson (September 1969 – April 1970) (Genre: Adventure) (Broadcaster: NBC)	Dick DeBartolo	Angelo Torres	135	June 1970	
Room 222ZZZZZZzzzzzzzzz	Room 222 (September 1969 – January 1974) (Genre: Comedy-drama) (Broadcaster: ABC)	Stan Hart	Angelo Torres	136	July 1970	
Makeus Sickby M.D.	Marcus Welby, M.D. (September 1969 – July 1976) (Genre: Medical drama) (Broadcaster: ABC)	Dick DeBartolo	Angelo Torres	137	September 1970	
Ironride	Ironside (September 1967 – January 1975) (Genre: Crime drama) (Broadcaster: NBC)	Lou Silverstone	Angelo Torres	139	December 1970	
The Doris Daze Show	The Doris Day Show (September 1968 – March 1973) (Genre: Sitcom) (Broadcaster: CBS)	Stan Hart	Angelo Torres	140	January 1971	
How-Are-Ya-Five-O?	Hawaii Five-O (September 1968 – April 1980) (Genre: Police drama) (Broadcaster: CBS)	Dick DeBartolo	Angelo Torres	141	March 1971	
My Three Sonny Boys	My Three Sons (September 1960 – August 1972) (Genre: Sitcom) (Broadcaster: ABC & CBS)	Arnie Kogen	Angelo Torres	142	April 1971	
The Game is Inane	The Name of the Game (September 1968 – March 1971) (Genre: Mystery drama) (Broadcaster: NBC)	Lou Silverstone	Angelo Torres	143	June 1971	
The F.I.B.	The F.B.I. (September 1965 – April 1974) (Genre: Police drama) (Broadcaster: ABC)	Dick DeBartolo	Angelo Torres	144	July 1971	
Mad's Reality Street	Sesame Street (Since November 1969) (Genre: Puppetry) (Broadcaster: PBS)	Dick DeBartolo	Jack Davis	146	October 1971	
Gall in the Family Fare	All in the Family (January 1971 – April 1979) (Genre: Sitcom) (Broadcaster: CBS)	Larry Siegel	Angelo Torres	147	December 1971	
Storefront Broadcasters	Storefront Lawyers (September 1970 – January 1971) (Genre: Legal drama) (Broadcaster: CBS)	Tom Koch	Angelo Torres	149	March 1972	
The Mary Tailor-Made Show	The Mary Tyler Moore Show (September 1970 – March 1977) (Genre: Sitcom) (Broadcaster: CBS)	Tom Koch	Angelo Torres	149	March 1972	
Barney	Arnie (September 1970 – March 1972) (Genre: Sitcom) (Broadcaster: CBS)	Tom Koch	Angelo Torres	149	March 1972	
The F.D.A.	The F.B.I. (September 1965 – April 1974) (Genre: Police procedural) (Broadcaster: ABC)	Tom Koch	Angelo Torres	149	March 1972	
Hawaii Channel Five-O	Hawaii Five-O (September 1968 – April 1980) (Genre: Police procedural drama) (Broadcaster: ABC)	Tom Koch	Angelo Torres	149	March 1972	
Messy's Thanksgiving Day Parade	Macy's Thanksgiving Day Parade (Since November 1948) (Genre: Special event) (Broadcaster: NBC)	Dick DeBartolo	Angelo Torres	148	January 1972	
The Putrid Family	The Partridge Family (September 1970 – March 1974) (Genre: Sitcom) (Broadcaster: ABC)	Arnie Kogen	Angelo Torres	150	April 1972	
Miracle Center	Medical Center (September 1969 – March 1976) (Genre: Medical drama) (Broadcaster: CBS)	Dick DeBartolo	Angelo Torres	151	June 1972	
Manic	Mannix (September 1967 – April 1975) (Genre: Crime drama) (Broadcaster: CBS)	Lou Silverstone	Angelo Torres	152	July 1972	
Longshot	Longstreet (September 1971 – March 1972) (Genre: Crime drama) (Broadcaster: ABC)	Stan Hart	Angelo Torres	153	September 1972	
The Mary Tailor-Made Show	The Mary Tyler Moore Show (September 1970 – March 1977) (Genre: Sitcom) (Broadcaster: CBS)	Tom Koch	Angelo Torres	155	December 1972	
Clodumbo	Columbo (September 1971 – May 1978) (Genre: Crime drama) (Broadcaster: NBC)	Lou Silverstone	Angelo Torres	156	January 1973	
The Funny & Glare Show	The Sonny & Cher Show (August 1971 – May 1974) (Genre: Variety) (Broadcaster: CBS)	Dick DeBartolo	Angelo Torres	157	March 1973	
Owem Marshmallow, Attorney at Law	Owen Marshall, Counselor at Law (September 1971 – April 1974) (Genre: Legal drama) (Broadcaster: ABC)	Lou Silverstone	Angelo Torres	159	June 1973	
Cannonball	Cannon (September 1971 – March 1976) (Genre: Undercover cop) (Broadcaster: CBS)	Dick DeBartolo	Jack Davis	160	July 1973	
Idjit Loves Ernie	Bridget Loves Bernie (September 1972 – March 1973) (Genre: Sitcom) (Broadcaster: CBS)	Arnie Kogen	Angelo Torres	161	September 1973	
Bawde	Maude (September 1972 – April 1978) (Genre: Sitcom) (Broadcaster: CBS)	Tom Koch	Angelo Torres	162	October 1973	
Kung Fool	Kung Fu (October 1972 – March 1975) (Genre: Western) (Broadcaster: ABC)	Dick DeBartolo	Mort Drucker	164	January 1974	
The Dulltons	The Waltons (September 1972 – June 1981) (Genre: Family drama) (Broadcaster: CBS)	Lou Silverstone	Angelo Torres	165	March 1974	
M*A*S*H*UGA	M*A*S*H (September 1972 – February 1983) (Genre: Military sitcom) (Broadcaster: CBS)	Stan Hart	Angelo Torres	166	April 1974	
The "Straights" of San Francisco	The Streets of San Francisco (September 1972 – June 1977) (Genre: Police drama) (Broadcaster: ABC)	Dick DeBartolo	Angelo Torres	167	June 1974	
McClod	McCloud (September 1970 – April 1977) (Genre: Police drama) (Broadcaster: NBC)	Lou Silverstone	Angelo Torres	169	September 1974	
The Rookers	The Rookies (September 1972 – March 1976) (Genre: Crime drama) (Broadcaster: ABC)	Dick DeBartolo	Angelo Torres	171	December 1974	
The Six Million Dollars, Man!	The Six Million Dollar Man (January 1974 – March 1978) (Genre: Science fiction) (Broadcaster: ABC)	Lou Silverstone	Angelo Torres	172	January 1975	
Kojerk	Kojak (October 1973 – March 1978) (Genre: Police drama) (Broadcaster: CBS)	Arnie Kogen	Angelo Torres	173	March 1975	
Barnacle Groans	Barnaby Jones (January 1973 – April 1980) (Genre: Crime drama) (Broadcaster: CBS)	Tom Koch	Angelo Torres	175	June 1975	
Cheeko and the Ham	Chico and the Man (September 1974 – July 1978) (Genre: Sitcom) (Broadcaster: NBC)	Stan Hart	Angelo Torres	177	September 1975	
Good Time-Slot	Good Times (February 1974 – January 1980) (Genre: Sitcom) (Broadcaster: CBS)	Larry Siegel	Angelo Torres	182	April 1976	
Barfetta	Baretta (January 1975 – May 1978) (Genre: Crime drama) (Broadcaster: ABC)	Lou Silverstone	Angelo Torres	183	June 1976	
Rhota	Rhoda (September 1974 – December 1978) (Genre: Sitcom) (Broadcaster: CBS)	Arnie Kogen	Angelo Torres	184	July 1976	
Harsky & Stutch	Starsky & Hutch (September 1975 – May 1979) (Genre: Police thriller) (Broadcaster: ABC)	Lou Silverstone	Angelo Torres	185	September 1976	
Keep On Trekkin': The Mad "Star Trek" Musical	Star Trek (September 1966 – June 1969) (Genre: Science fiction) (Broadcaster: NBC)	Frank Jacobs	Mort Drucker	186	October 1976	
Phoolish	Phyllis (September 1975 – March 1977) (Genre: Sitcom) (Broadcaster: CBS)	Larry Siegel	Angelo Torres	186	October 1976	
Crappy Days	Happy Days (January 1974 – September 1984) (Genre: Sitcom) (Broadcaster: ABC)	Arnie Kogen	Angelo Torres	187	December 1976	
The Moronic Woman	The Bionic Woman (January 1976 – May 1978) (Genre: Science fiction) (Broadcaster: ABC & NBC)	Dick DeBartolo	Mort Drucker	188	January 1977	
Welcome Back, Klodder	Welcome Back, Kotter (September 1975 – June 1979) (Genre: Sitcom) (Broadcaster: ABC)	Lou Silverstone	Angelo Torres	189	March 1977	
One Dame at a Time	One Day at a Time (January 1976 – May 1984) (Genre: Sitcom) (Broadcaster: CBS)	Larry Siegel	Angelo Torres	190	April 1977	
The Jazzyslums	The Jeffersons (January 1975 – July 1985) (Genre: Sitcom) (Broadcaster: CBS)	Stan Hart	Angelo Torres	191	June 1977	
Churlie's Angles	Charlie's Angels (September 1976 – June 1981) (Genre: Crime drama) (Broadcaster: ABC)	Lou Silverstone	Angelo Torres	193	September 1977	
Lavoine & Shoiley	Laverne & Shirley (January 1976 – May 1983) (Genre: Sitcom) (Broadcaster: ABC)	Lou Silverstone	Angelo Torres	194	October 1977	
Blarney Miller	Barney Miller (January 1975 – May 1982) (Genre: Sitcom) (Broadcaster: ABC)	Stan Hart	Angelo Torres	195	December 1977	
He's Company	Three's Company (March 1977 – September 1984) (Genre: Sitcom) (Broadcaster: ABC)	Arnie Kogen	Angelo Torres	196	January 1978	
Little House Oh, So Dreary	Little House on the Prairie (September 1974 – March 1983) (Genre: Western) (Broadcaster: NBC)	Dick DeBartolo	Angelo Torres	197	March 1978	
Alas	Alice (August 1976 – March 1985) (Genre: Sitcom) (Broadcaster: CBS)	Lou Silverstone	Angelo Torres	198	April 1978	
What Happened?	What's Happening!! (August 1976 – April 1979) (Genre: Sitcom) (Broadcaster: ABC)	Lou Silverstone	Angelo Torres	199	June 1978	
The Dummy & Mareek Show	The Donny & Marie Show (January 1976 – January 1979) (Genre: Variety) (Broadcaster: ABC)	Dick DeBartolo	Angelo Torres	200	July 1978	
Eight is Too Rough	Eight Is Enough (March 1977 – August 1981) (Genre: Comedy-drama) (Broadcaster: ABC)	Lou Silverstone	Angelo Torres	201	September 1978	
Lust Boat	The Love Boat (September 1977 – February 1987) (Genre: Sitcom) (Broadcaster: ABC)	Dick DeBartolo	Angelo Torres	202	October 1978	
Fantasy "Buy"land	Fantasy Island (January 1978 – May 1984) (Genre: Anthology drama) (Broadcaster: ABC)	Lou Silverstone	Angelo Torres	203	December 1978	
The Incredible Bulk	The Incredible Hulk (March 1978 – May 1982) (Genre: Superhero) (Broadcaster: CBS)	Lou Silverstone	Angelo Torres	204	January 1979	
Lou Grouch	Lou Grant (September 1977 – September 1982) (Genre: Drama) (Broadcaster: CBS)	Tom Koch	Angelo Torres	205	March 1979	
Reject UFO's	Project U.F.O. (February 1978 – July 1979) (Genre: Science fiction) (Broadcaster: NBC)	Dick DeBartolo	Angelo Torres	207	June 1979	
Cattle Car Galaxica	Battlestar Galactica (September 1978 – April 1979) (Genre: Science fiction) (Broadcaster: ABC)	Dick DeBartolo	Angelo Torres	208	July 1979	
Shmork & Windy	Mork & Mindy (September 1978 – May 1982) (Genre: Sitcom) (Broadcaster: ABC)	Lou Silverstone; Dick DeBartolo	Angelo Torres	209	September 1979	
Sixty Seconds	60 Minutes (Since September 1968) (Genre: Newsmagazine) (Broadcaster: CBS)	Lou Silverstone	Jack Davis	210	October 1979	
Vague-$	Vegas (September 1978 – June 1981) (Genre: Crime drama) (Broadcaster: ABC)	Dick DeBartolo	Angelo Torres	210	October 1979	
CHiMPs	CHiPs (September 1977 – May 1983) (Genre: Crime drama) (Broadcaster: NBC)	Lou Silverstone	Angelo Torres	211	December 1979	

=== 1980s ===
Spoofed title	Actual title	Writer	Artist	Issue	Date	Ref
Taxing	Taxi (September 1978 – June 1983) (Genre: Sitcom) (Broadcaster: ABC & NBC)	Stan Hart	Angelo Torres	212	January 1980	
The White, Shadowed	The White Shadow (November 1978 – March 1981) (Genre: Sports drama) (Broadcaster: CBS)	Lou Silverstone	Angelo Torres	214	April 1980	
Six Minutes on "The Return of the Draft"	60 Minutes (Since September 1968) (Genre: News magazine) (Broadcaster: CBS)	Lou Silverstone	Jack Davis	215	June 1980	
Diff'rent Jokes	Diff'rent Strokes (November 1978 – March 1986) (Genre: Sitcom) (Broadcaster: NBC & ABC)	Arnie Kogen	Angelo Torres	215	June 1980	
Bentson	Benson (September 1979 – April 1986) (Genre: Sitcom) (Broadcaster: ABC)	Tom Koch	Angelo Torres	216	July 1980	
The Crockford Files	The Rockford Files (September 1974 – January 1980) (Genre: Crime drama) (Broadcaster: NBC)	Lou Silverstone	Angelo Torres	217	September 1980	
WKRAP in Cincinnati	WKRP in Cincinnati (September 1978 – April 1982) (Genre: Sitcom) (Broadcaster: CBS)	Arnie Kogen	Angelo Torres	218	October 1980	
The Dopes of Haphazzard	The Dukes of Hazzard (January 1979 – February 1985) (Genre: Comedy-drama) (Broadcaster: CBS)	Dick DeBartolo	Angelo Torres	219	December 1980	
Queezy	Quincy, M.E. (October 1976 – May 1983) (Genre: Medical drama) (Broadcaster: NBC)	Lou Silverstone	Angelo Torres	220	January 1981	
Crapper John, M.D.	Trapper John, M.D. (September 1979 – September 1986) (Genre: Medical drama) (Broadcaster: CBS)	Stan Hart	Jack Davis	221	March 1981	
That's Real Incredible, People!	Real People (April 1979 – July 1984) (Genre: Reality) (Broadcaster: NBC) / That's Incredible! (March 1980 – April 1984) (Genre: Reality) (Broadcaster: ABC)	Dick DeBartolo	Angelo Torres	222	April 1981	
Dullus	Dallas (September 1978 – May 1991) (Genre: Soap opera) (Broadcaster: CBS)	Lou Silverstone	Mort Drucker	223	June 1981	
Har To Har	Hart to Hart (September 1979 – May 1984) (Genre: Crime drama) (Broadcaster: ABC)	Lou Silverstone	Angelo Torres	224	July 1981	
Too Gross For Comfort	Too Close for Comfort (November 1980 – February 1987) (Genre: Sitcom) (Broadcaster: ABC)	Stan Hart	Angelo Torres	226	October 1981	
Magnumb, P.U.	Magnum, P.I. (January 1981 – May 1988) (Genre: Crime drama) (Broadcaster: CBS)	Lou Silverstone	Mort Drucker	227	December 1981	
Starchie Bonker's Place	Archie Bunker's Place (September 1979 – April 1983) (Genre: Sitcom) (Broadcaster: CBS)	Arnie Kogen	Mort Drucker	228	January 1982	
Family Fools	Family Feud (Since July 1976) (Genre: Game show) (Broadcaster: ABC & CBS)	Dick DeBartolo	Angelo Torres	229	March 1982	
DeGenerate Hospital	General Hospital (Since April 1963) (Genre: Medical drama) (Broadcaster: ABC)	Lou Silverstone	Mort Drucker	230	April 1982	
Mad's Academy Awards Show	The Academy Awards (Since May 1929) (Genre: Ceremony) (Broadcaster: NBC & ABC)	Stan Hart	Mort Drucker	231	June 1982	
Swill Street Blues	Hill Street Blues (January 1981 – May 1987) (Genre: Police drama) (Broadcaster: NBC)	Tom Koch	Angelo Torres	231	June 1982	
The Greatest American Zero	The Greatest American Hero (March 1981 – February 1983) (Genre: Superhero) (Broadcaster: ABC)	Lou Silverstone	Mort Drucker	232	July 1982	
Six Minutes Looks at Nuclear Power	60 Minutes (Since September 1968) (Genre: News magazine) (Broadcaster: CBS)	Lou Silverstone	Jack Davis	233	September 1982	
The Brawl Guy	The Fall Guy (November 1981 – May 1986) (Genre: Adventure) (Broadcaster: ABC)	Dick DeBartolo	Angelo Torres	233	September 1982	
M*U*S*H	M*A*S*H (September 1972 – February 1983) (Genre: Military sitcom) (Broadcaster: CBS)	Arnie Kogen	Jack Davis	234	October 1982	
A Special Edition of "20/30" Starring Barbara Waltzers	20/20 (Since June 1978) (Genre: Newsmagazine) (Broadcaster: ABC)	Dick DeBartolo	Mort Drucker	234	October 1982	
The Yaks of Life	The Facts of Life (August 1979 – May 1988) (Genre: Sitcom) (Broadcaster: NBC)	Tom Koch	Angelo Torres	235	December 1982	
Private Benjurmind	Private Benjamin (April 1981 – January 1983) (Genre: Sitcom) (Broadcaster: CBS)	Larry Siegel	Angelo Torres	238	April 1983	
Simple & Simple	Simon & Simon (November 1981 – December 1988) (Genre: Detective duo) (Broadcaster: CBS)	Lou Silverstone; Dick DeBartolo	Mort Drucker	239	June 1983	
Give Us A Break!	Gimme a Break! (October 1981 – May 1987) (Genre: Sitcom) (Broadcaster: NBC)	Dick DeBartolo	Angelo Torres	240	July 1983	
Knut Rider	Knight Rider (September 1982 – April 1986) (Genre: Science fiction) (Broadcaster: NBC)	Dick DeBartolo	Angelo Torres	241	September 1983	
Square Dregs	Square Pegs (September 1982 – March 1983) (Genre: Teen sitcom) (Broadcaster: CBS)	Arnie Kogen	Mort Drucker	241	September 1983	
The A(sinine) Team	The A-Team (January 1983 – March 1987) (Genre: Military drama) (Broadcaster: NBC)	Stan Hart	Mort Drucker	242	October 1983	
T.S. Shnooker	T. J. Hooker (March 1982 – May 1986) (Genre: Police drama) (Broadcaster: ABC & CBS)	Lou Silverstone	Angelo Torres	243	December 1983	
Asinine to Five	Nine to Five (March 1982 – October 1983) (Genre: Sitcom) (Broadcaster: ABC)	Dick DeBartolo	Angelo Torres	244	January 1984	
Not-So-New-Hart	Newhart (October 1982 – May 1990) (Genre: Sitcom) (Broadcaster: CBS)	Arnie Kogen	Angelo Torres	245	March 1984	
Matt Houstink	Matt Houston (September 1982 – July 1985) (Genre: Crime drama) (Broadcaster: ABC)	Dick DeBartolo	Angelo Torres	246	April 1984	
AfterMUSH	AfterMASH (September 1983 – May 1985) (Genre: Military sitcom) (Broadcaster: CBS)	Stan Hart	Angelo Torres	247	June 1984	
Remington Steal	Remington Steele (October 1982 – April 1987) (Genre: Comedy-drama) (Broadcaster: NBC)	Lou Silverstone	Angelo Torres	248	July 1984	
Beers	Cheers (September 1982 – May 1993) (Genre: Sitcom) (Broadcaster: NBC)	Arnie Kogen	Angelo Torres	249	September 1984	
Scaredcrow and Mrs. Kling	Scarecrow and Mrs. King (October 1983 – May 1987) (Genre: Drama) (Broadcaster: CBS)	Dick DeBartolo	Angelo Torres	250	October 1984	
Web*Star	Webster (September 1983 – March 1989) (Genre: Sitcom) (Broadcaster: ABC)	Larry Siegel	Angelo Torres	251	December 1984	
Family Tides	Family Ties (September 1982 – May 1989) (Genre: Sitcom) (Broadcaster: NBC)	Larry Siegel	Mort Drucker	252	January 1985	
Hardhassle and McCorny	Hardcastle and McCormick (September 1983 – May 1986) (Genre: Action) (Broadcaster: ABC)	Dick DeBartolo	Angelo Torres	252	January 1985	
Rip-Off-Tide	Riptide (January 1984 – August 1986) (Genre: Crime drama) (Broadcaster: NBC)	Lou Silverstone	Angelo Torres	254	April 1985	
The Clodsby Show	The Cosby Show (September 1984 – April 1992) (Genre: Sitcom) (Broadcaster: NBC)	Larry Siegel	Angelo Torres	255	June 1985	
Mike Hammy	Mike Hammer (January 1984 – January 1985) (Genre: Thriller) (Broadcaster: CBS)	Dick DeBartolo	Sam Viviano	255	June 1985	
Die-Nasty	Dynasty (January 1981 – May 1989) (Genre: Soap opera) (Broadcaster: ABC)	Lou Silverstone	Mort Drucker	256	July 1985	
Mate & Ali-mony	Kate & Allie (March 1984 – May 1989) (Genre: Sitcom) (Broadcaster: CBS)	Dennis Snee	Mort Drucker	257	September 1985	
Gigglin's Island	Gilligan's Island (September 1964–April 1967) (Genre: Sitcom) (Broadcaster: CBS)	Larry Siegel	Sam Viviano	259	December 1985	
Nut Court	Night Court (January 1984 – May 1992) (Genre: Sitcom) (Broadcaster: NBC)	Larry Siegel	Angelo Torres	259	December 1985	
The Crummymooners	The Honeymooners (October 1955 – September 1956) (Genre: Sitcom) (Broadcaster: CBS)	Larry Siegel	Sam Viviano	260	January 1986	
Miami Price	Miami Vice (September 1984 – January 1990) (Genre: Crime drama) (Broadcaster: NBC)	Lou Silverstone	Mort Drucker	261	March 1986	
Murder She Hopes	Murder, She Wrote (September 1984 – May 1996) (Genre: Crime drama) (Broadcaster: CBS)	Dick DeBartolo	Angelo Torres	261	March 1986	
Highway to Heaving	Highway to Heaven (August 1984 – August 1989) (Genre: Supernatural drama) (Broadcaster: NBC)	Dick DeBartolo	Mort Drucker	262	April 1986	
Reprieve it for Beaver	Leave It to Beaver (October 1957 – June 1963) (Genre: Sitcom) (Broadcaster: CBS & ABC)	Dennis Snee	Angelo Torres	262	April 1986	
The Olden Girls	The Golden Girls (September 1985 – May 1992) (Genre: Comedy-drama) (Broadcaster: NBC)	Arnie Kogen	Angelo Torres	263	June 1986	
Moon-Fighting	Moonlighting (March 1985 – May 1989) (Genre: Comedy-drama) (Broadcaster: ABC)	Dick DeBartolo	Mort Drucker	264	July 1986	
Groaning Pains	Growing Pains (September 1985 – April 1992) (Genre: Sitcom) (Broadcaster: ABC)	Lou Silverstone; Dick DeBartolo	Angelo Torres	266	October 1986	
We'll Make a Fortune	Wheel of Fortune (Since January 1975) (Genre: Game show) (Broadcaster: NBC & CBS)	Dick DeBartolo	Harvey Kurtzman; Will Elder	266	October 1986	
Boob's the Boss?	Who's the Boss? (September 1984 – April 1992) (Genre: Sitcom) (Broadcaster: ABC)	Dennis Snee	Mort Drucker	266	October 1986	
Mr. Jolly Rogers' Neighborhood Visits a Local Bank	Mister Rogers' Neighborhood (February 1968 – August 2001) (Genre: Family) (Broadcaster: NET → PBS)	Larry Siegel	Angelo Torres	267	December 1986	
Grabme & Spacey	Cagney & Lacey (March 1982 – May 1988) (Genre: Crime drama) (Broadcaster: CBS)	Dick DeBartolo	Angelo Torres	267	December 1986	
I Love Luny	I Love Lucy (October 1951 – May 1957) (Genre: Sitcom) (Broadcaster: CBS)	Lou Silverstone	Angelo Torres	269	March 1987	
Perfectly Strange	Perfect Strangers (March 1986 – August 1993) (Genre: Sitcom) (Broadcaster: ABC)	Dick DeBartolo	Angelo Torres	270	April 1987	
The Tranquilizer	The Equalizer (September 1985 – August 1989) (Genre: Action) (Broadcaster: CBS)	Dick DeBartolo	Angelo Torres	271	June 1987	
ARFul	ALF (September 1986 – March 1990) (Genre: Sitcom) (Broadcaster: NBC)	Dick DeBartolo	Mort Drucker	272	July 1987	
Forget Smart	Get Smart (September 1965 – May 1970) (Genre: Sitcom) (Broadcaster: NBC & CBS)	Dick DeBartolo	Angelo Torres	272	July 1987	
Amends	Amen (September 1986 – May 1991) (Genre: Sitcom) (Broadcaster: NBC)	Arnie Kogen	Angelo Torres	273	September 1987	
The Andy Grinning Show	The Andy Griffith Show (October 1960 – April 1968) (Genre: Sitcom) (Broadcaster: CBS)	Lou Silverstone	Sam Viviano	273	September 1987	
L.A. Lewd	L.A. Law (September 1985 – May 1994) (Genre: Legal drama) (Broadcaster: NBC)	Frank Jacobs	Mort Drucker	274	October 1987	
Head of the Crass	Head of the Class (September 1986 – June 1991) (Genre: Sitcom) (Broadcaster: ABC)	Frank Jacobs	Angelo Torres	275	December 1987	
ReDesigning Women	Designing Women (September 1986 – May 1993) (Genre: Sitcom) (Broadcaster: CBS)	Dick DeBartolo	Angelo Torres	279	June 1988	
Beauty is the Beast	Beauty and the Beast (September 1987 – August 1990) (Genre: Drama) (Broadcaster: CBS)	Dick DeBartolo	Jack Davis	280	July 1988	
An Indifferent World	A Different World (September 1987 – July 1993) (Genre: Sitcom) (Broadcaster: NBC)	Dick DeBartolo	Angelo Torres	281	September 1988	
St. Healthscare	St. Elsewhere (October 1982 – May 1988) (Genre: Medical drama) (Broadcaster: NBC)	Frank Jacobs	Mort Drucker	281	September 1988	
Double Damp	Double Dare (October 1986 – February 1993) (Genre: Game show) (Broadcaster: Nickelodeon)	Dick DeBartolo	Angelo Torres	282	October 1988	
Star Blecch The Next Degradation	Star Trek: The Next Generation (September 1987 – May 1994) (Genre: Science fiction) (Syndicated)	Frank Jacobs	Mort Drucker	282	October 1988	
Beers	Cheers (September 1982 – May 1993) (Genre: Sitcom) (Broadcaster: NBC)	Debee Ovitz	Mort Drucker	285	March 1989	
The Moron Downer Jr. Show	The Morton Downey Jr. Show (October 1987 – September 1989) (Genre: Talk show) (Broadcaster: WWOR-TV)	Larry Siegel	Jack Davis	286	April 1989	
Thirty-Suffering	Thirtysomething (September 1987 – May 1991) (Genre: Drama) (Broadcaster: ABC)	Frank Jacobs	Mort Drucker	286	April 1989	
21 Junkheap	21 Jump Street (April 1987 – April 1991) (Genre: Crime drama) (Broadcaster: FOX)	Dick DeBartolo	Angelo Torres	286	April 1989	
Grossanne	Roseanne (October 1988 – May 1997) (Genre: Sitcom) (Broadcaster: ABC)	Stan Hart	Mort Drucker	287	June 1989	
Dreary John	Dear John (October 1988 – July 1992) (Genre: Sitcom) (Broadcaster: NBC)	Dick DeBartolo	Sam Viviano	288	July 1989	
Murky Brown	Murphy Brown (November 1988 – May 1998) (Genre: Sitcom) (Broadcaster: CBS)	Dick DeBartolo	Angelo Torres	289	September 1989	
The ABC Misery Movie	The ABC Mystery Movie (February 1989 – August 1990) (Genre: Movie of the week) (Broadcaster: ABC)	Dick DeBartolo	Angelo Torres	290	October 1989	
The Blunder Years	The Wonder Years (January 1988 – May 1993) (Genre: Comedy-drama) (Broadcaster: ABC)	Stan Hart	Sam Viviano	291	December 1989	

=== 1990s ===
Spoofed title	Actual title	Writer	Artist	Issue	Date	Ref
Six Minutes Looks at Smoking	60 Minutes (Since September 1968) (Genre: News magazine) (Broadcaster: CBS)	Lou Silverstone	Angelo Torres	292	January 1990	
Buried with Children	Married... with Children (April 1987 – June 1997) (Genre: Sitcom) (Broadcaster: FOX)	Dennis Snee	Sam Viviano	292	January 1990	
Dorky Housecall, M.D.	Doogie Howser, M.D. (September 1989 – July 1993) (Genre: Medical comedy-drama) (Broadcaster: ABC)	Dick DeBartolo	Angelo Torres	294	April 1990	
Empty Mess	Empty Nest (October 1988 – April 1995) (Genre: Sitcom) (Broadcaster: NBC)	Josh Gordon	Mort Drucker	294	April 1990	
Roach!	Coach (February 1989 – May 1997) (Genre: Sports sitcom) (Broadcaster: ABC)	Stan Hart	Angelo Torres	296	July 1990	
America's Phoniest Home Videos Visits Fool House	America's Funniest Home Videos (Since November 1989) (Genre: Reality) (Broadcaster: ABC) and Full House (September 1987 – May 1995) (Genre: Sitcom) (Broadcaster: ABC)	Dick DeBartolo	Mort Drucker	297	September 1990	
MacGimmick	MacGyver (September 1985 – May 1992) (Genre: Action) (Broadcaster: ABC)	Dick DeBartolo	Angelo Torres	302	April 1991	
Stale Prince of Belch Air	The Fresh Prince of Bel-Air (September 1990 – May 1996) (Genre: Sitcom) (Broadcaster: NBC)	Stan Hart	Mort Drucker	303	June 1991	
Major Dud	Major Dad (September 1989 – April 1993) (Genre: Sitcom) (Broadcaster: CBS)	Dick DeBartolo	Angelo Torres	303	June 1991	
Unsolved Miseries	Unsolved Mysteries (January 1987 – April 2010) (Genre: Documentary) (Broadcaster: NBC & CBS)	Andrew J. Schwartzberg	Jack Davis	304	July 1991	
Father Jowly Miseries	Father Dowling Mysteries (November 1987 – May 1991) (Genre: Crime drama) (Broadcaster: NBC & ABC)	Dick DeBartolo	Angelo Torres	305	September 1991	
Familiar Matters	Family Matters (September 1989 – July 1998) (Genre: Sitcom) (Broadcaster: ABC & CBS)	Dick DeBartolo	Mort Drucker	307	December 1991	
Snorin' Exposure	Northern Exposure (July 1990 – July 1995) (Genre: Comedy-drama) (Broadcaster: CBS)	Stan Hart	Angelo Torres	308	January 1992	
Beverly Hills 911	Beverly Hills, 90210 (October 1990 – May 2000) (Genre: Teen drama) (Broadcaster: FOX)	Dennis Snee	Mort Drucker	309	March 1992	
Quandary Heap	Quantum Leap (March 1989 – May 1993) (Genre: Science fiction) (Broadcaster: NBC)	Dick DeBartolo	Angelo Torres	309	March 1992	
Love Corruption	Love Connection (September 1983 – July 1994) (Genre: Game show) (Broadcaster: Broadcast syndication)	Dick DeBartolo	Angelo Torres	310	April 1992	
50/50 Reports on Sleaze Biographers	20/20 (Since June 1978) (Genre: Newsmagazine) (Broadcaster: ABC)	Charlie Kadau; Joe Raiola	Mort Drucker	310	April 1992	
Gnome Improvement	Home Improvement (September 1991 – May 1999) (Genre: Sitcom) (Broadcaster: ABC)	A.J. Marley	Angelo Torres	311	June 1992	
Evening Shame	Evening Shade (September 1990 – May 1994) (Genre: Sitcom) (Broadcaster: CBS)	Dennis Snee	Angelo Torres	313	July 1992	
American Radiators	American Gladiators (September 1989 – May 1996) (Genre: Game show) (Broadcaster: Broadcast syndication)	Dick DeBartolo; Andrew J. Schwartzberg	Al Jaffee	315	December 1992	
Entertainment Too Light Visits In Livid Color	Entertainment Tonight (Since September 1981) (Genre: Entertainment news) (Broadcaster: Broadcast syndication) and In Living Color (April 1990 – May 1994) (Genre: Sketch comedy) (Broadcaster: FOX)	A. J. Marley	Sam Viviano	317	March 1993	
Smellgross Place	Melrose Place (July 1992 – May 1999) (Genre: Soap opera) (Broadcaster: FOX)	Dick DeBartolo	Mort Drucker	317	March 1993	
Blah-sum	Blossom (January 1991 – May 1995) (Genre: Sitcom) (Broadcaster: NBC)	Dennis Snee	Angelo Torres	318	April 1993	
Star Blecch Deep Space Swine	Star Trek: Deep Space Nine (January 1993 – June 1999) (Genre: Science fiction) (Broadcaster: Broadcast syndication)	Frank Jacobs	Mort Drucker	321	September 1993	
Batsman: The Anemic Series	Batman: The Animated Series (September 1992 – September 1995) (Genre: Animated superhero) (Broadcaster: Fox Kids)	Dick DeBartolo	Sam Viviano	322	October 1993	
Miscue 911	Rescue 911 (April 1989 – August 1996) (Genre: Docudrama) (Broadcaster: CBS)	Dick DeBartolo	Jack Davis	326	March/April 1994	
Swinefilled	Seinfeld (May 1990 – May 1998) (Genre: Sitcom) (Broadcaster: NBC)	Stan Hart	Mort Drucker	327	May 1994	
Ecch-Men	X-Men (October 1992 – September 1997) (Genre: Animated superhero) (Broadcaster: Fox Kids)	Dick DeBartolo	Sam Viviano	327	May 1994	
Babewatch	Baywatch (September 1989 – May 2001) (Genre: Action) (Broadcaster: NBC)	Arnie Kogen	Angelo Torres	328	June 1994	
Law & Disorder	Law & Order (September 1990 – May 2010) (Genre: Legal drama) (Broadcaster: NBC)	Dick DeBartolo	Mort Drucker	328	June 1994	
Flakier	Frasier (September 1993 – May 2004) (Genre: Sitcom) (Broadcaster: NBC)	Dick DeBartolo	Paul Coker	329	July/August 1994	
NYPD Boobs	NYPD Blue (September 1993 – March 2005) (Genre: Comedy-drama) (Broadcaster: ABC)	Stan Hart	Mort Drucker	329	July/August 1994	
Dr. Quack - Modern Woman	Dr. Quinn, Medicine Woman (January 1993 – May 1998) (Genre: Western drama) (Broadcaster: CBS)	Dick DeBartolo	Mort Drucker	330	September 1994	
The Ecch-Files	The X-Files (September 1993 – May 2002) (Genre: Science fiction horror) (Broadcaster: FOX)	Dick DeBartolo	Angelo Torres	335	May 1995	
sickER	ER (September 1994 – April 2009) (Genre: Medical drama) (Broadcaster: NBC)	Dick DeBartolo	Mort Drucker	336	June 1995	
When Beavis & Butt-Head Grow Old!	Beavis and Butt-Head (Since March 1993) (Genre: Adult animated comedy) (Broadcaster: MTV → Paramount+)	Desmond Devlin	Sam Viviano	336	June 1995	
Lutus & Cluck: The New Misadventures of Stuporman	Lois & Clark: The New Adventures of Superman (September 1993 – June 1997) (Genre: Superhero) (Broadcaster: ABC)	Arnie Kogen	Angelo Torres	336	June 1995	
Grace Uninspired	Grace Under Fire (September 1993 – February 1998) (Genre: Sitcom) (Broadcaster: ABC)	A. J. Marley	Angelo Torres	338	August 1995	
Fiends	Friends (September 1994 – May 2004) (Genre: Sitcom) (Broadcaster: NBC)	Josh Gordon	Mort Drucker	339	September 1995	
Star Blecch Voyeur	Star Trek: Voyager (January 1995 – May 2001) (Genre: Science fiction) (Broadcaster: UPN)	Dick DeBartolo	Angelo Torres	339	September 1995	
Too Bad About You	Mad About You (September 1992 – May 1999) (Genre: Sitcom) (Broadcaster: NBC)	Josh Gordon	Sam Viviano	342	January/February 1996	
The Ninny	The Nanny (November 1993 – June 1999) (Genre: Sitcom) (Broadcaster: CBS)	Josh Gordon	Angelo Torres	342	January/February 1996	
sleepWalker, Texas Stranger	Walker, Texas Ranger (September 1993 – May 2001) (Genre: Crime drama) (Broadcaster: CBS)	Dick DeBartolo	Angelo Torres	343	March 1996	
Carolwhine Sitting Pretty	Caroline in the City (September 1995 – April 1999) (Genre: Sitcom) (Broadcaster: NBC)	Josh Gordon	Paul Coker	345	May 1996	
Smellen	Ellen (March 1994 – July 1998) (Genre: Sitcom) (Broadcaster: ABC)	A. J. Marley	Sam Viviano	346	June 1996	
Jerkules	Hercules: The Legendary Journeys (January 1995 – November 1999) (Genre: Sword & sorcery) (Broadcaster: Broadcast syndication)	Dick DeBartolo	Angelo Torres	349	September 1996	
Zima	Xena: Warrior Princess (September 1995 – June 2001) (Genre: Sword & sorcery) (Broadcaster: Broadcast syndication)	Dick DeBartolo	Angelo Torres	349	September 1996	
Single Louts	Singled Out (June 1995 – May 1998) (Genre: Game show) (Broadcaster: MTV)	Mike Snider	Bill Wray	350	October 1996	
Tortured by an Angel	Touched by an Angel (September 1994 – April 2003) (Genre: Fantasy drama) (Broadcaster: CBS)	Dick DeBartolo	Sam Viviano	353	January 1997	
The Sinking Guy	The Single Guy (September 1995 – April 1997) (Genre: Sitcom) (Broadcaster: NBC)	Josh Gordon	Angelo Torres	355	March 1997	
Spit City	Spin City (September 1996 – April 2002) (Genre: Sitcom) (Broadcaster: ABC)	Josh Gordon	Mort Drucker	355	March 1997	
Mil-lemon-ium	Millennium (October 1996 – May 1999) (Genre: Supernatural drama) (Broadcaster: FOX)	Dick DeBartolo	Angelo Torres	358	June 1997	
The Droop Carey Show	The Drew Carey Show (September 1995 – September 2004) (Genre: Sitcom) (Broadcaster: ABC)	Josh Gordon	Angelo Torres	364	December 1997	
Bob Villa's Home Aghast	Bob Vila's Home Again (September 1990 – December 2007) (Genre: Reality) (Broadcaster: Broadcast syndication)	Dick DeBartolo	Sam Viviano	366	February 1998	
Busty the Vampire Spayer	Buffy the Vampire Slayer (March 1997 – May 2003) (Genre: Supernatural teen drama) (Broadcaster: The WB & UPN)	Dick DeBartolo	Angelo Torres	367	March 1998	
Ally's Appeal	Ally McBeal (September 1997 – May 2002) (Genre: Legal comedy-drama) (Broadcaster: FOX)	Josh Gordon	Mort Drucker	370	June 1998	
Everybody Loathes Raymud	Everybody Loves Raymond (September 1996 – May 2005) (Genre: Sitcom) (Broadcaster: CBS)	Dick DeBartolo	Angelo Torres	372	August 1998	
Just Spoof Me!	Just Shoot Me! (March 1997 – August 2003) (Genre: Sitcom) (Broadcaster: NBC)	Josh Gordon	Mort Drucker	372	August 1998	
Dr. Katz, Professional Therapist Moves to South Park	Dr. Katz, Professional Therapist (May 1995 – February 2002) (Genre: Adult animated sitcom) (Broadcaster: Comedy Central) and South Park (Since August 1997) (Genre: Adult animated sitcom) (Broadcaster: Comedy Central & Paramount+)	Mike Snider	Grey Blackwell	375	November 1998	
JAB	JAG (September 1995 – April 2005) (Genre: Legal drama) (Broadcaster: NBC & CBS)	Dick DeBartolo	Angelo Torres	377	January 1999	
Kharma & Dreg	Dharma & Greg (September 1997 – April 2002) (Genre: Sitcom) (Broadcaster: ABC)	Josh Gordon	Angelo Torres	379	March 1999	
Scenes from the Antiques Freakshow	Antiques Roadshow (Since January 1997) (Genre: Antique auction) (Broadcaster: PBS)	Charlie Richards	Bill Wray	381	May 1999	
Sub-brainy The Teenage Wretch	Sabrina the Teenage Witch (September 1996 – April 2003) (Genre: Fantasy teen sitcom) (Broadcaster: ABC & The WB)	Dick DeBartolo	Paul Coker	381	May 1999	
NYPD Re-Do	NYPD Blue (September 1993 – March 2005) (Genre: Comedy-drama) (Broadcaster: ABC)	Arnie Kogen	Mort Drucker	382	June 1999	
Hokéycon	Pokémon (Since September 1998) (Genre: Animated fantasy) (Broadcaster: Kids' WB & Cartoon Network → Disney XD → Netflix)	Desmond Devlin	Gary Hallgren	386	October 1999	
Moronica's Closet	Veronica's Closet (September 1997 – June 2000) (Genre: Sitcom) (Broadcaster: NBC)	Josh Gordon	Angelo Torres	388	December 1999	

=== 2000s ===
Spoofed title	Actual title	Writer	Artist	Issue	Date	Ref
The Supremos	The Sopranos (January 1999 – June 2007) (Genre: Crime drama) (Broadcaster: HBO)	Arnie Kogen	Mort Drucker	389	January 2000	
Wilt & Craze	Will & Grace (September 1998 – April 2020) (Genre: Sitcom) (Broadcaster: NBC)	Josh Gordon	Angelo Torres	390	February 2000	
7th Heaving	7th Heaven (August 1996 – May 2007) (Genre: Family drama) (Broadcaster: The WB → The CW)	Dennis Snee	Angelo Torres	391	March 2000	
Dudson's Geeks	Dawson's Creek (January 1998 – May 2003) (Genre: Teen drama) (Broadcaster: The WB)	Josh Gordon	Ray Alma	392	April 2000	
Boobs Want to be a Millionaire	Who Wants to Be a Millionaire (September 1998 – March 2021) (Genre: Game show) (Broadcaster: ABC)	Desmond Devlin	Gary Hallgren	392	April 2000	
The Malpractice	The Practice (March 1997 – May 2004) (Genre: Legal drama) (Broadcaster: ABC)	Josh Gordon	Mort Drucker	394	June 2000	
Angle	Angel (October 1999 – May 2004) (Genre: Supernatural fiction) (Broadcaster: The WB)	Dick DeBartolo	Angelo Torres	396	August 2000	
Survivoyeur	Survivor (Since May 2000) (Genre: Reality) (Broadcaster: CBS)	Dick DeBartolo	Bill Wray	398	October 2000	
Totally Repulsed Live	Total Request Live (September 1998 – November 2008) (Genre: Music chart) (Broadcaster: MTV)	Desmond Devlin	Ray Alma	399	November 2000	
The Worst Wing	The West Wing (September 1999 – May 2006) (Genre: Political drama) (Broadcaster: NBC)	Arnie Kogen	Mort Drucker	402	February 2001	
Malcontent in the Muddle	Malcolm in the Middle (January 2000 – May 2006) (Genre: Sitcom) (Broadcaster: FOX)	Desmond Devlin	Tom Richmond	403	March 2001	
C.S.OY	CSI: Crime Scene Investigation (October 2000 – September 2015) (Genre: Crime drima) (Broadcaster: CBS)	Dick DeBartolo	Angelo Torres	405	June 2001	
Sluts in the City	Sex and the City (June 1998 – February 2004) (Genre: Romantic comedy) (Broadcaster: HBO)	Josh Gordon	Mort Drucker	407	July 2001	
Bicker	Becker (November 1998 – January 2004) (Genre: Sitcom) (Broadcaster: CBS)	Dick DeBartolo	Mort Drucker	408	September 2001	
The King-size of Queens	The King of Queens (September 1998 – May 2007) (Genre: Sitcom) (Broadcaster: CBS)	Josh Gordon	Angelo Torres	408	September 2001	
The Wicked Link!	Weakest Link (April 2001 – May 2003) (Genre: Game show) (Broadcaster: NBC)	Dick DeBartolo	Bill Wray	409	October 2001	
Boston Pubic	Boston Public (October 2000 – January 2004) (Genre: Drama) (Broadcaster: FOX)	Desmond Devlin	Tom Richmond	413	January 2002	
America's Most Wanton!	America's Most Wanted (February 1988 – October 2012) (Genre: Reality) (Broadcaster: FOX)	Dick DeBartolo	Tom Richmond	414	February 2002	
Eh!	Ed (October 2000 – February 2004) (Genre: Comedy-drama) (Broadcaster: NBC)	Josh Gordon	Angelo Torres	414	February 2002	
Smellville	Smallville (October 2001 – May 2011) (Genre: Superhero teen drama) (Broadcaster: The WB → The CW)	Dick DeBartolo	Mort Drucker	415	March 2002	
Six Feet Blunder	Six Feet Under (June 2001 – August 2005) (Genre: Comedy-drama) (Broadcaster: HBO)	Charlie Kadau	Angelo Torres	418	June 2002	
Endless-Prize	Enterprise (September 2001 – May 2005) (Genre: Science fiction) (Broadcaster: UPN)	Desmond Devlin	Mort Drucker	420	August 2002	
Schlubs	Scrubs (October 2001 – March 2010) (Genre: Medical comedy-drama) (Broadcaster: NBC & ABC)	Charlie Kadau	Tom Richmond	426	February 2003	
24 Viewers	24 (November 2001 – May 2010) (Genre: Action) (Broadcaster: FOX)	Dick DeBartolo	Bob Julian	429	May 2003	
C.S.Oy: Miami	CSI: Miami (September 2002 – April 2012) (Genre: Crime drama) (Broadcaster: CBS)	Arnie Kogen	Mort Drucker	431	July 2003	
8 Simple Rules for Writing a Mad Spoof of a Dopey ABC-TV Sitcom	8 Simple Rules for Dating My Teenage Daughter (September 2002 – April 2005) (Genre: Sitcom) (Broadcaster: ABC)	Josh Gordon	Angelo Torres	434	October 2003	
Trashing Places	Trading Spaces (October 2000 – December 2008) (Genre: Reality) (Broadcaster: TLC)	Dick DeBartolo	Tom Richmond	435	November 2003	
The Blue Shield	The Shield (March 2002 – November 2008) (Genre: Crime drama) (Broadcaster: FX)	Charlie Kadau	Angelo Torres	437	January 2004	
Absurd, Their Enthusiasm	Curb Your Enthusiasm (Since October 2000) (Genre: Sitcom) (Broadcaster: HBO)	Josh Gordon	Angelo Torres	438	February 2004	
Joan of Archaic	Joan of Arcadia (September 2003 – April 2005) (Genre: Fantasy) (Broadcaster: CBS)	Josh Gordon	Mort Drucker	440	April 2004	
Ailing-Us	Alias (September 2001 – May 2006) (Genre: Action) (Broadcaster: ABC)	Dick DeBartolo	Hermann Mejía	441	May 2004	
Everwooden	Everwood (September 2002 – June 2006) (Genre: Drama) (Broadcaster: The WB)	Josh Gordon	Mort Drucker	441	May 2004	
The O.D.	The O.C. (August 2003 – February 2007) (Genre: Teen comedy-drama) (Broadcaster: FOX)	Dennis Snee	Tom Richmond	442	June 2004	
The Prize is Slight!	The Price Is Right (Since September 1972) (Genre: Game show) (Broadcaster: CBS)	Dick DeBartolo	Tom Bunk	442	June 2004	
Weird Eye on the Queer Guise	Queer Eye for the Straight Guy (July 2003 – October 2007) (Genre: Reality) (Broadcaster: Bravo)	Dave Croatto	Tom Richmond	443	July 2004	
VH1's The Behind of the Music: Def Leppard Drummer Rick Allen's Left Arm	Behind the Music (August 1997 – November 2022) (Genre: Documentary) (Broadcaster: VH1 → Paramount+)	Evan Dorkin	Evan Dorkin	443	July 2004	
Las Vaguest	Las Vegas (September 2003 – February 2008) (Genre: Comedy-drama) (Broadcaster: NBC)	Charlie Kadau	Mort Drucker	444	August 2004	
Old Case	Cold Case (September 2003 – May 2010) (Genre: Crime) (Broadcaster: CBS)	Arnie Kogen	Angelo Torres	446	October 2004	
Without a Trace of Interest	Without a Trace (September 2002 – May 2009) (Genre: Crime drama) (Broadcaster: CBS)	Arnie Kogen	Angelo Torres	446	October 2004	
The Burning Mad Show	The Bernie Mac Show (November 2001 – April 2006) (Genre: Sitcom) (Broadcaster: FOX)	David Shayne	Tom Richmond	447	November 2004	
Lewd & Disorder: Criminal Malcontent	Law & Order: Criminal Intent (September 2001 – June 2011) (Genre: Legal drama) (Broadcaster: NBC & USA Network)	Dick DeBartolo	Tom Richmond	449	January 2005	
Two and a Half Wits	Two and a Half Men (September 2003 – February 2015) (Genre: Sitcom) (Broadcaster: CBS)	Arnie Kogen	Tom Richmond	450	February 2005	
Dreadwood	Deadwood (March 2004 – August 2006) (Genre: Western) (Broadcaster: HBO)	Arnie Kogen	Mort Drucker	452	April 2005	
Disparate No-Lives	Desperate Housewives (October 2004 – May 2012) (Genre: Comedy-drama) (Broadcaster: ABC)	David Shayne	Mort Drucker	453	May 2005	
Lots	Lost (September 2004 – May 2010) (Genre: Science fiction drama) (Broadcaster: ABC)	Dick DeBartolo	Tom Richmond	453	May 2005	
Tedium	Medium (January 2005 – January 2011) (Genre: Supernatural drama) (Broadcaster: NBC & CBS)	Dick DeBartolo	Tom Richmond	454	June 2005	
Dump My Ride	Pimp My Ride (March 2004 – May 2007) (Genre: Reality) (Broadcaster: MTV)	Dave Croatto	Tom Richmond	456	August 2005	
Selected Scenes from Trading Spouses - Special Animated Edition: Marge Simpson and Lois Griffin	Trading Spouses (July 2004 – May 2007) (Genre: Reality), The Simpsons (Since December 1989) (Genre: Animated sitcom) and Family Guy (Since January 1999) (Genre: Adult animated sitcom) (Broadcaster: Fox)	Charlie Kadau	Gary Hallgren	458	October 2005	
C.S.Oy: NY	CSI: NY (September 2004 – February 2013) (Genre: Crime drama) (Broadcaster: CBS)	Arnie Kogen	Mort Drucker	459	November 2005	
Extreme Once-Over Home Repetition	Extreme Makeover: Home Edition (January 2004 – December 2012) (Genre: Reality) (Broadcaster: ABC)	Dick DeBartolo	Tom Richmond	460	December 2005	
Louse, S.O.B.	House, M.D. (November 2004 – May 2012) (Genre: Medical drama) (Broadcaster: FOX)	Arnie Kogen	Mort Drucker	462	February 2006	
Everybody Berates Chris	Everybody Hates Chris (September 2005 – May 2009) (Genre: Sitcom) (Broadcaster: UPN → The CW)	Arnie Kogen	Tom Richmond	463	March 2006	
Prison Fake	Prison Break (August 2005 – May 2009) (Genre: Crime drama) (Broadcaster: FOX)	Dick DeBartolo	Mort Drucker	465	May 2006	
Dull or Not Dull?	Deal or No Deal (January 2006 – May 2010) (Genre: Game show) (Broadcaster: NBC)	Dick DeBartolo	Hermann Mejía	466	June 2006	
Yell's Kitchen	Hell's Kitchen (Since May 2005) (Genre: Cooking competition) (Broadcaster: FOX)	Dick DeBartolo	Tom Richmond	470	October 2006	
How Lame Is Earl	My Name Is Earl (September 2005 – May 2009) (Genre: Sitcom) (Broadcaster: NBC)	David Shayne	Mort Drucker	470	October 2006	
Groin's Monotony	Grey's Anatomy (Since March 2005) (Genre: Medical drama) (Broadcaster: ABC)	Arnie Kogen	Tom Richmond	472	December 2006	
Naggy 911	Nanny 911 (November 2004 – June 2009) (Genre: Reality) (Broadcaster: FOX & CMT)	Dick DeBartolo	Tom Bunk	475	March 2007	
The Amazing Rut!	The Amazing Race (Since September 2001) (Genre: Reality) (Broadcaster: CBS)	Dick DeBartolo	Hermann Mejía	476	April 2007	
Entergarbage	Entourage (July 2004 – September 2011) (Genre: Comedy-drama) (Broadcaster: HBO)	Arnie Kogen	Tom Richmond	476	April 2007	
The Biggest Lardass	The Biggest Loser (Since October 2004) (Genre: Reality) (Broadcaster: NBC)	Desmond Devlin	Tom Bunk	477	May 2007	
My Stupid Spoiled 16	My Super Sweet 16 (January 2005 – June 2008) (Genre: Reality) (Broadcaster: MTV)	Dave Croatto	Hermann Mejía	477	May 2007	
Dud the Lousy Hunter	Dog the Bounty Hunter (August 2004 – June 2012) (Genre: Reality) (Broadcaster: A&E)	Dennis Snee	Tom Richmond	478	June 2007	
Lewd & Disorder: It's P.U.	Law & Order: Special Victims Unit (Since September 1999) (Genre: Legal drama) (Broadcaster: NBC)	Arnie Kogen	Mort Drucker	478	June 2007	
America's Next Top Mobster (not technically a satire)	America's Next Top Model (Since May 2003) (Genre: Reality) (Broadcaster: UPN → The CW)	Desmond Devlin	Tom Richmond	482	October 2007	
1 Is Worse Than 100	1 vs. 100 (October 2006 – January 2011) (Genre: Game show) (Broadcaster: NBC & GSN)	Dick DeBartolo	Tom Bunk	483	November 2007	
Man vs. Wild... At The Mall	Man vs. Wild (March 2006 – November 2011) (Genre: Reality) (Broadcaster: Discovery Channel)	David Shayne	Hermann Mejía	486	February 2008	
Zeroes	Heroes (September 2006 – February 2010) (Genre: Science fiction drama) (Broadcaster: NBC)	Desmond Devlin	Tom Richmond	487	March 2008	
MONKey	Monk (July 2002 – December 2009) (Genre: Police comedy-drama) (Broadcaster: USA Network)	Charlie Kadau	Mort Drucker	488	April 2008	
Slomantha? Who Cares!	Samantha Who? (October 2007 – July 2009) (Genre: Sitcom) (Broadcaster: ABC)	Dick DeBartolo	Tom Richmond	489	May 2008	
Deathster	Dexter (October 2006 – September 2013) (Genre: Crime drama) (Broadcaster: Showtime)	Charlie Kadau	Hermann Mejía	490	June 2008	
30 Crock	30 Rock (October 2006 – January 2013) (Genre: Sitcom) (Broadcaster: NBC)	Arnie Kogen	Tom Richmond	490	June 2008	
Dead Celebrity Apprentice	The Celebrity Apprentice (January 2008 – February 2017) (Genre: Reality game show) (Broadcaster: NBC)	Desmond Devlin	Tom Bunk	500	June 2009	

=== 2010s ===
Spoofed title	Actual title	Writer	Artist	Issue	Date	Ref
The Big Bomb Theory	The Big Bang Theory (September 2007 – May 2019) (Genre: Sitcom) (Broadcaster: CBS)	Desmond Devlin	Tom Richmond	503	May 2010	
Glee-tarded	Glee (May 2009 – March 2015) (Genre: Musical comedy-drama) (Broadcaster: Fox)	Arnie Kogen	Tom Richmond	506	December 2010	
Sad Men	Mad Men (July 2007 – May 2015) (Genre: Period drama) (Broadcaster: AMC)	Arnie Kogen	Tom Richmond	508	April 2011	
Undercover Boob	Undercover Boss (February 2010 – April 2022) (Genre: Reality) (Broadcaster: CBS)	Dick DeBartolo	Tom Bunk	508	April 2011	
Muddled Family	Modern Family (September 2009 – April 2020) (Genre: Sitcom) (Broadcaster: ABC)	Arnie Kogen	Tom Richmond	509	June 2011	
Dancing with the Star Wars	Dancing with the Stars (Since June 2005) (Genre: Reality competition) (Broadcaster: ABC → Disney+)	Dave Croatto	Hermann Mejía	509	June 2011	
Yawn Stars	Pawn Stars (Since July 2009) (Genre: Reality) (Broadcaster: History Channel)	Dick DeBartolo	Tom Bunk	510	August 2011	
Parks and Regurgitation	Parks and Recreation (April 2009 – February 2015) (Genre: Political satire mockumentary sitcom) (Broadcaster: NBC)	Arnie Kogen	Tom Richmond	511	October 2011	
The Walking Dud	The Walking Dead (October 2010 – November 2022) (Genre: Post-apocalyptic horror drama) (Broadcaster: AMC)	Desmond Devlin	Hermann Mejía	512	December 2011	
Bigg and Bulky	Mike & Molly (September 2010 – May 2016) (Genre: Sitcom) (Broadcaster: CBS)	Arnie Kogen	Tom Richmond	514	April 2012	
Fading Bad	Breaking Bad (January 2008 – September 2013) (Genre: Crime drama) (Broadcaster: AMC)	Desmond Devlin	Tom Richmond	516	August 2012	
Game of Groans	Game of Thrones (April 2011 – May 2019) (Genre: Fantasy drama) (Broadcaster: HBO)	Desmond Devlin	Hermann Mejía	521	June 2013	
Storage Boors	Storage Wars (Since December 2010) (Genre: Reality) (Broadcaster: A&E)	Dick DeBartolo	Tom Bunk	522	September 2013	
Ho-Hum Land	Homeland (October 2011 – April 2020) (Genre: Espionage thriller) (Broadcaster: Showtime)	David Shayne	Tom Richmond	523	October 2013	
The Swallowing	The Following (January 2013 – May 2015) (Genre: Crime thriller) (Broadcaster: Fox)	Arnie Kogen	Tom Richmond	525	February 2014	
Two Defectives	True Detective (Since January 2014) (Genre: Anthology crime drama) (Broadcaster: HBO)	Arnie Kogen	Tom Richmond	528	August 2014	
Snark Tank	Shark Tank (Since August 2009) (Genre: Reality) (Broadcaster: ABC)	Dick DeBartolo	Tom Richmond	529	October 2014	
Orange Is the New Blecch	Orange Is the New Black (July 2013 – July 2019) (Genre: Comedy-drama) (Broadcaster: Netflix)	Desmond Devlin	Tom Richmond	530	December 2014	
House of Cons	House of Cards (February 2013 – November 2018) (Genre: Political thriller) (Broadcaster: Netflix)	David Shayne	Tom Richmond	532	April 2015	
Few Joke Girls	2 Broke Girls (September 2011 – April 2017) (Genre: Sitcom) (Broadcaster: CBS)	Mike Morse	Tom Bunk	532	April 2015	
Ray Drearyman	Ray Donovan (June 2013 – January 2020) (Genre: Crime drama) (Broadcaster: Showtime)	Arnie Kogen	Tom Richmond	534	August 2015	
MessyChef Junior	MasterChef Junior (Since September 2013) (Genre: Cooking competition) (Broadcaster: Fox)	Dick DeBartolo	Tom Bunk	536	December 2015	
Fixer Hucksters	Fixer Upper (May 2013 – April 2018) (Genre: Reality) (Broadcaster: HGTV)	Dick DeBartolo	Tom Richmond	541	October 2016	
Decimated Survivor	Designated Survivor (September 2016 – June 2019) (Genre: Political thriller drama) (Broadcaster: ABC → Netflix)	Arnie Kogen	Tom Bunk	545	June 2017	
This Wall	The Wall (Since December 2016) (Genre: Game show) (Broadcaster: NBC)	Dick DeBartolo	Tom Richmond	546	August 2017	
Strangely Thin	Stranger Things (July 2016 – December 2025) (Genre: Science fiction horror drama) (Broadcaster: Netflix)	Desmond Devlin	Tom Richmond	548	December 2017	
It's the Great Pumpkin, Charlie Brown - 2017 Edition	It's the Great Pumpkin, Charlie Brown (October 1966) (Genre: Animated Halloween) (Broadcaster: CBS)	Desmond Devlin	Jacob Chabot	548	December 2017	
This is Pus	This Is Us (September 2016 – May 2022) (Genre: Comedy drama) (Broadcaster: NBC)	Desmond Devlin	Tom Richmond	550	April 2018	
Riverdull	Riverdale (January 2017 – August 2023) (Genre: Teen drama) (Broadcaster: The CW)	Ian Boothby	Tom Richmond	1	June 2018	
Comedians in Cars Getting Arrested	Comedians in Cars Getting Coffee (July 2012 – July 2019) (Genre: Comedy talk show) (Broadcaster: Crackle → Netflix)	Reid Harrison; Gene Laufenberg	Anton Emdin	3	October 2018	
Sven, Golly, It's... Svengoolie	Svengoolie (Since September 1970) (Genre: Comedy horror) (Broadcaster: WFLD → WCIU-TV → MeTV)	Ian Boothby	Tom Richmond	4	December 2018	
The Goodest Place	The Good Place (September 2016 – January 2020) (Genre: Fantasy-comedy) (Broadcaster: NBC)	Desmond Devlin	Anton Emdin	6	April 2019	
The Monotonous Mrs. Mazel	The Marvelous Mrs. Maisel (March 2017 – May 2023) (Genre: Period comedy-drama) (Broadcaster: Amazon Prime Video)	Charlie Kadau	Sam Viviano	9	October 2019	
The Manmaid's Tale	The Handmaid's Tale (April 2017 – May 2025) (Genre: Dystopian drama) (Broadcaster: Hulu)	Tammy Golden	Tom Richmond	10	December 2019	

=== 2020s ===
Spoofed title	Actual title	Writer	Artist	Issue	Date	Ref
Dreadliest Carts	Deadliest Catch (Since April 2005) (Genre: Reality) (Broadcaster: Discovery Channel)	Amanda Stellberg	Gideon Kendall	12	April 2020	
Squalid Game	Squid Game (September 2021 – June 2025) (Genre: Dystopian survival thriller horror) (Broadcaster: Netflix)	Desmond Devlin	Tom Richmond	43	June 2025	
Irreverence	Severance (Since February 2022) (Genre: Science fiction psychological thriller) (Broadcaster: Apple TV)	Desmond Devlin	Tom Richmond	47	February 2026	
The Stupido	The Studio (Since March 2025) (Genre: Comedy drama) (Broadcaster: Apple TV)	Desmond Devlin	Tom Richmond	600	August 2026	

== See also ==
- List of film spoofs in Mad
- Mad (magazine)
