= Everything You Always Wanted to Know About Sex* (*But Were Afraid to Ask) =

Everything You Always Wanted to Know About Sex* (*But Were Afraid to Ask) may refer to:

- Everything You Always Wanted to Know About Sex* (*But Were Afraid to Ask) (book), by U.S. physician David Reuben first published in 1969
- Everything You Always Wanted to Know About Sex* (*But Were Afraid to Ask) (film), directed by and starring Woody Allen, a series of vignettes loosely inspired by the book
