= List of The New York Times number-one books of 1970 =

This is a list of books that topped The New York Times best-seller list in 1970.

== Fiction ==
The following list ranks the number-one best-selling fiction books.

Date	Book	Author
January 4	The Godfather	Mario Puzo
January 11	The Godfather	Mario Puzo
January 18	The Godfather	Mario Puzo
January 25	The Godfather	Mario Puzo
February 1	The Godfather	Mario Puzo
February 8	The French Lieutenant's Woman	John Fowles
February 15	The Godfather	Mario Puzo
February 22	The French Lieutenant's Woman	John Fowles
March 1	The French Lieutenant's Woman	John Fowles
March 8	The French Lieutenant's Woman	John Fowles
March 15	The French Lieutenant's Woman	John Fowles
March 22	The French Lieutenant's Woman	John Fowles
March 29	The French Lieutenant's Woman	John Fowles
April 5	The French Lieutenant's Woman	John Fowles
April 12	The French Lieutenant's Woman	John Fowles
April 19	The French Lieutenant's Woman	John Fowles
April 26	The French Lieutenant's Woman	John Fowles
May 3	The French Lieutenant's Woman	John Fowles
May 10	Love Story	Erich Segal
May 17	Love Story	Erich Segal
May 24	Love Story	Erich Segal
May 31	Love Story	Erich Segal
June 7	Love Story	Erich Segal
June 14	Love Story	Erich Segal
June 21	Love Story	Erich Segal
June 28	Love Story	Erich Segal
July 5	Love Story	Erich Segal
July 12	Love Story	Erich Segal
July 19	Love Story	Erich Segal
July 26	Love Story	Erich Segal
August 2	Love Story	Erich Segal
August 9	Love Story	Erich Segal
August 16	Love Story	Erich Segal
August 23	Love Story	Erich Segal
August 30	Love Story	Erich Segal
September 6	Love Story	Erich Segal
September 13	Love Story	Erich Segal
September 20	Love Story	Erich Segal
September 27	Love Story	Erich Segal
October 4	Love Story	Erich Segal
October 11	Love Story	Erich Segal
October 18	Love Story	Erich Segal
October 25	Love Story	Erich Segal
November 1	Love Story	Erich Segal
November 8	Love Story	Erich Segal
November 15	Love Story	Erich Segal
November 22	Love Story	Erich Segal
November 29	Love Story	Erich Segal
December 6	Love Story	Erich Segal
December 13	Love Story	Erich Segal
December 20	Love Story	Erich Segal
December 27	Love Story	Erich Segal

== Nonfiction ==
The following list ranks the number-one best-selling nonfiction books.

Date	Book	Author
January 4	The Selling of the President 1968	Joe McGinniss
January 11	The Selling of the President 1968	Joe McGinniss
January 18	The Selling of the President 1968	Joe McGinniss
January 25	The Selling of the President 1968	Joe McGinniss
February 1	The Selling of the President 1968	Joe McGinniss
February 8	The Selling of the President 1968	Joe McGinniss
February 15	The Selling of the President 1968	Joe McGinniss
February 22	The Selling of the President 1968	Joe McGinniss
March 1	Everything You Always Wanted to Know About Sex	David Reuben
March 8	Everything You Always Wanted to Know About Sex	David Reuben
March 15	Everything You Always Wanted to Know About Sex	David Reuben
March 22	Everything You Always Wanted to Know About Sex	David Reuben
March 29	Everything You Always Wanted to Know About Sex	David Reuben
April 5	Everything You Always Wanted to Know About Sex	David Reuben
April 12	Everything You Always Wanted to Know About Sex	David Reuben
April 19	Everything You Always Wanted to Know About Sex	David Reuben
April 26	Everything You Always Wanted to Know About Sex	David Reuben
April 29	Everything You Always Wanted to Know About Sex	David Reuben
May 3	Up the Organization	Robert Townsend
May 10	Up the Organization	Robert Townsend
May 17	Up the Organization	Robert Townsend
May 24	Up the Organization	Robert Townsend
May 31	Up the Organization	Robert Townsend
June 7	Up the Organization	Robert Townsend
June 14	Everything You Always Wanted to Know About Sex	David Reuben
June 21	Everything You Always Wanted to Know About Sex	David Reuben
June 28	Everything You Always Wanted to Know About Sex	David Reuben
July 5	Everything You Always Wanted to Know About Sex	David Reuben
July 12	Up the Organization	Robert Townsend
July 19	Everything You Always Wanted to Know About Sex	David Reuben
July 26	Everything You Always Wanted to Know About Sex	David Reuben
August 2	Everything You Always Wanted to Know About Sex	David Reuben
August 9	Everything You Always Wanted to Know About Sex	David Reuben
August 16	Everything You Always Wanted to Know About Sex	David Reuben
August 23	Everything You Always Wanted to Know About Sex	David Reuben
August 30	Everything You Always Wanted to Know About Sex	David Reuben
September 6	Everything You Always Wanted to Know About Sex	David Reuben
September 13	Everything You Always Wanted to Know About Sex	David Reuben
September 20	Everything You Always Wanted to Know About Sex	David Reuben
September 27	The Sensuous Woman	"J" (Terry Garrity)
October 4	Everything You Always Wanted to Know About Sex	David Reuben
October 11	Everything You Always Wanted to Know About Sex	David Reuben
October 18	Everything You Always Wanted to Know About Sex	David Reuben
October 25	The Sensuous Woman	"J" (Terry Garrity)
November 1	The Sensuous Woman	"J" (Terry Garrity)
November 8	The Sensuous Woman	"J" (Terry Garrity)
November 15	The Sensuous Woman	"J" (Terry Garrity)
November 22	The Sensuous Woman	"J" (Terry Garrity)
November 29	The Sensuous Woman	"J" (Terry Garrity)
December 6	The Sensuous Woman	"J" (Terry Garrity)
December 13	The Sensuous Woman	"J" (Terry Garrity)
December 20	The Sensuous Woman	"J" (Terry Garrity)
December 27	The Greening of America	Charles A. Reich

== See also ==
- Publishers Weekly list of bestselling novels in the United States in the 1970s
