= Raiola =

Raiola is an Italian surname and may refer to:

- Angela Raiola (1960–2016), American reality television personality also known as "Big Ang"
- Carmine "Mino" Raiola (1967–2022), Italian-Dutch football agent
- Dominic Raiola (born 1978), American football player
- Donovan Raiola (born 1982), American football player
- Dylan Raiola (born 2005), American football player
- Joe Raiola (born 1955), American comedian
