= Cracked (magazine) =

American humor magazine

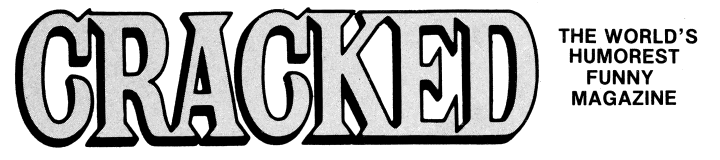

- Cover for the November/December 2006 issue
- Editor: Sol Brodsky (founding editor)
- Categories: Satirical magazine
- Frequency: Monthly
- Publisher: Major Magazines; Globe Publishing; Mega Media
- First issue: March 1958
- Final issue: February 2007
- Country: United States
- Language: English

Cracked was an American humor magazine. Founded in 1958, Cracked proved to be the most durable of the many publications to be launched in the wake of Mad magazine.

In print, Cracked conspicuously copied Mad's layouts and style, and even featured a simpleminded, wide-cheeked mascot, a janitor named Sylvester P. Smythe on its covers, in a manner similar to Mad's Alfred E. Neuman. Unlike Neuman, who appears primarily on covers, Smythe sometimes spoke and was frequently seen inside the magazine, interacting with parody subjects and other regular characters. A 1998 reader contest led to Smythe finally getting a full middle name: "Phooey." An article on Cracked.com, the website which adopted Cracked's name after the magazine ceased publication, joked that the magazine was "created as a knock-off of Mad magazine just over 50 years ago", and it "spent nearly half a century with a fan base primarily comprised of people who got to the store after Mad sold out."

Cracked's publication frequency was reduced in the 1990s, and was erratic in the 2000s. In 2006, the magazine was revived with a new editorial formula that represented a significant departure from its prior Mad style. The new format was more akin to "lad" magazines like Maxim and FHM. The new formula, however, was unsuccessful and Cracked again canceled its print magazine in February 2007 after three issues. Later that year, the brand was carried over to a website, Cracked.com, now owned by Literally Media.

== Early staff ==
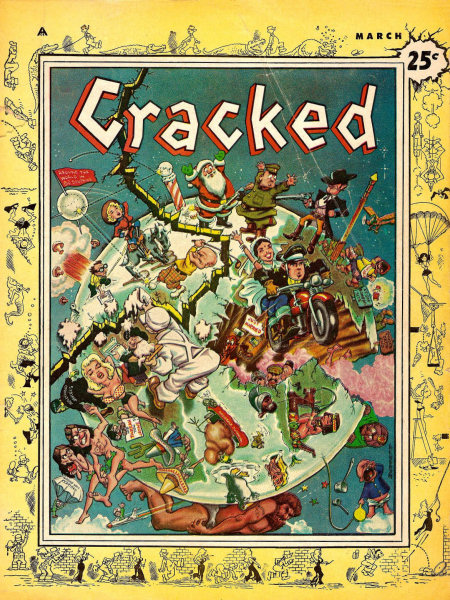
The first issue of Cracked. Art by Bill Everett.

The magazine's first editor was Sol Brodsky, who was better known as a journeyman artist and later production manager and a publishing vice president at Marvel Comics.

Cracked's original publisher, Robert C. Sproul's Major Publications, often imitated other companies' successes in various genres, such as westerns, men's adventure, and the Warren Publications mid-1960s revival of horror comics.

Editor Terry Bisson later recalled, "The whole company was about lowball imitations. The publisher, Robert Sproul, wanted to put out some imitations of western, romance and astrology mags, and I was hired (at about age 27) to put them together because of my romance mag experience... The pseudomags did pretty well (this was a very low end market)." Many of the Cracked contributors also worked on these titles. A number of monster-themed issues were printed under the Cracked umbrella, capitalizing on such publications as Fangoria and Famous Monsters of Filmland. Sproul published Cracked into the 1980s.

However, even as the company chased publishing trends, its long-running flagship title was Cracked Magazine—or Cracked Mazagine, as its cover often read, deliberately misspelling "magazine". (In the same vein, the magazine's website Cracked.com originally referred to itself as a "wesbite.")

== Artists ==
Some notable artists provided art for Cracked, in particular John Severin. Severin was one of the original artists on Mad, and he worked heavily on EC Comics' war books. He was also one of the pre-eminent artists in Western comics. He eventually came to be best known as Cracked's house cartoonist. For almost 40 years, he was the magazine's mainstay artist, frequently illustrating multiple articles in the same issue and virtually all of its covers. Reacting to his own company's obituary of Severin in 2012, Fantagraphics co-publisher Kim Thompson wrote, "I don't think I'm [alone] in thinking of Cracked for most of its run as 'a bunch of crap, and John Severin.'"

The magazine also regularly featured good girl artist Bill Ward, comic book stalwart Howard Nostrand, and gag cartoonists Don Orehek and Charles Rodrigues. In later years, the magazine was a useful training ground for such future independent comic book creators as Rick Altergott, Dan Clowes, and Peter Bagge. Clowes later discussed his childhood ambivalence for the magazine with an interviewer: "No one was ever a fan of Cracked. We would buy Mad every month, but about two weeks later we would get anxious for new material. We would tell ourselves, 'OK, we are not going to buy Cracked. Never again!' And we'd hold out for a while, but then as the month dragged on it just became, 'OK, I guess I'll buy Cracked.' Then you'd bring it home, and immediately you'd remember, 'Oh yeah, I hate Cracked !'"

Other name artists who contributed at least once to Cracked include such Mad veterans as Jack Davis, Will Elder, Al Jaffee, Don Martin, and Basil Wolverton, and such future Mad contributors as Jack Rickard, Angelo Torres, Bill Wray, Greg Theakston, Dennis Snee, Mike Snider, Dean Norman, Charlie Kadau, May Sakami and Tom Richmond. Others included Marvel Comics regulars Steve Ditko and Gene Colan. Jack Kirby contributed once in 1960. In its later days, Cracked found it difficult to attract and retain the level of talent that the better-paying, better-selling Mad could. Richmond, who drew four articles for Cracked, reported on his webpage that he was paid just $100 for a finished page, a small fraction of what he earned for his first Mad assignment. Richmond also wrote about the bad feeling caused by his short tenure at Cracked: "[Editor Dick Kulpa] was very upset about my leaving Cracked for Mad, but let's be real ... not doing so would have been the same as a minor league Triple-A shortstop refusing a call up to the majors. That was no decision at all." Mike Snider had been submitting to both publications, and made the move to Mad after it accepted an article that had already been okayed by Cracked; Snider was obliged to rescind his submission to the lower-paying magazine. One publisher who looked into buying the Cracked operation felt that Mad was "in a class by itself" and that "Cracked couldn't top Mad's lineup".

== Articles and features ==
A typical issue of Cracked included two TV or movie parodies illustrated by Severin. The magazine also published "interview" articles featuring the recurring character Nanny Dickering (Nancy Dickerson was then an investigative newscaster).

One of the magazine's longest-running features was "Shut-Ups", which were two-panel gags in which a character would make an observation or excuse in the first panel, and then be told to "SHUT UP" in the second, as the true situation was visually revealed. "Hudd & Dini" by Vic Martin, a gag strip about two convicts' failed schemes to escape prison, also ran frequently, as did John Severin's Western strip "Sagebrush." Other recurring features included "Ye Hang-Ups", "The Talking Blob", "Spies vs. Sabs" (originally "Saboteurs & Investigators") and, in the 1980s, "the Uggly Family" by Daniel Clowes.

== Titles ==
=== Magazines ===
- Cracked
- Biggest Greatest Cracked
- Cracked Blockbuster
- Cracked Collector's Edition
- Cracked Digest
- Cracked Monster Party
- Cracked Party Pack
- Cracked Shut-Ups
- Cracked Spaced Out
- Cracked Stocking Stuffer
- Cracked Summer Special
- Extra Special Cracked
- For Monsters Only
- Giant Cracked
- King-Sized Cracked
- Super Cracked
- Super Cracked Vol. 2 / Cracked Super

=== Books ===
==== Ace Books ====
Ace Books published four Cracked collections, The Cracked Reader (K-111 NA, 1960), More Cracked, Completely Cracked and Cracked Again (M-146, 1965). Sproul was listed as editor of the 1960 book.

==== Dell Books ====
Dell Publishing produced six collections; Get Me Cracked, Half-Cracked, Cracked Up, Your Cracked, Cracked in the Saddle and It's a Cracked World.

== International editions ==
In the mid-1970s, Cracked moved into foreign markets. In Great Britain, they produced Cracked British Edition, which consisted entirely of reprinted material from the American magazine edited to localize spelling and pop-culture references. In Germany, there were three publications that included Cracked reprints. First was Kaputt, which ran from 1974 to 1983; it was followed by Stupid, which ran from 1983 to 1984, and, finally, Panic. All magazines used original material in addition to the translated Cracked reprints. Articles were often colorized, particularly in Stupid, or printed in black and white with a single added color. Covers were original, but were often reworkings of previous Cracked covers. It was published in Brazil under the name Pancada by Editora Abril, from 1977 to 1980. The content was translated from the English original and adapted to the Brazilian reality of the time (the Democratic and Republican parties were substituted respectively by ARENA and MDB, political parties of that era), and football jokes were made into soccer jokes. Most covers were reused from the original American magazine, but some were made by local artists. Two attempts were made in the 1990s to launch the magazine in Australia.

== Mad raid ==
In 1985, Mort Todd became editor of Cracked magazine at age 23. In 1987, Cracked made waves in the comic industry by seemingly raiding cartoonist Don Martin from rival Mad, after Martin's 32-year career there. Martin had left Mad months earlier due to a royalties dispute for reprints of older material.

Martin worked for Cracked for about six years, and the magazine, in a tweak at its rival, billed him as "Cracked's Crackedest Artist". Cracked's concurrent attempt to sign Mad's caricaturist Mort Drucker was unsuccessful, but the magazine did acquire longtime Mad contributor Lou Silverstone as editor and writer. Former Mad associate editor Jerry DeFuccio also worked at Cracked for a short period.

Though sales of Cracked always lagged far behind those of Mad, Cracked endured for more than four decades through low pay rates and overhead, and by being part of large publishing groups that could bundle Cracked in with its other magazines as a package arrangement for distributors. Cracked also appeared monthly during the period when Mad was being published just 8 times a year, thus picking up readership from Mad fans that couldn't wait out the six weeks for their next "comedy fix." The magazine sometimes included attention-grabbing giveaways inside its pages, such as iron-ons, stickers or postcards.

In the 1990s, Cracked also benefited from the collapse of the National Lampoon, picking up Andy Simmons as an editor, as well as such former Lampoon contributors as Ron Barrett, Randy Jones, and Ed Subitzky. In 1995, Greg Grabianski began his career as a writer and associate editor at Cracked before going on to write for TV and film projects including Beavis & Butthead and the Scary Movie franchise.

== Rise and decline ==
At its height, Cracked's circulation might have been a third of Mad's, with the overall total generally rising or falling along with the bigger magazine's fortunes. But at its nadir in the 2000s, this sales figure plunged to around 25,000–35,000 per bi-monthly issue, or about one-eighth of Mad's monthly circulation, which had also plummeted from its mid-1970s peak of over 2 million per issue.

In late 1999, Cracked's then-parent company, Globe Communications (publisher of the national tabloid The Globe), was sold to American Media, Inc., the company that publishes the tabloids The National Enquirer and the Weekly World News. American Media's primary interest in the deal was in acquiring its rival, The Globe, but Cracked came along as part of the transaction. Writer/editor Barry Dutter said, "One thing you have to realize is that AMI never wanted Cracked; it was just part of a package they bought from Globe Communications."

American Media moved Globe Communications' New York City operations to Florida, where American Media was headquartered. As a result, Cracked's offices moved to Florida as well. Most of the magazine's long-term editors and writers did not move to Florida, leading to a large turnover in Cracked's staff. Published reports indicate that American Media never had an interest in supporting the magazine, which was only selling in the high five figures, compared with AMI's multi-million-selling line of tabloids. Cracked's distribution under American Media grew increasingly sporadic.

In 2000, American Media sold Cracked to one of its former Weekly World News employees, Dick Kulpa, who became both Publisher and Editor-in-Chief of Cracked. Under Kulpa, Cracked suffered from a lack of financing. Combined with Cracked's weakened distribution, circulation continued to drop precipitously, and Kulpa was forced to turn the magazine into a bi-monthly. Dark Horse Star Wars comic editor Peet Janes briefly joined the staff, but financial difficulties at the magazine ended his tenure very quickly. Later, after being offered a substantial pay cut, signature artist John Severin parted company with the magazine.

Cracked was near the center of the 2001 anthrax scare. An anonymous letter containing anthrax powder was sent to American Media Inc. in September 2001, killing one employee. Cracked's offices were still in the same building, and thus the magazine was among the publications that had to be evacuated. As a consequence, the company's archives, containing the magazine's original photographic prints of issues from 1958–2000, had to be destroyed due to contamination. The attack caused Kulpa to put out only four issues that year.

In 2004, Kulpa, new editors Scott Gosar and Marten Jallad, and now Promotions Editor Mark Van Woert, who had been with the magazine since 2000 as its webmaster, attempted one last resuscitation of the original title.

In an effort to generate publicity, Cheap Trick guitarist Rick Nielsen was named as the magazine's new "publisher," but this failed to spark interest. The 365th and final issue featured an "Election Year" cover by science fiction artist Frank Kelly Freas, who had provided many of Mad magazine's covers from 1958–62.

== Sale and rebirth as Cracked.com ==
In early 2005, Kulpa sold Cracked to Teshkeel Media Group, a federation of Arab, Asian, and American investors, who announced plans to revive Cracked with a new editorial focus and redesign. Its first steps included naming entrepreneur Monty Sarhan as both CEO and publisher. Writer Neal Pollack was named "editor-at-large", and former editor Mort Todd was named a contributing editor. However, Todd quickly departed, complaining to The Comics Journal about low pay rates and work-for-hire issues of copyright. Todd said, "With each visit to the offices I got more dispirited as I saw the direction the magazine was taking. As has been well publicized, Cracked was, instead of ripping off MAD, going to rip off Maxim... A lot of 'revolutionary' humor ideas they've come up with are ones that have been overplayed for decades and ones I rejected for good reason 20 years ago [as Cracked's editor]".

Publisher Sarhan responded:

My impression of Mort was that he was stuck in a time warp, wanted to relive his personal "glory days" when he edited CRACKED and didn’t get what we were trying to do.... A Contributing Editor is a freelancer with whom we have a relationship with [sic]. That is all that the title means here at CRACKED. He's a person who is a regular contributor to the magazine, but he is not on staff ... Mort quit as a Contributing Editor because, he said, he had a few TV projects in development. My personal opinion is that he was stuck in the Cracked of the past and that he didn't like being a freelancer, answering to editors far younger than him here at Cracked and having his ideas regularly rejected. If your work isn't going to get published, it makes no sense to stay ... Anyone who has spent five minutes on this website knows that we are not a Maxim clone. It's a ridiculous assertion. We focus on comedy and humor, not women in bikinis. Yes, it's true that we look to MAXIM as a guide for some things. After all, since it's [sic] launch over eight years ago, it has gone on to become one of the most successful magazine titles ever. Who wouldn't want to emulate that success?

On August 15, 2006, the revamped Cracked magazine finally appeared. The first issue was a significant departure from Cracked's previous incarnation, notably in its sharp reduction of comics and illustrated content. The new format was more text-heavy, and was overtly indebted to modern "lad mags" like Maxim, Stuff and FHM, although the media website Gawker.com wrote, "Very little remains of the old Cracked – a Mad ripoff that had tread water in various incarnations for almost half a century. Much was made of the new direction now ripping off Maxim instead, but aside from a "look and feel" resemblance in terms of layout, the much more obvious (attempted) homage runs to Spy."

The Washington Post's Peter Carlson harshly reviewed the debut, listing some of the issue's contents and then adding, "Are you chuckling yet? Me neither." Carlson quoted Cracked's Michael J. Nelson, who'd contributed a short guide to the worst comedy movies ever, saying "Bad comedies are worse than anything else in the whole of human history." Carlson commented, "Reading Cracked, you understand exactly what he means."

After three poor-selling issues, the failing magazine was canceled in February 2007. Citing distribution problems for its demise, editor Jay Pinkerton claimed that the remaining staff would be focusing its energies toward the Cracked website, as well as unspecified book projects. The company's website, Cracked.com, continued and has become known for its humorous lists and compilations, such as "6 Most Ridiculous Things People Claimed to Legally Own". A book collection in that vein, You Might Be a Zombie, and Other Bad News, was published in 2010.

A two-volume history of the magazine, If You're Cracked, You're Happy, written by Mark Arnold, was published in June 2011.

== See also ==
- List of satirical magazines
- List of satirical news websites
- List of satirical television news programs
