= Sol Weinstein =

American novelist

Sol Weinstein (July 29, 1928 — November 25, 2012) was an American humorist, novelist, radio talk-show host, and comedy writer, best known for his series of satirical novels about Israeli secret agent Israel Bond.

== Early life ==
Weinstein was born in Trenton, NJ, where his Ukrainian father was a struggling scrap-metal dealer. Weinstein attended Trenton High School, then dropped out of New York University. He went to work at the Trentonian newspaper, while beginning to freelance as a writer for comics like Jackie Kannon, Alan King, and Joe E. Lewis. This soon led to a full-time career as a comedy writer, contributing not only to comedians but also, for several months in 1965, to MAD. During this time, he wrote the song "The Curtain Falls" for Buddy Lester ("People say I was made for this / Nothin’ else would I trade for this / And just think, I get paid for this…"), which went on to become the signature closing number for singer Bobby Darin. Kevin Spacey sang the song in the 2004 film Beyond the Sea, playing Darin. In the late 1960s, Weinstein also had a talk radio show on WCAU (now WPHT) in Philadelphia, from 10 pm to 2 am.

== The Israel Bond books ==
Weinstein's first novel about Israel Bond, Loxfinger, was published in 1965. The character was a Jewish-inflected parody of James Bond: "He was known as Oy Oy Seven, a status which gave him license to kill. Not only was an Oy Oy holder licensed to kill, but he was also empowered to hold a memorial service over the victim." On the back cover, Weinstein is pictured wearing a trenchcoat and holding a slingshot. The accompanying copy begins, "Fascinating to women, respected by strong silent men, lithe, pantherish, urbane, totally compelling. Author Sol Weinstein, creator of Secret Agent Israel Bond, is none of these, but a man has got to make a living somehow." Three more Israel Bond novels followed: Matzohball (1966), On the Secret Service of His Majesty, the Queen (1966), and You Only Live Until You Die (1968). The first three books were serialized in Playboy magazine. In each book, Weinstein's list of dedications grew longer, expanding to 13 pages by the third novel—ranging from personal friends, to showbiz collaborators like Godfrey Cambridge and Roger Price, to personal idols like Dizzy Gillespie, to "Milton the Florist."

Writing in Sharp magazine in 2015, Naben Ruthnum gave a positive assessment of the Israel Bond series: "The jokes are goofy and delivered at a rattling pace, and his takeoff of Ian Fleming’s style is pretty accurate." As one writer observed, "Where Fleming's Bond always uses specific brand products to show what good taste and luxury he enjoys, Israel Bond details all his paraphernalia with equal praise... but since they're generic Mall labels, the effect is ludicrous. (Bond favors 'Lazy Possum hush puppies by Thom McAn' rather than those black knitted silk ties)."

== Collaboration with Howard Albrecht ==
In the early Seventies, Weinstein moved to Los Angeles, teamed up with Howard Albrecht, and began writing for television variety shows like The Bobby Darin Show, NBC Follies, and The Dean Martin Celebrity Roast. Moving on to situation comedies, Weinstein and Albrecht wrote for numerous series, including Maude, Barney Miller, The Jeffersons, Chico and the Man, and Three's Company, as well as 26 episodes of The Love Boat. During this time, Weinstein collaborated with Albrecht on several books parodying bestsellers of the time, such as The Oddfather (1973), Jonathan Segal Chicken (1973), and The Exerciser (1974), as well as the Henry Kissinger-inspired Oh Henry! (1973). Writing solo, Weinstein also parodied David Reuben's Everything You Always Wanted to Know About Sex as Everything You Never Wanted to Know About Sex (1971). Weinstein and Albrecht wrote one further novel, Grab It!, which was not published until 2020.

== Personal life ==
Weinstein married Eleanor Eisner in 1955, and had two children, David and Judee. His wife died in the early 1980s, and Weinstein moved to Plimmerton, New Zealand in 2002, where his son already lived. He died in Wellington in 2012.
