= Sam Viviano =

American cartoonist (born 1953)

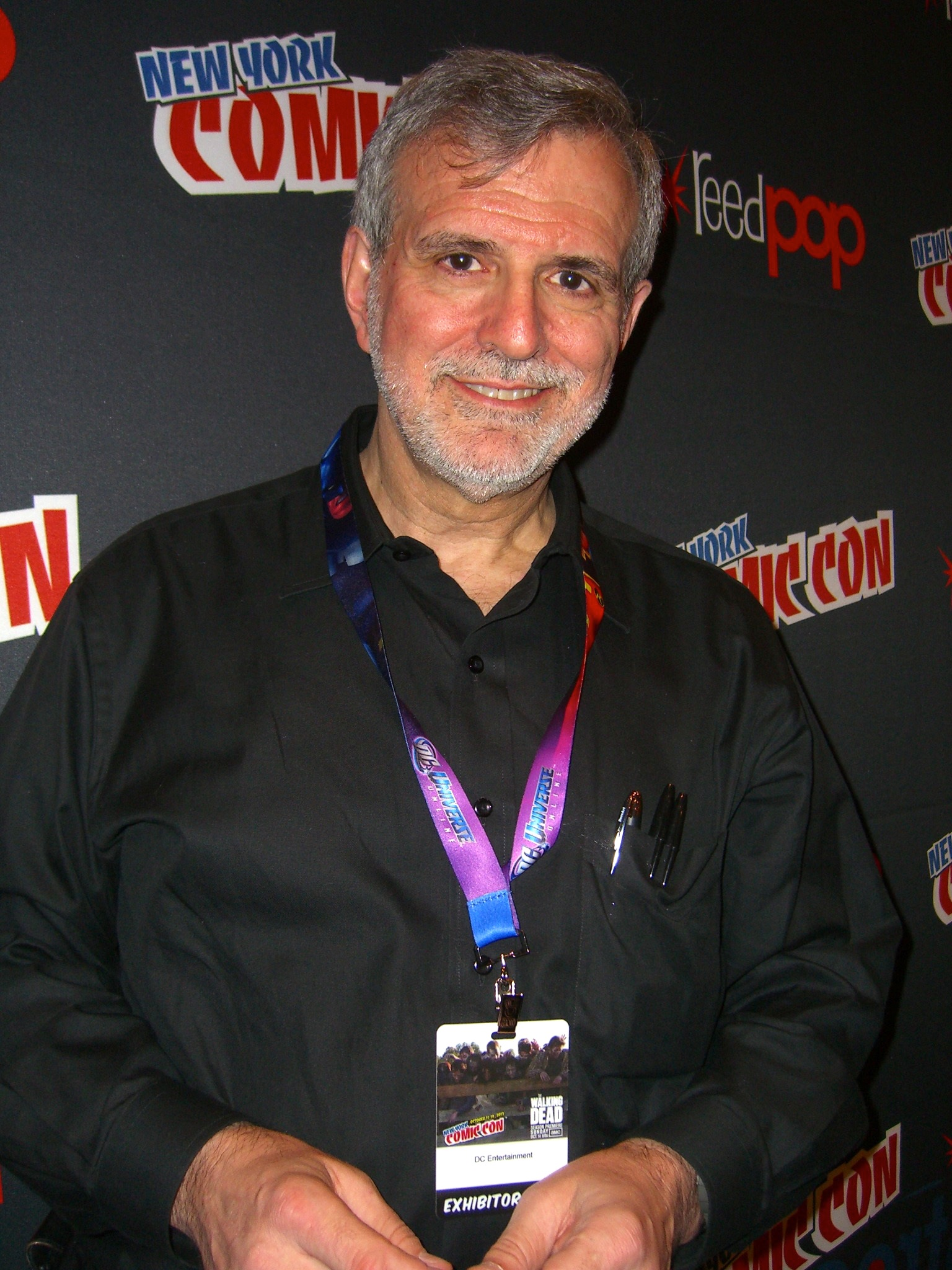
- Viviano at the 2012 New York Comic Con
- Born: March 13, 1953 (age 73) Detroit, Michigan
- Areas: Caricature, Art Director
- Notable works: Mad magazine

Sam Viviano (born March 13, 1953, in Detroit, Michigan) is an American caricature artist and art director. Viviano's caricatures are known for their wide jaws, which Viviano has explained is a result of his incorporation of side views as well as front views into his distortions of the human face. He has also developed a reputation for his ability to do crowd scenes. Explaining his twice-yearly covers for Institutional Investor magazine, Viviano has said that his upper limit is sixty caricatures in nine days.

== Early life ==
Viviano grew up on Detroit's east side, and attended the University of Michigan at Ann Arbor, graduating summa cum laude with a Bachelor of Fine Arts degree.

== Career ==
In 1975, he drove up the East Coast to New York City, where he attempted to show art directors his portfolio, which consisted of various types of work he did in art school, including cartoons, abstract expressionist paintings, etc. When no assignments came his way, he took a job as a textile designer, while he pondered his lack of success in the illustration market. He soon came to the realization that, in order to compete in the field, he needed to choose a specialty, stating that what one sacrifices in width and breadth one gains in depth. He decided that he enjoyed doing caricature the most, and took out ads featuring his caricature work in trade directories such as Showcase and Black Book (against the advice of publishers who insisted that depictions of children and products would be more marketable). These advertisements yielded his first notable advertising illustration, a full-page ad in the New York Times for "On TV", a satellite service presenting the 1979 James Bond film Moonraker.

Cover to MAD #223 (June 1981), Viviano's first cover work

By this time, Viviano was already working for many titles published by Scholastic Magazines (most notably Dynamite and Bananas). Because of the nature and style of his illustration, he was encouraged by a number of colleagues to show his work to Mad Magazine. Although Viviano's samples were well-liked, he was told that there were no openings at that magazine, as it was a "closed shop" of about a dozen artists. However, in 1980, he was contacted by Mad Editor Al Feldstein, who told him that their usual cover artist (Norman Mingo) had died, and asked Viviano if he would provide one for the magazine. The cover, Viviano's first, was for Mad #223 (June 1981). Advertising Lou Silverstone and Mort Drucker's take-off Dullus, the cover of #223 depicted actor Larry Hagman in his role of J. R. Ewing from the television series Dallas being shot through the ear with an Alfred E. Neuman-emblazoned flag. Viviano has stated that he was so nervous about his first job for Mad that he made the illustration (with six-fingered hand) twice. The issue sold so poorly (eventually becoming the worst-selling issue of Mad up to that point in time) that Feldstein did not allow Viviano to contribute any further to Mad until his retirement four years later, at which point Viviano began regular contributions, including the movie parodies and mock advertisements that magazine is known for.

He has since done work for corporations and for the advertising industry. He has contributed to Rolling Stone, Family Weekly, Reader's Digest and Consumer Reports.

Viviano taught a caricature class at Manhattan’s School of Visual Arts from 1981 to 1992, where he expressed the viewpoint that the goal of caricature is to use exaggeration to express an inner truth about an individual. Among the students of his who went on to enjoy prominent careers as illustrators specializing in caricature is Hanoch Piven.

Viviano produced the first digital illustration for Mad Magazine. The illustration, a series of nine satirical road signs parodying aspects of rock concerts, accompanied an article written by Desmond Devlin titled "Mad’s International Signs for the Rock World”", which appeared in Mad #328 (June 1994).

In 1994, Mad editors Nick Meglin and John Ficarra invited Viviano to come on staff at the magazine, but he declined in order to focus on his freelance career. In late 1999, they again extended the invitation, this time for the position of the magazine's Art director, and Viviano, now the father of a four-year-old girl, accepted. He currently oversees a staff of three that designs, layouts, and produces the art that appears in Mad.

Viviano is listed in the most recent edition of The World Encyclopedia of Cartoons by Maurice Horn.

== Personal life ==
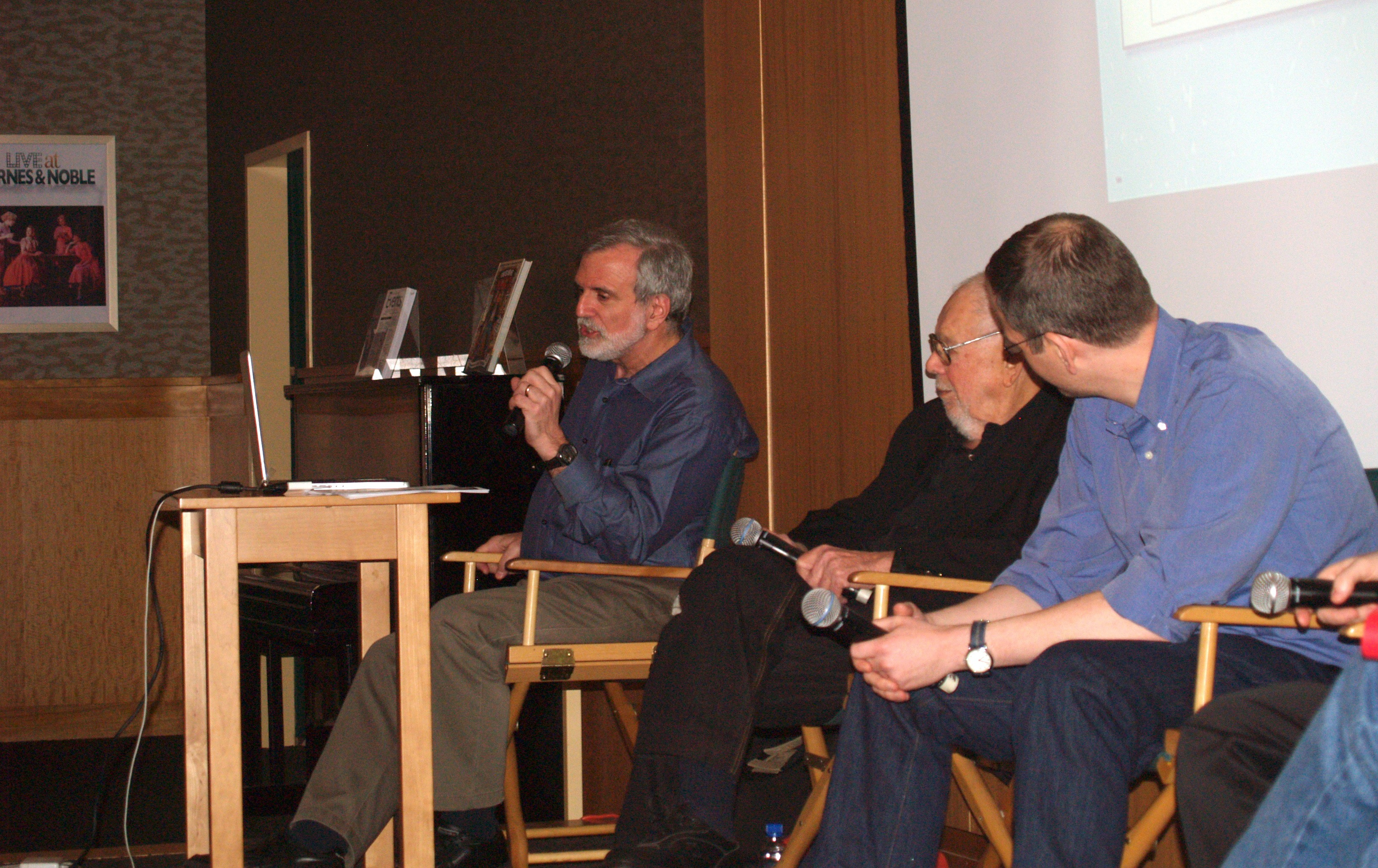
From left to right: Viviano, Al Jaffee and Tim Carvell at a signing for Inside Mad in 2013

Viviano is married to a New York physician, and is known to include his wife and daughter, as well as various other members of his family, in the backgrounds of scenes he illustrates. He is a cousin to New Testament scholar and author Benedict Viviano.
