= Major Publications =

Publisher founded in 1958

- Status: defunct (1994)
- Founded: 1958
- Founder: Robert C. Sproul
- Country of origin: United States of America
- Headquarters location: Long Island
- Key people: Sol Brodsky, John Severin, Terry Bisson
- Publication types: Comic magazines
- Fiction genres: Humor, Horror, Western, Adventure
- Imprints: Humor-Vision; Globe Communications

Major Publications, also known as Major Magazines, was the publisher of the satirical magazine Cracked, the most durable imitator of Mad magazine. Founded by Robert C. Sproul in 1958, the company generally imitated other publishers' successes in various genres, such as Westerns, men's adventure, and the Warren Publications mid-1960s revival of horror comics. Even as the company chased publishing trends, its long-running flagship title was Cracked, which the company published from 1958 to 1985.

The company also published a number of monster-themed magazines, imitating publications like Fangoria and Famous Monsters of Filmland. Editor Terry Bisson recalled:

The whole company was about lowball imitations. The publisher . . . wanted to put out some imitations of Western, romance and astrology mags, and I was hired (at about age 27) to put them together because of my romance mag experience. . . . The pseudomags did pretty well (this was a very low end market).

== History ==
=== Cracked ===
Cracked's first editor was Sol Brodsky. Over the years, Bill Ward and John Severin were regular contributors to most of the company's publications. The production manager throughout the 1960s was Charles Foster.

In addition to the flagship title, Major put out a number of publications under the Cracked umbrella, including Cracked Collector's Edition, Giant Cracked, and Super Cracked. Many Cracked contributors worked on these titles.

=== Web of Horror ===
The most notable of Major's black-and-white horror magazines was Web of Horror, edited by Bisson, which published three issues from 1969 to 1970. Bruce Jones made his professional debut in Web of Horror #3, writing and drawing the six-page story "Point of View." Wayne Howard contributed to issue #1. Syd Shores penciled "Blood Thirst!" in #1 and "Strangers!" in #3. Ralph Reese was a regular contributor to Web of Horror. Other contributors included Bernie Wrightson, Michael Kaluta, and Jeff Jones.

Bisson left after issue #3, leaving the editorial chores to Wrightson and Bruce Jones. As Wrightson recalls,

Major Magazines just literally packed up and left overnight. . . .Bruce and I put together the whole fourth issue, which had already been assigned. We were working at home! We had to take this incredibly long trip to get [to Major Magazines] — Bruce lived in Flushing at the time and from there we took a train to the end of the line and from there we had to take two buses and then walk about ten blocks to get to the office! It was an all-day thing and we finally get out to the office... and the place was empty. All the desks, all the filing cabinets, everything, was gone! . . . [W]e never learned where the guy went and what happened to him. We had all this stuff for the fourth issue and we were planning issues five and six — Bruce and I were going to take over the magazine and make it like Creepy or EC Comics — but they just left! . . . Whatever had been turned in already, they took with them. I don't think anybody got paid for anything — and Bruce and I took a bath on it.

=== Sale to Globe Communications ===
In 1985, founder Sproul sold the company's assets to Globe Communications, which moved the operations to Florida and continued to publish Cracked and some of its affiliated magazines under the Major Magazines name. Globe sold the assets to American Media in 1994.

== Titles published ==
- Cracked titles:
  - Cracked (212 issues, Feb./Mar. 1958–July 1985) — sold to Globe Communications
  - Biggest Greatest Cracked (21 issues, 1965–Fall 1986)
  - Cracked Collector's Edition (58 issues, 1973–February 1985)
  - Cracked Digest (5 issues, Oct. 1986–Oct. 1987)
  - Cracked Goes to the Movies (1 issue, 1971)
  - Cracked Shut-Ups 2 issues, 1971)
  - Extra Special Cracked (9 issues, 1976–Winter 1986)
  - Giant Cracked (48 issues, 1965–Winter 1989)
  - King-Sized Cracked (20 issues, 1967–Summer 1986)
  - Super Cracked (32 issues, 1968–Fall 1986)
- Monster Howls (1 issue, 1966) — Humor-Vision imprint
- Monsters Attack (5 issues, 1989–1990) — Globe Communications imprint
- Pow Magazine (3 issues, 1966–1967) — Humor-Vision imprint
- Web of Horror (3 issues, Dec. 1969–Apr. 1970)
