= Everything You Always Wanted to Know About Sex* (*But Were Afraid to Ask) (film) =

1972 film by Woody Allen

- Theatrical release poster
- Directed by: Woody Allen
- Screenplay by: Woody Allen
- Based on: Everything You Always Wanted to Know About Sex* (*But Were Afraid to Ask) by David Reuben
- Produced by: Charles H. Joffe
- Starring: Woody Allen; John Carradine; Lou Jacobi; Louise Lasser; Anthony Quayle; Tony Randall; Lynn Redgrave; Burt Reynolds; Gene Wilder
- Cinematography: David M. Walsh
- Edited by: Eric Albertson
- Music by: Mundell Lowe
- Production companies: Jack Rollins–Charles H. Joffe Productions; Brodsky/Gould Productions
- Distributed by: United Artists
- Release date: August 6, 1972
- Running time: 88 minutes
- Country: United States
- Languages: English; Italian
- Budget: $2 million
- Box office: $18 million

Everything You Always Wanted to Know About Sex* (*But Were Afraid to Ask) is a 1972 American sex comedy anthology film directed by Woody Allen. It consists of a series of short sequences loosely inspired by David Reuben's 1969 book of the same name.

The film was an early success for Woody Allen, grossing over $18 million in North America alone against a $2 million budget, making it the 10th highest-grossing film of 1972.

== Film structure ==
The credits at the start and close of the film are played over a backdrop of a large mass of white rabbits, to the tune of "Let's Misbehave" by Cole Porter.

The film consists of seven vignettes, as follows:

1. "Do Aphrodisiacs Work?"
  A court jester (Allen) gives a love potion to the Queen (Lynn Redgrave) but is foiled by her chastity belt. There are references to Shakespeare's Hamlet throughout.
2. "What Is Sodomy?"
  Dr. Ross (Gene Wilder) falls in love with the partner of an Armenian patient, a sheep.
3. "Why Do Some Women Have Trouble Reaching an Orgasm?"
  Allen's homage to Italian film-making in general and Casanova 70, Michelangelo Antonioni, and Federico Fellini in particular, about Gina (Louise Lasser), a woman who can only reach orgasm in public.
4. "Are Transvestites Homosexuals?"
  Sam Musgrave (Lou Jacobi), a middle-aged married man, experiments with women's clothes.
5. "What Are Sex Perverts?"
  A parody of the television game show What's My Line? called What's My Perversion?, filmed in B&W kinescope-style and hosted by Jack Barry. The four panelists who attempt to guess the contestant's perversion are Regis Philbin, Robert Q. Lewis, Pamela Mason, and Toni Holt. After they fail to guess that the contestant's perversion is "Likes to expose himself on subways," a second segment of the show is presented, in which a selected viewer (in this case a rabbi) gets to act out his bondage and humiliation fantasy while his wife eats pork.
6. "Are the Findings of Doctors and Clinics Who Do Sexual Research and Experiments Accurate?"
  Victor (Allen), a sex researcher, and Helen Lacey (Heather MacRae), a journalist, visit a Dr. Bernardo (John Carradine), a researcher who formerly worked with Masters and Johnson but now has his own laboratory complete with a lab assistant named Igor. After they see a series of bizarre sexual experiments underway at the lab and realize that Bernardo is insane, they escape before Helen becomes the subject of another of his experiments. The segment culminates with a scene in which the countryside is terrorized by a giant runaway breast created by the researcher. The first part of this segment is a parody of Ed Wood's Bride of the Monster (1955), and especially, The Unearthly (1957), which also stars Carradine. The second part parodies many of the "Giant" monster movies of the 1950s.
7. "What Happens During Ejaculation?"
  The NASA-like mission control center in a man's brain is seen, as he gets involved in a sexual clinch with an NYU graduate (knowledge that she is a graduate of NYU assures coital success). As he achieves orgasm, the soldier-like, white-uniformed sperm are dispatched paratrooper-style into the great unknown.

== Cast ==
- Woody Allen as Victor / Fabrizio / The Fool / Sperm
- John Carradine as Dr. Bernardo
- Lou Jacobi as Sam Musgrave
- Louise Lasser as Gina
- Anthony Quayle as The King
- Tony Randall as The Operator
- Lynn Redgrave as The Queen
- Burt Reynolds as Sperm Switchboard Chief
- Gene Wilder as Dr. Ross
- Jack Barry as Himself
- Elaine Giftos as Mrs. Ross
- Toni Holt as Herself
- Robert Q. Lewis as Himself
- Heather MacRae as Helen Lacey
- Pamela Mason as Herself
- Sidney Miller as George
- Regis Philbin as Himself
- Titos Vandis as Stavros Milos
- Stanley Adams as Stomach Operator
- Oscar Beregi as Brain Control
- Alan Caillou The Fool's Father
- Don Chuy as Football Player
- Dort Clark as Sheriff
- Erin Fleming as The Girl
- Geoffrey Holder as Sorcerer
- Baruch Lumet as The Rabbi
- Tom Mack as Football Player
- Jay Robinson as The Priest
- Ref Sanchez as Igor
- Robert Walden as Sperm
- Norman Alden as Switchboard

== Soundtrack ==
- "Let's Misbehave" (1927) - Music and Lyrics by Cole Porter - Played by Irving Aaronson and his Commanders
- "Battle Hymn of the Republic" (circa 1856) - Music by William Steffe - Lyrics by Julia Ward Howe
- "Red River Valley" (1896) - Music by James Kerrigen - Played on harmonica by Woody Allen

== Critical response ==
On the review aggregator website Rotten Tomatoes, 88% of 25 critics' reviews are positive, with an average rating of 7.3/10. Metacritic, which uses a weighted average, assigned the film a score of 66 out of 100, based on 5 critics, indicating "generally favorable" reviews.

An August 1972 review by Time said that many of the film's ideas "sound good on paper" but that the "skits wind down rather than take off from the ideas"; the film includes "some broad, funny send-ups of other movies (Fantastic Voyage, La notte), and its fair share of memorably wacky lines" but that "overall it is just Woody marking time and being merely a little funnier".

The Time Out Film Guide noted that some of the film's sketches are "dross, but the parodies of Antonioni (all angst and alienation of a wife who can achieve orgasm only in public places) and of TV panel games ('What's My Perversion?') are brilliantly accurate and very funny. Best of all is the sci-fi parody entitled What Happens During Ejaculation?"

In 2004, Christopher Null, founder of filmcritic.com, called it a "minor classic and Woody Allen's most absurd film ever".

== Censorship ==
The film was banned in Ireland on March 20, 1973. A cut version was passed in 1979 and released theatrically in 1980, removing both a bestiality reference ("the greatest lay I ever had", referring to a sheep) and a man having sex with a loaf of rye bread. The ban on the uncut version was eventually lifted.

== See also ==
- List of American films of 1972
