= David Reuben (author) =

Celebrity author of books about sex and nutrition

David Reuben M.D.
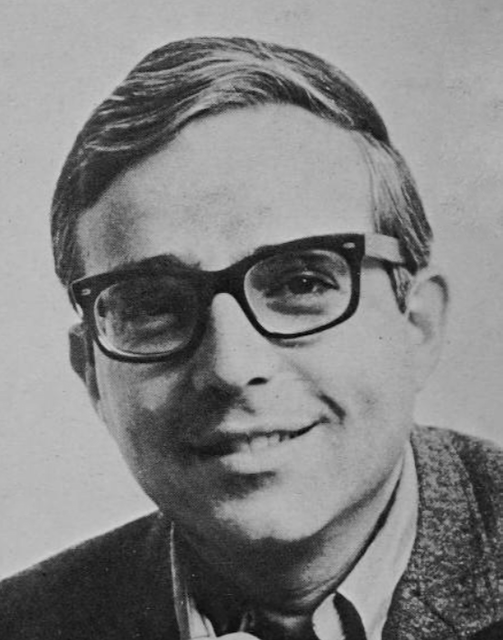
- Reuben in 1970
- Born: David Rubin; November 29, 1933 (age 92); Chicago, Illinois, USA
- Education: University of Chicago University of Illinois College of Medicine
- Occupations: Author; psychiatrist
- Spouse: Barbara Reuben
- Children: 5
- Writing career
- Period: 1969-2015
- Subjects: Sex; nutrition; mental health
- Notable works: Everything You Always Wanted to Know About Sex* (*But Were Afraid to Ask)

David Robert Reuben (born David Rubin November 29, 1933) is an American-born author and psychiatrist, known for his best-selling books Everything You Always Wanted to Know About Sex* (*But Were Afraid to Ask) and The Save-Your-Life Diet.

== Early life and education ==
Reuben was born in 1933 in Chicago. He entered the University of Chicago at the age of 15 and later transferred to the University of Illinois College of Medicine, where he earned his M.D. in 1957. He received psychiatric training at Cook County Hospital.

== Career ==
Reuben served as a medical officer in the United States Air Force from 1959 to 1961. Following his military service, Reuben established a private practice in Southern California. He also worked at Harvard Medical School and the Massachusetts Health Center.

During the early 1970s, Reuben became a celebrity doctor and appeared on television with multiple appearances on The Tonight Show and Dick Cavett Show. He shifted from medical practice to full‑time writing by the mid‑1970s.

== Works ==
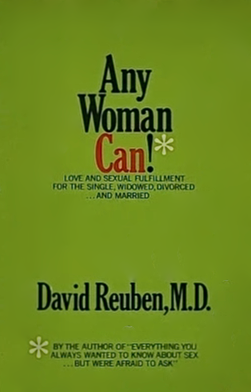
Any Woman Can!

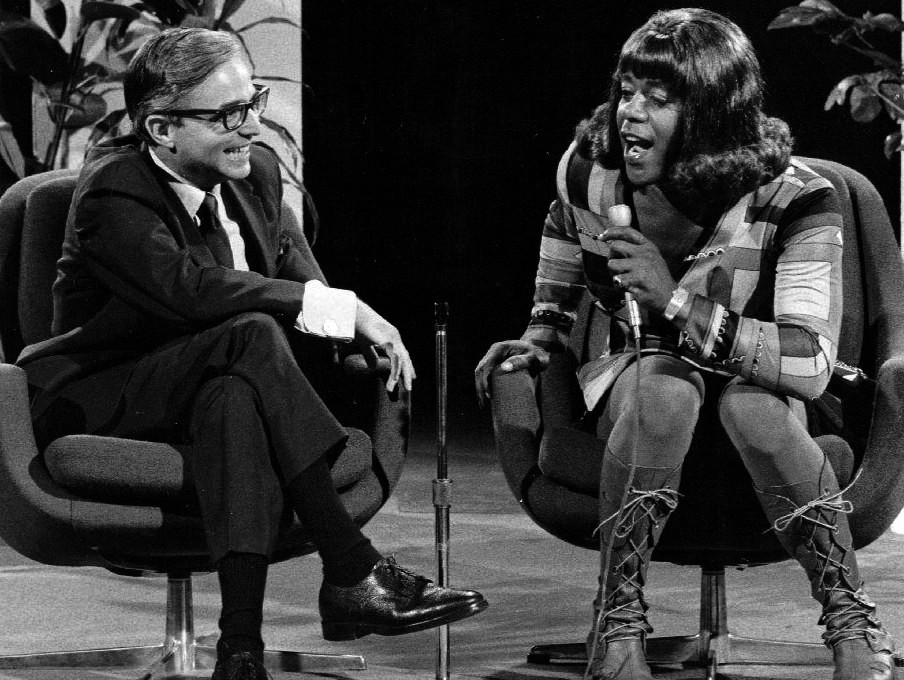
Reuben, being interviewed by Flip Wilson as Geraldine, on a 1971 episode of The Flip Wilson Show

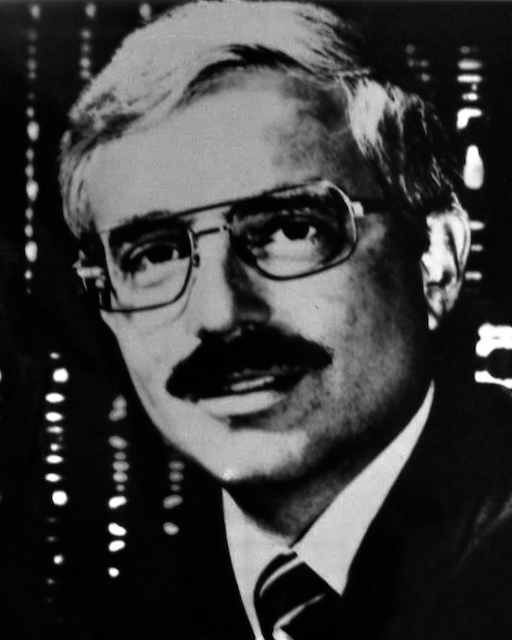
A 1975 publicity photo of Reuben for Everything You Always Wanted to Know About Nutrition

During his clinical practice, Reuben also worked with patients with sexual dysfunctions. He observed that patients frequently asked similar questions, which inspired him to create a straightforward resource to address these common concerns. This idea first took shape as an informational pamphlet, which he progressively developed into a full‑length manuscript. After facing rejections from multiple publishers, his book, Everything You Always Wanted to Know About Sex but Were Afraid to Ask, was published in 1969. The book gained popularity for its humorous and accessible question‑and‑answer format and was translated into more than 19 languages and sold more than 100 million copies. The book challenged societal taboos surrounding sexuality in a period characterized by limited public discourse and education about sex. Kirkus Reviews' critic judged the manual as "a useful and sensible book" whose "entertaining and slightly rakish approach" helps to demystify the subject. Praised for its witty, candid approach, it topped The New York Times bestseller list for 55 consecutive weeks. It was "among the top 20 all‑time best sellers of the 20th century in the United States". The book also inspired a film by Woody Allen, Everything You Always Wanted to Know About Sex (*But Were Afraid to Ask) (1972).

Reuben issued a major revision in 1999 to address changing laws on contraception and abortion, the HIV/AIDS epidemic and shifting social attitudes toward LGBT identities. Martin Miller, looking back on the updated 1999 edition for the Los Angeles Times, praised Reuben's "breezy, tongue‑in‑cheek Q‑and‑A form" while noting that fresh medical material on AIDS and abortion kept the book "still sex‑education's locomotive,"

Reuben authored two more best‑selling books on sex, Any Woman Can! (1971) and How to Get More out of Sex (1974).

The Save‑Your‑Life Diet: High‑Fiber Protection (1975) and The Save Your Life Diet High‑Fiber Cookbook (1976) translated his roughage manifesto into a kitchen playbook. Kirkus Reviews judged the book "perfectly okay" as a practical sequel. In 1978 Everything You Always Wanted To Know About Nutrition was published. In 1982, Dr. David Reuben's Mental First‑Aid Manual was published. Reviewer T. H. Woon found the manual "thought‑provoking" and potentially helpful to both doctors and laypeople.

== Personal life ==
Reuben is married to Barbara, and they have five children.
