= Everything You Always Wanted to Know About Sex* (*But Were Afraid to Ask) (book) =

Book by David Reuben

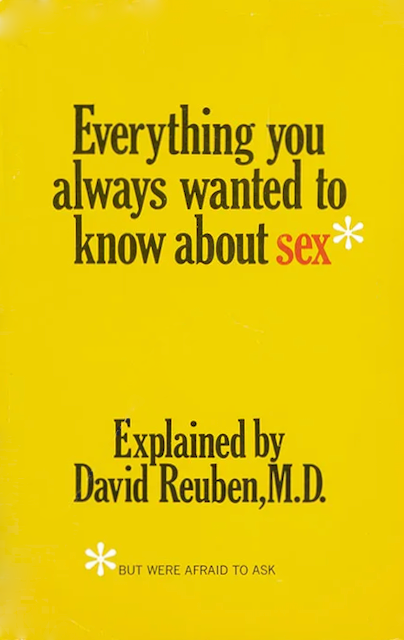
- Author: David Reuben
- Cover artist: Lawrence Ratzkin
- Language: English
- Subject: Sex
- Genre: Non-fiction
- Publisher: McKay
- Publication date: June 1969
- Publication place: United States
- Media type: Print
- Pages: 368 pp.
- ISBN: 0-06-019267-4
- OCLC: 30542
- Dewey Decimal: 306.7 21
- LC Class: HQ31 .R436 1999

Everything You Always Wanted to Know About Sex* (*But Were Afraid to Ask) is a book (1969, updated 1999) by psychiatrist David Reuben. It was the first sex manual to reach a large mainstream audience, and had a profound effect on sex education and in liberalizing attitudes towards sex. It was "among the top 20 all-time best sellers of the 20th century in the United States".

== History ==
The book was a Number 1 best-seller in 51 countries and reached more than 100 million readers. In 1972, it was parodied by Woody Allen in the comedy film of the same name and received a favorable response from movie critics.

The book had a significant impact. It was favorably reviewed by The New York Times and Life, and, after a massive book tour, would go on to be #1 on The New York Times bestseller list for 55 weeks. Reuben became a celebrity, guesting, a dozen times, on The Tonight Show with Johnny Carson.

As popular as the book was, it attracted critics in both the clinical world, and the public. The LGBT community objected to negative descriptions of homosexuality in the book (for example, Reuben wrote that gay men were "trying to solve the problem with only half the pieces"; lesbianism was relegated to a brief discussion in a section about prostitution). It was negatively reviewed, with "anti-Semitic overtones", by Gore Vidal, in The New York Review of Books, for its homophobia. In 1972, Playboy magazine published an article saying that there were about 100 errors in the book.

Reuben wrote an updated version ("he says he has altered 96 percent of his first edition") which was published 30 years later, in 1999 and 2000. In particular, his views on homosexuality, abortion, and pornography were updated. Andrew Tobias reviewed the book, in 1999, for The Advocate. It was reviewed by the Los Angeles Times, The Baltimore Sun, the Chicago Tribune, and others.

== Cultural influence ==
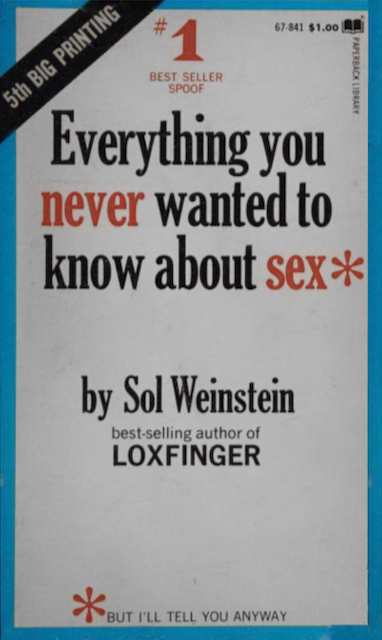
A 1971 parody by Sol Weinstein

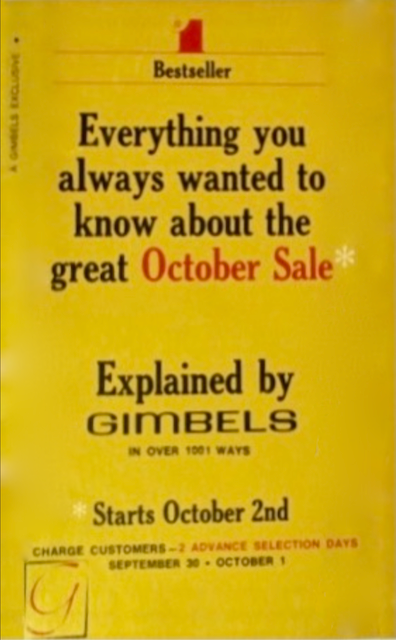
A Gimbels advertising booklet modeled after the book

Its curiosity-arousing title and its question-and-answer format has inspired hundreds of similarly titled and formatted research papers.

Reuben appeared with Jack Benny in a 1971 NBC comedy special, Everything You Always Wanted to Know About Jack Benny, But Were Afraid to Ask.

== Publication information ==
- Reuben, David R. (1969). Everything You Always Wanted to Know About Sex, but Were Afraid to Ask. New York: Bantam Books. ISBN 978-0-553-23167-0.
