= Joe Raiola =

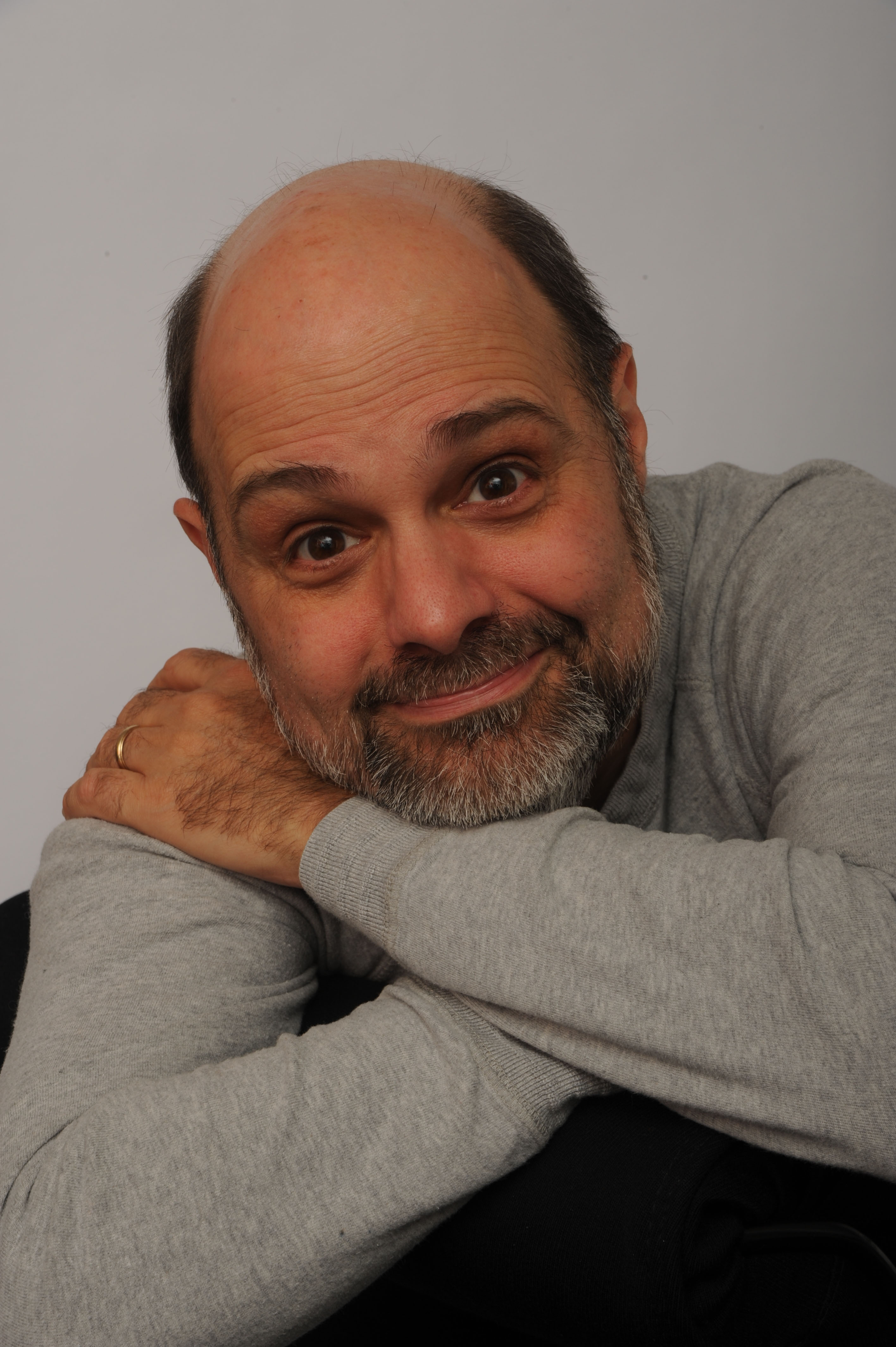
- Born: October 12, 1955 (age 70); Brooklyn, New York, U.S.
- Occupations: Satirist, comedy writer, producer, speaker on first amendment issues.
- Known for: Senior editor, MAD magazine, Annual John Lennon Tribute, Theatre Within
- Website: joeraiola.com

Joe Raiola (born October 12, 1955) is an American satirist, comedy writer and producer. He is known for his work in Mad magazine, for which he was a member of the editorial staff and a frequent contributor for 33 years, through the end of 2017 when he retired as senior editor.

He is also known for the Annual John Lennon Tribute in New York City, of which he is the cocreator and executive producer, and for his solo show, The Joy of Censorship. He is currently the president and artistic director of Theatre Within.

== Early life ==
Born in Brooklyn, Raiola grew up on Staten Island where he attended Tottenville High School. He was awarded a scholarship to Adelphi University based on his work in the school drama class. After graduating from Adelphi in 1977, he worked as a New York City taxi driver.

== MAD career ==
Raiola's work first appeared in MAD #254/April 1985. He is credited on over 100 MAD features, frequently sharing a byline with fellow editor Charlie Kadau. "MAD is the only place in America where if you mature, you get fired,” Raiola said. As a member of the editorial staff, he appeared in the magazine's masthead for 295 issues, through MAD #550/February 2018.

== Annual John Lennon Tribute ==
In 1981, Raiola and Alec Rubin created Theatre Within's Annual John Lennon Tribute in New York City, which is currently the only ongoing John Lennon tribute concert in the world sanctioned by Yoko Ono. Upon hearing of the Tribute for the first time in 2004, Ms. Ono invited Raiola to contribute to her book, Memories of John Lennon. Raiola has produced and appeared in the Tribute for 37 consecutive years.

Beginning as a neighborhood workshop production on Manhattan's Upper West Side, the tribute evolved over time into a professional charity concert featuring well-known artists. Since 2009, performers have included Patti Smith, Donovan, Debbie Harry, Judy Collins, Ben E. King, Raul Malo, Jackson Browne, Taj Mahal, Joan Osborne, Cyndi Lauper, David Bromberg, and Bettye LaVette.

Proceeds from the tribute support Theatre Within's workshops in songwriting, meditation and art at Gilda's Club, NYC, for those whose lives have been impacted by cancer. In a December 2017 interview on NY1, Raiola said, "John [Lennon] was not just a great artist and rockstar, he was an activist who had an important message, and part of that message was just giving a damn."

== Performing career ==
Since 1994, Raiola has toured in The Joy of Censorship, his outspoken and satiric first amendment program. In March 2002, his performance at Nassau Community College was broadcast on C-SPAN's American Perspectives. Raiola has performed the show in 44 states, at colleges, conferences, regional theaters and libraries, most notably at the Henry Miller Memorial Library and the Kurt Vonnegut Memorial Library.

In 2015, Raiola appeared with legendary humor magazine editors, Tony Hendra and Bob Mankoff, in Stand Up for Charlie Hebdo, a benefit for the families of the victims of the Charlie Hebdo attack.

In 2002, Raiola's Almost Obscene was a hit at the New York International Fringe Festival, where the New York Times called it "a ruefully amusing lament for the ineradicable hypocrisy of humanity." In July 2006, Raiola unveiled an updated version of the show, which he also performed as part of the Woodstock Fringe, where the Woodstock Times called it "unflinchingly honest and thought provoking."

== Radio ==
From 2001 to 2016, Raiola was a co-host of the Woodstock Roundtable on Radio Woodstock, 100.1 WDST .

== Run for Pope ==
On February 14, 2013, following the resignation of Pope Benedict XVI, Raiola announced his candidacy for Pope. Along with Stephen Colbert, Richard Simmons, Jim Caviezel and Tom Araya, he was chosen by TruTV as one of "5 Unconventional Catholics That Could Become The New Pope." Ultimately, Pope Francis was elected; due to the traditional secrecy of the voting process, the only certainty is that Raiola finished no higher than second in the balloting.
