= Charlie Kadau =

American writer

- Born: 1956 (age 69–70)
- Known for: Senior Editor, MAD magazine

Charlie Kadau, is an American comedy writer and editor. Along with his writing partner, Joe Raiola, Kadau has been a member of the editorial staff of Mad magazine since 1985 and currently holds the title of Senior Editor.

== Early life ==
Born in 1956, Kadau grew up in Staten Island, NY, graduating from Tottenville High School in 1974. He attended Hofstra University from 1974 through 1978, graduating with a degree in communications.

== Writing career ==
After graduating from Hofstra University in the late 1970s, Kadau found his niche in 1985 when he his long-time writing partner, Joe Raiola sold their first article to Mad Magazine, "The Mad "Don't" Book - Chapter 1: What Not to Do at a Funeral". Shortly after, the two became members of "the Usual Gang of Idiots", eventually rising to their current positions of Senior Editors. To date, Kadau (along with Joe) has appeared on the masthead of the magazine over 250, a total surpassed by only 5 other people.

Kadau, writing for the magazine as a team with Raiola and separately, has been responsible for over 130 articles and covers. Among his best known MAD pieces is The Belching Dragon, (written with Raiola) a parody of a Chinese take-out menu. The targets of his comedic wit have included the NRA, Indiana Jones, cigarette warning labels, Gary Hart, "The Simpsons", Madonna, and "Star Wars".
