= Lou Silverstone =

American satirist

Louis Donald Silverstone (May 17, 1924 – March 9, 2015) was a comedy writer who was one of "The Usual Gang of Idiots" at MAD Magazine from 1962 to 1990.

At MAD, he was primarily, though by no means exclusively, a writer of television and movie parodies. His first-ever contribution was "Bananaz," a parody of Bonanza. It was not until 1968 that he began contributing other kinds of articles, many of which were otherwise related to television and movies. In all, Silverstone had more than 180 bylines for Mad. This included conceiving the idea for "Madde," a 24-page insert purporting to be a typical issue of Mad if it had been published in the year 1776. The insert was published during the summer of the Bicentennial and three of its ten articles were written by "scrivener" Silverstone: "Thou Knowest Thou Art in Troubled Waters When...", "The Madde Revolutionary War Primer," and "Ye Madde Hate Book." In 1983 he created "The Book of Mad," which purported to be excerpts from a Mad issue of Biblical times.

Silverstone also wrote for television shows including Candid Camera and the animated Jackson Five cartoon. Following his association at MAD, Silverstone moved to its competitor Cracked, where he served several years as an editor and writer.

Silverstone grew up in Plainfield, New Jersey, where he graduated from Plainfield High School, and attended the University of Illinois. He worked as an accountant for several years before becoming a comedy writer "through sheer determination and relentless persistence." He was married for 61 years.
