= History of Mad =

Debuting in August 1952 (cover-dated October–November), Mad began as a comic book, part of the EC line published from offices on Lafayette Street in Lower Manhattan. In 1961 Mad moved its offices to mid-town Manhattan, and from 1996 onwards it was located at 1700 Broadway until 2018 when it moved to Los Angeles, California to coincide with a new editor and a reboot to issue #1.

In the planning stages the new publication was referred to as "EC's Mad Mag" ("The title was my suggestion," Al Feldstein once said) but was shorted by Kurtzman to just "Mad."

The phrase "Tales Calculated to Drive You" above the title Mad referenced radio's Suspense which often used the opening, "Tales well calculated to keep you in… Suspense!" With wordplay on "jocular," the vertical subtitle, "Humor in a Jugular Vein," hinted at a sinister satirical edge.

== Early artists ==
Written almost entirely by Harvey Kurtzman, the first issue also featured illustrations by Kurtzman himself, along with Wally Wood, Will Elder, Jack Davis and John Severin. Wood, Elder and Davis were the three main illustrators throughout the 23-issue run of the book; Severin, a mainstay of Kurtzman's EC war comics, left the comic book by the tenth issue. Kurtzman included his own finished art only sporadically, primarily on covers. However, he was known as an exceedingly "hands-on" editor and a visual master, and thus many Mad articles were illustrated in strict accordance with Kurtzman's detailed layouts. A handful of other artists also contributed to the original run, including Bernard Krigstein, Russ Heath and most conspicuously among the non-regulars, Basil Wolverton.

The first two issues of Mad spoofed only comic books and movie genres of romance, horror, sports and science fiction, without overtly specific references. However, with issue #3, Kurtzman turned to direct parodies, targeting two well-known radio programs with parodies of Dragnet and The Lone Ranger, and he soon began satirizing selected comic strips ("Little Orphan Melvin!"), comic books ("Superduperman!"), books ("Alice in Wonderland!"), films ("Hah! Noon!") and television programs ("Howdy Dooit!").

== Expansion and evolution ==
By mid-1953, William Gaines had made plans for expansion. After nine bi-monthly issues, Mad became a monthly with the April 1954 issue. At that same time, EC Comics launched another satirical bi-monthly, Panic, edited by Al Feldstein. Since this new title also used Kurtzman's core trio of artists (Davis, Elder, Wood), the peeved editor felt that Panic sapped and diminished the creative energy necessary to meet Mad's production schedule.

In 1955, with issue 24, the comic book converted to a magazine format. According to popular myth, this was done to escape the strictures of the Comics Code Authority, which was imposed in 1955 following U.S. Senate hearings on juvenile delinquency. Actually, Kurtzman had received a lucrative offer from another publisher, and only stayed when Gaines agreed to upgrade Mad.

In a 1983 interview with The Comics Journal, Gaines remembered:

"Harvey had come to me and said, “How would you like to turn Mad into a slick magazine?” And I said I wouldn't like to turn Mad into a slick magazine, I'm a comic publisher, I don't know anything about slick magazines, it's a whole different ballgame and I'm not interested… And that was the end of it for six, eight, 10 months, until he was offered this job with Pageant… as I recall, he was going to begin with a section of the book to do all by himself and also a good chunk of money, which was more than he was making with me. And I countered this by recalling that he had wanted to make Mad a slick. And I said, “Harvey, if you stay, I’ll let you make Mad a slick.
And Harvey stayed, made Mad a slick, and didn't even take as much money as he would have gotten at Pageant, because Harvey was never money-crazy. He could spend it like a maniac [laughter], but for himself, he was never demanding in that sense. So that's how that happened.” In a 1992 interview, Gaines related that Mad "was not changed [into a magazine] to avoid the Code" but "as a result of this [change of format] it did avoid the Code."

In a 2016 interview with Gilbert Gottfried on his podcast, Al Jaffee remembered it slightly differently, stating that the original comic primarily focused on spoofing newspaper comics. By adopting the broader magazine format, they could lampoon and parody a wide variety of topics.

The immediate practical result was that Mad acquired a broader range in both subject matter and presentation. Magazines had wider distribution than comic books, and a more adult readership.

However, the Comics Code Authority had proven fatal to most of Gaines's EC Comics line due to restrictions on title and content. Gaines suffered both financially and creatively from targeted industry censorship and the enmity of his fellow publishers. EC's national distributor, Leader News Co, was the nation's weakest and did not have the clout to withstand an undeclared industry boycott of EC product: the company's comics were frequently returned still in their original unopened bundles. These factors combined to drive all EC Comics from the stands, except for Mad, which was too profitable to ignore. The company's financial status grew shakier in 1956 when Leader News Co. declared bankruptcy, leaving EC over $100,000 in debt. Only the Gaines family's investment of capital and a fortuitous deal with the much stronger American News distributor kept Mad afloat.

== Al Feldstein's team ==
After the bulk of EC's line was canceled in 1954–1955, the company was completely reliant on the improving fortunes of Mad. In a creative showdown, Kurtzman insisted on a 51 percent share in the company or else he would quit. When Gaines rejected the demand, EC was without its dominant creative force, and Kurtzman was separated from the magazine that crystallized his talents. Al Feldstein returned to EC and oversaw Mad during its greatest heights of circulation. Taking over with issue #29 (September 1956), Feldstein set to work assembling a phalanx of humor writers and cartoonists. His first issue as editor coincided with the debut of Don Martin: crucial longtime contributors such as prolific writer Frank Jacobs and star caricaturist Mort Drucker quickly followed. Before the classic Mad staff was assembled, Feldstein also relied on celebrity guest contributions to attract attention and fill pages. Some of these pieces, attributed to Bob and Ray, were actually the work of their main writer Tom Koch, who would flourish in Mad for decades under his own byline. By the early 1960s, working with art director John Putnam and such notables as Antonio Prohias, Al Jaffee and Dave Berg well in hand, Feldstein had fully established the format that was to be a commercial success for decades.

The Mad logo has remained largely unchanged since 1955, save for the decision to italicize the lettering beginning in 1997. For many years, the mysterious letters "IND" appeared in small type within the logo, between the M and the A. Sometimes the Mad logo included characters in humorous situations or cavorting centaurs within the lettering, one of whom would be pointing directly at the IND. Though some fans speculated about the secret meaning of the "M-IND" message, the truth was more prosaic: from 1957 on, the magazine was handled by Independent News Distribution.

== Circulation peak ==
Al Feldstein joined Mad in the same year that Time described it as a "short-lived satirical pulp". By the time he left 28 years later, the magazine was commonly cited as one of the three greatest publishing successes of the 1950s, along with Playboy and TV Guide. The magazine's circulation more than quadrupled during Feldstein's tenure, peaking at 2,132,655 in 1974, although it had declined to a third of this figure by the end of his time as editor. The highest-selling individual issue was #161 (September 1973), which sold over 2.4 million copies. Sales for the April 1974 issue depressed because of its cover illustrating a hand giving "the finger" gesture. Several newsstands refused to put the issue on stands and Mad offices had extra copies as a result.

For tax reasons, Gaines sold his company in the early 1960s to the Kinney Parking Company. Kinney was in the process of becoming a conglomerate, including acquiring National Periodicals (a.k.a. DC Comics) and Warner Bros. by the end of that decade. Though technically an employee for 30 years, the fiercely independent Gaines was named a Kinney board member, and was largely permitted to run Mad as he saw fit without corporate interference.

By early 1978, Mad was obliged to include a UPC symbol on its covers. The magazine responded by devoting the entire front cover of issue #198 to a giant UPC bar code, saying they hoped it would "jam every computer in the country" for "forcing us to deface our covers with this yecchy UPC symbol from now on." For more than two years, subsequent issues labeled the normal-sized symbol with a series of humorous captions, such as "Closeup of the gap in Alfred E. Neuman's teeth" or "Hair of man watching horror movie."

When Feldstein retired in 1984, he was replaced by the team of Nick Meglin and John Ficarra, who co-edited Mad for the next two decades. After Meglin retired in 2004, Ficarra continued to edit the magazine through 2017. In conjunction with the magazine's offices moving to Burbank, Bill Morrison assumed the editorship in 2018.

== Later history ==
=== 1990s–2000s ===
Following Gaines's June 3, 1992 death, Mad became more ingrained within the Time Warner corporate structure, which did not share Gaines's idiosyncratic ideas about marketing Mad. Time Warner turned the magazine over to DC Comics's publishers Jenette Kahn and Paul Levitz, and DC Vice President Joe Orlando became the magazine's new associate publisher. Closely involved with DC licensing, Orlando had also been a staff artist with EC Comics in the 1950s, and a prolific contributor to Mad during the 1960s. Time Warner put a much stronger emphasis on Mad merchandising and licensing, including products for its chain of Warner Studio Stores. Orlando's Special Projects department at DC Comics hired Bhob Stewart to edit a new Mad Style Guide (1994), featuring artwork by Sergio Aragonés, Angelo Torres and George Woodbridge.

Eventually, the magazine was obliged to abandon its longtime home at 485 Madison Avenue (printed as "MADison" Avenue in the masthead), and in the mid-1990s it moved into DC Comics's offices at the same time DC relocated to 1700 Broadway. Although Orlando retired from DC Comics in 1996, he continued to design cover layouts for Mad right up until the month of his death in 1998.

=== 2000s–2019 ===
In 2001, the magazine broke its longstanding taboo and began running advertising. The outside revenue allowed for the introduction of color printing and improved paper stock. Some black-and-white material, however, remains in each issue.

In April 2009, with issue #500, Mad contracted from a monthly schedule to a quarterly circulation. Mad editor John Ficarra joked that the move was in response to letters complaining that only every third issue is funny, "so we've decided to just publish those." The cover price was raised to $5.99.

In March 2010, Mad became a bimonthly magazine, coinciding with Paul Levitz stepping down as president of DC Comics.

Issue #533, dated June 2015, featured Mad's only guest editor to date, "Weird Al" Yankovic.

In August 2015, the cover of Hillary and Bill Clinton, a parody of Mad Max: Fury Road, was praised highly by The Huffington Post, Sun Times and many other media.

Issue #550, dated April 2018, was the final issue of the first volume of the magazine which launched at EC Comics in 1952. MAD Magazine was rebooted with a new #1 dated June 2018 and a new look. After 30+ years editor John Ficarra retired, with illustrator and comic book artist Bill Morrison becoming the new editor and the magazine shifted offices to Los Angeles after decades in Manhattan (first on Madison Avenue and then on Broadway).

=== 2019–present: Exit from Newsstand ===
On July 4, 2019, it was reported that following issue #10 (October 2019) of the Mad revival, future regular issues would no longer contain solely new content, but will rather contain mostly recycled content from the previous 67 years of publication, in addition to a small portion of new content. In addition, Mad would no longer be sold on newsstands, and was instead available for purchase in comic book shops as well as through subscriptions.
