= Bob Clarke (illustrator) =

American illustrator (1926–2013)

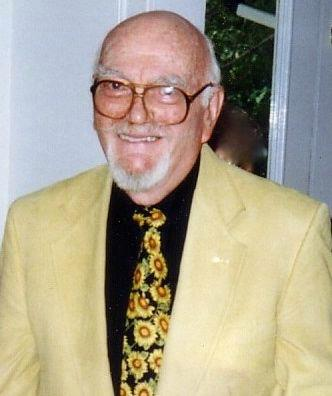
- Bob Clarke
- Born: Robert J. Clarke; January 25, 1926 Mamaroneck, New York
- Died: March 31, 2013 (aged 87) Seaford, Delaware
- Area: Cartoonist
- Notable works: Mad magazine contributor Cutty Sark label

Robert J. "Bob" Clarke (January 25, 1926 – March 31, 2013) was an American illustrator whose work appeared in advertisements and MAD Magazine. The label of the Cutty Sark bottle is his creation. Clarke was born in Mamaroneck, New York. He resided in Seaford, Delaware.

Clarke's style in MAD was distinctive, showing a mastery of line and an eye for the humorous side of things. "I was known as the "thing" artist", said Clarke. "Whether it was a telephone or a slot machine or whatever, I would draw the things". MAD editor Al Feldstein called Clarke "a singular valuable asset to MAD ... his arrival upon the scene was a godsend". Feldstein's successor John Ficarra said of Clarke, "He was a great designer, and he also was a terrific mimic of other people’s styles... And if there was a problem you could give it to Bob, and he could usually solve it for you".

Clarke's earliest professional job was at the age of 17, as an uncredited assistant on the "Ripley's Believe It or Not!" comic strip. Ripley traveled the world collecting his fantastic trivia tidbits and sent them back to Clarke who drew them, captioned them and circulated them among the vast number of magazines and newspapers who carried the strip. Years later, he illustrated MAD's occasional "Believe It or Nuts!" parody. After two years with Ripley, Clarke joined the army, where he worked for the European edition of Stars and Stripes and met his wife. Clarke remained with Stars and Stripes after being discharged as a civilian contributor, before eventually returning to America and joining the advertising firm Geyer, Newell, and Ganger. That job would prepare Clarke well for his MAD work: "I learned about typefaces and layouts, how to prepare comps in the styles of many artists and cartoonists". Clarke was among the GNG artists who designed the box for the children's game Candyland.

Clarke was one of the artists who took up the slack after original editor Harvey Kurtzman left MAD, taking two of its three primary artists (Will Elder and Jack Davis) with him. In his first year at MAD, Clarke illustrated 24 separate articles; he would eventually draw more than 600. Clarke was a mainstay of the magazine as it rose in circulation, being one of four general-purpose artists who took MAD through the late 1950s and earliest 1960s, the others being Wallace Wood, George Woodbridge and Joe Orlando (Jack Rickard's work appeared in mid-1961, while Don Martin, Mort Drucker and Dave Berg produced more specialized topics or features).

Of the Wood-Orlando-Woodbridge-Clarke quartet, Bob Clarke had the most cartoon-like style. This was exploited by the two circus panoramas that ran in MAD #41; the first depicted an old-time circus done by Wallace Wood, a breathtakingly elaborate vision of impossible spectacle. The circus drawn by Clarke was simple and uncluttered, showing small routine acts. The point of the article was the decline of the circus, and the artistic contrast sold the premise.

But the versatile Clarke was also able to provide intricate detail. In a 1999 interview, he remembered one challenging MAD assignment:

"Tom [Koch] had this thing that was supposed to be a calendar or something. In this little one-inch space he wanted everything crammed into this tiny little space. He had a stagecoach, robberies, a bank, and explosions going off in this tiny little spot and I put every single thing in there. [Art Director] John Putnam really appreciated that".

Like many of Mad's contributors, Clarke occasionally appeared in the humorous photos that appeared in the magazine. His most revealing pose was for a 1989 MAD Special for which he'd been assigned to create an actual pair of men's boxer shorts with a repeating pattern of Alfred E. Neuman's face. Clarke impishly arrived at Mad's offices while wearing the underpants, and from there, it took little convincing to get him to model them on the cover of the Special.

Of Clarke's 600+ MAD articles, his favorite was "A MAD Look at the Joys of Scuba Diving", a collaborative 1966 piece that came together with writers Dick DeBartolo and Al Jaffee during a staff trip to San Juan. "We wrote it underwater", recalled Clarke.

He died of pneumonia on March 31, 2013.
