= Paul Peter Porges =

American cartoonist

Paul Peter Porges (February 7, 1927, Vienna – December 20, 2016, Kingston, Jamaica) was an American cartoonist whose work appeared in many places, including The New Yorker, Mad magazine, Playboy, Harper's, Look and the Saturday Evening Post.

== Early life ==
Paul Peter Porges was born in Vienna in 1927 and was raised in the district of Fünfhaus. His father had a grocery store in Moeringgasse. Following Nazi Germany's invasion of Austria, his parents sent him and his older brother Kurt to the Château de la Guette de Germaine de Rothschild, a children's camp near Paris, in March 1939. In 1940–41 he wandered through the French countryside alone at the age of 13 to avoid capture by the Nazis. Sixty-seven years later, Porges remembered, "It was fantastic! But don't tell anyone!"

Porges was ultimately captured and interned in a deportation camp. He escaped by hiding in a garbage collection, and was smuggled to Switzerland along with other juvenile refugees in 1942. The Swiss authorities discovered them and sent all but Porges back to France; he was spared because he was the only one younger than sixteen. He remained there for the rest of the war, attending art school (today: fr:Haute École d'art et de design Genève), receiving his certificat d'etude, and meeting his future wife, Lucie Eisenstab. The two had been born months apart in the same hospital back in Vienna.

== Immigration to the United States ==
Porges's brother Kurt had managed to reach England, and eventually joined the U.S. Army. After the war, he obtained a visa for Paul to come to America. He also got visas for their parents, both of whom had been sent to a concentration camp but survived.

Porges's wedding to Eisenstab was delayed by a stint in the army during the Korean War. While in uniform, Porges drew cartoons for army newspapers, including a recurring strip in Stars and Stripes. After being discharged, he began to establish himself as a gag cartoonist for magazines.

== Work at Mad magazine ==
After a few sales, he became a regular contributor to Mad magazine in 1971. His first contribution to Mad was the cover idea for issue #106, in 1966. Over the next four decades he contributed over 200 articles to Mad. Porges was primarily a writer for the first seven years, but Mad began using his artwork more regularly in 1978; between 1986 and 1993, he appeared in 52 consecutive issues. His last feature appeared in Mad #500.

Though he used different illustrative styles in his career, he is perhaps best known for an energetic line combined with monochrome wash.

Following his death, Mad editor John Ficarra wrote a remembrance that included the admiring words "It takes a special kind of twisted mind to imagine what it was like to play shuffleboard on Columbus' ship, the Santa Maria (MAD #223) or dream up "Other Uses for Live Lobsters."

== Exhibitions and archive ==
In 2000 the Jewish Museum Vienna presented a double personal exhibition named Style and Humor, which attracted 64,000 visitors.

In 2001 this exhibition was shown in New York. The opening planned for September 11 was canceled because of the attack on the World Trade Center on that day. In 2007 the museum invited to a fashion show by Lucie Porges.

The pullover that Porges wore from 1939 to 1945 became part of the permanent exhibition in 2013; the family donated the Vienna family archive and major works by Lucie and Paul Peter Porges to the Jewish Museum Vienna in 2015.

== Personal life, family and death ==
Porges's wife Lucie Porges studied fashion in the United States and became a fashion designer for the New York label Pauline Trigère. She died in 2011. PPP, as family and friends called him, went into seclusion. He died on December 20, 2016. He was survived by two daughters, Vivette and Claudia.
