= Ficarra (disambiguation) =

Ficarra may refer to:

== People ==
- Glenn Ficarra (born 1969), American writer, producer, actor and director
- John Ficarra (born ca. 1956), American publishing figure
- Marie Ficarra (born 1954), Australian politician

== Other ==
- Ficarra, comune (municipality) in Sicily
- Ficarra e Picone, Italian comedy duo, composed by Salvatore Ficarra and Valentino Picone
