= Potrzebie =

Polish word used as a joke by Mad magazine

In Bernard Krigstein's "From Eternity Back to Here!" (Mad 12) the word "Potrzebie" made an early Mad appearance, flying over Burt Lancaster and Deborah Kerr, and a caricature of Jacques Tati in Mr. Hulot's Holiday. The issue is dated June 1954, the same month the 1953 Tati film had a U.S. release.

Potrzebie (/pɒtrəˈziːbi/; Polish pronunciation: [pɔtˈʂɛbʲɛ], the dative/locative case form of the noun potrzeba, 'need') is a Polish word popularized by its non sequitur use as a running gag in the early issues of Mad not long after the comic book began in 1952.

== Origin ==
Mad editor Harvey Kurtzman spotted the word printed in the Polish language section of a multi-languaged "Instructions for Use" sheet accompanying a bottle of aspirin. Kurtzman, who was fascinated with words he found unusual, decided it would make an appropriate but meaningless background gag. After cutting the word out of the instruction sheet, he made copies and used rubber cement to paste "Potrzebie" randomly into the middle of Mad satires.

== Appearances ==
Potrzebie was first used in a story in Mad #11 (May 1954), where it was the exclamation of a character who spoke only in foreign languages and song lyrics, in "Murder the Story", a parody illustrated by Jack Davis. It was used again in Bernard Krigstein's "From Eternity Back to Here!" in Mad #12 (June 1954) on an airplane advertising banner. With the same type font, it reappeared in Jack Davis's "Book! Movie!" in Mad #13 (July 1954), pasted into a panel as the title of an abstract painting seen in the background. In the same issue the word appears as POTS-REBIE, emblazoned on a cauldron in which Robinson Crusoe is roasting a frankfurter. This piece reappeared in one of the earliest Mad paperbacks, Bedside Mad It was illustrated as a rebus in "Puzzle Pages!" in Mad #19 (January 1955). These stories, like others in Mad comics, were written by Harvey Kurtzman. Frequent repetition gave it the status of a catch phrase or in-joke among the readership which continues to the present day. In the first Mad Style Guide, edited by Bhob Stewart in 1994, the word was made available for display on T-shirts and other licensed Mad products. It also sees occasional use as a metasyntactic variable by hackers.

Fourth appearance of the word in Jack Davis's "Book! Movie!" (Mad #13)

A typical appearance of the word is exemplified by the Mad version of Chaucer's Canterbury Tales (from Mad #43, December 1958), which begins:

"Whon thot Aprille swithin potrzebie,
"The burgid prillie gives one heebie-jeebie.

== System of measurement ==
In issue 33, Mad published a partial table of the "Potrzebie System of Weights and Measures", developed by 19-year-old Donald E. Knuth, later a famed computer scientist. According to Knuth, the basis of this new revolutionary system is the potrzebie, which equals the thickness of Mad issue 26, or 2.2633484517438173216473 mm, although the eighth digit was mistakenly dropped and the thickness appeared as 2.263348517438173216473 mm in the MAD article. A standardization in terms of the wavelength of the red line of the emission spectrum of cadmium is also given, which if the 1927 definition of the Ångstrom is taken for the value of that wavelength, would equal 2.263347539605392 mm.

Volume was measured in ngogn (equal to 1000 cubic potrzebies), mass in blintz (equal to the mass of 1 ngogn of halavah, which is "a form of pie [with] a specific gravity of 3.1416 and a specific heat of .31416"), and time in seven named units (decimal powers of the average Earth rotation, equal to 1 "clarke"). The system also features such units as whatmeworry, cowznofski, vreeble, hoo and hah.

According to the "Date" system in Knuth's article, which substitutes a 10-clarke "mingo" for a month and a 100-clarke "cowznofski", for a year, the date of October 29, 2007, was originally rendered as "Cal 7, 201 C.M." (for Cowznofsko Madi, or "in the Cowznofski of MAD"). The dates are calculated from October 1, 1952, the date MAD was first published. Dates before this point are referred to, tongue-in-cheek, as "B.M." ("Before MAD.") Later Knuth preferred 0-origin indexing, so October 29, 2007 is now rendered as "Cal 6, 201 C.D." (for Cowznofsko Dimentii, with "mad" also translated into Latin). The ten "Mingoes" are: Tales (Tal.) Calculated (Cal.) To (To) Drive (Dri.) You (You) Humor (Hum.) In (In) A (A) Jugular (Jug.) Vein (Vei.)

Google Calculator and WolframAlpha can both perform conversions from the potrzebie system to other units. WolframAlpha uses the originally printed value of a potrzebie, while Google Calculator appears to use a value rounded to 5 significant figures. As such, the two sites may not compute identical results.

== See also ==
Wiktionary: furshlugginer
