= Mad Fold-in =

Hidden meaning feature for image and text

Unfolded

Folded

Fold-in of Mad magazine issue 125, March 1969.

The Mad Fold-In is a feature of the American humor and satire magazine Mad. Written and drawn by Al Jaffee until 2020, and by Johnny Sampson thereafter, the Fold-In is one of the most well-known aspects of the magazine, having appeared in nearly every issue of the magazine starting in 1964. The feature was conceived in response to centerfolds in popular magazines, particularly Playboy.

Explaining his original inspiration, Jaffee said:

Playboy had a foldout of a beautiful woman in each issue, and Life Magazine had these large, striking foldouts in which they'd show how the earth began or the solar system or something on that order -- some massive panorama. Many magazines were hopping on the bandwagon, offering similar full-color spreads to their readers. I noticed this and thought, what's a good satirical comment on the trend? Then I figured, why not reverse it? If other magazines are doing these big, full-color foldouts, well, cheap old Mad should go completely the opposite way and do an ultra-modest black-and-white Fold-In!

In 2011, Jaffee reflected, "The thing that I got a kick out of was... Jeopardy! showed a fold-in and the contestants all came up with the word they were looking for, which was 'fold-in.' So I realized, I created an English language word."

The Fold-In is among the few recurring features remaining in Mad today, as the magazine switched to a nearly all-reprint format in 2019.

== Concept ==
A Mad Fold-In consists of a single drawing, a paragraph of text underneath, and a panel across the top with a question. Each Fold-In also features instructions on how to manipulate the Fold-In, as well as a picture illustrating the procedure. Under the instructions are two arrows labeled "A" and "B." When the paper is folded so that points "A" and "B" touch, the remaining unobscured text underneath the picture becomes the answer to the question, and the picture itself changes into a fresh image reflecting the new text, as the middle 50% of the drawing vanishes.

For example, a 1969 Fold-In asking, "What is the one thing protest marches have greatly improved?" depicted a stream of placard-carrying marchers, but folded into the image of the underside of a worn-out sole and the answer, "SHOE SALES." A drawing of a fearsome panther stalking a variety of jungle animals accompanying the question "What predatory creature most threatens the survival of endangered species?" contracted to the image of a lavishly swaddled woman and the solution "FUR LOVERS." (In the larger drawing, the two halves of her fur coat were the foliage of trees.) Following the 1991 Tailhook scandal, a Navy war room became a female officer being sexually molested by a gauntlet of her comrades.

The Far Side creator Gary Larson described his experience with the Fold-In: "The dilemma was always this: Very slowly and carefully fold the back cover... without creasing the page and quickly look at the joke. Jaffee's artistry before the folding was so amazing that I suspect I was not alone in not wanting to deface it in any way."

Mad publisher Bill Gaines joked that he was a fan of the Fold-In because he knew that serious collectors valued pristine, unfolded copies, and would therefore be inspired to purchase two copies of each issue: one to fold and another to preserve intact.

In 1972, Jaffee received a Special Features Reuben Award for his Fold-Ins. A retrospective collection of his Fold-Ins, "Fold This Book!", was published in 1997. A four-volume hardcover set, The Mad Fold-In Collection: 1964-2010, was released in September 2011.

== Execution ==
Typically, a Fold-In used visual trickery to match the ostensible topic. Jaffee said, "I could do ten of these a day if the big picture didn't have any connection with the answer. The tricky part is having a connection. In order for the copy to read correctly after it's folded, there has to be a marriage of some sort." Jaffee occasionally added an extra layer of deception. His Fold-In design for issue #495, for a question about "packaging garbage," prominently showed two separate halves of the Pixar character Wall-E within a larger drawing of a junkyard. But both Wall-E halves were on the wrong side of the fold, and thus disappeared into the real picture, which was about the TMZ gossip website.

Jaffee only used a computer for typographic maneuvers, to make certain fold-in tricks easier to design. Otherwise, all of his work was done by hand. "I'm working on a hard, flat board... I cannot fold it. That's why my planning has to be so correct." In 2008, Jaffee told the Cape Cod Times, "I never see the finished painting folded until it's printed in the magazine. I guess I have that kind of visual mind where I can see the two sides without actually putting them together." Contrasting current art techniques and Jaffee's approach, MAD's art director, Sam Viviano, said, "I think part of the brilliance of the fold-in is lost on the younger generations who are so used to Photoshop and being able to do stuff like that on a computer."

In 2016, AARP the Magazine did a feature on the eight Mad contributors who'd been with the magazine for 50 or more years. Editor John Ficarra described the process: "We'll call him up with a Fold-In idea and we'll say, 'In the first picture, we want the Civil War, and we have to have both the Confederate and Union soldiers in it, and there's got to be a cannon in it. And then when you fold it in, it has to be Kim Kardashian on Rodeo Drive, and she has to have a dog in her hand. Good luck!"

== History ==
Jaffee's first three Fold-Ins featured gags about the Elizabeth Taylor–Eddie Fisher–Richard Burton love triangle, Barry Goldwater and Nelson Rockefeller's battle for the 1964 Republican presidential nomination, and The Beatles' departure back to England. Fold-In subjects from the mid-1970s dealt with the gas shortage, "Saturday night special" handguns, and revelations about the CIA bugging American citizens. Fold-In topics in the years 2008 and 2009 included Guitar Hero, teen pregnancy, and Jay Leno temporarily leaving The Tonight Show. "Before anyone knew it," wrote comics historian Christopher Irving, "the hundreds of Fold-Ins created a timeline of American history, political satire, and entertainment."

The third Fold-In, in issue #88, had an unusual diagonally-folded layout which was never repeated. The first 33 Fold-Ins were printed in black-and-white; starting with Mad #119 (June 1968), all Fold-Ins have been presented in color.

In a Mad-like wrinkle, there are two answers to the question "When was Jaffee's last Fold-in?" The final one he designed appeared in the June 2019 issue. But his last Fold-in to be published, a personal farewell to readers, appeared in the August 2020 issue. Jaffee had prepared it six years in advance, to be published after his own death. Instead, it ran after he officially announced his retirement at the age of 99, as the conclusion of an "All Jaffee" tribute issue. It was the 509th issue of Mad to include new Jaffee material, the most for any contributor.

In 2010, Jaffee described the earliest Fold-Ins:

I thought to myself... now it's folded in and I've got to have something on the left side here, and something right side here. And the only thing that popped into my head was that Elizabeth Taylor had just dumped Eddie Fisher and was carrying on with Richard Burton. So I had Elizabeth Taylor kissing Richard Burton, and a cop is holding the crowd back — and just for the fun of it I put Eddie Fisher being trampled by the crowd. What a cruel thing to do! And then, when you fold it in, she's moving on from Richard Burton and kissing the next guy in the crowd. It's so simplistic and silly and juvenile! And anyone could have done that!

I showed it to Al Feldstein, and the first thing I said was, 'Al, I've got this crazy idea, and you're not going to buy it, because it mutilates the magazine.' So I put it in front of him, and the thing about Al was, he liked things that intrigued him. The mechanics of it intrigued him. He said, 'You mean, you fold it, like this . . . ? And then . . . ?' He folded it, he unfolded it, he folded it, and then he said, 'I like this!' But I said, 'Al, it mutilates the magazine.' And he said, 'Well, I'll have to check it with Bill.' He takes it, runs it to Bill's office, and he was there a little while, and he comes back and he says, 'We're going to do it! You know what Bill said? Bill said, "So they mutilate the magazine, and then they'll buy another one to save!'

Four or five weeks later, Al comes over to me and says, 'When are you going to do the next fold-in?' And I said, 'I don't have another fold-in. That was it!' So he said, 'Come on, you can come up with something else.' I wracked my brain, and the only thing I could come up with was Nixon [whose face was hidden within curtain folds]. That one really set the tone for what the cleverness of the fold-ins has to be. It couldn't just be bringing someone from the left to kiss someone on the right.

From its debut in 1964, the Fold-In has rarely been absent from Mad's pages. Since issue #86, seven issues (#121, #190, #212, #219, #261, #353 and #360) did not feature Fold-Ins, although Jaffee still wrote and drew four of those issues' back covers. (#219 featured a see-through effect in which the back cover and inside back cover could be held up to a light source, with the separate elements of the two images combining to reveal a visual punchline.)

Mad Super Special #19 (Fall 1976) featured a bonus insert, "Madde," an American Revolution-era Mad in honor of the U.S. Bicentennial. The insert included a Fold-In, showing a trade ship about to embark on a voyage, which folded into an African-American arm in chains.

Four Fold-Ins were patterned after Al Jaffee's other Mad feature, Snappy Answers to Stupid Questions. The first, in #222, shows Humpty Dumpty sarcastically refusing to be put back together again, which folds into a plate of scrambled eggs. The second, in #233, takes place in a fairytale setting where a frog refuses to have a princess kiss him, folding into an image where the princess walks off saying "I hope you freeze your ..." and a donkey is in the frog's place. The third, in #295, shows a wife confronting her husband over his cigarette smoking, folding into the wife mourning the husband at his funeral. The fourth, in #499, shows a snowboarder fending off stupid questions, folding into an image of him crashing into a stone wall.

In 2013, a completed Jaffee Fold-In about mass shootings was pulled from issue #521 when the editors realized the issue's on-sale date would coincide with the beginning of Aurora theater shooter James Holmes' court trial, which had been delayed. This turned out to be untrue, as the trial was delayed until October 2014, some 18 months after the editorial decision to nix the Fold-In was made. The run of Mad covers, which had already been printed separately, was destroyed, and a repeat Fold-In from 1992 was used as a replacement. #521 thus became just the second issue of Mad since 1964 not to include new work by Jaffee. One copy was inadvertently sent out to a subscriber as a replacement copy, who scanned and uploaded the Fold-In. Jaffee missed three issues in 2019 due to illness; the mass shooting Fold-In that was yanked from issue #521 was finally published in 2019 in Mad Volume 2 issue #7, a reprint from 1972 was published in issue #8 and a reprint from 1967 was published in issue #9.

On occasion, the feature has been moved from its usual spot. Issue #320 (July 1993) featured a Fold-in as the front cover. And in the annual "20 Worst of the Year" issue, the Fold-In is used as one of the 20 items, thus appearing as an internal page of the magazine. Only two Mad 20 issues, #389 and #11, have had a Fold-In as part of the Mad 20 and a second one as the inside back cover. In issue #11 (February 2020) the Fold-In appearing in the Mad 20 was created by artist Johnny Sampson, making him the first artist to create a Fold-In other than Jaffee. The feature is currently being produced by Sampson.

In 1999, Jaffee told an interviewer, "Usually you can go on working unless you have a stroke or something. So I hope to continue. I'm trying to decide whether I should do my final Fold-In before I die or after I die! [...] I don't want to share it! It's a secret! But I mentioned it to the editors at Mad and they said, "You mean you want to get paid ahead of time!"

Nevertheless, Jaffee's final Fold-In appeared in the August 2020 issue of Mad after the cartoonist retired at the age of 99. Appearing during a stark recession, it depicted the magazine's mascot Alfred E. Neuman with an atypically worried expression, in front of a dozen shuttered businesses. The question, "Why is the 'What, Me Worry?' kid so worried?" was answered when the stores' signage folded into the message "NO MORE JAFFEE FOLD-INS." A serene self-caricature appeared as a cloud.

Further Fold-ins are written and drawn by writer-artist Johnny Sampson.

== Outside cultural references ==
A 1996 episode of The Simpsons showed Bart Simpson and his friend Milhouse poring over a Mad Fold-In with the question "What higher power do TV evangelists worship?” above a drawing of green mountains. Labelled “The All-Majestic Inspirational Mighty Dolomite Mtns Are a Singular Example of God’s Glory”, the peaks fold in to form a dollar sign, with the answer reading “The All-Mighty Dollar”. Later in the episode, Bart’s father Homer Simpson misfolds the page, reads “The All Ighty Ollar,” and laughs anyway. In a 1993 episode, Marge Simpson’s prison cellmate has a Fold-In tattooed onto her back; when she pushes her shoulder blades together, the question “What kind of slime would I marry?”, becomes "What, me worry?" and reveals the face of Mad mascot Alfred E. Neuman. A 2002 episode of Futurama features a pseudo-Fold-In. A graffitied building depicting the character Bender is demolished, and Bender wails as his image collapses into a set of buttocks and the boast “Bender Lives Large and Kicks Butt!” becomes “Bender Licks Butt!”.

On January 24, 2010, the New York Times published a specially-constructed "Fold-In" crossword. The fully completed puzzle could be folded in the Jaffee style to reveal six further solutions, each of which was something that could itself be folded (e.g. LAWN CHAIR, NEWSPAPER, POKER HAND and ORIGAMI). Also mimicking Mad's design, the top and bottom rows of the crossword both featured an "A" and a "B" in their horizontal grids, which needed to be folded together to touch one another to produce the desired result.

Beck's 2005 video for "Girl" features a number of fold-ins, ranging from paper fold-ins to elaborate collapsible sets, including a foldable sidewalk and a foldable pharmacy. One of the video's Fold-Ins reveals the name "Al Jaffee".

In 2006, Stephen Colbert saluted Jaffee's 85th birthday on an episode of The Colbert Report with a large "fold-in" birthday cake, bearing the message

AL, |                          |
 YOU|  HAVE  REPEATEDLY SHOWN  |
   A|RTISTRY        &        CA|RE
   O|F GREAT CREDIT TO YOUR FIE|LD

But after the center slice was removed, and the remainder pushed together, it spelled out the message

AL, |
 YOU|
   A|RE
   O|LD.[20]

That was not Jaffee's first interaction with Colbert. In 2010, he recalled:

I got a call from The Daily Show — they asked me if I would contribute a fold-in to their [2004] book, America. I said I'd be happy to do it. When I was done, I called up the producer who'd contacted me, and I said, 'I've finished the fold-in, where shall I send it?' And he said — and this was a great compliment — 'Oh, please Mr. Jaffee, could you deliver it in person? The whole crew wants to meet you.' And that's where I met Stephen Colbert and Jon Stewart and all the writers, and they told me it was our work in Mad that inspired them. Not me, particularly, but us, generally. They're your age [referring to the interviewer], and they said, 'Without you guys, we wouldn't be here.' And I felt really good about that.
