= Mad (magazine) =

American humor magazine

- Cover of the August 2017 issue
- Former editors: Harvey Kurtzman (1952–1956); Al Feldstein (1956–1985); Nick Meglin (1984–2004); John Ficarra (1984–2018); Bill Morrison (2018–2019)
- Categories: Satire, humor
- Frequency: Bimonthly
- Circulation: 140,000 (as of 2017)
- First issue: October/November, 1952; 74 years ago (original magazine); June 2018; 8 years ago (reboot)
- Final issue: April 2018; 8 years ago (original magazine)
- Company: EC Comics (1952–2018); DC Comics (2018–present)
- Country: United States
- Language: English
- Website: dc.com/mad
- ISSN: 0024-9319
- OCLC: 265037357

Mad (stylized in all caps) is an American humor magazine that was launched in 1952 and currently published by DC Comics. Mad was founded by editor Harvey Kurtzman and publisher William Gaines, launched as a comic book series before it became a magazine. It was widely imitated and influential, affecting satirical media, as well as the cultural landscape of the late 20th century, with editor Al Feldstein increasing readership to more than two million during its 1973–1974 circulation peak. It is the last surviving title in the EC Comics line, which sold Mad to Premier Industries in 1961, but closed in 1956.

Mad publishes satire on all aspects of life and popular culture, politics, entertainment, and public figures. Its format includes TV and movie parodies, and satire articles about everyday occurrences that are changed to seem humorous. Mad's mascot, Alfred E. Neuman, is usually on the cover, with his face replacing that of a celebrity or character who is being lampooned. From 1952 to 2018, Mad published 550 regular magazine issues, as well as scores of reprint "Specials", original-material paperbacks, reprint compilation books and other print projects. After AT&T merged with DC's then-owner Time Warner in June 2018, Mad ended newsstand distribution, continuing in comic-book stores and via subscription.

== History ==
Cover for Mad No. 1

Issue 24 July 1955. The "extremely important message" was, "Please buy this magazine!".

Mad began as a comic book published by EC, debuting in August 1952 (cover date October–November). The Mad office was initially located in lower Manhattan at 225 Lafayette Street, while in the early 1960s it moved to 485 Madison Avenue, the location listed in the magazine as "485 MADison Avenue".

The first issue was written almost entirely by Harvey Kurtzman, and featured illustrations by him, Wally Wood, Will Elder (Also known as Bill Elder), Jack Davis, and John Severin. Wood, Elder, and Davis were to be the three main illustrators throughout the 23-issue run of the comic book.

To retain Kurtzman as its editor, the comic book converted to magazine format as of issue No. 24, in 1955. The switchover induced Kurtzman to remain for one more year, but the move had removed Mad from the strictures of the Comics Code Authority. William Gaines related in 1992 that Mad "was not changed [into a magazine] to avoid the Code" but "as a result of this [change of format] it did avoid the Code." Gaines claimed that Kurtzman had at the time received "a very lucrative offer from Pageant magazine," and seeing as he, Kurtzman, "had, prior to that time, evinced an interest in changing Mad into a magazine," Gaines, "not know[ing] anything about publishing magazines," countered that offer by allowing Kurtzman to make the change. Gaines further stated that "if Harvey [Kurtzman] had not gotten that offer from Pageant, Mad probably would not have changed format."

After Kurtzman's departure in 1956, new editor Al Feldstein swiftly brought aboard contributors such as Don Martin, Frank Jacobs, and Mort Drucker, and later Antonio Prohías, Dave Berg, and Sergio Aragonés. The magazine's circulation more than quadrupled during Feldstein's tenure, peaking at 2,132,655 in 1974; it later declined to a third of this figure by the end of his time as editor.

In its earliest incarnation, new issues of the magazine appeared erratically, between four and nine times a year. By the end of 1958, Mad had settled on an unusual eight-times-a-year schedule, which lasted almost four decades. Issues would go on sale 7 to 9 weeks before the start of the month listed on the cover. Gaines felt the atypical timing was necessary to maintain the magazine's level of quality. Beginning in 1994, Mad then began incrementally producing additional issues per year, until it reached a monthly schedule with issue No. 353 (Jan. 1997). With its 500th issue (June 2009), amid company-wide cutbacks at Time Warner, the magazine temporarily regressed to a quarterly publication before settling to six issues per year in 2010.

Gaines sold his company in 1961 to Premier Industries, a maker of venetian blinds. Around 1964, Premier sold Mad to Independent News, a division of National Periodical Publications, the publisher of DC Comics. In the summer of 1967, Kinney National Company purchased National Periodical Publications. Kinney bought Warner Bros.-Seven Arts in early 1969. As a result of the car parking scandal, Kinney Services spun off of its non-entertainment assets to form National Kinney Corporation in August 1971, and it reincorporated as Warner Communications, Inc. on February 10, 1972. In 1977, National Periodical Publications was renamed DC Comics.

Feldstein retired in 1985, and was replaced by the senior team of Nick Meglin and John Ficarra, who co-edited Mad for the next two decades. Long-time production artist Lenny "The Beard" Brenner was promoted to art director and Joe Raiola and Charlie Kadau joined the staff as junior editors. Following Gaines's death in 1992, Mad became more ingrained within the Time Warner (now WarnerMedia) corporate structure. Eventually, the magazine was obliged to abandon its long-time home at 485 Madison Avenue and in the mid-1990s it moved into DC Comics's offices at the same time that DC relocated to 1700 Broadway. In issue No. 404 of April 2001, the magazine broke its long-standing taboo and began running paid advertising. The outside revenue allowed the introduction of color printing and improved paper stock. After Meglin retired in 2004, the team of Ficarra (as executive editor) Raiola and Kadau (as senior editors), and Sam Viviano, who had taken over as art director in 1999, would helm Mad for the next 14 years.

Throughout the years, Mad has remained a unique mix of adolescent silliness and political humor. In November 2017, Rolling Stone wrote that "operating under the cover of barf jokes, Mad has become America's best political satire magazine." Nevertheless, Mad ended its 65-year run in New York City at the end of 2017 with issue No. 550 (cover-dated April 2018), in preparation for the relocation of its offices to DC Entertainment's headquarters in Burbank, California. Bill Morrison was named in June 2017 to succeed Ficarra in January 2018. None of Mad's New York staff made the move, resulting in a change in editorial leadership, tone, and art direction. More than a hundred new names made their Mad debuts including Brian Posehn, Maria Bamford, Ian Boothby, Luke McGarry, Akilah Hughes, and future Pulitzer Prize finalist Pia Guerra. Scores of artists and writers from the New York run also returned to the pages of the California-based issues including contributors Sergio Aragonés, Al Jaffee, Desmond Devlin, Tom Richmond, Peter Kuper, Teresa Burns Parkhurst, Rick Tulka, Tom Bunk, Jeff Kruse, Ed Steckley, Arie Kaplan, writer and former Senior Editor Charlie Kadau, and artist and former Art Director Sam Viviano. The first California issue of Mad was renumbered as "#1." In 2019, the rebooted magazine earned two Eisner Award nominations—the first such nominations in Mad's history—for the Best Short Story and Best Humor Publication categories.

AT&T acquired Time Warner in June 2018. Morrison exited Mad by March 2019, during a time of layoffs and restructuring at DC Entertainment. After issue No. 11 (Feb. 2020) of the new Burbank edition, Mad began to consist mostly of curated reprints with new covers and fold-ins, although some new articles have been periodically featured, including parodies of The Batman ("The Bathroom") and Elon Musk's tenure at Twitter (in a Dr. Seuss parody called "Free Speeches on the Beaches"). Distribution to newsstands stopped, with the magazine initially becoming available only through comic-book shops and by subscription, although in 2022 distribution expanded to Barnes & Noble via a series of compilation issues dubbed The Treasure Trove of Trash. Since late 2024, Spy vs. Spy and "A Mad Look at..." have resumed, with the magazine producing roughly 25% new content per issue. For the 50th issue of the rebooted magazine (Aug. 2026), Mad reverted to its legacy numbering, marking it as issue No. 600.

== Influence ==
Though there are antecedents to Mad's style of humor in print, radio and film, Mad itself became a signature example. Throughout the 1950s, Mad featured groundbreaking parodies combining a sentimental fondness for the familiar staples of American culture—such as Archie and Superman—with a keen joy in exposing the fakery behind the image. Its approach was described by Dave Kehr in The New York Times: "Bob Elliott and Ray Goulding on the radio, Ernie Kovacs on television, Stan Freberg on records, Harvey Kurtzman in the early issues of Mad: all of those pioneering humorists and many others realized that the real world mattered less to people than the sea of sounds and images that the ever more powerful mass media were pumping into American lives." Bob and Ray, Kovacs and Freberg all became contributors to Mad.

In 1977, Tony Hiss and Jeff Lewis wrote in The New York Times about the then-25-year-old publication's initial effect:

The skeptical generation of kids it shaped in the 1950s is the same generation that, in the 1960s, opposed a war and didn't feel bad when the United States lost for the first time and in the 1970s helped turn out an Administration and didn't feel bad about that either ... It was magical, objective proof to kids that they weren't alone, that in New York City on Lafayette Street, if nowhere else, there were people who knew that there was something wrong, phony and funny about a world of bomb shelters, brinkmanship and toothpaste smiles. Mad's consciousness of itself, as trash, as comic book, as enemy of parents and teachers, even as money-making enterprise, thrilled kids. In 1955, such consciousness was possibly nowhere else to be found. In a Mad parody, comic-strip characters knew they were stuck in a strip. "Darnold Duck," for example, begins wondering why he has only three fingers and has to wear white gloves all the time. He ends up wanting to murder every other Disney character. G.I. Schmoe tries to win the sexy Asiatic Red Army broad by telling her, "O.K., baby! You're all mine! I gave you a chance to hit me witta gun butt ... But naturally, you have immediately fallen in love with me, since I am a big hero of this story."

Mad is often credited with filling a vital gap in political satire from the 1950s to 1970s, when Cold War paranoia and a general culture of censorship prevailed in the United States, especially in literature for teens. Activist Tom Hayden said, "My own radical journey began with Mad Magazine." The rise of such factors as cable television and the Internet has diminished the influence and impact of Mad, although it remains a widely distributed magazine. In a way, Mad's power has been undone by its own success: what was subversive in the 1950s and 1960s is now commonplace. However, its impact on three generations of humorists is incalculable, as can be seen in the frequent references to Mad on the animated series The Simpsons. The Simpsons producer Bill Oakley said, "The Simpsons has transplanted Mad magazine. Basically everyone who was young between 1955 and 1975 read Mad, and that's where your sense of humor came from. And we knew all these people, you know, Dave Berg and Don Martin—all heroes, and unfortunately, now all dead." In 2009, The New York Times wrote, "Mad once defined American satire; now it heckles from the margins as all of culture competes for trickster status." Longtime contributor Al Jaffee described the dilemma to an interviewer in 2010: "When Mad first came out, in 1952, it was the only game in town. Now, you've got graduates from Mad who are doing The Today Show or Stephen Colbert or Saturday Night Live. All of these people grew up on Mad. Now Mad has to top them. So Mad is almost in a competition with itself."

Mad's satiric net was cast wide. The magazine often featured parodies of ongoing American culture, including advertising campaigns, the nuclear family, the media, big business, education and publishing. In the 1960s and beyond, it satirized such burgeoning topics as the sexual revolution, hippies, the generation gap, psychoanalysis, gun politics, pollution, the Vietnam War and recreational drug use. The magazine took a generally negative tone towards counterculture drugs such as cannabis and LSD, but it also savaged mainstream drugs such as tobacco and alcohol. Mad always satirized Democrats as mercilessly as it did Republicans. In 2007, Al Feldstein recalled, "We even used to rake the hippies over the coals. They were protesting the Vietnam War, but we took aspects of their culture and had fun with it. Mad was wide open. Bill loved it, and he was a capitalist Republican. I loved it, and I was a liberal Democrat. That went for the writers, too; they all had their own political leanings, and everybody had a voice. But the voices were mostly critical. It was social commentary, after all." Mad also ran a good deal of less topical or contentious material on such varied subjects as fairy tales, nursery rhymes, greeting cards, sports, small talk, poetry, marriage, comic strips, awards shows, cars and many other areas of general interest.

In 2007, the Los Angeles Times' Robert Lloyd wrote, "All I really need to know I learned from Mad magazine", going on to assert:

Plenty of it went right over my head, of course, but that's part of what made it attractive and valuable. Things that go over your head can make you raise your head a little higher. The magazine instilled in me a habit of mind, a way of thinking about a world rife with false fronts, small print, deceptive ads, booby traps, treacherous language, double standards, half truths, subliminal pitches and product placements; it warned me that I was often merely the target of people who claimed to be my friend; it prompted me to mistrust authority, to read between the lines, to take nothing at face value, to see patterns in the often shoddy construction of movies and TV shows; and it got me to think critically in a way that few actual humans charged with my care ever bothered to.

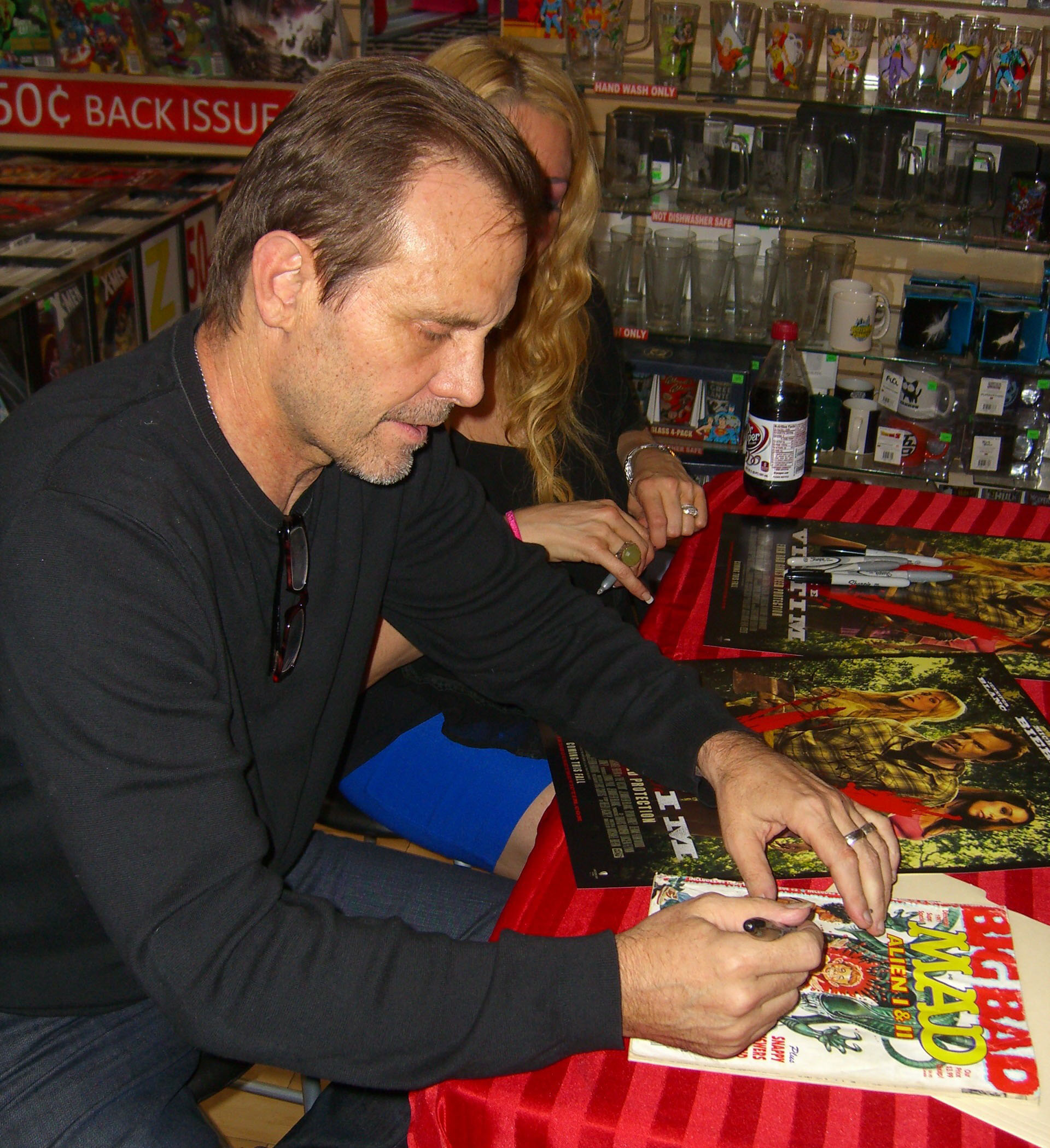
Actor Michael Biehn (pictured in 2012) autographing a copy of Mad No. 268 (Jan. 1987), which parodies Biehn's film Aliens

In 1988, Geoffrey O'Brien wrote about the impact Mad had upon the younger generation of the 1950s:

By now they knew the [nuclear survival] pamphlets lied ... Rod Serling knew a lot more than President Eisenhower. There were even jokes about the atom bomb in Mad, a gallows humor commenting on its own ghastliness: "The last example of this nauseating, busted-crutch type humor is to show an atom-bomb explosion! However, this routine, we feel, is giving way to the even more hilarious picture of the hydrogen bomb!" The jittery aftertaste of that joke clarified. It was a splinter driven through the carefully measured prose on the back of some Mentor book about Man and His Destiny ... By not fitting in, a joke momentarily interrupted the world. But after the joke you recognized it was a joke and went back to the integral world that the joke broke. But what if it never came back again, and the little gap stayed there and became everything?

In 1994, Brian Siano in The Humanist discussed the effect of Mad on that segment of people already disaffected from society:

For the smarter kids of two generations, Mad was a revelation: it was the first to tell us that the toys we were being sold were garbage, our teachers were phonies, our leaders were fools, our religious counselors were hypocrites, and even our parents were lying to us about damn near everything. An entire generation had William Gaines for a godfather: this same generation later went on to give us the sexual revolution, the environmental movement, the peace movement, greater freedom in artistic expression, and a host of other goodies. Coincidence? You be the judge.

Pulitzer Prize-winning art comics maven Art Spiegelman said, "The message Mad had in general is, 'The media is lying to you, and we are part of the media.' It was basically ... 'Think for yourselves, kids.'" William Gaines offered his own view: when asked to cite Mad's philosophy, his boisterous answer was, "We must never stop reminding the reader what little value they get for their money!"

Comics historian Tom Spurgeon picked Mad as the medium's top series of all time, writing, "At the height of its influence, Mad was The Simpsons, The Daily Show and The Onion combined." Graydon Carter chose it as the sixth-best magazine of any sort ever, describing Mad's mission as being "ever ready to pounce on the illogical, hypocritical, self-serious and ludicrous" before concluding, "Nowadays, it's part of the oxygen we breathe." Joyce Carol Oates called it "wonderfully inventive, irresistibly irreverent and intermittently ingenious".

Artist Dave Gibbons said, "When you think of the people who grew up in the '50s and '60s, the letters M-A-D were probably as influential as L-S-D, in that it kind of expanded people's consciousness and showed them an alternative view of society and consumer culture—mocked it, satirized it." Gibbons also noted that Mad was an overt influence on Watchmen, the acclaimed 12-issue comic book series created by writer Alan Moore and himself:

When it comes to the kind of storytelling we did in Watchmen, we used many of the tricks Harvey Kurtzman perfected in Mad. The thing for instance where you have a background that remains constant, and have characters walk around in front of it. Or the inverse of that, where you have characters in the same place and move the background around. We quite mercilessly stole the wonderful techniques Harvey Kurtzman had invented in Mad.

In a 1985 Tonight Show appearance, when Johnny Carson asked Michael J. Fox, "When did you really know you'd made it in show business?", Fox replied, "When Mort Drucker drew my head." In 2019, Terence Winter, writer and producer of The Sopranos, told Variety "When we got into Mad Magazine, that was the highlight for me. That said everything."

Monty Python's Terry Gilliam wrote, "Mad became the Bible for me and my whole generation." Underground cartoonist Bill Griffith said of his youth, "Mad was a life raft in a place like Levittown, where all around you were the things that Mad was skewering and making fun of."

Robert Crumb remarked, "Artists are always trying to equal the work that impressed them in their childhood and youth. I still feel extremely inadequate when I look at the old Mad comics."

When Weird Al Yankovic was asked whether Mad had had any influence in putting him on a road to a career in parody, the musician replied, "[It was] more like going off a cliff." Mystery Science Theater 3000 writer-actor Frank Conniff wrote, "Without Mad Magazine, MST3K would have been slightly different, like for instance, it wouldn't have existed." Comedian Jerry Seinfeld talked about the magazine's impact on him, saying, "You start reading it, and you're going, 'These people don't respect anything.' And that just exploded my head. It was like, you don't have to buy it. You can say 'This is stupid. This is stupid.'"

Critic Roger Ebert wrote:

I learned to be a movie critic by reading Mad magazine ... Mad's parodies made me aware of the machine inside the skin—of the way a movie might look original on the outside, while inside it was just recycling the same old dumb formulas. I did not read the magazine, I plundered it for clues to the universe. Pauline Kael lost it at the movies; I lost it at Mad magazine.

Rock singer Patti Smith said more succinctly, "After Mad, drugs were nothing."

== Recurring features ==
Mad is known for many regular and semi-regular recurring features in its pages, including "Spy vs. Spy", the "Mad Fold-in", "The Lighter Side of ..." and its television and movie parodies. The magazine has also included recurring gags and references, both visual (e.g. the Mad Zeppelin, or Arthur the potted plant) and linguistic (unusual words such as axolotl, furshlugginer, potrzebie and veeblefetzer).

=== Alfred E. Neuman ===
First cover appearance (issue 21, March 1955) of Alfred E. Neuman in a fake advertisement satirizing the popular mail-order house Johnson Smith Company

The image most closely associated with the magazine is that of Alfred E. Neuman, the boy with misaligned eyes, a missing-tooth smile, and the perennial motto "What, me worry?" The original image was a popular humorous graphic for many decades before Mad adopted it, but the face is now primarily associated with Mad.

Mad initially used the boy's face in November 1954. His first iconic full-cover appearance was as a write-in candidate for president on issue No. 30 (December 1956), in which he was identified by name and sported his "What, me worry?" motto. He has since appeared in a slew of guises and comic situations. According to Mad writer Frank Jacobs, a letter was once successfully delivered to the magazine through the U.S. mail bearing only Neuman's face, without any address or other identifying information.

== Legal disputes ==
The magazine has been involved in various legal actions over the decades, some of which have reached the United States Supreme Court. The most far-reaching was Irving Berlin et al. v. E.C. Publications, Inc. In 1961, a group of music publishers representing songwriters such as Irving Berlin, Richard Rodgers, and Cole Porter filed a $25 million lawsuit against Mad for copyright infringement following "Sing Along With Mad", a collection of parody lyrics which the magazine said could be "sung to the tune of" many popular songs. The publishing group hoped to establish a legal precedent that only a song's composers retained the right to parody that song. Judge Charles Metzner of the U.S. District Court for the Southern District of New York ruled largely in favor of Mad in 1963, affirming its right to print 23 of the 25 song parodies under dispute. However, in the case of two parodies, "Always" (sung to the tune of "Always") and "There's No Business Like No Business" (sung to the tune of "There's No Business Like Show Business"), Judge Metzner decided that the issue of copyright infringement was closer, requiring a trial because in each case the parodies relied on the same verbal hooks ("always" and "business") as the originals. The music publishers appealed the ruling, but the U.S. Court of Appeals not only upheld the pro-Mad decision in regard to the 23 songs, it adopted an approach that was broad enough to strip the publishers of their limited victory regarding the remaining two songs. Writing a unanimous opinion for the United States Court of Appeals for the Second Circuit, Circuit Judge Irving Kaufman observed, "We doubt that even so eminent a composer as plaintiff Irving Berlin should be permitted to claim a property interest in iambic pentameter." The publishers again appealed, but the Supreme Court refused to hear it, allowing the decision to stand.

This precedent-setting 1964 ruling established the rights of parodists and satirists to mimic the meter of popular songs. However, the "Sing Along With Mad" songbook was not the magazine's first venture into musical parody. In 1960, Mad had published "My Fair Ad-Man", a full advertising-based spoof of the hit Broadway musical My Fair Lady. In 1959, "If Gilbert & Sullivan wrote Dick Tracy" was one of the speculative pairings in "If Famous Authors Wrote the Comics".

In 1966, a series of copyright infringement lawsuits against the magazine regarding ownership of the Alfred E. Neuman image eventually reached the appellate level. Although Harry Stuff had copyrighted the image in 1914, the U.S. Court of Appeals for the Second Circuit ruled that, by allowing many copies of the image to circulate without any copyright notice, the owner of the copyright had allowed the image to pass into the public domain, thus establishing the right of Mad—or anyone else—to use the image. In addition, Mad established that Stuff was not himself the creator of the image, by producing numerous other examples dating back to the late 19th century. This decision was also allowed to stand.

Other legal disputes were settled more easily. Following the magazine's parody of the film The Empire Strikes Back, a letter from George Lucas's lawyers arrived in Mad's offices demanding that the issue be recalled for infringement on copyrighted figures. The letter further demanded that the printing plates be destroyed, and that Lucasfilm must receive all revenue from the issue plus additional punitive damages. Unbeknownst to Lucas' lawyers, Mad had received a letter weeks earlier from Lucas himself, expressing delight over the parody and calling artist Mort Drucker and writer Dick DeBartolo "the Leonardo da Vinci and George Bernard Shaw of comic satire." Publisher Bill Gaines made a copy of Lucas' letter, added the handwritten notation "Gee, your boss George liked it!" across the top, and mailed it to the lawyers. Said DeBartolo, "We never heard from them again."

Mad was one of several parties that filed amicus curiae briefs with the Supreme Court in support of 2 Live Crew and its disputed song parody, during the 1993 Campbell v. Acuff-Rose Music, Inc. case.

== Advertising ==
Mad was long noted for its absence of advertising, enabling it to satirize materialist culture without fear of reprisal. For decades, it was the most successful American magazine to publish ad-free, beginning with issue No. 33 (June 1957) and continuing through issue No. 404 (April 2001).

As a comic book, Mad had run the same advertisements as the rest of EC's line. The magazine later made a deal with Moxie soda that involved inserting the Moxie logo into various articles. Mad ran a limited number of ads in its first two years as a magazine, helpfully labeled "real advertisement" to differentiate the real from the parodies. The last authentic ad published under the original Mad regime was for Famous Artists School; two issues later, the inside front cover of issue No. 34 had a parody of the same ad. After this transitional period, the only promotions to appear in Mad for decades were house ads for Mad's own books and specials, subscriptions, and promotional items such as ceramic busts, T-shirts, or a line of Mad jewelry. This rule was bent only a few times to promote outside products directly related to the magazine, such as The Mad Magazine Game, a series of video games based on Spy vs. Spy, and the notorious Up the Academy movie (which the magazine later disowned). Mad explicitly promised that it would never make its mailing list available.

Both Kurtzman and Feldstein wanted the magazine to solicit advertising, feeling this could be accomplished without compromising Mad's content or editorial independence. Kurtzman remembered Ballyhoo, a boisterous 1930s humor publication that made an editorial point of mocking its own sponsors. Feldstein went so far as to propose an in-house Mad ad agency, and produced a "dummy" copy of what an issue with ads could look like. But Bill Gaines was intractable, telling the television news magazine 60 Minutes, "We long ago decided we couldn't take money from Pepsi-Cola and make fun of Coca-Cola." Gaines' motivation in eschewing ad dollars was less philosophical than practical:

We'd have to improve our package. Most advertisers want to appear in a magazine that's loaded with color and has super-slick paper. So you find yourself being pushed into producing a more expensive package. You get bigger and fancier and attract more advertisers. Then you find you're losing some of your advertisers. Your readers still expect the fancy package, so you keep putting it out, but now you don't have your advertising income, which is why you got fancier in the first place—and now you're sunk.

== Contributors and criticism ==
Mad has provided a continuing showcase for many long-running satirical writers and artists. Although several of the contributors earn more than their Mad pay in fields such as television and advertising, they have continued to provide material for the publication. Among the artists were the aforementioned Davis, Elder and Wood, as well as Sergio Aragonés, Mort Drucker, Don Martin, Dave Berg, George Woodbridge, Harry North and Paul Coker. Writers such as Dick DeBartolo, Stan Hart, Frank Jacobs, Tom Koch, and Arnie Kogen appeared regularly in the magazine's pages. In several cases, only infirmity or death has ended a contributor's run at Mad.

Within the industry, Mad was known for the uncommonly prompt manner in which its contributors were paid. Publisher Gaines would typically write a personal check and give it to the artist upon receipt of the finished product. Wally Wood said, "I got spoiled ... Other publishers don't do that. I started to get upset if I had to wait a whole week for my check." Another lure for contributors was the annual "Mad Trip", an all-expenses-paid tradition that began in 1960. The editorial staff was automatically invited, along with freelancers who had qualified for an invitation by selling a set number of articles or pages during the previous year. Gaines was strict about enforcing this quota, and one year, longtime writer and frequent traveller Arnie Kogen was bumped off the list. Later that year, Gaines' mother died, and Kogen was asked if he would be attending the funeral. "I can't," said Kogen, "I don't have enough pages." Over the years, the Mad crew traveled to such locales as France, Kenya, Russia, Hong Kong, England, Amsterdam, Tahiti, Morocco, Italy, Greece, and Germany. The tradition ended with Gaines' death, and a 1993 trip to Monte Carlo.

Although Mad was an exclusively freelance publication, it achieved remarkable stability, with numerous contributors remaining prominent for decades. Critics of the magazine felt that this lack of turnover eventually led to a formulaic sameness, although there is little agreement on when the magazine peaked or plunged.

Many people have proclaimed moments that they say triggered the magazine's irreversible decline. Among the most frequently cited "downward turning points" are: creator-editor Harvey Kurtzman's departure in 1957; the magazine's mainstream success; adoption of recurring features starting in the early 1960s; the magazine's absorption into a more corporate structure in 1968 (or later, the mid-1990s); founder Gaines' death in 1992; the magazine's publicized "edgy revamp" in 1997; the arrival of paid advertising in 2001; or the magazine's 2018 move to California. Mad has been criticized for its over-reliance on a core group of aging regulars throughout the 1970s and 1980s, and then criticized again for an alleged downturn as those same creators began to leave, die, retire, or contribute less frequently.

It has been proposed that Mad is more susceptible to this criticism than many media because a sizable percentage of its readership turns over regularly as it ages, as Mad focuses greatly on current events and a changing popular culture. In 2010, Sergio Aragonés said, "Mad is written by people who never thought 'Okay, I'm going to write for kids,' or 'I'm going to write for adults.' ... And many people say 'I used to read Mad, but Mad has changed a lot.' Excuse me— you grew up! You have new interests. ... The change doesn't come from the magazine, it comes from the people who grow or don't grow." Mad poked fun at the tendency of readers to accuse the magazine of declining in quality at various points in its history in its "Untold History of Mad Magazine", a self-referential faux history in the 400th issue which joked: "The second issue of Mad goes on sale on December 9, 1952. On December 11, the first-ever letter complaining that Mad 'just isn't as funny and original like it used to be' arrives." The magazine's art director, Sam Viviano, suggested in 2002 that historically, Mad was at its best "whenever you first started reading it." According to former Mad Senior Editor Joe Raiola, "Mad is the only place in America where if you mature, you get fired."

Among the loudest of those who insist the magazine is no longer funny are supporters of Harvey Kurtzman, who left Mad after just 28 issues.

However, just how much of that success was due to the original Kurtzman template that he left for his successor, and how much should be credited to the Al Feldstein system and the depth of the post-Kurtzman talent pool, can be argued without resolution. In 2009, an interviewer proposed to Al Jaffee, "There's a group of Mad aficionados who feel that if Harvey Kurtzman had stayed at Mad, the magazine would not only have been different, but better." Jaffee, a Kurtzman enthusiast, replied, "And then there's a large group who feel that if Harvey had stayed with Mad, he would have upgraded it to the point that only fifteen people would buy it." During Kurtzman's final two-plus years at EC, Mad appeared erratically (ten issues appeared in 1954, followed by eight issues in 1955 and four issues in 1956). Feldstein was less well regarded creatively, but kept the magazine on a regular schedule, leading to decades of success. (Kurtzman and Will Elder returned to Mad for a short time in the mid-1980s as an illustrating team.)

The magazine's sales peak came with issue No. 161 (September 1973), which sold 2.4 million copies in 1973. That period coincided with several other magazines' sales peaks, including TV Guide and Playboy. Mad's circulation dropped below one million for the first time in 1983.

Many of the magazine's mainstays began retiring or dying by the 1980s. Newer contributors who appeared in the years that followed include Joe Raiola, Charlie Kadau, Tony Barbieri, Scott Bricher, Tom Bunk, John Caldwell, Desmond Devlin, Drew Friedman, Barry Liebmann, Kevin Pope, Scott Maiko, Hermann Mejia, Tom Richmond, Andrew J. Schwartzberg, Mike Snider, Greg Theakston, Nadina Simon, Rick Tulka, and Bill Wray.

On April 1, 1997, the magazine publicized an alleged "revamp", ostensibly designed to reach an older, more sophisticated readership. However, Salon's David Futrelle opined that such content had been present in Mad for a long time:

The October 1971 issue, for example, with its war crimes fold-in and back cover "mini-poster" of "The Four Horsemen of the Metropolis" (Drugs, Graft, Pollution and Slums). With its Mad Pollution Primer. With its "Reality Street" TV satire, taking a poke at the idealized images of interracial harmony on Sesame Street. ("It's a street of depression,/ Corruption, oppression!/ It's a sadist's dream come true!/ And masochists, too!") With its "This is America" photo feature, contrasting images of heroic astronauts with graphic photos of dead soldiers and junkies shooting up. I remember this issue pretty well; it was one of the ones I picked up at a garage sale and read to death. I seem to remember asking my parents what "graft" was. One of the joys of Mad for me at the time was that it was always slightly over my head. From "Mad's Up-Dated Modern Day Mother Goose" I learned about Andy Warhol, Spiro Agnew and Timothy Leary ("Wee Timmy Leary/ Soars through the sky/ Upward and Upward/ Till he's, oh, so, high/ Since this rhyme's for kiddies/ How do we explain/ That Wee Timmy Leary/ Isn't in a plane?"). From "Greeting Cards for the Sexual Revolution" I learned about "Gay Liberationists" and leather-clad "Sex Fetishists." I read the Mad versions of a whole host of films I never in a million years would have been allowed to see: Easy Rider ("Sleazy Riders"), Midnight Cowboy ("Midnight Wowboy"), Five Easy Pieces ("Five Easy Pages [and two hard ones].") I learned about the John Birch Society and Madison Avenue.

Mad editor John Ficarra acknowledged that changes in culture made the task of creating fresh satire more difficult, telling an interviewer, "The editorial mission statement has always been the same: 'Everyone is lying to you, including magazines. Think for yourself. Question authority.' But it's gotten harder, as they've gotten better at lying and getting in on the joke."

Mad contributor Tom Richmond has responded to critics who say the magazine's decision to accept advertising would make late publisher William Gaines "turn over in his grave", pointing out this is impossible because Gaines was cremated.

=== Contributors ===
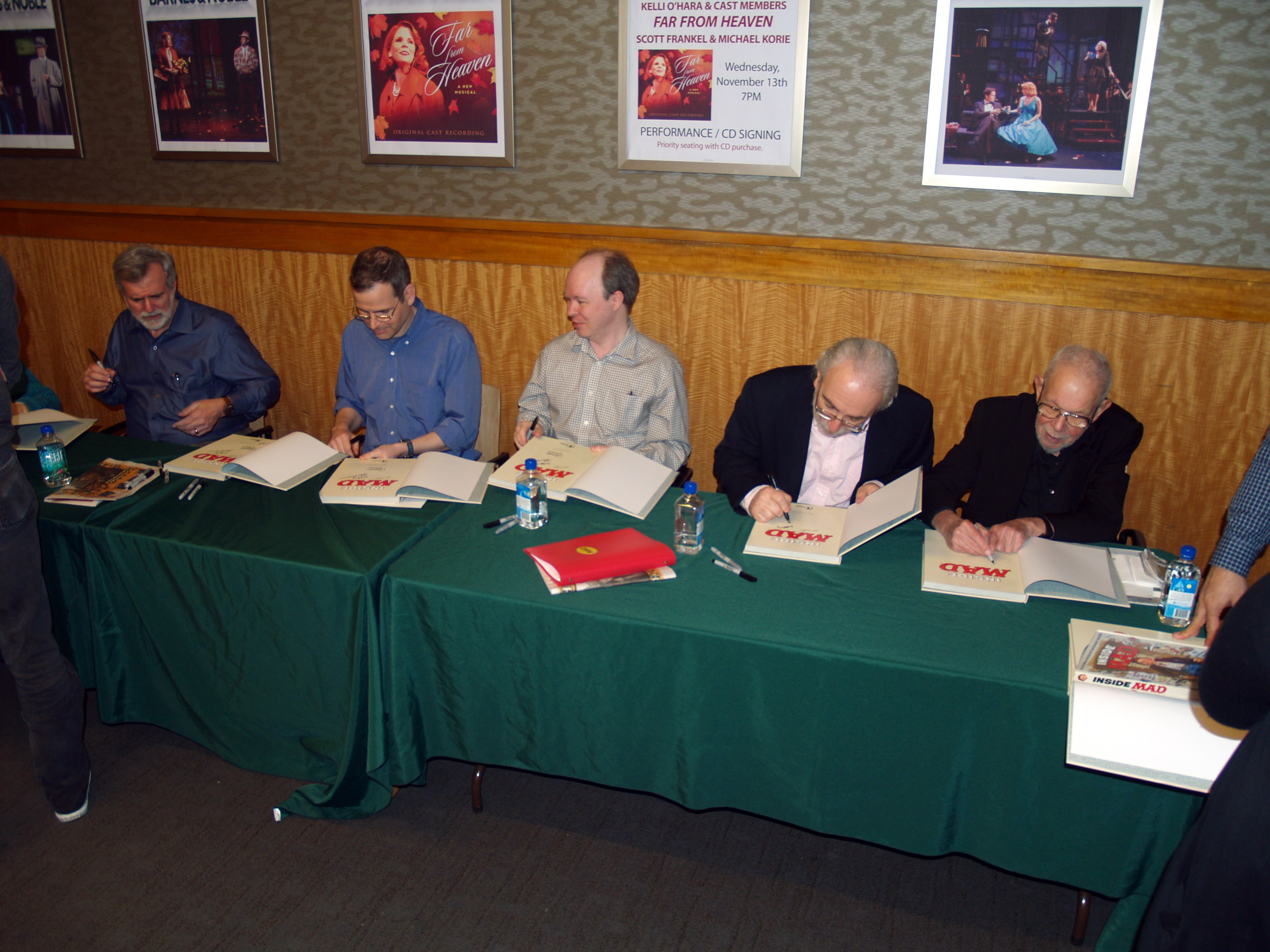
Mad creators at a November 2013 book signing for the Inside Mad collection. From left to right: Art director Sam Viviano, writers Tim Carvell and Desmond Devlin, editor-in-chief John Ficarra, and artist Al Jaffee.

Mad is known for the stability and longevity of its talent roster, billed as "The Usual Gang of Idiots", with several creators enjoying 30-, 40- and even 50-year careers in the magazine's pages.

According to the "Mad Magazine Contributor Appearances" website, more than 960 contributors have received bylines in at least one issue of Mad, but only 41 of those have contributed to 100 issues or more. Writer-artist Al Jaffee has appeared in the most issues; No. 550 (April 2018) was the 500th issue with new work by Jaffee. The other three contributors to have appeared in more than 400 issues of Mad are Sergio Aragonés, Dick DeBartolo, and Mort Drucker; Dave Berg, Paul Coker, and Frank Jacobs have each topped the 300 mark.

Jaffee, Aragonés, Berg, Don Edwing and Don Martin are the five writer-artists to have appeared in the largest total of issues; DeBartolo, Jacobs, Desmond Devlin, Stan Hart, and Tom Koch are the five most frequent writers, and Drucker, Coker, Bob Clarke, Angelo Torres and George Woodbridge are the five top illustrators on the list. (The list calculates appearances by issue only, not by individual articles or overall page count; e.g. although Jacobs wrote three separate articles that appeared in issue No. 172, his total is reckoned to have increased by one.)

Each of the following contributors has created over 100 articles for the magazine:

Writers:

- Dick DeBartolo
- Desmond Devlin
- Stan Hart
- Frank Jacobs
- Charlie Kadau
- Tom Koch
- Arnie Kogen
- Jeff Kruse
- Scott Maiko
- Joe Raiola
- Larry Siegel
- Lou Silverstone
- Mike Snider

Writer-Artists:

- Sergio Aragonés
- Dave Berg
- John Caldwell
- Duck Edwing
- Al Jaffee
- Peter Kuper
- Don Martin
- Teresa Burns Parkhurst
- Paul Peter Porges
- Antonio Prohías

Artists:

- Scott Bricher
- Tom Bunk
- Bob Clarke
- Paul Coker
- Jack Davis
- Mort Drucker
- Will Elder
- Hermann Mejia
- Joe Orlando
- Tom Richmond
- Jack Rickard
- John Severin
- Angelo Torres
- Rick Tulka
- Sam Viviano
- Wally Wood
- George Woodbridge

Photographer:

- Irving Schild

Over the years, the editorial staff, most notably Al Feldstein, Nick Meglin, John Ficarra, Joe Raiola, and Charlie Kadau have had creative input on countless articles and shaped Mad's distinctive satiric voice.

=== Other notable contributors ===
Among the irregular contributors with just a single Mad byline to their credit are Charles M. Schulz, Chevy Chase, Andy Griffith, Will Eisner, Kevin Smith, J. Fred Muggs, Boris Vallejo, Sir John Tenniel, Jean Shepherd, Winona Ryder, Jimmy Kimmel, Jason Alexander, Walt Kelly, Rep. Barney Frank, Tom Wolfe, Steve Allen, Jim Lee, Jules Feiffer, Donald Knuth, and Richard Nixon, who remains the only President credited with "writing" a Mad article. (The entire text was taken from Nixon's speeches.)

Those who have contributed twice apiece include Tom Lehrer, Wally Cox, Gustave Doré, Danny Kaye, Stan Freberg and Mort Walker. Appearing slightly more frequently were Frank Frazetta (3 bylines), Ernie Kovacs (11), Bob and Ray (12), Henry Morgan (3), and Sid Caesar (4). In its earliest years, before amassing its own staff of regulars, the magazine frequently used outside "name" talent. Often, Mad would simply illustrate the celebrities' preexisting material while promoting their names on the cover. The Bob and Ray association was particularly fruitful. When the magazine learned that Tom Koch was the writer behind the Bob and Ray radio sketches adapted by Mad, Koch was sought out by the editors and ultimately wrote more than 300 Mad articles over the next 37 years.

The magazine has occasionally run guest articles in which notables from show business or comic books have participated. In 1964, an article called "Comic Strips They'd Really Like To Do" featured one-shot proposals by cartoonists including Mell Lazarus and Charles M. Schulz. More than once, the magazine has enlisted popular comic book artists such as Frank Miller or Jim Lee to design and illustrate a series of "Rejected Superheroes." In 2008, the magazine got national coverage for its article "Why George W. Bush is in Favor of Global warming". Each of the piece's 10 punchlines was illustrated by a different Pulitzer Prize-winning editorial cartoonist. In 2015, "Weird Al" Yankovic served as the magazine's first and only guest editor, writing some material and guiding the content in issue No. 533, while upping his own career Mad byline total from two to five.

== Reprints ==
In 1955, Gaines began presenting reprints of material for Mad in black-and-white paperbacks, the first being The Mad Reader. Many of these featured new covers by Mad cover artist Norman Mingo. This practice continued into the 2000s, with more than 100 Mad paperbacks published. Gaines made a special effort to keep the entire line of paperbacks in print at all times, and the books were frequently reprinted in new editions with different covers. There were also dozens of Mad paperbacks featuring entirely new material by the magazine's contributors.

Mad also frequently repackaged its material in a long series of "Special" format magazines, beginning in 1958 with two concurrent annual series entitled The Worst from Mad and More Trash from Mad. Later, the "Special" issue series expanded to "Super Special" editions. Various other titles have been used through the years. These reprint issues were sometimes augmented by exclusive features such as posters, stickers and, on a few occasions, recordings on flexi-disc. A 1972 "Special" edition began Mad's including a comic book replica insert, consisting of reprinted material from the magazine's 1952–1955 era.

=== Facsimile Edition ===
A Facsimile Edition of Mad #1, reprinting the entire issue (including the original advertisements), was published by DC Comics on June 4, 2024. The official title of the Facsimile Edition, as per the indicia, is "Mad Magazine 1 (Facsimile Edition)," whereas the official indicia title of the original publication, in both comic book and magazine format, has always been just "Mad" (not "Mad Magazine"), and the original Mad #1 it reprints was not a magazine but a comic book. (The only Mad #1 that was originally published as a physical magazine was the first issue of the 2018 reboot.)

== Spin-offs ==
=== Mad Kids ===
Between 2005 and February 17, 2009, the magazine published 14 issues of Mad Kids, a spinoff publication aimed at a younger demographic. Reminiscent of Nickelodeon's newsstand titles, it emphasized current kids' entertainment (e.g. Yu-Gi-Oh!, Naruto, High School Musical), albeit with an impudent voice. Much of the content of Mad Kids had originally appeared in the parent publication; reprinted material was chosen and edited to reflect grade schoolers' interests. But the quarterly magazine also included newly commissioned articles and cartoons, as well as puzzles, bonus inserts, a calendar, and the other activity-related content that is common to kids' magazines.

=== Foreign editions ===
Mad has been published in local versions in many countries, beginning with the United Kingdom in 1959, and Sweden in 1960. Each new market receives access to the publication's back catalog of articles and is also encouraged to produce its own localized material in the Mad vein. However, the sensibility of the American Mad has not always translated to other cultures, and many of the foreign editions have had short lives or interrupted publications. The Swedish, Danish, Italian and Mexican Mads were each published on three separate occasions; Norway has had four runs canceled. Brazil also had four runs, but without significant interruptions, spanning five decades. Australia (42 years), United Kingdom (35 years), and Sweden (34 years) have produced the longest uninterrupted Mad variants.

Defunct foreign editions

- United Kingdom, 1959–1994; (still use the US version today)
- Australia, 1980–2022;
- Sweden, 1960–1993, 1997–2002;
- Denmark, 1962–1971, 1979–1997, 1998–2002;
- Netherlands, 1964–1996; 2011–2012;
- France, 1965, 1982;
- Germany, 1967–1995, 1998–2018;
- Finland, 1970–1972, 1982–2005;
- Italy, 1971–1974, 1984, 1992–1993;
- Norway, 1971–1972, 1981–1996, 2001 (one-offs 2002–2003);
- Mad_(revista)#Mad_no_Brasil, 1974–1983, 1984–2000, 2000–2006; 2008–2017;
- Spain, 1974, 1975 (as Locuras), 2006–2016;
- Argentina, 1977–1982;
- Mexico, 1977–1983, 1984–1986, 1993–1998; 2004–2010
- Caribbean, 1977–1983;
- Greece, 1978–1985, 1995–1999;
- Japan, 1979–1980 (two oversized anthologies were released);
- Iceland, 1985; 1987–1988;
- South Africa, 1985–2009;
- Taiwan, 1990;
- Canada (Quebec), 1991–1992 (Past material in a "collection album" with Croc, another Quebec humor magazine);
- Hungary, 1997–2001;
- Israel, 1994–1995;
- Turkey, 2000–2001;
- Poland, 2015–2018. (collections only)

Conflicts over content have occasionally arisen between the parent magazine and its international franchisees. When a comic strip satirizing the British royal family was reprinted in a Mad paperback, it was deemed necessary to rip out the page from 25,000 copies by hand before the book could be distributed in Great Britain. But Mad was also protective of its own editorial standards. Bill Gaines sent "one of his typically dreadful, blistering letters" to his Dutch editors after they published a bawdy gag about a men's room urinal. Mad has since relaxed its requirements, and while the U.S. version still eschews overt profanity, the magazine generally poses no objections to more provocative content.

=== Other satiric-comics magazines ===
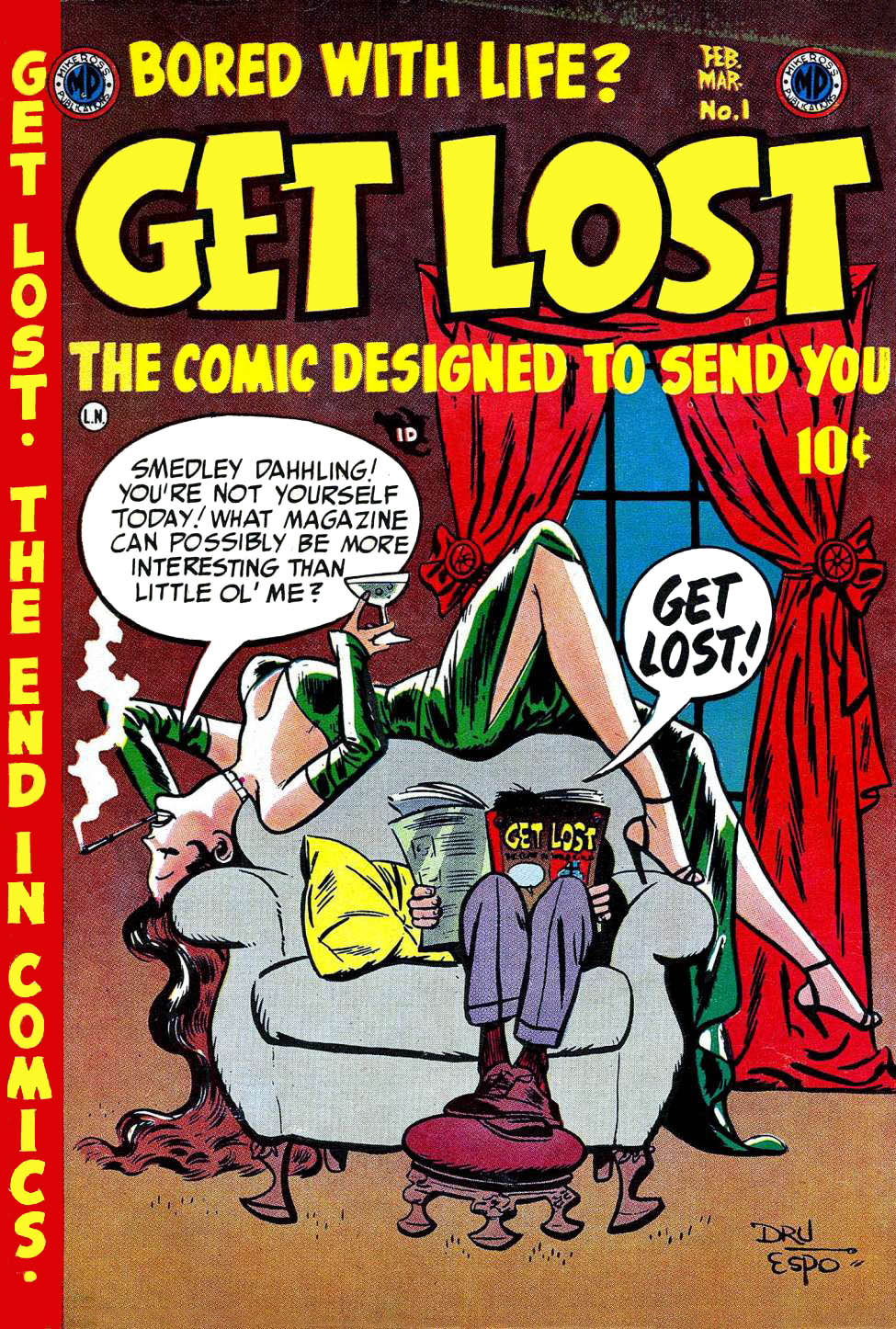
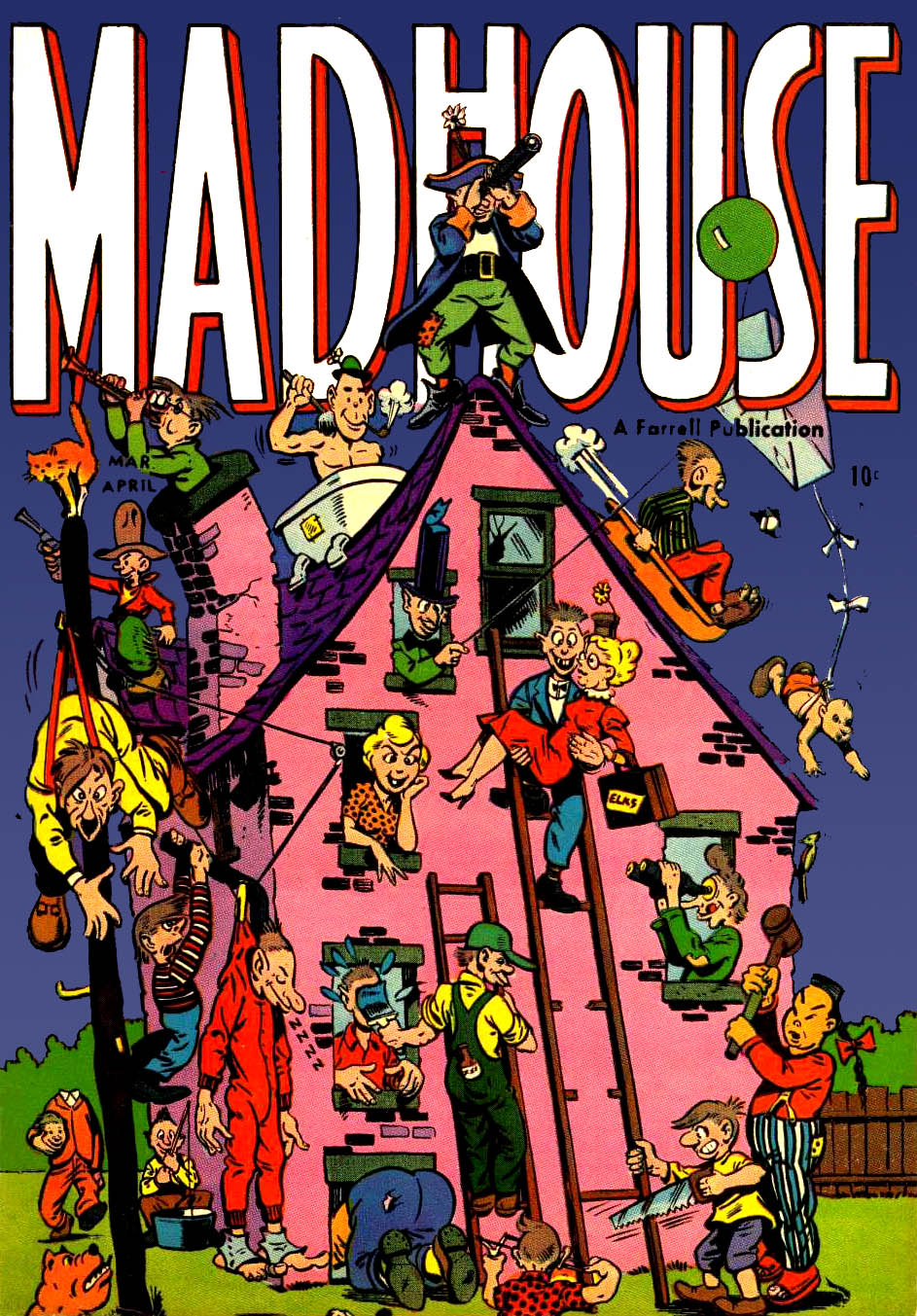
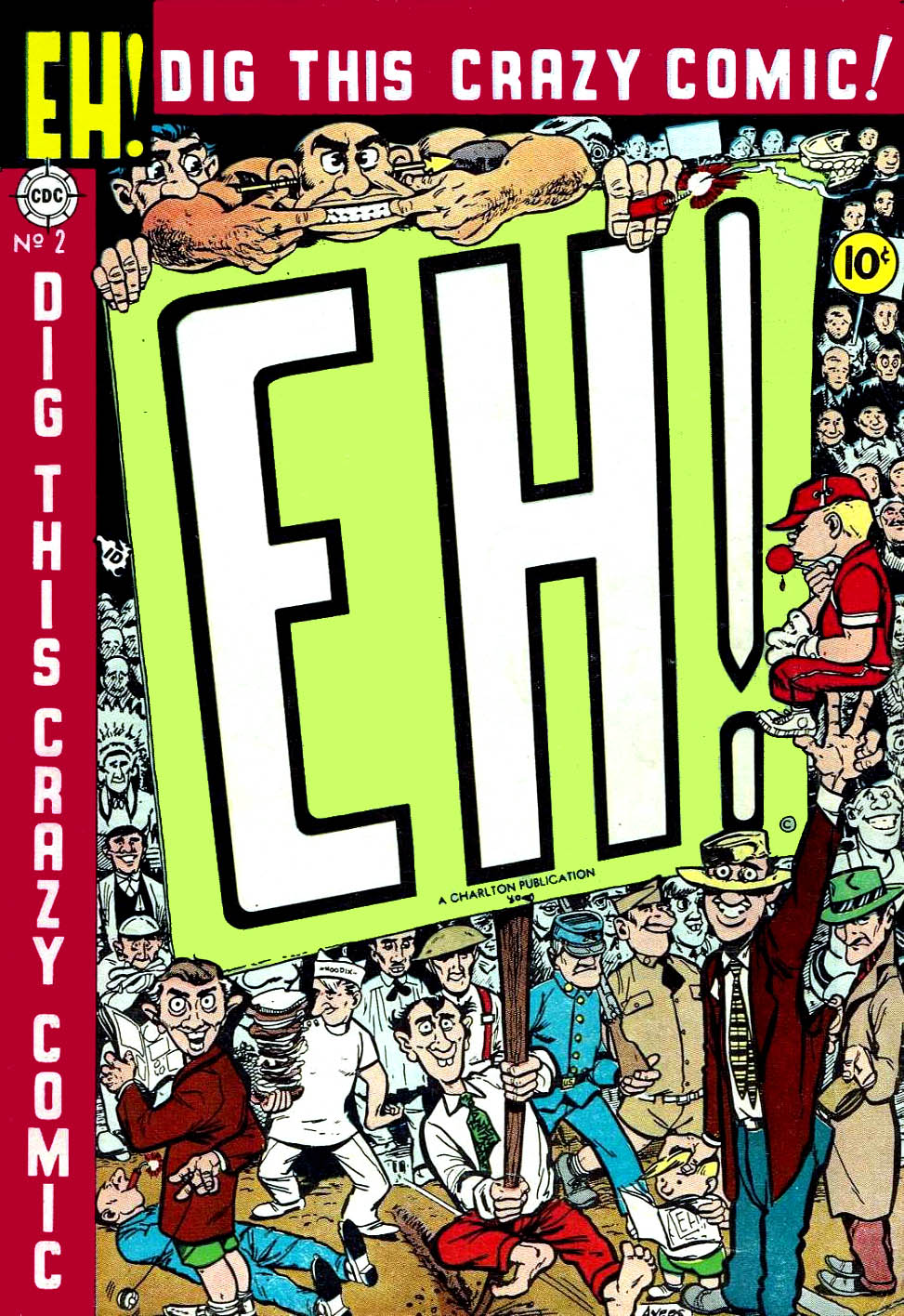
The success of Mad inspired a rash of short-lived imitators.

Following the success of Mad, other black-and-white magazines of topical, satiric comics began to be published. Most were short-lived. The three longest-lasting were Cracked, Sick, and Crazy Magazine. These three and many others featured a cover mascot along the lines of Alfred E. Neuman.

Color comic-book competitors, primarily in the mid-to-late 1950s, were Nuts!, Get Lost, Whack, Riot, Flip, Eh!, From Here to Insanity, and Madhouse; only the last of these lasted as many as eight issues, and some were canceled after an issue or two. Later color satiric comic books included Wild, Blast, Parody, Grin and Gag!. EC Comics itself offered the color comic Panic, produced by future Mad editor Al Feldstein. Two years after EC's Panic had ceased publication in 1956, the title was used by another publisher for a similar comic.

In 1967, Marvel Comics produced the first of 13 issues of the comic book Not Brand Echh, which parodied the company's own superhero titles as well as other publishers. From 1973 to 1976, DC Comics published the comic Plop!, which featured Mad stalwart Sergio Aragonés and frequent cover art by Basil Wolverton. Another publisher's comic was Trash (1978) featured a blurb on the debut cover reading, "We mess with Mad (p. 21)" and depicted Alfred E. Neuman with a stubbly beard; the fourth and last issue showed two bodybuilders holding up copies of Mud and Crocked with the frowning faces of Neuman and Cracked cover mascot Sylvester P. Smythe.

Among other U.S. humor magazines that included some degree of comics art as well as text articles were former Mad editor Harvey Kurtzman's Trump, Humbug and Help!, as well as National Lampoon.

In 2019 Mad contributor Andrew Goldfarb started Freaky, a humor magazine in tribute to Mad, featuring several other artists who had worked on Mad and Cracked.

Virginia Commonwealth University's Cabell Library has an extensive collection of Mad along with other comic books and graphic novels.

=== Claptrap ===
With Mad ceasing the regular publication of new material after 2019, including film parodies, in future issues, the magazine's veteran writer Desmond Devlin and caricaturist Tom Richmond announced that they would be teaming up to create Claptrap (ISBN 9780983576716), a book full of twelve brand new movie parodies done in the classic Mad style. The movies are classics that Mad did not parody when they were first released. First scheduled to be released in November 2021, it was delayed four times, first to March, then August, then December 2022, and finally to June 2023.

== In other media ==
Over the years, Mad has branched out from print into other media. During the Gaines years, the publisher had an aversion to exploiting his fan base and expressed the fear that substandard Mad products would offend them. He was known to personally issue refunds to anyone who wrote to the magazine with a complaint. Among the few outside Mad items available in its first 40 years were cufflinks, a T-shirt designed like a straitjacket (complete with lock), and a small ceramic Alfred E. Neuman bust. For decades, the letters page advertised an inexpensive portrait of Neuman ("suitable for framing or for wrapping fish") with misleading slogans such as "Only 1 Left!" (The joke being that the picture was so undesirable that only one had left their office since the last ad.) After Gaines' death came an overt absorption into the Time-Warner publishing umbrella, with the result that Mad merchandise began to appear more frequently. Items were displayed in the Warner Bros. Studio Stores, and in 1994 The Mad Style Guide was created for licensing use.

=== Recordings ===
Mad has sponsored or inspired a number of recordings.

==== 1950s ====
In 1959, Bernie Green "with the Stereo Mad-Men" recorded the album Musically Mad for RCA Victor, featuring humorous music, mostly instrumental, with an image of Alfred E. Neuman on the cover; it was nominated for the Grammy for Best Comedy Recording - Musical and has been reissued on CD. That same year, The Worst from Mad No. 2 included an original recording, "Meet the staff of Mad", on a cardboard 33 rpm record, while a single credited to Alfred E. Neuman & The Furshlugginger Five: "What – Me Worry?" (b/w "Potrzebie"), was issued in late 1959 on the ABC Paramount label.

==== 1960s ====
Two full vinyl LP records were released under the aegis of Mad in the early 1960s: Mad "Twists" Rock 'N' Roll (1962) and Fink Along With Mad (1963; the title being a takeoff on the then-popular TV show Sing Along With Mitch, with "fink" being a general insult then current in American slang).

In 1961, New York City doo-wop group The Dellwoods (recording then as the "Sweet Sickteens") had released a novelty single on RCA Victor, written by Norman Blagman and Sam Bobrick, "The Pretzel" (a satiric take on then-current dance songs such as "The Twist"), b/w "Agnes (The Teenage Russian Spy)". Both songs were later included on Mad "Twists" Rock 'N' Roll. (The Sweet Sickteens were Victor Buccellato (lead singer), Mike Ellis (tenor), Andy Ventura (tenor), Amadeo Tese (baritone), and Saul Zeskand (bass),

It's surprisingly straightforward teen-era rock 'n' roll...lyrically the songs do a decent job of matching Mad's off-kilter look at society... a few of these songs would be hard to differentiate as parody when compared to other records from the era. "Blind Date" wouldn't be out of place slightly trashed up on a Kingsmen album...

— Bob Koch, Vinyl Cave (Isthmus)

In 1962, the Dellwoods (as they were now named), along with vocalists Mike Russo and Jeanne Hayes, recorded an entire album of novelty songs by Bobrick and Blagman. The album had originally been written and produced as a Dellwoods album for RCA Victor, but was instead sold to Mad and released on Bigtop Records as Mad "Twists" Rock 'N' Roll. There was a strong Mad tie in – besides the title, a portrait of Alfred E. Neuman was featured prominently on the cover, and "(She Got A) Nose Job" from the album was bound as a flexi disc into an issue of Mad. None of the material, however, referenced Mad magazine, Alfred E. Neuman, or any other Mad tropes or features, having been recorded before the sale by RCA Victor. Other songs on the album included "(Throwing The) High School Basketball Game", "Please Betty Jean (Shave Your Legs)", "Somebody Else's Dandruff (On My Lover-Baby's Shirt)". "Agnes (The Teenage Russian Spy)" and "The Pretzel" (now titled as "Let's Do The Pretzel (And End Up Like One!))".

This was followed by another Dellwoods Bigtop release, Fink Along With Mad, again with Russo and Hayes, written by Bobrick and Blagman, and tied in with Mad, in 1963. Album tracks included "She Lets Me Watch Her Mom And Pop Fight" which was bound as a flexi-disc into an issue of Mad (the performance credited to Mike Russo, and described by Josiah Hughes as "one dark pop song" since it makes light of domestic assault, with lyrics such as "To see a lamp go through the window / And watch them kick and scratch and bite / I love her, I love her, oh boy how I love her / 'Cause she lets me watch her mom and pop fight.")

Other songs on Fink Along With Mad included "I'll Never Make Fun of Her Moustache Again", "When the Braces on our Teeth Lock", and "Loving A Siamese Twin". This album also featured a song titled "It's a Gas", which punctuated an instrumental track with belches (these "vocals" being credited to Alfred E. Neuman), along with a saxophone break by an uncredited King Curtis). Dr. Demento featured this gaseous performance on his radio show in Los Angeles in the early 1970s. Mad included some of these tracks as plastic-laminated cardboard inserts and (later) flexi discs with their reprint "Mad Specials".

"Don't Put Onions On Your Hamburger" from the album was released as a single, credited to just the Dellwoods, and in 1963 the Dellwoods renamed themselves to the Dynamics and released a serious non-novelty single for Liberty Records, "Chapel On A Hill" backed with "Conquistador".

==== 1970s and later ====
A number of original recordings also were released in this way in the 1970s and early 1980s, such as Gall in the Family Fare (a radio play adaptation of their previously illustrated All in the Family parody), a single entitled "Makin' Out", the octuple-grooved track "It's a Super Spectacular Day", which had eight possible endings, the spoken word Meet the staff insert, and a six-track, 30-minute Mad Disco EP (from the 1980 special of the same title) that included a disco version of "It's a Gas". The last turntable-playable recording Mad packaged with its magazines was "A Mad Look at Graduation", in a 1982 special. A CD-ROM containing several audio tracks was included with issue No. 350 (October 1996). Rhino Records compiled a number of Mad-recorded tracks as Mad Grooves (1996).

=== Stage show ===
An Off-Broadway production, The Mad Show, was first staged in 1966. The show, which lasted for 871 performances during its initial run, featured sketches written by Mad regulars Stan Hart and Larry Siegel interspersed with comedic songs (one of which was written by an uncredited Stephen Sondheim). The cast album is available on CD.

=== Gaming ===
In 1979, Mad released a board game. The Mad Magazine Game was an absurdist version of Monopoly in which the first player to lose all his money and go bankrupt was the winner. Profusely illustrated with artwork by the magazine's contributors, the game included a $1,329,063 bill that could not be won unless one's name was "Alfred E. Neuman". It also featured a deck of cards (called "Card cards") with bizarre instructions, such as "If you can jump up and stay airborne for 37 seconds, you can lose $5,000. If not, jump up and lose $500." In 1980 a second game was released: The Mad Magazine Card Game by Parker Brothers. In it, the player who first loses all their cards is declared the winner. The game is fairly similar to Uno by Mattel. Questions based on the magazine also appeared in the 1999 Trivial Pursuit: Warner Bros. Edition (which featured questions based around Time-Warner properties, including WB films and TV shows, the Looney Tunes/Merrie Melodies cartoons (and follow-up projects from Warner Bros. Animation)), as well as DC Comics, Hanna-Barbera, Cartoon Network and assorted MGM properties owned by Turner Entertainment Co. that WB had come into possession of following the 1996 Turner/Time-Warner merger.

=== Film and television ===
Mad lent its name in 1980 to the risque comedy Up the Academy. Up the Academy was such a commercial debacle and critical failure that Mad successfully arranged for all references to the magazine (including a cameo by Alfred E. Neuman) to be removed from future TV and video releases of the film, although these references were eventually restored on the DVD version, which was titled Mad Magazine Presents Up the Academy.

In 1974, a Mad animated television pilot using selected material from the magazine was commissioned by ABC, but the network decided not to broadcast it. Dick DeBartolo noted, "Nobody wanted to sponsor a show that made fun of products that were advertised on TV, like car manufacturers." The program was instead reworked into The Mad Magazine TV Special, which also went unbroadcast for the same reasons. The special was made by Focus Entertainment Inc., and was available for online viewing in SD quality until 2022, when a 2K resolution scan of a 16mm film print was released online; The print was provided by one of the special's animators.

In the mid-1980s, Hanna-Barbera developed another potential Mad animated television series that was never broadcast.

In 1995, Fox Broadcasting Company's Mad TV licensed the use of the magazine's logo and characters. However, aside from short bumpers which animated existing Spy vs. Spy (1994–1998) and Don Martin (1995–2000) cartoons during the show's first three seasons, there was no editorial or stylistic connection between the TV show and the magazine. Produced by Quincy Jones, the sketch comedy series was in the vein of NBC's Saturday Night Live and Global/CBC's SCTV, and ran for 14 seasons and 321 episodes. On January 12, 2016, The CW aired an hour-long special celebrating the series' 20th anniversary. A large portion of the original cast returned. An eight-episode revival featuring a brand new cast premiered on July 26, 2016.

Animated Spy vs. Spy sequences were also seen in TV ads for Mountain Dew soda in 2004.

In September 2010, Cartoon Network began airing the animated series Mad, from Warner Bros. Animation and executive producer Sam Register. Produced by Kevin Shinick and Mark Marek, the series was composed of animated shorts and sketches lampooning current television shows, films, games and other aspects of popular culture, in a similar manner to the adult stop-motion animated sketch comedy Robot Chicken (of which Shinick was formerly a writer and is currently a recurring voice actor); in fact, Robot Chicken co-creator Seth Green occasionally provided voices on Mad as well. Critics and viewers have often cited the series as a kid-friendly version of Robot Chicken. Much like Mad TV's, this series also features appearances by Spy vs. Spy and Don Martin cartoons. The series ran from September 6, 2010, to December 2, 2013, lasting for four seasons and 103 episodes.

=== Video games ===
In 1984, the Spy vs. Spy characters were given their own video game series in which players can set traps for each other. The games were made for various computer systems such as the Atari 8-bit computers, Apple II, Commodore 64, ZX Spectrum, Master System and Nintendo Entertainment System. Whereas the original game took place in a nondescript building, the sequels transposed the action to a desert island for Spy vs. Spy: The Island Caper and a polar setting for Spy vs. Spy: Arctic Antics.

Not to be confused with the later television show, Mad TV is a television station management simulation computer game produced in 1991 by Rainbow Arts for the Mad franchise. It was released on the PC and the Amiga. It is faithful to the magazine's general style of cartoon humor but does not include any of the original characters except for a brief closeup of Alfred E. Neuman's eyes during the opening screens.

Another Spy vs. Spy video game was made in 2005 for the PlayStation 2 and Xbox. A Mad app was released for iPad on April 1, 2012. It displayed the contents of each new issue beginning with Mad No. 507, as well as video clips from Cartoon Network's Mad, and material from the magazine's website, The Idiotical.

=== Computer software ===
In 1996, Mad No. 350 included a CD-ROM featuring Mad-related software as well as three audio files. In 1999, Broderbund/The Learning Company released Totally Mad, a Microsoft Windows 95/98-compatible CD-ROM set collecting the magazine's content from No. 1 through No. 376 (December 1998), plus over 100 Mad Specials including most of the recorded audio inserts. Despite the title, it omitted a handful of articles due to problems clearing the rights on some book excerpts and text taken from recordings, such as Andy Griffith's "What It Was, Was Football". In 2006, Graphic Imaging Technology's DVD-ROM Absolutely Mad updated the original Totally Mad content through 2005. A single seven-gigabyte disc, it is missing the same deleted material from the 1999 collection. It differs from the earlier release in that it is Macintosh compatible.

== See also ==
- History of Mad
- Recurring features in Mad
- List of film spoofs in Mad
- List of television show spoofs in Mad
- 43-Man Squamish
- Mad (TV series)
- MADtv
- Potrzebie
- Cracked magazine
