= Rick Tulka =

American illustrator

Rick Tulka (born in 1955) is an American illustrator and caricaturist whose work has appeared in Mad magazine since 1988. He has been living and working in Paris since the mid-1990s.

== Early life and education ==
Tulka was born in Brooklyn, New York City in 1955. He was educated at the Brooklyn Museum Art School and the Art Students League of New York, and later majored in illustration at Pratt Institute. He was influenced by such artists as Charles M. Schulz, Winsor McCay, Honoré Daumier, Al Hirschfeld, Edgar Degas, Henri de Toulouse-Lautrec, Vincent van Gogh, Hans Holbein and Ben Sargent. Since 1976, he began working as a professional illustrator and his first works appeared in Cue Magazine. In 1988, he published his first drawing in Mad magazine and has worked with the magazine since.

== Creative work ==
In 1988, Tulka illustrated Moonwalker – The Coloring Book for children with Michael Jackson. He illustrated articles and specialized in caricatures of celebrities. He did most of his works as a series which had "narrative sequences". The most known of these works of him is the 'Six Degrees of Separation' which issued in 1997 for the first time. "It features satirical links between various celebrities, pop culture characters and phenomena". In addition to Mad he also drew for the like of People Weekly, Reader's Digest, Money Magazine and Rolling Stone.

In 1995, he and his wife moved to Paris. In 1998 he was the only courtroom sketch artist to be present at the Augusta-Dassault trial for Belgium’s Le Soir. "He made a series of caricatures of French politicians which are on permanent exhibition in the Parisian parliament". In 2015 after the tragic events with the Charlie-Hebdo in Paris he participated in the Peaceful demonstrations that was held to support the journalists. In addition to his personal sketch book which he started in 1973 he gathered a great collection of celebrity caricatures many of which bear signatures of the famous faces themselves. Among his famous caricatures are the likes of Michael Jackson, Elizabeth Taylor, Spike Lee, Mikhail Baryshnikov, Liza Minnelli, Lucille Ball, Stephen Sondheim and Johnny Carson. He also made the book Today I Am A Ma’am with the actress Valerie Harper in 2001.

In 2007, he was featured on the CBS Sunday Morning show in conjunction with the release of the book he co-authored with Noël Riley Fitch, Paris Café: The Sélect Crowd (Soft Skull Press). Dozens of Tulka's caricatures of Parisians, drawn from life at the historical literary café, Le Sélect, are featured in the book.

Tulka has cooperated with such United States' media and organizations as The Wall Street Journal, The Madison Square Garden Theater, Harper's Magazine, The Playboy Jazz Festival, Michael Jackson/MJJ Productions and much more. His works have also appeared in French Le Monde, Marianne, Télérama, Famili, Charlie Hebdo etc.
