= George Woodbridge (illustrator) =

American illustrator

- Born: October 3, 1930; Flushing, Queens, New York City
- Died: January 20, 2004 (aged 73); New York City
- Education: School of Visual Arts, New York City
- Known for: Illustration

George Woodbridge's drawing of a Bacon's Rebellion soldier in 1675

George Woodbridge (October 3, 1930 – January 20, 2004) was an American illustrator known for his exhaustive research and historical accuracy, and for his 44-year run as a contributor to MAD Magazine. He was sometimes referred to as "America's Dean of Uniform Illustration" because of his expertise in drawing military uniforms.

Born in Flushing, Queens, Woodbridge studied illustration at Manhattan's School of Visual Arts. In later years, he lived on Staten Island, where he created his detailed drawings of military uniforms, insignia and equipment.

== Military history ==
He illustrated many military history books, including the Time/Life Civil War history, George Neumann's Collector's Illustrated Encyclopedia of the American Revolution and Frederick P. Todd's three-volume American Military Equipage, 1851–1872: A Description by Word and Picture of What the American Soldier, Sailor and Marine of These Years Wore and Carried. He was named a fellow of the Company of Military Historians in 1961.

Woodbridge was an early advocate for and participant in the hobby of historical reenacting, particularly that of the American Revolution which was always a special interest of his. During the American Revolution Bicentennial of 1975 - 1981, he served as commander of the association of reenactors known as the Brigade of the American Revolution which participated in many events during the period. Woodbridge also was credited as historical technical adviser to the 1986 Alan Alda film Sweet Liberty.

== Mad ==
In March 1957, Woodbridge began as a freelancer to Mad when Al Feldstein was the editor. Feldstein observed, "George's strong points were many. He was especially adept at delineating amusing street scenes with crowds and signs and outlandish going-ons, as well as depicting humorous interpretations of just plain people in comedic human situations. The articles he was assigned to illustrate were chosen with those superb talents in mind." Woodbridge remained with Mad for five decades. Later Mad editor John Ficarra noted, "He had a tremendous eye for detail that showed up in his drawings. We especially played to his history knowledge. When we gave him a piece on World War I, he would draw the exact gun and belt buckle they were using then."

Woodbridge illustrated several Mad books, such as Dick DeBartolo's A Mad Guide to Leisure Time and Mad's Cradle to Grave Primer (Warner Books, 1973), written by Larry Siegel and edited by Nick Meglin. When Bhob Stewart edited the Mad Style Guide in 1994, he gave Woodbridge the assignment of drawing the Mad Zeppelin from three different angles as a detailed guide for any company that might one day market a miniature model of the airship.

Woodbridge was color blind, yet he worked in color, as noted by cartoonist Sergio Aragonés, "He was such a good friend. He knew everything about history and he knew everything about artwork. When I was starting out and they gave me assignments that had to be in color, George was the one who helped me. Even though he was color blind, he did the most remarkable work in color. He was a wonderful man, and I will miss him very much."

Woodbridge told Mark Evanier (Mad Art): "I regard myself as an illustrator of historical subjects. When I'm not working for Mad, that's the field in which I work, though I'm damned proud to be part of Mad. I don't consider one field superior to the other and, in fact, the challenges are altogether different. In historical illustration, the goal is to be accurate. In Mad, the goal is to be funny." This included Woodbridge's brief stint as the artist for "Spy vs. Spy," the long-running Mad feature originally created and drawn by Cuban artist Antonio Prohias. Woodbridge illustrated just two installments, signing them as "Jorge Puente de Madera."

Woodbridge admitted, however, that his least-favorite subject was sports. This was Jack Davis' specialty; but during the time Davis wasn't available, that work went to Woodbridge and he struggled. "That subject seemed to come so naturally to Jack," Woodbridge said. "But I really had to sweat those jobs." However, Woodbridge's most famous article for Mad was about sports, albeit a stupid, fictitious one. [See below.]

== 43-Man Squamish ==
For Mad No. 95 (June 1965), he drew the sports satire "43-Man Squamish", prompting Ficarra to comment, "It's arguably our most requested piece to reprint. It struck a chord. Colleges all over formed teams and played this crazy game, with these ridiculous-looking helmets. George captured that lunacy." Written by Tom Koch, the absurdist article detailed the convoluted rules of an imaginary sport, and made enough of an impression to be mentioned in both men's New York Times obituaries, including the first sentence of Koch's.

In the article, new terminology is introduced with no explanation; much of the humor derives from the reader's half-successful attempts at gleaning a meaning from context. Exactly what everyone on the team is supposed to do, exactly what penalties apply, and exactly when or why the "yellow caution flag" is to be flown remains far from clear, even after repeated readings.

Although writer Koch intended the game to be completely unplayable, some colleges even attempted to form teams and play the game. The letters column to MAD #97 included several "team photos" and accounts from new acolytes of the sport. A student from Rensselaer Polytechnic Institute issued a public challenge to Harvard, while athletes from the University of Alberta exulted that "we happen to be the only undefeated Squamish team in Western Canada, mainly because we are the only team in Western Canada, and we haven't played a game. We can't understand why we have no opposition." A letter from the Athletic Committee of Marquette University reported that three of its Squamish players had been suspended for "sportsmanlike conduct."

== Death ==
Woodbridge died of emphysema at age 73, on January 20, 2004, in a Staten Island hospital. He was survived by his second wife, Deborah, and by his first wife Ines and their sons, George, Curtis (also a professional illustrator), and Christopher Woodbridge.
