= Dave Berg (cartoonist) =

American cartoonist (1920–2002)

- Self-portrait from the cover of Mad's Dave Berg Looks at You, 1982
- Born: June 12, 1920; Brooklyn, New York City, U.S.
- Died: May 17, 2002 (aged 81); Marina del Rey, California, U.S.
- Known for: Cartoonist
- Notable work: The Lighter Side of...
- Spouse: Vivian
- Children: 2

Dave Berg (June 12, 1920 – May 17, 2002) was an American cartoonist, most noted for his five decades of work in Mad of which The Lighter Side of... was the most famous.

== Early life ==
Berg showed early artistic talents, attending Pratt Institute when he was 12 years old, and later studying at Cooper Union. He served a period of time in the Army Air Forces. In 1940, he joined Will Eisner's studio, where he wrote and drew for the Quality Comics line. Berg's work also appeared in Dell Comics and Fawcett Publications, typically on humorous back-up features. Beginning in the mid-1940s, he worked for several years with Stan Lee on comic books at Timely Comics (now known as Marvel Comics), ranging from Combat Kelly and The Ringo Kid to Tessie the Typist. He also freelanced for a half-dozen other companies, including EC Comics. Berg retains notoriety as a contributing “good girl artist” during the 50s and 60s for such publications as editor Abe Goodman's Humorama, rendering attractive women using pinup stylings generally in the form of one-panel humorous gags. Berg's body of contributions during this period rank him alongside recognized contemporaries such as Bill Ward and Bill Wenzel. Beginning in 1983, he worked for a Jewish children's magazine, The Moshiach Times.

== Mad ==
Berg began at Mad in 1957, early in Al Feldstein's term as editor. Berg had distinct facial features and was heavyset, so inducing Feldstein to write, Physically, Dave looks like he kept his nose to the grindstone a little too long, and the rest of his body in the steam room not long enough. For four years, he provided satirical looks at areas such as boating, babysitting, and baseball. In 1961, he started the magazine's "Lighter Side" feature, his most famous creation. Berg would take an omnibus topic (such as "Noise," "Spectators" or "Dog Owners") and deliver approximately 15 short multi-panel cartoons on the subject. Beginning in #218 (October 1980), he abandoned the thematic approach, and thereafter covered multiple topics in each article. Berg often included caricatures of his own family—headed by his cranky hypochondriac alter ego, Roger Kaputnik—as well as of the Mad editorial staff. Occasionally he drew fellow artists, including Don Martin in #110 (April 1967) and Al Jaffee in #119 (June 1968).

His artistic style made Berg one of the more realistic Mad artists, although his characters managed to sport garish early-1970s wardrobes well into the 1990s. The art chores for a 1993 article, "The First Day of School 30 Years Ago and Today", were split between Berg and Rick Tulka, since Berg's old-fashioned appeal made him an ideal choice to depict the gentle nostalgia of 1963. The artist's lightweight gags and sometimes moralistic tone were roughly satirized by the National Lampoon's 1971 Mad parody, which included a hard-hatted conservative and a longhaired hippie finding their only common ground by choking and beating Berg. However, "The Lighter Side" had a long run as the magazine's most popular feature. Mad editor Nick Meglin often sketched layouts of "Lighter Side" panels. Sixteen original collections by Berg were published as paperbacks between 1964 and 1987.

Berg held an honorary doctorate in theology. He produced regular religious-themed work for Moshiach Times and the B'nai Brith newsletter. His interaction with Mad's atheist publisher Bill Gaines was suitably irreverent: Berg would tell Gaines, "God bless you," and Gaines would reply, "Go to Hell."

Fellow Mad contributor Al Jaffee described Berg's unique personality in 2009: "Dave had a messianic complex of some sort. He was battling ... he had good and evil inside of him, clashing all the time. It was sad, in a sense, because he wanted to be taken very seriously, and you know, the staffers at Mad just didn't take anything seriously. Most of all, ourselves ... It came out in a lot of the things he did. He had a very moralistic personality ... He wrote a book called My Friend God. And of course, if you write a book like that, you just know that the Mad staff is going to make fun of you. We would ask him questions like, "Dave, when did you and God become such good friends? Did you go to college together, or what?"

In this faith connection, Berg was additionally hired to contribute content to The Magazine For Jewish Children, The Moshiach Times, by Rabbi Dr. Dovid Sholom Pape. According to Pape: "He was a wonderful writer and humorist, and he had a great Jewish heart. I asked him to prepare a series of cartoons that would, in a humorous way, illustrate basic ideas in Torah. To do this, he invented a fat character called Schlemiel who would always misunderstand things, and then there would be a couple of boys who would correct him." In 2002, Berg told an interviewer, "There was a psychiatrist who filed my Lighter Sides in categories. When a patient would tell him their troubles, he would pull out one of my sequences and say, 'See, it happens to everyone.'"

His characters occasionally made their way into other artists' works, such as Kaputnik finding himself a patient in a Mort Drucker spoof of St. Elsewhere, tagged "with apologies to Dave Berg".

Berg contributed to Mad for 46 years until his death, appearing in 368 issues. His final hand-drawn strip appeared in Mad issue #423. His last set of "Lighter Side" strips, which had been written but not penciled, were illustrated after Berg's death by 18 of Mad's other artists as a final tribute; this affectionate send-off included the magazine's final new contributions from Jack Davis and George Woodbridge. This tribute appeared in Mad issue #427.

Between 2008 and 2017, Berg's old Lighter Side gags were given rewritten word balloons with inappropriately "un-Berg-like" humor by longtime Mad writer Dick DeBartolo and other staffers, while the art was unchanged. The twelve installments of this irregular feature were called "The Darker Side of the Lighter Side."

Berg's other work included the comic strips Citizen Senior (1989–93), Roger Kaputnik (1992) and Astronuts (1994).

== Death ==
After a long battle with cancer, he died in his home in Marina del Rey, California, shortly after midnight on May 17, 2002. Berg was survived by his wife of 52 years, Vivian, and their two children, Mitch and Nancy.

== Published works ==
Berg paperbacks
Year	Title	ISBN
1964	Mad's Dave Berg Looks at the U.S.A.	978-0-446-35422-6
1966	Mad's Dave Berg Looks at People	978-0-446-86132-8
1967	Mad's Dave Berg Looks at Things	978-0-446-94403-8
1969	Mad's Dave Berg Looks at Modern Thinking	978-0-446-30434-4
1971	Mad's Dave Berg Looks at Our Sick World	978-0-446-94404-5
1972	Mad's Dave Berg: My Friend God	978-0-451-06976-4
1973	Mad's Dave Berg Looks at Living	978-0-446-75697-6
1974	Mad's Dave Berg: Roger Kaputnik and God	978-0-451-06106-5
1975	Mad's Dave Berg Looks Around	978-0-446-30432-0
1977	Dave Berg: Mad Trash	978-0-446-87938-5
1977	Mad's Dave Berg Takes a Loving Look	978-0-446-88860-8
1979	Mad's Dave Berg Looks, Listens and Laughs	978-0-446-88667-3
1982	Mad's Dave Berg Looks at You	978-0-446-34792-1
1984	Mad's Dave Berg Looks at the Neighborhood	978-0-446-30350-7
1986	Mad's Dave Berg Looks at Our Planet	978-0-446-32310-9
1987	Mad's Dave Berg Looks at Today	978-0-446-34423-4

Berg hardcovers
Year	Title	ISBN
2013	Mad's Greatest Artists: Dave Berg: Five Decades of the Lighter Side Of...	9780762451616
