= Antonio Prohías =

Cuban cartoonist

- Born: January 17, 1921 Cienfuegos, Cuba
- Died: February 24, 1998 (aged 77) Miami, Florida
- Area: Cartoonist
- Notable works: Spy vs. Spy

Antonio Prohías (January 17, 1921 – February 24, 1998) was a Cuban-American cartoonist. He was the creator of the satirical comic strip Spy vs. Spy, which he illustrated for Mad magazine from 1961 to 1987.

== Biography ==
In 1946, Prohías was given the Juan Gualberto Gómez award, recognizing him as the foremost cartoonist in Cuba. By the late 1940s, Prohías had begun working at El Mundo, the most important newspaper in Cuba at the time. In January 1959, Prohías was the president of the Cuban Cartoonists Association; after Fidel Castro seized power, he personally honored the cartoonist for his anti-Batista political cartoons. But Prohías soon soured on Castro's actions of muzzling the press. When he drew cartoons to this effect, he was accused of working for the CIA by Fidel Castro's government. Consequently, he resigned from the newspaper in February 1959.

With his professional career in limbo, Prohías left Cuba for New York on May 1, 1960, working in a garment factory by day and building a cartoon portfolio for Mad by night. Ten weeks later, he walked into Mad's offices unannounced. He spoke no English, but his daughter Marta acted as an interpreter for him. Before he'd left, he had an $800 check and had sold his first three Spy vs. Spy cartoons to Mad. In late 1986, he sold his 241st and last Spy strip before retiring due to illness. Prohías also wrote and drew six paperback collections featuring the Spies. During an interview with the Miami Herald in 1983, Prohías gloated, "The sweetest revenge has been to turn Fidel's accusation of me as a spy into a moneymaking venture."

Two years after Prohías's debut in the magazine, cartoonist Sergio Aragonés made the trek from Mexico to New York in search of work. Because Aragonés's command of English was then shaky, he asked that Prohías be present to serve as an interpreter. According to Aragonés, this proved to be a mistake, since Prohías knew even less English than he did. When Prohías introduced the young artist to the Mad editors as "Sergio, my brother from Mexico," the Mad editors thought they were meeting "Sergio Prohías." Twelve years later, Mad writer Frank Jacobs reported that Prohías's conversational English was limited to "Hello" and "How are you, brother?" Said Aragonés, who speaks six languages, "Even I could not understand him that well." Al Jaffee joked, "Antonio is non-lingual!"

The Mad staff occasionally took group vacations, traveling en masse to other countries. Prohías took part in these vacations when possible, but as a Cuban exile, he had trouble gaining admission into some countries. At the airport before a Mad vacation to Italy, an airport official said, "You can leave if you want, but you can never come back." He later presented a drawing to MAD publisher William M. Gaines which showed himself being blocked by angry airport officials, letting his heart fly over their heads to the rest of the MAD gang. A note at the bottom translates to: "Mr. Gaines, my heart will always travel with you."

Although he is most famous for Spy vs. Spy, the majority of his comic strips, such as El Hombre Siniestro, La Mujer Siniestra, and Tovarich, were published mostly or only in Cuba. Altogether, only about 20 of his roughly 270 contributions to Mad were of subjects and gags other than his spy series. Most of the available information on Prohías's other work can be seen in the Spy Vs Spy Complete Casebook (Watson-Guptill, 2001) and the Spy vs. Spy Omnibus (DC Comics, 2011).

He died of lung cancer, aged 77, and was buried in Woodlawn Park Cemetery and Mausoleum (now Caballero Rivero Woodlawn North Park Cemetery and Mausoleum) in Miami, Florida.

== Characters other than Spy vs. Spy ==
- El Hombre Siniestro: (The Sinister Man) wore a wide-brimmed hat and overcoat and had a long pointed nose, becoming the prototype for the Spies. His description from the Spy Vs Spy Complete Casebook says it best: "A dark and dastardly character, El Hombre Siniestro thought nothing of chopping the tails off of dogs, or even the legs off of little girls. . . [he] was born out of the national psychosis of the Cuban people." At the time right after Castro rose to power, there was a pronounced feeling of fatality and sinisterness in Cuba, and Prohías depicted this through his twisted El Hombre Siniestro strip. He and La Mujer Siniestra can be easily compared to the Spies—although, instead of fighting against a set rival, they simply do horrible things to anyone they can find. El Hombre Siniestro debuted in Bohemia in 1956, although in later years Prohías created new strips for Zig-Zag Libre after he moved to Miami.
- La Mujer Siniestra: (The Sinister Woman) Like her counterpart, La Mujer Siniestra is about the titular character causing misery for everyone else. However, unlike El Hombre Siniestro's mostly unrelated crimes, many of her strips involve either her attempt to find love (like, for example, cuckolding someone else's lover) or to ruin other women.
- Tovarich: Tovarishch is Russian for "comrade," and so Tovarich was meant to be both a representation of the Communist Soviet government and of Fidel Castro. He is a corrupt Soviet dictator meant to parody Fidel. However, since Castro had not yet announced he was a Communist, nobody could complain about the comic. Since the setting was Russia and not Cuba, it could not be explicitly found as criticism. When his Communist colleagues complained, he would reply, "What? What's wrong with it? It's not about Cuba, it's about Russia." Tovarich's appearance changed through the years; originally he wore a military cap with a star and had longer hair, but in the "funeral for Agapito" picture in the Complete Casebook, he wears a typical Russian ushanka (round rabbit fur hat) with a hammer and sickle on it. Tovarich first appeared in Prensa Libre in 1959, with a sampling of strips shown in the "Nyets to You Department" in MAD #68 of January 1962. Like the Sinister Man and Woman, he was usually up to nasty tricks and getting away with them: in one strip, drawn at the height of the Cold War, he offers the hand of friendship to Uncle Sam; Uncle Sam is delighted and takes it, unaware that he is shaking the hand of a dummy while the real Tovarich is literally about to stab him in the back. Another such cartoon showed the materialism of the Politburo while denouncing the materialism of everyone else and preventing native people from acquiring wealth: A man is envisioning himself driving a luxury car, to which Tovarich dunks his head in ice water, from which the man emerges comatose and now only thinking of the hammer and sickle, supposedly now an obedient Communist who knows better than to think of acquiring wealth for himself. The man is then ordered to be a driver, where he is then shown chauffeuring Tovarich in a luxury car, who is smugly smoking a cigar.
- The Diplomat: An extremely minor character, but noteworthy for the fact that he had his own small feature of comic strips in MAD's Big Book of Spy vs Spy Capers and Other Surprises (Warner Books, 1982) and appeared in the MADtv "Spy vs. Spy" short, "Defection". He also appeared in the Fall 1970 Special, in a group of strips that might be said to bear a slight resemblance to Otto Soglow's more benign The Little King. He wears a waistcoat, black jacket with coattails, a medal and a top hat, and also sports a long, pointed nose somewhat similar to that of the Spies.
- Erizo: A character who appears in the "funeral" picture in the Complete Casebook, although nothing about him or his comic is explained. He debuted in the magazine Carteles in 1948. Some comic pages can be found online.
- Oveja Negra: Also known as Black Sheep. A young boy wearing a propeller beanie, T-shirt and shorts. He appears in some of the artwork for the Complete Casebook, including the "funeral" picture. (It's worth noting that, in the aforementioned funeral picture, Oveja Negra is the only one who appears to be mourning.) He debuted in Informacion in 1949.
- Anti-Communist and Anti-Castro cartoons: Featured in The Complete Spy vs. Spy Casebook, shows arguably Prohías' most serious cartoons, such as depicting Castro as a mermaid singing a siren song to lure sailors to their deaths, or a skeleton having difficulty eating meals with the caption "Gentlemen, it is very difficult to eat with a hammer and sickle!"

== Other items published in Mad ==
- "One-Shot Dept.: Vengeance" (#66, October 1961, p. 13)

A caveman kills another caveman with an arrow to the head. The dead body nourishes the living arrow, which grows into a tree. In the modern day, a motorist who resembles the first caveman crashes into the tree.

- "Follow Through Dept.: More Than Meets the Eye!" (also #66, pp. 33–34)

Four comic strips, each three panels, are printed so that the middle panel, which explains the outcome, can be seen only by holding the page up to the light.

- Issue #101 (March 1966, front cover)

Prohías came up with the gag for the cover painting by Norman Mingo of Alfred E. Neuman reading Shakespeare in class, hidden behind a copy of this issue of MAD (rather than vice versa). However, in Mad Cover to Cover, Sergio Aragonés is credited with the gag.

- "Flowery Language Dept.: A Portfolio of MAD Blooming Idiosyncrasies" (#115, December 1967, pp. 28–30)

Various human conditions and emotions personified by flowers.

- "The Artist" (#138, October 1970, back cover; reprinted in Fall '85 Special and XL #2, in which Prohías was the artist of the issue)

An artist sets up a picture frame around a beautiful landscape, runs a knife along the edge of the frame, and then walks away with a framed picture of the landscape, leaving a gaping hole in the spot where the land used to be.

- "Split Personalities Dept.: The Irony of Fate" (Spring '71 Special, pp. 11–13)

Ten two-panel tales of star-crossed lovers; for example, two babies who love each other, being carried by storks, are dropped off separately in West and East Berlin. Two eggs are also lovers until they hatch, as one is a bird and the other a bird-eating snake.

- "The Tourist" (#150, April 1972, inside front cover)

A man is persuaded by a window display to sign up for a cruise, and then finds that the "cruise" is just a fake cardboard setup like the window display.

- "Finders, Weepers Dept.: The Treasure Map" (#159, June 1973. p. 19)

A collector discovers a treasure map hidden in the dug-out pages of an old book, travels to a hazardous jungle to find the treasure, and then finds that the treasure is simply the pages dug out of the book.

- "Fortune Kookie Dept.: The Old Ball Game" (#161, September 1973, p. 42)

A man visits a fortune teller, whose crystal ball sees him behind bars; but he is a police officer who puts her in jail for fraud. Later, she sees him on the other side of the bars in the same way it was shown in the crystal ball.

- "Broom Shtick Dept.: A Witch's Tale" (#163, December 1973, p. 33)

A witch gets a new broom for her birthday and throws away her old broom. The old broomstick is used to make toothpicks, and restaurant customers who use the toothpicks have their teeth fly away.

- "Scotched on the Rocks Dept.: The Photo Contest" (Winter '73 Special, p. 9)

A man fakes a photo of the Loch Ness Monster to enter in a contest, and then finds that the winning photo shows the real monster behind him as he is taking his fake photo.

- "Grin and Bearer Dept.: On a Safari" (#167, June 1974, pp. 29–30)

An explorer in Africa captures a giraffe, his guides standing on each other's shoulders to transport it in a cage.

- "MAD Artists' Response to an Article: Draw This Figure" (#178, October 1975, pp. 2–3)

In place of the usual letters page, and in a parody of the typical art school advertisement, 12 MAD artists contribute their renditions of a horse, Prohías drawing it as a pair of chess knights portrayed by the spies glaring at each other.

- "Shell-Shock Dept.: The Pearl" (Fall '75 Special, pp. 11–12)

An oyster travels through the hands of several people, the last finally opening it and finding an advertisement for a pearl shop.

- "Don Martin Dept.: One Special Day in the Dungeon" (#277, March 1988, p. 45)

Prohías came up with a prison birthday cake gag for the last strip Don Martin drew for MAD.

- "Quick Draw Guffaw Dept.: Play Pictionary with the MAD Artists" (#284, January 1989, pp. 14–15)

Given the theme "Gluttony," Prohías contributes a quickly-drawn panel of the two spies dining on a pig with a bomb in its mouth.

- "National Business Machines" (Super Special March 1996, p. 25)

In a never-before-published older strip, a man enters a showroom, sees demonstrations of various models of a product, and makes a purchase; but rather than buying the product, he buys one of product demonstrators, who is revealed to be a robot.
