= John Ficarra =

American publishing figure

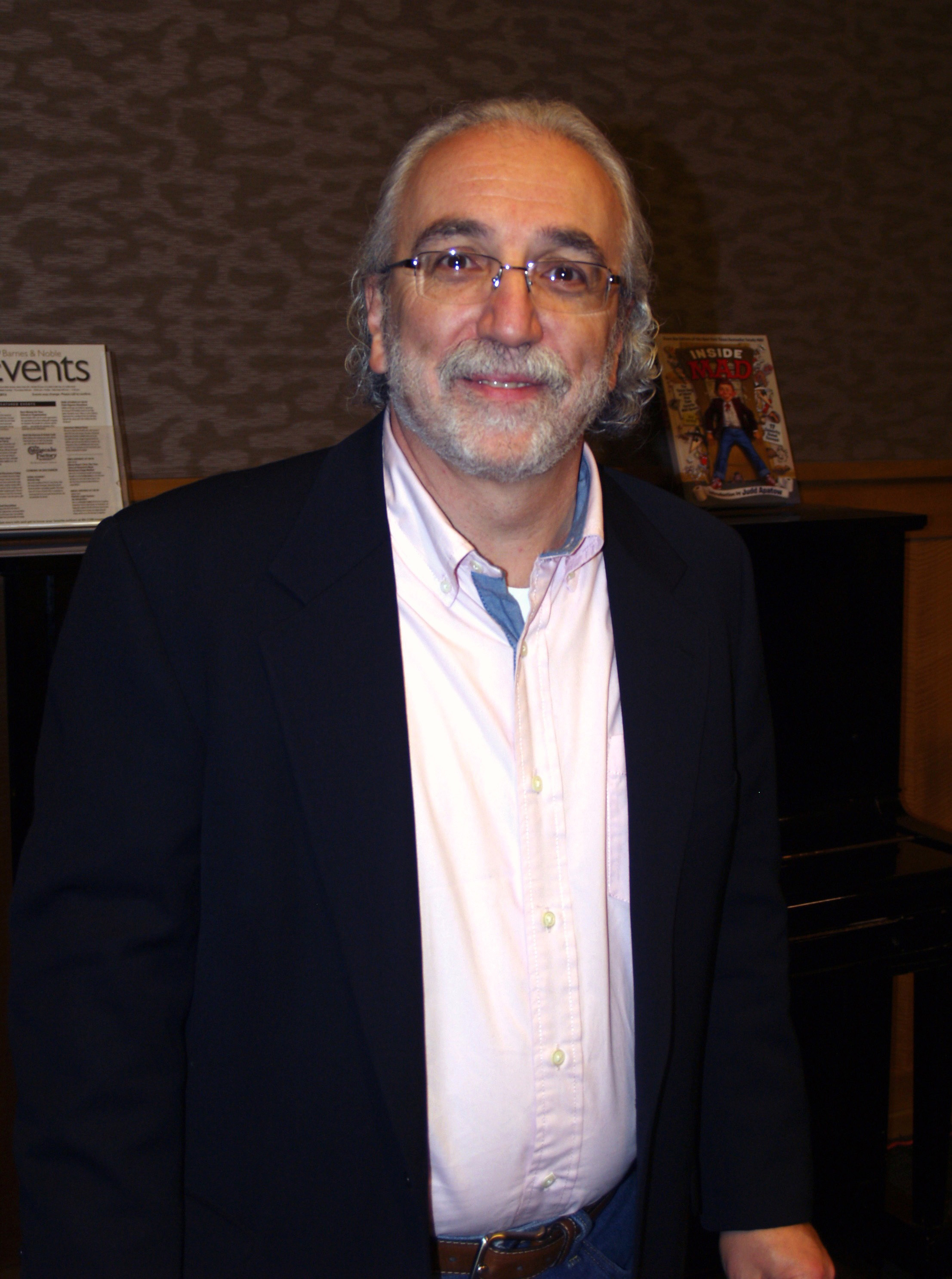
- Ficarra at a signing for Inside Mad at a Barnes & Noble in Manhattan
- Areas: Editor, Publisher
- Notable works: Mad magazine

John Ficarra (born ca. 1956) is an American publishing figure. He was hired as assistant editor of the American satire magazine Mad in 1980, shortly after his debut as a contributing writer. He became editor-in-chief (a position he shared with Nick Meglin until 2004) in 1985, when the incumbent (Al Feldstein) retired, to 2018.

== As editor of Mad ==
Dave Berg often drew Ficarra along with other Mad staff members in an office setting from the late 1980s until 2002; Ficarra was depicted as a bespectacled young man with curly dark hair and beard.

In March 2013 Ficarra was interviewed by Film Society of Lincoln Center, to explain how Mad created its annual movie-parody issue.

In a July 2014 interview with Nerd Reactor, Ficarra explained the changes being made to Mad in an effort to make it more relevant to the 21st century.

In August 2014 Ficarra participated in a Warner Brothers interview to explain the creative process at Mad.

In response to the 2015 attack on the French satirical magazine Charlie Hebdo, on January 11, 2015, Ficarra made a personal appearance on the US television show CBS Sunday Morning, to describe the chilling effect which such attacks were having on the previous freedom of expression enjoyed by cartoonists in the Free World.

In December 2015 Ficarra was interviewed by MStars News for an article detailing how the magazine created its annual "20 Dumbest People, Events & Things of 20xx" issue.

Ficarra retired with issue #550 (dated April 2018) after 34 years as the editor of Mad magazine. #550 was also the final issue of the first volume of the magazine which launched at EC Comics in 1952 before being taken over by DC after EC ceased publication in the mid-'50s. Mad magazine was rebooted with a new #1 dated June 2018 and a new look, with illustrator and comic book artist Bill Morrison taking over as the new editor and the magazine shifting offices to Los Angeles, California after decades in Manhattan (first on Madison Avenue and then on Broadway).
