= Mad TV season 3 =

Season of television series

Mad TV
- Season 3
- DVD cover
- No. of episodes: 25

Release
- Original network: Fox
- Original release: September 20, 1997 – May 16, 1998

Season chronology
- ← Previous; Season 2 Next → Season 4

The third season of Mad TV, an American sketch comedy series, originally aired in the United States on the Fox Network between September 20, 1997, and May 16, 1998.

== Season summary ==
At the start of season three, one fourth of the original cast (Bryan Callen, Orlando Jones and Artie Lange [who left midway through season 2 due to his cocaine addiction] and featured player Pablo Francisco) was replaced by newcomers Alex Borstein (who would later do voicework and writing work on FOX's Family Guy and have a supporting role on The Marvelous Mrs. Maisel), Chris Hogan, Pat Kilbane, Lisa Kushell, Will Sasso, and Aries Spears.

This was the last season to feature original cast members David Herman (who went on to do voice acting work and appear in such Mike Judge projects as King of the Hill, Office Space, and Idiocracy), Craig Anton, and Mary Scheer (who quit show business temporarily to be a full-time mother). It was also the second and last season for Tim Conlon, in addition to being the only season for Chris Hogan and Lisa Kushell.

This was also the last season Fax Bahr and Adam Small would produce Mad TV with Quincy Jones and David Salzman, although Barr and Small are still credited as "executive consultants". They went on to create Blue Collar TV, a similar sketch show that ran from 2004 to 2006 on the WB.

This was the last season Alfred E. Neuman and the bomb sequence was seen in the opening credits. However, Neuman's image still appeared on the Mad TV stage in the fourth season. There were reruns of Spy vs. Spy and Don Martin cartoon shorts in this season as well as the fourth and fifth seasons since the last episodes starring them in new segments were in the second season.

This was the first season in which Mad TV showed "classics", i.e. reruns of sketches from previous seasons.

This was also the final season to feature a guest host for each episode.

== Opening montage ==
The title sequence begins with several fingers pointing at a bomb. Then the bomb explodes and a picture of Alfred E. Neuman and a brain appears on a purple screen followed by the Mad TV logo. The theme song, which is performed by the hip-hop group Heavy D & the Boyz, begins. Cast members are introduced alphabetically with their names appearing in caption over black-and-white still photos of them. When the last cast member is introduced, the music stops and the title sequence ends with the phrase "You are now watching Mad TV."

== Cast ==
Repertory cast members

- Alex Borstein* (20/25 episodes)
- David Herman (4/25 episodes; last episode: November 1, 1997)
- Chris Hogan * (23/25 episodes)
- Pat Kilbane * (23/25 episodes)
- Lisa Kushell* (22/25 episodes)
- Phil LaMarr (25/25 episodes)
- Will Sasso (25/25 episodes)
- Mary Scheer (16/25 episodes)
- Aries Spears (24/25 episodes)
- Nicole Sullivan (25/25 episodes)
- Debra Wilson (25/25 episodes)

Featured cast members

- Craig Anton (8/25 episodes; last episode: December 13, 1997)
- Tim Conlon (3/25 episodes; last episode: March 28, 1998)

* Performer was a featured cast member at the start of the season but was promoted to repertory status mid-season.

== Writers ==
- Fax Bahr (eps. 1–25)
- Garry Campbell (eps. 1–25)
- Blaine Capatch (eps. 1–25)
- Lauren Dombrowski (eps. 1–25)
- Chris Finn (eps. 20, 25)
- Spencer Green (eps. 1–25)
- Brian Hartt (writing supervisor) (eps. 1–25)
- Jordan Hawley (ep. 23) (Season 01 Encore)
- Torian Hughes (eps. 7, 12–25)
- Scott King (eps. 1–25)
- Lanier Laney (eps. 1–25)
- Patton Oswalt (ep. 18) (Season 02 Encore)
- Aaron Michael Peters (eps. 8, 17, 22)
- Wiley Roberts (eps. 1–11)
- David Rotman (eps. 9, 15)
- Michael Short (creative consultant) (eps. 1–25)
- Adam Small (eps. 1–25)
- Nicole Sullivan (ep. 13)
- Terry Sweeney (eps. 1–25)
- Mary Elizabeth Williams (eps. 1–11, 13–25)

== Episodes ==
No. overall	No. in season	Guest(s)	Original release date
42	1	Sandra Bernhard (host) and Jalen Rose (special guest)	September 20, 1997
A senile old man named Gus (David Herman) hosts a Howard Stern-like radio show; Sandra Bernhard opens and closes the show with a song; Michael Jackson (Phil LaMarr) joins the corps in a parody of G.I. Jane with Sean Connery (Pat Kilbane) and Janet Reno (Alex Borstein); a husband and wife (Aries Spears, Debra Wilson) promote New Cholestra (Now with 10% Less Anal Leakage); the Vancome Lady (Nicole Sullivan) refuses to rescue the survivors (Lisa Kushell, Phil LaMarr, Will Sasso, Debra Wilson) of a plane crash; Sandra Bernhard holds an ad for her new superstar kit; Martin Luther King, Jr. (Aries Spears) tries the Def Comedy Jam circuit; a new basketball franchise, The NB-T-N-A, adds sex appeal to sports with scantily-clad female players (Lisa Kushell, Debra Wilson); a David Copperfield-like magician (Craig Anton) puts on a magic show for the audience. Notes: Will Sasso and Aries Spears' first episode as cast members. Alex Borstein, Chris Hogan, Pat Kilbane, and Lisa Kushell's first episode as featured cast members.
43	2	Carmen Electra (host) and Salt-N-Pepa (special guest)	September 27, 1997
A semi-nude band (Pat Kilbane, Will Sasso, Aries Spears) performs a song about Marv Albert backstage for Nicole Sullivan and Debra Wilson; Carmen Electra interrupts a monologue by Fiona Apple (Lisa Kushell); Joel Schumacher (David Herman) directs the fifth Batman installment as a musical with Tommy Tune (Pat Kilbane), Ben Vereen (Phil LaMarr), and Liza Minnelli (Will Sasso); Mike Tyson (voice of Aries Spears) and Don King (voice of Phil LaMarr) appear in a parody of the claymation Brisk commercials; Salt N Pepa appear on Cabana Chat, where Dixie Wetsworth (Mary Scheer) introduces her new co-host, James Brown, Jr. (Aries Spears), and holds auditions for a new Pool Boy; a bride (Carmen Electra) has a talk with her mother (Lisa Kushell) before she gets married; a recovering coffee addict named Stan (Pat Kilbane) finds himself wired on the beverage again; Rick (Phil LaMarr) tries to hit on Salt N Pepa; an advertisement for Flimstone Chewable Birth Control Pills; a parody of Sabrina, the Teenage Witch portrays the protagonist (Mary Scheer) as a young mother-to-be instead of an adolescent sorceress; Carmen Electra shows us the difference between her and Will Sasso. Absent: Alex Borstein, Chris Hogan
44	3	Corky and the Juice Pigs (musical guests)	October 4, 1997
Darlene McBride (Nicole Sullivan) sings racist songs on her new CD; Aries Spears opens the show; a sequel to the movie Liar Liar shows President Bill Clinton (Will Sasso) telling the truth to please his daughter Chelsea (Alex Borstein); Corky and the Juice Pigs perform "REMember" and "Burn Victim Girl"; new crime drama stars comedian and Saturday Night Live alumnus Dennis Miller (Craig Anton) as a police negotiator; Prince (Phil LaMarr) is repulsed by the Klumps' (Aries Spears) disgusting dinner conversation; on The Rosie O'Donnell Show, Rosie O'Donnell (Alex Borstein) interviews Oprah Winfrey (Debra Wilson) and plugs her new Lifetime movie co-starring Tom Cruise (Chris Hogan); Milton Cladwell (Chris Hogan) has so much trouble managing his quarterlies that he eventually finds himself in trouble during a commercial; on COPS in Hollywood, police officers (Craig Anton, Chris Hogan, Debra Wilson) arrest celebrities including former SNL cast members Eddie Murphy (Aries Spears) and Chris Farley (Will Sasso) and talk show host Rosie O'Donnell (Alex Borstein). Absent: David Herman, Pat Kilbane, Lisa Kushell, Mary Scheer
45	4	Jennifer Love Hewitt and Daisy Fuentes (special guests)	October 11, 1997
The News at 6 team (Alex Borstein, Chris Hogan, Phil LaMarr, Nicole Sullivan) reports on a deadly windstorm; Chris Hogan opens the show; reprising his role as Karl Childers from Sling Blade, Billy Bob Thornton (Pat Kilbane) must save the world from aliens with the help of John Ritter (David Herman) and Jennifer Aniston (Nicole Sullivan) in Sling Blade II: The Reckoning; Ms. Swan (Alex Borstein) is the only eyewitness to a robbery, but her irritating catchphrase ("He looka like a man.") infuriates a rookie cop (Chris Hogan); two smugglers (Craig Anton, Pat Kilbane) hiding objects in their rear ends get caught by U. S. Treasury agents (Phil LaMarr, Will Sasso); Antonia (Nicole Sullivan) isn't very good at word association; the Spishak salesman (Craig Anton) promotes a not-so-good soft drink; Jennifer Love Hewitt shows us the difference between her and Will Sasso; Daisy Fuentes promotes a new meal called Lean Bulime; UBS guy Jaq (Phil LaMarr) becomes part of a strike; on Funky Walker, Dirty Talker, Jennifer Love Hewitt shows a clip from her latest film I Know What You Did Last Summer. Absent: Mary Scheer, Aries Spears
46	5	TBA	October 25, 1997
A sitcom features a long-running theme song; Pat Kilbane opens the show; Michael Jackson (Phil LaMarr) gets some advice from his past self (Aries Spears); Antonia (Nicole Sullivan) and James Brown, Jr. (Aries Spears) appear as eligible singles on Lowered Expectations; the two later star as bank robbers in the movie, Antonia and James; Charlie Newall (Will Sasso) disciplines bratty children (Pat Kilbane, Lisa Kushell); director Spike Lee (Phil LaMarr) appears on Talkin' American; a claymation parody of Jerry Lewis telethons; a couple (Phil LaMarr, Debra Wilson) get poor service from an obnoxious waitress (Lisa Kushell); Stan the Coffee Guy (Pat Kilbane) causes havoc during a tour of the Dolgers coffee plant; a sassy stay-at-home mother (Debra Wilson) hosts her own morning talk show. Note: While David Herman doesn't physically appear in this episode, he does provide the voice for Jerry Clavin. Absent: Alex Borstein, David Herman, Mary Scheer
47	6	Bret Hart (special guest) Corky and the Juice Pigs (musical guests)	November 1, 1997
Farrah Fawcett (Lisa Kushell) uses her erratic body movements to paint houses; Debra Wilson opens the show; Bill (Will Sasso) and Hillary Clinton (Nicole Sullivan) discuss their scandals during a town meeting; Corky and the Juice Pigs perform "Dolphin Boy;" in a parody of Leaving Las Vegas, Nicolas Cage (David Herman) portrays Superman's bout with alcoholism; Barry White (Phil LaMarr) uses his powerful singing voice to save a dying child (Craig Anton); a nerdy kid (Chris Hogan) hires wrestler Bret Hart to help him stand up to his bullying family (Alex Borstein, Will Sasso, Nicole Sullivan); Craig Anton lets loose another screaming towel-clad monologue; a man (Craig Anton) overhears another man (Will Sasso) trying to potty train his son in a bathroom stall; Bill Cosby (Aries Spears) appears in trial bloopers; a musical duo (Craig Anton, Will Sasso) have a fallout onstage. Note: David Herman's last episode as a cast member. Absent: Mary Scheer
48	7	TBA	November 8, 1997
Kenny Rogers (Will Sasso) promotes his new restaurant; Will Sasso opens the show; in a parody of I Love Lucy, Lucy (Nicole Sullivan) and Ethel (Alex Borstein) sell cocaine for a menacing drug dealer (Aries Spears); Eddie Murphy (Aries Spears) and Rui Peranio (Will Sasso) are bachelors on Lowered Expectations; an 80-year old man (Chris Hogan) stars in a porno film; the Eracists (Alex Borstein, Phil LaMarr, Will Sasso, Nicole Sullivan) sing songs promoting racial tolerance, much to the chagrin of an African-American couple (Aries Spears, Debra Wilson); the Vancome Lady (Nicole Sullivan) serves jury duty; Michael Eisner (Pat Kilbane) presents an animated parody of Toy Story called Sex Toy Story (rerun from Episode 203); Ms. Swan (Alex Borstein) takes an overly long time to identify who robbed her store; LL Cool J (Aries Spears) hosts an urban parody of Pyramid with Vanilla Ice (Pat Kilbane) and Sidney Poitier (Phil LaMarr) as contestants. Absent: Lisa Kushell, Mary Scheer
49	8	Daisy Fuentes (special guest), Gilbert Gottfried (special guest)	November 15, 1997
Spishak promotes a Super Soaker rigged to impregnate women; Alex Borstein opens the show; the hosts of Talkin' American (Aries Spears, Will Sasso) interview Howard Stern (Pat Kilbane); two hopelessly romantic guys (Chris Hogan, Pat Kilbane) use Tupac Shakur's (Phil LaMarr) dead corpse to attract girls in a parody of Weekend at Bernie's; a hot dog vendor (Chris Hogan) at Disney World finds himself waking up in a bed with a Belle impersonator (Lisa Kushell) in a parody of The Twilight Zone; Daisy Fuentes promotes a new line of food for bulimics in a commercial parody; Elton John (Will Sasso) performs funeral songs; Buffy Summers (Nicole Sullivan) fights evil umpires (Will Sasso, Aries Spears) in a parody of Buffy the Vampire Slayer; comedian and former SNL cast member Gilbert Gottfried is a guest on Funky Walker, Dirty Talker; a cavalcade of stars (Pat Kilbane, Lisa Kushell, Phil LaMarr, Aries Spears, Nicole Sullivan) appear in a parody of Walker, Texas Ranger; an employee (Debra Wilson) can't conceal that she was intimate with her boss (Phil LaMarr). Absent: Mary Scheer
50	9	Kerri Strug (special guest), Corky and the Juice Pigs (musical guests)	November 22, 1997
Bill Clinton (Will Sasso) has terrible gas while making an announcement; Phil LaMarr opens the show; the News at 6 team (Alex Borstein, Chris Hogan, Phil LaMarr, Nicole Sullivan) reports on a blackout; the Clops arrest Mr. Potato Head, Wallace & Gromit, and Mr. Peanut; a family (Pat Kilbane, Lisa Kushell, Nicole Sullivan) has a phone conversation rife with sexual double-entendres over pie; Stan the Coffee Guy (Pat Kilbane) is a bachelor on Lowered Expectations; Corky and the Juice Pigs perform "Pandas/Enviro Girl;" Darlene McBride (Nicole Sullivan) tours middle America and the South; UBS guy Jaq (Phil LaMarr) tries recording a message for his answering machine; a fast food employee (Debra Wilson) tries to memorize a customer's (Phil LaMarr) lengthy order; Kerri Strug shows us the difference between her and Will Sasso; a can of corn is the sidekick of a hardened cop (Phil LaMarr) in a new crime drama. Absent: Mary Scheer
51	10	Don Most (special guest)	December 6, 1997
Suppositories now come loaded with nutrients in a commercial parody; Chris Hogan opens the show; Don Most appears in a parody of The Love Boat filled with Titanic references; Ms. Swan (Alex Borstein) is a single woman on Lowered Expectations; Chelsea Clinton (Alex Borstein) uses her father's Secret Service agents (Chris Hogan, Phil LaMarr, Will Sasso) to cheat her way through college and bully her roommates (Lisa Kushell, Aries Spears, Debra Wilson); Big John (Will Sasso) and his wife, Thelma (Debra Wilson), promote their new shirt store; a woman (Nicole Sullivan) teaches her friend (Debra Wilson) unorthodox ways to be attractive; a lone spaceman (Phil LaMarr) lands on a planet run by the Vancome Lady (Nicole Sullivan) in a parody of Planet of the Apes; the Parker sisters (Chris Hogan, Lisa Kushell) go nuts at a bar; UBS deliveryman Jaq (Phil LaMarr) discovers a couple (Chris Hogan, Debra Wilson) having sex during a Christmas party. Absent: Mary Scheer
52	11	Howie Long (special guest) Corky and the Juice Pigs (musical guests)	December 13, 1997
The cast invites the audience to join them for a Christmas get-together, only for various misfortunes to occur throughout the show; a commercial parody for politically correct G.I. Joe action figures such as G.I. Jew, G.I. Junkie, and G.I. Janitor appear throughout the show; James Brown, Jr. (Aries Spears) reads Twas the Night Before Christmas; Howie Long appears on Cabana Chat; Larry Flynt (Will Sasso) stops by to drop off gifts for the cast; Rudolph the Red-Nosed Reindeer (voice of Pat Kilbane) appears in a parody of Apocalypse Now; Corky and the Juice Pigs perform "Christmas Dreams" and "Omen;" the Klumps (Aries Spears) welcome Arnold Schwarzenegger (Pat Kilbane) to their Christmas dinner; the Mexican Wrestling Federation (Chris Hogan, Will Sasso, Aries Spears) perform a stage version of Miracle on 34th Street; Antonia (Nicole Sullivan) makes a Christmas wish to Santa Claus (Phil LaMarr). Notes: Craig Anton's last episode as a featured cast member.
53	12	Pam Grier (host) and Corky and the Juice Pigs (musical guests)	January 3, 1998
McRonald's promotes a new Happy Meal based on Titanic; Pam Grier opens the show; Ms. Swan (Alex Borstein) is interrogated by Mulder (Chris Hogan) and Scully (Mary Scheer) in a parody of X-Files; Barbara Walters (Nicole Sullivan) and Hugh Downs (Chris Hogan) get violet on an extreme edition of 20/20; Pam Grier is a guest on Cabana Chat and appears in a sketch with an all-black superhero league (Phil LaMarr, Aries Spears, Debra Wilson); the Roadkill Lunchmeat Megapress turns dead animals into nutritious meals; Corky and the Juice Pigs perform "Phone Sex Girls;" singles on Lowered Expectations include Susan Whitfield (Lisa Kushell) and chain-smoker Jewel Barone (Mary Scheer); Whitfield (Lisa Kushell) later hosts her own talk show; sportscasters (Chris Hogan, Will Sasso, Aries Spears) are hard to understand because of their overwhelming use of slang.
54	13	La Toya Jackson (special guest)	January 10, 1998
A commercial for a talking doll (voice of Debra Wilson) that needs its owner (Lisa Kushell) 24/7; the same doll appears on Lowered Expectations with the Parker sisters (Chris Hogan, Lisa Kushell) and drug-addicted porno director Harvey Lachien (Aries Spears); Nicole Sullivan declares her love for Steve Young in an opening monologue; the News at 6 team (Alex Borstein, Chris Hogan, Phil LaMarr, Nicole Sullivan) reports on a cold-and-flu season; La Toya Jackson appears on The Tonight Show with Jay Leno to dispel rumors about her family (Phil LaMarr, Aries Spears, Debra Wilson) and beat up Jay Leno (Pat Kilbane); a bickering couple (Pat Kilbane, Nicole Sullivan) walk into their surprise anniversary party; Farrah Fawcett (Lisa Kushell) and Louis Farrakhan (Phil LaMarr) debate one other; Chris Rock (Phil LaMarr) stars in a remake of Guess Who's Coming to Dinner; a sketch about two guys (Chris Hogan, Phil LaMarr) hoping their dates (Mary Scheer, Debra Wilson) will make out after watching Ellen turns into a PSA presented by Jerry Falwell (Will Sasso); a couple (Will Sasso, Nicole Sullivan) has an argument while driving home because the husband isn't listening; two doctors (Chris Hogan, Debra Wilson) uncover surprising findings while performing an autopsy; the Apocalypse is broadcast on the radio.
55	14	Tony Little, Ahmet Zappa, Dweezil Zappa	January 17, 1998
Billy Dee Williams (Aries Spears) promotes a new erotic massage parlor in character as Star Wars' Lando Calrissian; Lisa Kushell opens the show; Rosie O'Donnell (Alex Borstein) interviews Barbra Streisand (Mary Scheer), who shows off her sex tape with James Brolin (Pat Kilbane); the Vancome Lady (Nicole Sullivan) works as a high school guidance counselor; a new courtroom drama centers on an overly emotional lawyer (Debra Wilson); a depressed fitness guru (Nicole Sullivan) hosts her own show and makes guest star Tony Little just as depressed; Fiona Apple (Lisa Kushell) unveils her new music video; a man in a dinosaur suit (Pat Kilbane) terrorizes a girl's (Lisa Kushell) birthday party; a PSA features a woman (Debra Wilson) ramming spikes into other people's (Pat Kilbane, Phil LaMarr, Will Sasso) heads to read their minds; Tony Little promotes Drowsamine; Dweezil and Ahmet Zappa appear in a skit about hostile tourists in Germany.
56	15	TBA	January 31, 1998
The Kenneth Starr newspaper has all the news for people interested in the Clinton sex scandal; Pat Kilbane opens the show; the Spice Girls (Lisa Kushell, Nicole Sullivan, Debra Wilson) run for their lives in The Great American Spice Girl Hunt; the Eracists (Alex Borstein, Phil LaMarr, Will Sasso, Nicole Sullivan) are given the task to stop a Neo-Nazi Rally; Sigourney Weaver (voice of Mary Scheer) stars as Jesus in the animated film Claylien Resurrection; Stan the Coffee Guy (Pat Kilbane) goes to the doctor's (Mary Scheer) for an exam; Catwoman (Debra Wilson) sends her goons to attack her neighbor (Phil LaMarr) who wants to get his rake back; Antonia (Nicole Sullivan) works at a suicide hotline service; Lida (Nicole Sullivan) and Melina (Debra Wilson) get held up by an amateur robber (Chris Hogan) at the Evangelista's Market; accountant Milton Cladwell (Chris Hogan) and singer Savante (Phil LaMarr) visit a school for Career Day; the Mexican Wrestling Federation (Chris Hogan, Will Sasso, Aries Spears) perform a stage version of To Kill a Mockingbird.
57	16	Mark Hamill (special guest) and Corky and the Juice Pigs (musical guests)	February 7, 1998
Woodworker Paul Timberman (Will Sasso) has some bloody mishaps while trying to build a curio cabinet; Will Sasso and Chris Hogan both open the show; Bob Saget (Pat Kilbane), John Stamos (Chris Hogan), Lori Loughlin (Lisa Kushell), and the Olsen Twins (Mary Scheer, Nicole Sullivan) come together for a Full House reunion; a man (Aries Spears) has an allergic reaction to Spishak's new margarine; David Duchovny (Chris Hogan) re-enacts famous movie scenes live; Corky and the Juice Pigs perform "Hot Squat Hombre" and "Skateboard"; Mark Hamill is a guest on Funky Walker, Dirty Talker; Darlene McBride (Nicole Sullivan) promotes her new Valentine's Day album; a cult leader (Pat Kilbane) reveals that he has relationship problems to his fellow cult members (Lisa Kushell, Phil LaMarr, Will Sasso); Alanis Morissette (Lisa Kushell) is a guest on Talkin' American; a couple (Phil LaMarr, Mary Scheer) show their friends (Will Sasso, Nicole Sullivan) their home movies; two custodians (Aries Spears, Debra Wilson) impress each other with their celebrity impressions.
58	17	Jerry Springer (host), Mark Hamill (special guest)	February 28, 1998
Kenny Rogers (Will Sasso) plugs his new ice cream parlor; guest Jerry Springer reveals to Nicole Sullivan that her boyfriend is a transsexual; Mark Hamill hosts a Pyramid-type game show where Ms. Swan (Alex Borstein) and Antonia (Nicole Sullivan) are the partners of two contestants (Chris Hogan, Phil LaMarr); Jerry Springer demands for violence to occur on his show when most of his guests (Tim Conlon, Will Sasso, Nicole Sullivan) are forgiving of each other; the Vancome Lady (Nicole Sullivan) fills in for St. Peter in heaven; Downtown Julie Brown (Debra Wilson) goes behind the scenes of the sitcom Caroline in the City; in Clops, the claymation cops arrest Paddington Bear, the Rock 'Em Sock 'Em Robots, and the Pillsbury Doughboy; whenever a man (Will Sasso) gets angry, he transforms into a miniature version of the Hulk (Alex Borstein); Jerry Springer is a bachelor on Lowered Expectations; Andy Taylor (Pat Kilbane) goes from good cop to corrupt cop in a parody of The Andy Griffith Show; a man (Pat Kilbane) promotes his headless clone ranch.
59	18	Phyllis Diller (special guest) and Corky and the Juice Pigs (musical guest)	March 7, 1998
A Mexican restaurant serves food that causes people to become sexually aroused; Debra Wilson announces the six winners of the Mad TV bus contest; in a parody of Scream, Casey Becker (Nicole Sullivan) is haunted by comedians Candice Bergen (Mary Scheer), Paul Reiser (Chris Hogan), and Chris Rock (Phil LaMarr), who tell her to try a new phone company; Phyllis Diller appears as the temporary host of Cabana Chat, then auditions for the Spice Girls as "Old Spice;" other Spice Girls auditions include an inbred idiot (Mary Scheer), Ms. Swan (Alex Borstein), and a sideshow freak (Nicole Sullivan); Corky and the Juice Pigs perform "Too Fat to Rock & Roll;" an unstable Brett Butler (Nicole Sullivan) comes out of rehab to continue her sitcom, Grace Under Influence; board members (Chris Hogan, Will Sasso, Nicole Sullivan, Debra Wilson) of an advertising agency are hesitant to put Mother Teresa's face on beer; motormouth stars Chris Tucker (Phil LaMarr) and Rosie Perez (Debra Wilson) star in a buddy cop movie; the winners of the Mad TV bus contest star in their own sketch.
60	19	Phyllis Diller (special guest)	March 14, 1998
America's favorite canine Lassie rats on everyone; Mary Scheer opens the show; the Vancome Lady (Nicole Sullivan) conducts red-carpet interviews at the Oscars; Big John (Will Sasso) and his wife, Thelma (Debra Wilson), now promote their tie shop; Jaq the UBS guy (Phil LaMarr) goes to the dentist (Debra Wilson); Lethal Weapon cops, Martin Riggs (Pat Kilbane) and Roger Murtaugh (Aries Spears) promote their own restaurant; Spice Girl auditions include a Voodoo witch (Debra Wilson), a man labeling himself as "Man Spice" (Aries Spears), a sumo wrestler, and Susan Whitfield (Lisa Kushell); Captain Kirk (Will Sasso) and Mr. Spock (Pat Kilbane) from Star Trek host their own comedy variety show with Sammy Davis, Jr. (Phil LaMarr) and a special appearance by Phyllis Diller; Stan the Java Man (Pat Kilbane) goes on his first date (Lisa Kushell); Susan Whitfield (Lisa Kushell) dampens the mood at a makeout party. Absent: Alex Borstein, Chris Hogan
61	20	Anna Nicole Smith (special guest)	March 28, 1998
Spishak promotes a new board game that has family members (Alex Borstein, Tim Conlon, Chris Hogan, Nicole Sullivan) cross dress as each other; Debra Wilson opens the show; Ms. Swan (Alex Borstein) offers her testimony to Kenneth Star (Chris Hogan); Downtown Julie Brown (Debra Wilson) interviews Hanson (Tim Conlon, Chris Hogan, Will Sasso), who premiere their new video for "Ling Ling;" the Eracists (Alex Borstein, Phil LaMarr, Will Sasso, Nicole Sullivan) entertain convicts at a local prison; a man (Phil LaMarr) plays chicken with ongoing citizens (Aries Spears); the ghost of former President John F. Kennedy (Chris Hogan) gives current President Bill Clinton (Will Sasso) some worthy advice; Anna Nicole Smith is a guest on Cabana Chat; Hugh Grant (Chris Hogan), Rupert Everett (Tim Conlon), Emma Thompson (Mary Scheer), and Michael Caine (Will Sasso) star in a horror film with British vignettes; a skinny rapper (Phil LaMarr) pesters the manager (Will Sasso) of a plus-size clothing store for some baggy pants. Absent: Pat Kilbane, Lisa Kushell Notes: Tim Conlon's last episode as a featured cast member.
62	21	Ashley Edner (special guest)	April 11, 1998
An attorney (Phil LaMarr) helps clear the names of clients who have committed life-threatening crimes; Aries Spears opens the show; Darlene McBride (Nicole Sullivan) sings politically incorrect songs for the kiddies; a discussion about marriage freaks out a man (Will Sasso) who won't admit it to his girlfriend (Lisa Kushell); Jenna Elfman (Nicole Sullivan) promotes variations of her hit show Dharma & Greg; Chris Hogan hosts a show for children with short attention spans; Stan the Java Man (Pat Kilbane) is held up in line at the supermarket due to a chattery female cashier (Will Sasso) and a slow-talking old woman (Mary Scheer); Jack Lemmon (voice of Tim Conlon) and Walter Matthau (voice of Mad TV writer Brian Hartt) reprise their roles from Grumpy Old Men in claymation form; a superhero (Phil LaMarr) proves to be very useless when it's revealed he can only use his powers for only three chances; Lisa Kushell promotes hats made for fat, stupid and ugly people; on today's Anti-Depressercize, Jr., Charlotte (Nicole Sullivan) depresses a man in a panda suit (Will Sasso). Absent: Alex Borstein
63	22	Lou Diamond Phillips (host), Dylan and Cole Sprouse, and Corky and the Juice Pigs (musical guests)	April 25, 1998
The host (Will Sasso) of Kids Say the Stupidest Things insults children; Lou Diamond Phillips makes it clear to the cast that he doesn't want to perform "La Bamba;" Ms. Swan (Alex Borstein) gives the McRonalds manager (Chris Hogan) a hard time while ordering a hamburger; the Mexican Wrestling Federation (Chris Hogan, Will Sasso, Aries Spears) holds Lou Diamond Phillips hostage to force America to let Bill Clinton run the country normally; Lou Diamond Phillips appears in an episode of Funky Walker: Dirty Talker; Chris Rock (Phil LaMarr) sings lullabies and performs stand-up comedy to get a little girl (Alex Borstein) to go to sleep; Corky and the Juice Pigs perform "Janior/Psycho" and "Todd;" Spishak promotes country-style sausages; a lonely stand-up comic (Will Sasso) is a bachelor on Lowered Expectations; an episode of The Rosie O'Donnell Show is set in the year 2150; despite the fact that she is in a coma, the Vancome Lady (Nicole Sullivan) still makes rude remarks. Absent: Mary Scheer
64	23	David Boreanaz (special guest)	May 2, 1998
A man (Pat Kilbane) becomes homeless and desperate after quitting his job at Anderson Accounting; Debra Wilson opens the show; a Peanuts and South Park animated parody called South Parknuts; Antonia (Nicole Sullivan) is given the chance to land a plane; a modern parody of I Love Lucy has Lucy (Nicole Sullivan) auditioning for Prince (Phil LaMarr); David Boreanaz attends a funeral where people (Pat Kilbane, Mary Scheer, Aries Spears, Nicole Sullivan, Debra Wilson) keep bringing up his role in Buffy the Vampire Slayer; an employee (Will Sasso) doesn't like his boss (Pat Kilbane) "waving his thing" in his face; a man (Phil LaMarr) has trouble breaking up with his girlfriend (Nicole Sullivan) in a loud restaurant; a nerdy girl (Nicole Sullivan) hosts her own art program.
65	24	Corky and the Juice Pigs (musical guests)	May 9, 1998
Rosie O'Donnell (Alex Borstein) and El Asso Wipo (Chris Hogan) are bachelors on Lowered Expectations; Mary Scheer shows off her baby to the audience; Miss Swan (Alex Borstein) is kidnapped by the owner (Chris Hogan) of a rival nail salon; Dennis Mitchell (voice of Debra Wilson) interferes with Mr. Wilson's (voice of Will Sasso) drug dealing business in Dennis the Menace II Society; a girl (Debra Wilson) annoys her date (Phil LaMarr) with her dog impressions and later appears on Lowered Expectations; a doctor (Alex Borstein) promotes her new beauty product known as "Something So Perfect;" a sketch about an arguing couple (Aries Spears, Debra Wilson) turns into a commercial for dishwashing soap; Darlene McBride (Nicole Sullivan) hosts a Mother's Day special with her own mother (Mary Scheer); a woman (Mary Scheer) calls her co-worker (Will Sasso) who she's been having an affair with. Absent: Lisa Kushell
66	25	Halle Berry (host)	May 16, 1998
The ghosts of James Stewart (Chris Hogan) and Louis Armstrong (Aries Spears) promote a new brand of condoms; Howard Stern (Pat Kilbane) opens the show and introduces guest Halle Berry; Berry also appears as a guest on Funky Walker, Dirty Talker; Steven Seagal (Will Sasso) is a bachelor on Lowered Expectations; the Parker sisters (Chris Hogan, Lisa Kushell) get a Presidential tour of the Lincoln bedroom; a claymation parody of Davey & Goliath and Pet Cemetery; Antonia (Nicole Sullivan) tries to help her casino teacher (Phil LaMarr) recover from a heart attack; God (Phil LaMarr) pays a visit to a music awards gala; a funeral speaker (Halle Berry) discusses debts a dead man owes; Spishak Pictures searches for the next big movie idea; the author (Mary Scheer) of an erotic novel is given the opportunity to narrate her own book, but the recording technicians (Will Sasso, Aries Spears) don't find her voice attractive. Absent: Alex Borstein Notes: Chris Hogan, Lisa Kushell, and Mary Scheer's last episode as cast members.

== Home releases ==
Shout! Factory released the third season on DVD on June 25, 2013.

The HBO Max/Howdy version omitted episodes 1, 4, 9, 11, and 22. Tubi's version omits the same episodes, and omitted episode 18.
