= Mad TV season 2 =

Season of television series

Mad TV
- Season 2
- DVD cover
- No. of episodes: 22

Release
- Original network: Fox
- Original release: September 21, 1996 – May 17, 1997

Season chronology
- ← Previous; Season 1 Next → Season 3

The second season of Mad TV, an American sketch comedy series, originally aired in the United States on the Fox Network between September 21, 1996, and May 17, 1997. The season had 22 episodes, and featured many of the same cast members as Season 1 had.

== Season summary ==
The second season of Mad TV was not a radical departure from season one (largely the same cast, the same humor, and the same format), though there were some minor cast changes. Tim Conlon (the show's first Canadian cast member) and Pablo Francisco (the show's first Chilean-American cast member) joined as featured players while Artie Lange was fired midway through the season for his erratic behind-the-scenes behavior due to cocaine abuse.

The addition of a weekly guest host was the most notable difference of season two, this season and the next are the only seasons of Mad TV to feature one. Although every season has had several guest stars, season two's guest stars were referred to as "hosts" and appeared in nearly every sketch. Every episode had a new host, where as in other seasons, not every episode had a guest star and the guest star usually only appeared in a few sketches. The guest host format was similar to their main rival Saturday Night Live's, but Mad TV ended this format after season three (though later seasons would have special guest stars who appeared in sketches or did monologues).

This is the second and last season to air new Spy vs. Spy and Don Martin animation before they added reruns to make up for not creating any new episodes.

== Opening montage ==
The title sequence for season two is exactly the same as the previous season, except the theme song features more bass. The sequence starts with several fingers pointing at a bomb. The bomb explodes and several different pictures of Alfred E. Neuman appear, followed by the Mad TV logo. The theme song, which is performed by the hip-hop group Heavy D & the Boyz, begins. Cast members are introduced alphabetically with their names appearing in caption over live-action clips of them. More pictures of Alfred E. Neuman appear between the introduction of each cast member. When the last cast member is introduced, the music stops and the title sequence ends with the phrase "You are now watching Mad TV."

== Cast ==
Repertory cast members

- Bryan Callen (22/22 episodes)
- David Herman (22/22 episodes)
- Orlando Jones (22/22 episodes)
- Phil LaMarr (22/22 episodes)
- Artie Lange (10/22 episodes; last episode: January 4, 1997)
- Mary Scheer (22/22 episodes)
- Nicole Sullivan (22/22 episodes)
- Debra Wilson (21/22 episodes)

Featured cast members

- Craig Anton (1/19 episodes)
- Tim Conlon (3/19 episodes; first episode: February 15, 1997)
- Pablo Francisco (4/19 episodes; February 15, 1997)

== Writers ==
- Fax Bahr (eps. 1-22)
- Stuart Blumberg (eps. 1-14)
- Garry Campbell (eps. 1-22)
- Blaine Capatch (eps. 1-22)
- Leonard Dick (eps. 3, 6)
- Lauren Dombrowski (eps. 1-22)
- Chris Finn (eps. 1-22)
- Spencer Green (eps. 1-22)
- Brian Hartt (writing supervisor) (eps. 1-22)
- Steve Hibbert (ep. 15)
- Tim Hightower (eps. 1-22)
- Brad Kaaya (eps. 1-22)
- Patton Oswalt (eps. 1-22)
- Mary Scheer (ep. 5)
- Michael Short (creative consultant) (eps. 1-22)
- Adam Small (eps. 1-22)
- Mary Elizabeth Williams (eps. 1-22)

== Episodes ==
No. overall	No. in season	Guest(s)	Original release date
20	1	Christina Applegate (host)	September 21, 1996
Christina Applegate delivers monologue which is interrupted by clips of a stripper dancing, and stars in a parody of Jeopardy! where all three contestants suffer from schizophrenia. Michael Jackson (Phil LaMarr) stars in a new movie. Three women (Christina Applegate and Mary Scheer) use elaborate pantomime during a funeral to confess that they murdered the man they're mourning. Spy vs. Spy cartoon
21	2	Ice-T (host & musical guest)	September 28, 1996
A claymation car is oblivious to a ticking sound in a parody of Chevron commercials. Ice-T introduces the cast of Mad TV, unfortunately he only introduces the African American cast members. Bob Dole (David Herman) appears at a press conference as Dolemite, while Bill Clinton (Bryan Callen) picks Ice-T as his running mate. Ice-T is a guest on a talk show hosted by a cosmetic-surgery junkie (Mary Scheer). Kathy Lee Gifford (Nicole Sullivan) runs afoul of labor laws at sweatshops producing her line of clothing and makes a TV movie to refute this. Antonia (Nicole Sullivan) finds work at a pizzeria. Ice-T performs "Bouncin' Down the Strezeet". Spy vs. Spy cartoon
22	3	Kim Coles (host)	October 5, 1996
A man (David Herman) keeps masturbating even after rehabilitation. In a commercial for the Helpful Hands Insurance, an agent (Artie Lange) berates a customer (Nicole Sullivan) like a parent would chastise a bratty child. A health education teacher (Kim Coles) teaches Catholic schoolgirls about sex. An extremely-tan tanning salon manager (Kim Coles) prepares to tan a client (Bryan Callen). A parody of Toy Story with sex toys. The Vancome Lady (Nicole Sullivan) refuses to help certain patients at the Betty Ford Clinic. Ike (Orlando Jones) and Tina Turner (Debra Wilson) argue during play versions of several children's stories. The Linder parents (David Herman, Mary Scheer) embarrass their son Mark (Bryan Callen) in front of his date (Nicole Sullivan) by talking about sex. Spy vs. Spy cartoon
23	4	Jack Wagner (host), Taylor Negron (special guest)	October 19, 1996
Spishak promotes its maxipads which can be used once a year. Demi Moore (Mary Scheer) plays Mother Teresa, who is ogled by perverted Middle Eastern citizens in the movie Mother of Mercy. Bill Clinton (Bryan Callen) and Bob Dole (David Herman) debate before a pre-teen audience. Dr. Jack Kevorkian (Bryan Callen) gives presents to his 100th patient (Nicole Sullivan), who is unsure that she wants to die. Note: This is the last episode of Don Martin
24	5	Neve Campbell (host)	November 2, 1996
A witness on the stand (Mary Scheer) is unable to tell her story. Neve Campbell tries to perform a comedy routine during her monologue, but it turns depressing. Spishak's advertises a car wax that doesn't guarantee full protection for your car. X-News reporters discuss presidential nominees; a classmate (Phil LaMarr) holding a grudge against Amy (Nicole Sullivan) appears on the show. Tony Bright (Bryan Callen) promotes a do-it-yourself dentist kit. Julia (Neve Campbell) romances presidential candidate Bob Dole (David Herman) in a Party of Five parody. Ed McMahon (Artie Lange) stars in a parody of Dead Man Walking. A preacher (Orlando Jones) uses pop-culture references to describe the events of Jesus's life. Craig Anton screams out what he hates and loves while wearing a towel during a monologue. A baggage claims guard (Phil LaMarr) berates a passenger (Neve Campbell). Spy vs. Spy - Cactus.
25	6	Kevin McDonald (host), Tony Cox (special guest)	November 9, 1996
A couple (Kevin McDonald, Mary Scheer) try to lure a family member out from under the bed. Kevin McDonald forces Artie Lange to hit his bodyguard (Tony Cox). A parody of Wal-Mart commercials. On Incredible Findings, Tony Bright (Bryan Callen) promotes a shock therapy kit to cure depression. Woody Allen (David Herman) directs an urban film starring Snoop Doggy Dogg (Orlando Jones) and Rosie Perez (Debra Wilson). UBS guy Jaq (Phil LaMarr) goes on a date. The Vancome Lady (Nicole Sullivan) berates people while working at a casino.
26	7	Joe Rogan (host) and Ken Norton Jr (special guest)	November 16, 1996
A game show contestant (Debra Wilson) puts her skills to the test when she pays for her food. In "Be-Bitched", a parody of Bewitched, Samantha (Nicole Sullivan) twitches her nose and transforms herself into a mean black girl (Debra Wilson) whenever she's provoked. Host Joe Rogan appears on Cabana Chat with Dixie Wetsworth (Mary Scheer). A boxer (Joe Rogan) doesn't realize the dive he's supposed to take won't happen as expected.
27	8	French Stewart (host)	December 7, 1996
Host French Stewart plays an impatient boss who demands his employees to talk faster, then appears in a sketch where other houseguests do impersonations of each other. Incredible Findings introduces a do-it-yourself cosmetic kit. Sammy Hagar (Bryan Callen) is a bachelor on Lowered Expectations. Bill Cosby (Orlando Jones) revises the format of his show to give it a more urban flavor. A woman (Nicole Sullivan) is forced to break up with her bank.
28	9	Harry Connick, Jr (host)	December 14, 1996
"The Vancome Lady: Virgin Mary"; "The Reinfather"; "The Greatest Action Story Ever Told"; and Spy vs. Spy: Karate School.
29	10	Andrea Martin (host)	January 4, 1997
A promotion for toilet water-scented perfume. Host Andrea Martin introduces the cast of Mad TV. African-Americans try to prevent whites from using black slang. A boss (Andrea Martin) is forced to fire several employees. A government agent (Artie Lange) informs a man (David Herman) that he's President of the United States. A TV drama focuses on the personal and professional lives of car valets. A doctor (Phil LaMarr) entertains his patient (Debra Wilson) with a puppet. Note: Artie Lange’s last episode as a cast member.
30	11	Brian Bosworth and Dom Irrera (special guests)	January 25, 1997
"Gato-Ade" commercial parody; "UBS Super Bowl Party"; "Vancome Locker" sketch; and "Vud Bowl V."
31	12	Rodney Dangerfield (host)	February 1, 1997
Marsh (David Herman) proves that he loves African-Americans on X-News. R&B singer Savante (Phil LaMarr) is asked to sing for a children's benefit album, but his language offends two executives (David Herman, Debra Wilson). Thriller and humor mix in a parody of Suddenly Susan and Millennium. Host Rodney Dangerfield plugs his film Meet Wally Sparks on Cabana Chat. At a rental car agency, a man (Orlando Jones) tries to prove he didn't pass wind. A college student (Phil LaMarr) unwittingly finds himself in a fight courtesy of his dorm roommate (Bryan Callen)
32	13	Queen Latifah (host)	February 8, 1997
David Herman delivers a message from The Man. Debra Wilson gets host Queen Latifah's autograph. A lawyer (Bryan Callen) helps clear the names of people accused of witchcraft. Doctors and nurses try to conceal a newborn baby's extreme height from its mother (Debra Wilson). Rick (Phil LaMarr), unaware that he's in a lesbian bar, hits on one of the patrons (Queen Latifah). A young Alanis Morissette (Debra Wilson) sings during a press conference. Samuel L. Jackson (Orlando Jones) fumes when his mailbox is vandalized in a parody of A Time to Kill. An ardent fan disrupts Queen Latifah during her monologue on the various forms of rap music. A little girl (Nicole Sullivan) causes havoc in a restaurant. Bum Joe Don (David Herman) is dissatisfied with his stink-sucking job. A robber (Orlando Jones) hosts his own cooking show. A man (David Herman) constantly asks his friend (Phil LaMarr) if he can borrow his car.
33	14	Tommy Davidson (host), Tom Kenny (special guest)	February 15, 1997
"Hospital"; "Town Meeting" and "Progressive Parenting". Note: Tim Conlon and Pablo Francisco's first episode as featured cast members.
34	15	Bobcat Goldthwait (host)	March 8, 1997
A Lowered Expectations bachelorette (Mary Scheer) proves there's no fury like a woman scorned. Host Bobcat Goldthwait delivers several public service announcements, and stars as a fast-food worker gunning for the employee-of-the-month award. A dance-calling couple (David Herman, Mary Scheer) argue with each other during a hoedown. A night of drinking leaves a woman (Nicole Sullivan) with more than just a hangover. A Lowered Expectations bachelor (Phil LaMarr) looks to have a one-night stand for cash. A nerd (Debra Wilson) hosts her own TV show in which she interviews a forest ranger (Mary Scheer). A babysitter (Mary Scheer) tries to kill a youngster (Bryan Callen).
35	16	Pauly Shore (host)	March 15, 1997
While Bill Clinton (Bryan Callen) addresses the nation, Orlando Jones translates the President's speech in ebonics. Host Pauly Shore delivers stand-up comedy routine and appears on Cabana Chat. A new show called Test Pattern appears between Seinfeld and ER. Antonia (Nicole Sullivan) appears on Lowered Expectations and becomes a trainee at a fast-food restaurant. Two employees (Bryan Callen, Mary Scheer) don't realize that their boss is going to commit suicide. A boss (David Herman) is too drunk to conduct an interview.
36	17	Thomas Calabro (host) and Corky and the Juice Pigs (Musical Guest)	April 5, 1997
For Black History Month, an historian (Phil LaMarr) addresses the black viewers on what scares white people the most. Thomas Calabro talks about his role on Melrose Place, giving spoilers. In Africa, primatologist Polly (Mary Scheer) reflects on her progress with Cha-Cha the gorilla (David Herman). “Furious George” claymation - George the monkey fights back against the man in the yellow lab coat. Stupid people (Mary Scheer, Nicole Sullivan, Bryan Callen, David Herman, Tim Conlon) attend a Stoopid Anonymous meeting. Wendy (Mary Scheer) corrects her husband Paul’s (Bryan Callen) dinner table behavior in the kitchen, as well as Bill (Orlando Jones) and Lana (Debra Wilson). Corky and the Juice Pigs perform “Eskimo”. On TrialTV, Reverend Flatback (Orlando Jones) is on trial for false advertising. Marriage counselor Dr. H. Paul Flavin (Tim Conlon) promotes his upcoming live appearance. Cops (Thomas Calabro, Orlando Jones, Phil LaMarr, David Herman, Tim Conlon) conduct a manhunt for the “Mad Dog Killer”, who they all happen to know personally. Spy vs. Spy: White Spy forces Black Spy to build a gallows, which backfires.
37	18	Mark Curry (host), Ike Turner (special guest)	April 12, 1997
Spishak's new product is a combination spoon, fork, and knife. Mark Curry performs a rap song during his opening monologue. A couple (Bryan Callen, Nicole Sullivan) deals with a man (Mark Curry) who maneuvers in a canoe. Ike Turner (Orlando Jones) argues with wife Tina (Debra Wilson) after he delivers a pizza. Fran Drescher (Mary Scheer) shows clips of rabid babies in a FOX special, When Babies Attack. On The Kenny Kingston Show, the host (David Herman) welcomes Ike Turner as his co-host and interviews Nelson Mandela (Phil LaMarr). During three commercials for a rose collection, the announcer (David Herman) unleashes a torrent of anger when customers don't show appreciation for the roses' creator. Several people talk about their television appearances. An immature man (Mark Curry) won't accept a break-up with his girlfriend (Debra Wilson) and does whatever it takes to stay with her.
38	19	Adam Arkin (host) Bob Marley (special guest)	April 26, 1997
Host Adam Arkin is forced to wear, and pay for, clothes recommended by Isaac Mizrahi (Adam Arkin also). In a parody of The Mary Tyler Moore Show, Lou Grant (Adam Arkin) learns several things about lesbians. Meet Mexican wrestler El Asso Wipo (David Herman). O. J. Simpson (Orlando Jones) appears on The Kenny Kingston Show to promote a TV series where he hopes to find who killed his wife. Two doctors (Adam Arkin, David Herman) play good surgeon/bad surgeon to extract a kidney from a patient (Orlando Jones). Jaq (Phil LaMarr) tries to help a homeless man (David Herman) who becomes annoyed at Jaq's overtures. Joel (David Herman) and Connie Linder (Mary Scheer) embarrass their son Mark (Bryan Callen) as he moves into his dorm with a psychotic roommate (Orlando Jones). A Lowered Expectations single woman (Mary Scheer) lists guys whose eyes pop out of their heads as one of her pet peeves. Bob Marley discusses his father in a monologue. Absent: Debra Wilson
39	20	Ryan Stiles (host)	May 3, 1997
A woman (Nicole Sullivan) finds herself dating a man who sounds like the Moviefone announcer (Pablo Francisco). Phil LaMarr pushes Ryan Stiles to show off his improvisational skills during his monologue, but ends up stealing the scene himself, much to Stiles' chagrin. Michael Jackson (Phil LaMarr) appears on Oprah. Sinbad (Phil LaMarr) stars in a movie where he won't shut up. Ryan Stiles, in another monologue, sings about girls who love guys with big toes. A salesman (Orlando Jones) promotes the enslavement of white people. Two Mediterranean caterers (Debra Wilson and Nicole Sullivan) prepare deadly food for a party. While visiting his buddy's apartment, a man (Phil LaMarr) makes threats to people who make a lot of noise.
40	21	David Faustino (host)	May 10, 1997
A bride (Nicole Sullivan) reads a very disturbing vow during a wedding. David Faustino hosts a beauty pageant and plays a guy who dates a teacher (Mary Scheer). Larry Flynt (David Herman) turns an adaptation of a Jane Austen film into a porno. A Three Stooges parody where Moe, Larry, and Curly (LaMarr, Wilson, and Jones) are bumbling drug dealers sent to kill a wealthy, white cocaine kingpin (Faustino) at a high-society party. A mother (Mary Scheer) intimidates her employee son (Bryan Callen) at a butcher shop.
41	22	LL Cool J (host)	May 17, 1997
"En Vogue"; "The Breakup"; "Don't Talk to Me"; "Manic Depressive Stripper" and "Clops." Gangsta Shop Quartet—Spishak Records' infomercial selling music that combines Gangsta Rap and Barbershop Quartet—barbershop-style harmonizing of gangsta lyrics. Notes: Bryan Callen and Orlando Jones's last episode as cast members. Pablo Francisco's last episode as a featured cast member.

== Home releases ==
Despite a preview on the special features disc of the Mad TV: the Complete First Season DVD box set, season two of Mad TV was not initially released on DVD due to poor sales of season one. Shout Factory finally released the complete second season on March 26, 2013.

The HBO Max and Howdy versions omitted episodes 2, 3, 9, 14, 21 and 22, with episodes 21 and 22 redone as "best-of" episodes. In contrast, Tubi initially didn't have season 2 when the entire series was uploaded. In August 2026, season two was uploaded. Much like the HBO Max and Howdy versions, Tubi's version also omitted episodes 2, 3, 9, 14, 21, and 22, with episodes 21 and 22 redone as clip show episodes (though episode 21 is erroneously marked as "Episode 23" while the second clip show episode is called "The Best of MADtv Season 2").
