= Captain Klutz =

Comic strip character

Cover to The MAD Adventures of Captain Klutz (Signet, 1967). Art by Don Martin.

Captain Klutz is a comic strip character created in 1967 by Don Martin. He is a parody of superhero characters. The character originally saw print in a series of original paperback books done for the Mad magazine paperback line, not the magazine itself.

== Backstory ==
The protagonist, Ringo Fonebone, is a hopelessly inept man utterly absorbed in reading comic books to the point that he was kicked out of his parents' house, a vocational school he tried to attend and a flophouse (the last expulsion left him in nothing but a set of red long johns and dotted boxer shorts). While attempting suicide by hanging himself, the towel he used as a rope broke, inadvertently acquiring a mask (originally a woman's hat being thrown out by her irate husband), and finally crash-landed in the middle of a robbery, in long-johns, his "mask" and towel "cape", distracting the robber long enough for the police to capture him. The robber's angry exclamation, "Why, you klutz!," was taken by the dazed (and temporarily amnesiac) Ringo as his name, and he responded to the officers' questions regarding his identity with: "I'm...a klutz, captain." The police thought he had said he was "Captain Klutz".

== Adventures ==
Captain Klutz did not lead a luxurious life, being reduced to homelessness at various times. (In one adventure, "my new airy apartment" was a park bench; in another, he hoped an invention would give him super-speed, so he could get a pizza delivery job.) He was also utterly inept at crime-fighting (apparent clumsiness), being poor at deduction, easily misled, and naive. (An alleged "kung fu master" easily conned Klutz for phony "training" in martial arts.) He usually succeeded in capturing the bad guy in spite of himself.

His main ally was Police Chief O'Freenbean, and he fought a variety of enemies, including:

- Sissyman (a villainous mama's boy whose secret headquarters was in his mother's house; his weapons included an ice-cream gun)
- Comrade Stupidska
- Mervin the Mad Bomber (Captain Klutz tries to lure Mervin out of hiding by calling on a bevy of his loved ones, including family, friends, and the entire Norman Luboff Choir)
- Gorgonzola (a giant mechanical spider; Klutz defeats him by grabbing a leg and sticking it into an electrical socket)
- The Cackling Cockroach

== Creators ==
Don Martin illustrated all the Captain Klutz stories. Numerous writers were credited for the stories. A listing of the stories, as well as the credited writers, follows.

The MAD Adventures of Captain Klutz (1967) Stories below uncredited; credited writers Dick DeBartolo, Phil Hahn, Jack Hanrahan, Don Martin

- Prologue/Origin

The genesis of Captain Klutz.

- "Sissyman"

No master of disguise, Klutz wears a rabbit costume while undercover as a high school football player.

- "The Message"

Klutz writes to Chief O'Freenbean in invisible ink.

- "Chicken Soup"

A scheming matron builds an army of zombies, by drugging the food at her soup kitchen.

- "On The Elevator"

Chief O'Freenbean suffers a mishap when he attempts to enter an elevator which Klutz has already boarded.

- "Gorgonzola"

A story of man versus spider.

- "Mervin the Mad Bomber"

Klutz learns to think twice, before calling out the bomb squad.

MAD's Don Martin Carries On (1973)

- "The Man of 1,000 Faces (Give or Take 900)" written by Dick DeBartolo

MAD's Don Martin Steps Further Out (1975)

- "Kung Fu To You, Too!" written by Dick DeBartolo

MAD's Don Martin Forges Ahead (1977)

- "The Barfing Affair" written by Don Edwing

MAD's Don Martin Digs Deeper (1979)

- "The Gravest Show on Earth" written by Dick DeBartolo

MAD's Don Martin Grinds Ahead (1981)

- "The Cackling Cockroach" written by Don Martin

MAD's Don Martin Presents Captain Klutz II (1983)

- "To Brusha with Love" written by Don Edwing
- "The Klutz File", uncredited
- "Hollywood Whodunnit", written by Dick DeBartolo
- "The Sounds of Captain Klutz" and "The Klutz File", uncredited
- "Theme Song from Captain Klutz – The Book" written by Don Martin and Nick Meglin, music by Norm Blagman
- "The Klutz File", "Captain Klutz's Agendum for Secret Messages" and "Crimefighter's Corner" uncredited
- "The Major Catastrophe" written by Don Edwing

Additional writers: John Gibbons, Norma Martin, and Dick DeBartolo

MAD's Don Martin Sails Ahead (1986)

- "Klutzenstein" written by Don Edwing

== Appearances ==
Captain Klutz's adventures were featured in the following volumes:

- The MAD Adventures of Captain Klutz (Signet, 1967)
- MAD's Don Martin Presents Captain Klutz II (Warner Books, 1983)

Captain Klutz stories also appeared in the following Don Martin anthologies:

- MAD's Don Martin Carries On (Warner Books, 1973)
- MAD's Don Martin Steps Further Out (Warner Books, 1975)
- MAD's Don Martin Forges Ahead (Warner Books, 1977)
- MAD's Don Martin Digs Deeper (Warner Books, 1979)
- MAD's Don Martin Grinds Ahead (Warner Books, 1981)
- MAD's Don Martin Sails Ahead (Warner Books, 1986)
