= Mad TV season 4 =

Season of television series

Mad TV
- Season 4
- DVD cover
- No. of episodes: 25

Release
- Original network: Fox
- Original release: September 12, 1998 – May 22, 1999

Season chronology
- ← Previous; Season 3 Next → Season 5

The fourth season of Mad TV, an American sketch comedy series, originally aired in the United States on the Fox Network between September 12, 1998, and May 22, 1999.

== Season summary ==
The new season had several cast changes. Mary Scheer, David Herman, Chris Hogan, Craig Anton, Tim Conlon, and Lisa Kushell left the show. Andrew Bowen (in what would be his only season) and Mo Collins joined as repertory players, with Michael McDonald as a featured player (and later upgraded to the repertory status). Nicole Sullivan did not appear in the first five episodes of the fourth season. However, she did return in the sixth episode, the show's Halloween special, performing her popular characters Antonia and The Vancome Lady.

Season four had a notable change of pace and format compared to the first three seasons. The show had a faster pace and began to use recurring characters more, as seen with the quirky mother/son duo Doreen (Collins) and Stuart (McDonald) Larkin. Separately, Collins played the eccentric Midwestern character Lorraine Swanson and McDonald played sleazy Jewish director Marvin Tikvah in sketches that appeared in heavy rotation.

Original cast players Nicole Sullivan and Debra Wilson introduced new characters, playing Latina bimbos Lida and Melina together, while Wilson performed Bunifa, a fast-talking ghetto fabulous girl. Alex Borstein frequently appeared as Ms. Swan and Rosie O'Donnell; Pat Kilbane appeared as the Coffee Guy and the spokesman for Spishak, and performed his Howard Stern impersonation; Will Sasso frequently impersonated famous people such as Bill Clinton, Kenny Rogers, Steven Seagal, Randy Newman, William Shatner, and Jesse Ventura; Aries Spears did several impersonations such as Eddie Murphy, Bill Cosby, Jesse Jackson, Mike Tyson, and Magic Johnson, as well as his reoccurring character James Brown, Jr.

Season four was marked by one notable controversy. During the February 6, 1999 episode, Bret Hart appeared in a sketch with Will Sasso. Hart, a WCW wrestler, attacked Sasso during filming. It was unclear whether the attack was scripted or an ad-libbed part that was kept in, until a Mad TV head writer revealed that the fight was not scripted, was real, and Sasso was actually injured from it.

== Opening montage ==
The Mad TV logo appears against the backdrop of a busy street in Los Angeles. The theme song, which is performed by the hip-hop group Heavy D & the Boyz, begins. Cast members are introduced alphabetically, with their names appearing in caption over a slow-motion montage of color still photos of them. When the last featured cast member is introduced, the music stops and the title sequence ends with the phrase "You are now watching Mad TV."

== Cast ==
Repertory cast members

- Alex Borstein (25/25 episodes)
- Andrew Bowen (25/25 episodes)
- Mo Collins (19/25 episodes)
- Pat Kilbane (25/25 episodes)
- Phil LaMarr (25/25 episodes)
- Michael McDonald* (20/25 episodes)
- Will Sasso (25/25 episodes)
- Aries Spears (25/25 episodes)
- Nicole Sullivan (20/25 episodes)
- Debra Wilson (25/25 episodes)

* Performer was a featured cast member at the start of the season, but was promoted to repertory status mid-season.

== Episodes ==
No. overall	No. in season	Guest(s)	Original release date
67	1	Vivica A. Fox, Usher	September 12, 1998
Ms. Swan (Alex Borstein) opens the show with a joke; a spoof of There's Something About Mary focuses on the illicit romance between Bill Clinton (Will Sasso) and his intern Monica Lewinsky (Alex Borstein); Keanu Reeves (Andrew Bowen) gives students (Mo Collins, Aries Spears) lessons in his brand of wooden acting; Al Gore (Pat Kilbane) gives sex tips to a couple (Aries Spears, Debra Wilson) in bed; CNN frequently interrupts a TV show with an important news bulletin by Bernard Shaw (Phil LaMarr); a man (Will Sasso) calling a sex line accidentally reaches Ms. Swan (Alex Borstein); Mad TV vies for Emmy consideration with a sketch featuring Sonny Bono's widow Mary (Alex Borstein) and first wife Cher (Mo Collins) settling their differences through song; a jock (Aries Spears) is less than thrilled to have overexcited nerd Rusty Miller (Michael McDonald) as his dorm mate; Vivica A. Fox is a guest on Funky Walker, Dirty Talker; Usher records a duet with Savante (Phil LaMarr). Absent: Nicole Sullivan Notes: Andrew Bowen and Mo Collins' first episode as cast members. Michael McDonald's first episode as a featured cast member.
68	2	TBA	September 19, 1998
Howard Stern (Pat Kilbane) reviews Mad TV's past and present cast; Siegfried (Pat Kilbane) & Roy (Michael McDonald) fight crime and their fear of women in a crime drama; a commercial parody for Spishak's newest product, Meat-Beaters, shows a man (Will Sasso) apparently masturbating as he prepares food; obese Jewish film director Marvin Tikvah (Michael McDonald) joins a fitness program; a news reporter (Alex Borstein) is given a birthday surprise while reporting on a crime scene; JCPenney promotes clothes that protect children from school shootings; Kenny Rogers (Will Sasso) and James Brown, Jr. (Aries Spears) host a cooking show; Nicolas Cage (Andrew Bowen) introduces a vintage superhero show called Rocket Revengers; a randy senior citizen (Michael McDonald) recalls how he survived the sinking of the Titanic; Trina Moss (Mo Collins) works at the OB-GYN clinic. Absent: Nicole Sullivan
69	3	TBA	September 26, 1998
Bill Clinton (Will Sasso) and Rev. Jesse Jackson (Aries Spears) open the show with some improv; Steven Seagal (Will Sasso) kicks the crap out of people (Alex Borstein, Andrew Bowen, Mo Collins, Phil LaMarr) while touring America; a scientist (Debra Wilson) promotes a virtual reality retirement home; female office workers (Alex Borstein, Mo Collins, Debra Wilson) find UBS guy Jaq (Phil LaMarr) attractive; Lorraine (Mo Collins) peruses a box of tacks at a yard sale; Chris Rock (Phil LaMarr) demands funnier material in a modern day episode of The Dick Van Dyke Show; Spishak promotes a cereal bowl that also works as a pasta bowl; Stuart Larkin (Michael McDonald) gets lost. Absent: Nicole Sullivan
70	4	TBA	October 3, 1998
Mark McGwire (Will Sasso) and Sammy Sosa (Phil LaMarr) dance with each other throughout the episode; Beverly Hills, 90210 and Halloween H20: 20 Years Later merge in a parody; a parody of He Got Game has Denzel Washington (Aries Spears) playing it not-so-straight; a young kid repeatedly hits his stepdad (Pat Kilbane) in the groin; a hotel guest (Will Sasso) gets into an argument with the staff (Mo Collins, Pat Kilbane); The Donny & Marie Show turns as sleazy as Howard Stern's radio show; a parody of feminine hygiene commercials turns into a promotion for Canada's marriage laws; Magic Johnson (Aries Spears), Sheila E. (Debra Wilson), and Tommy Davidson (Phil LaMarr) star in a parody of courtroom shows; a sketch about a man (Phil LaMarr) facing financial problems turns into a segment with Bill Cosby (Aries Spears) promoting Jell-O pudding. Absent: Michael McDonald, Nicole Sullivan
71	5	Gary Coleman, Kevin Sorbo	October 10, 1998
Jaq the UBS guy (Phil LaMarr) opens the show; Ms. Swan (Alex Borstein) gets hypnotized; Debra Wilson promotes a product for keeping women's nether regions fresh; Monica Lewinsky (Alex Borstein) appears on Talking American; an elderly woman (Alex Borstein) is given the task of tracing a dead body at a crime scene; Trina Moss (Mo Collins) attends a baby shower; Rosie O'Donnell (Alex Borstein) interviews Kevin Sorbo on the set of his sitcom, Oh, Hercules; Eddie Murphy (Aries Spears) tries to prove that he can be a serious actor by starring in a remake of Ben-Hur with Keanu Reeves (Andrew Bowen), but ends up being in a comedy film with Gary Coleman; a man (Phil LaMarr) is given a job interview with Genghis Khan (Pat Kilbane). Absent: Michael McDonald, Nicole Sullivan
72	6	Kiss, Robert Englund	October 31, 1998
The Vancome Lady (Nicole Sullivan) wishes everyone a Happy Halloween; Ms. Swan (Alex Borstein) tries to rent a scary movie; the members of KISS appear in a sketch as life-size action figures which must stop Michael Jackson (Phil LaMarr); in another sketch, the band members go on a date (Nicole Sullivan); Natalie Merchant (Alex Borstein) sings a parody of Monster Mash with Puff Daddy (Phil LaMarr) and Mase (Aries Spears); Kenny Rogers (Will Sasso) promotes a duet album with Cher (Mo Collins), Björk (Alex Borstein), Marilyn Manson (Pat Kilbane), and Nat King Cole (Phil LaMarr); after a sketch about his role in V, Robert Englund becomes entangled in a string of murders on the Mad TV set; Stuart Larkin (Michael McDonald) goes trick-or-treating with Antonia (Nicole Sullivan); Lil' Nestor (voice of Nicole Sullivan) goes trick-or-treating at a psycho killer's house. Notes: Nicole Sullivan returns to the cast for this episode. She would remain with the show for two more seasons.
73	7	TBA	November 7, 1998
Stan the Coffee Guy (Pat Kilbane) opens the show; 1950s singer Little Hassan Taylor (Phil LaMarr) performs anti-white songs; a porno version of Saving Private Ryan has two nymphomaniacs (Mo Collins, Debra Wilson) service troops; Magic Johnson (Aries Spears) hosts Jeopardy!; Björk (Alex Borstein), Marilyn Manson (Pat Kilbane), and Stuart (Michael McDonald) & Doreen Larkin (Mo Collins) appear on Lowered Expectations; an undergraduate named "Intensity" (Nicole Sullivan) is obsessed with a man (Pat Kilbane) she barely knows in a parody of Felicity; Lida (Nicole Sullivan) and Melina (Debra Wilson) promote their own beauty salon; in a new medical drama, the hospital staff (Alex Borstein, Mo Collins, Phil LaMarr) is so focused on their work that they ignore other patients in the waiting room; a drunken storyteller (Will Sasso) tells fractured fairy tales to children; Reverend Jesse Jackson (Aries Spears) plays psychiatrist to the Clinton family (Alex Borstein, Mo Collins, Will Sasso).
74	8	TBA	November 14, 1998
Nicolas Cage (Andrew Bowen) opens the show; the Vancome Lady (Nicole Sullivan) hosts her own game show; Spishak sells commemorative plates based on the Monica Lewinsky scandal and later promotes a dance drunken fathers (Michael McDonald) can perform at wedding parties; Michael McCleoud (Will Sasso) and Jasmine Wayne-Wayne (Alex Borstein) sing an annoying song; James Brown, Jr. (Aries Spears) does celebrity impressions; Rusty Miller (Michael McDonald) goes to the College Bowl; Karl Childers (Pat Kilbane) and Blade (Aries Spears) join forces in a new movie; working as a maternity ward nurse, Antonia (Nicole Sullivan) delivers the wrong baby to a new mother's (Alex Borstein) room. Absent: Mo Collins
75	9	TBA	November 21, 1998
The Larkins (Mo Collins, Michael McDonald), Jaq (Phil LaMarr), Lida (Nicole Sullivan) & Melina (Debra Wilson), Ms. Swan (Alex Borstein), and Sally Kowalski (Mo Collins) share their Thanksgiving memories with the audience; Steven Seagal (Will Sasso) and Jean-Claude Van Damme (Andrew Bowen) defend their father (Michael McDonald) in the hard-hitting drama One True Impact; Kenny Rogers (Will Sasso) and James Brown, Jr. (Aries Spears) host a Thanksgiving cooking show, where they must cook food for homeless people; a man (Phil LaMarr) becomes so obsessed with the taste of the food he's served that he goes insane; Pat Kilbane tells his "Snapshot Story;" Stuart (Michael McDonald) goes to the airport to visit his estranged father; Darlene McBride (Nicole Sullivan) promotes her new Thanksgiving album; Happy Folger (Michael McDonald) tells a messed up Thanksgiving story.
76	10	Shaquille O'Neal	December 5, 1998
Shaquille O'Neal interrupts a monologue by Mother Love (Aries Spears); the Eracists (Alex Borstein, Will Sasso, Aries Spears, Nicole Sullivan) spread their message of tolerance in the Middle East; Lethal Weapon cops Riggs (Pat Kilbane) and Murtaugh (Aries Spears) appear at a comedy club with Kenny Rogers (Will Sasso) and his puppet friend Pappy; on an episode of Forgive or Forget, Mother Love (Aries Spears) hopes to reunite Bobby Brown (Phil LaMarr) with Whitney Houston (Debra Wilson); in a parody of Meet Joe Black, Brad Pitt (Andrew Bowen) tries to escape the clutches of Touched By An Angel's Della Reese (Debra Wilson); Shaquille O'Neal plays a prisoner who misinterprets a message and Dennis Rodman's sister on Lowered Expectations; Rick (Phil LaMarr) appears as a contestant on The Dating Game where one of his potential suitors is Ms. Swan (Alex Borstein); a college jock (Andrew Bowen) hosts his own show from his dorm room. Absent: Mo Collins, Michael McDonald
77	11	TBA	December 12, 1998
Ellen DeGeneres (Alex Borstein) and Anne Heche (Mo Collins) open the show; the Spishak spokesman (Pat Kilbane) promotes radioactive Christmas tree lights; Rusty Miller (Michael McDonald) tries to celebrate the holidays by himself; Ms. Swan (Alex Borstein) goes Christmas shopping at The Sharpest Image; woodworking show host Paul Timberman (Will Sasso) endangers himself with power tools while putting up a Christmas tree; Stuart (Michael McDonald) & Doreen Larkin (Mo Collins) participate in a Christmas pageant; Old Man Sasso (Will Sasso) drunkenly reads "'Twas the Night Before Christmas" to children; a claymation parody of I Know What You Did Last Summer involves Christmas; the Vancome Lady (Nicole Sullivan) insults Adam Sandler (Michael McDonald) in A Vancome Christmas Carol; Magic Johnson's (Aries Spears) literacy skills fail him when he tries to ring in Kwanzaa.
78	12	TBA	January 9, 1999
Jesse Ventura (Will Sasso) opens the show; a man (Michael McDonald) tries to get nearly everyone to go down on him; Keanu Reeves (Andrew Bowen) and Steven Seagal (Will Sasso) perform stand-up comedy at a comedy club; Saturn employees (Alex Borstein, Phil LaMarr, Aries Spears) harass a couple (Will Sasso, Nicole Sullivan) in a commercial for Honda; lounge singer Shaunda (Alex Borstein) sings in a public restroom; while performing at a hospital, the Lethal Weapon cops (Pat Kilbane, Aries Spears) receive a lukewarm reception to their over-the-top antics; in a parody of Dawson's Creek, the teenage cast is replaced by children; the Spishak salesman (Pat Kilbane) promotes a mini-guillotine that chops vegetables and can be used for a quick and easy circumcision for Jewish bris reasons; Ellen DeGeneres (Alex Borstein) questions if Anne Heche (Mo Collins) will remain loyal to her; Sally Kowalski (Mo Collins) supports the Green Bay Packers.
79	13	TBA	January 16, 1999
James Brown, Jr. (Aries Spears) opens the show; Spishak promotes a razor with 20 blades; Celine Dion (Nicole Sullivan) celebrates Martin Luther King Day in song; Bunifa (Debra Wilson) goes on a date (Phil LaMarr) and appears on Lowered Expectations; Will Sasso is bothered by his annoying sister (Alex Borstein) at an arcade; Nicole Sullivan tells her "Snapshot Story;" a psychotic woman (Nicole Sullivan) obsessed with murder appears on Lowered Expectations; Ms. Swan (Alex Borstein) tries to use an automated teller machine; Charlie Sheen (Andrew Bowen) discusses his drug escapades in an anti-drug commercial; Bill Cosby (Aries Spears) hosts a parody of Kids Say the Darndest Things where the "kids" are pimps (Phil LaMarr, Will Sasso, Debra Wilson). Absent: Mo Collins, Michael McDonald
80	14	TBA	January 30, 1999
Keanu Reeves (Andrew Bowen) opens the show; Nicole Sullivan shows a couple (Phil LaMarr, Debra Wilson) how to save money on their phone bill; Antonia (Nicole Sullivan) referees a football game; a woman (Mo Collins) helps her friend (Debra Wilson) pick up guys; Adam Sandler (Michael McDonald), Drew Barrymore (Nicole Sullivan), and Michael Flatley (Andrew Bowen) star in The Riverboy; the Vancome Lady (Nicole Sullivan) sells refreshments at a football game; Kenny Rogers (Will Sasso) hosts a Super Bowl halftime show; the GAP troll (Alex Borstein) gets frustrated with a man (Pat Kilbane) who's bad at answering simple riddles.
81	15	Bret "The Hitman" Hart	February 6, 1999
Kenny Rogers (Will Sasso) opens the show and discusses his portrayal on Mad TV; Antonia (Nicole Sullivan) plugs her own perfume; Randy Newman (Will Sasso) composes songs for the new Star Wars movie with Rob Zombie (Pat Kilbane); Bunifa (Debra Wilson) gets a fast-food employee (Nicole Sullivan) fired; Prince (Phil LaMarr) stars in a parody of The Prince of Egypt; a sketch where Minnesota Governor Jesse Ventura (Will Sasso) introduces his new lieutenant governor, Bret Hart, gets derailed when Hart decides to attack Sasso as revenge for attempting to humiliate him the last time he was on the show; Stuart Larkin (Michael McDonald) goes to the doctor (Nicole Sullivan); Pop-Up Video presents a music video from Alanis Morissette (Mo Collins), and reveals what went on during the shoot; Steven Seagal (Will Sasso) and Ice Cube (Aries Spears) star in The Odd Couple III with Rosie Perez (Debra Wilson) and Roseanne Barr (Alex Borstein); Keanu Reeves (Andrew Bowen) is a Lowered Expectations bachelor; Bret Hart attacks Will Sasso during the goodnights.
82	16	Brian McKnight	February 13, 1999
Rusty Miller (Michael McDonald) opens the show by plugging his college; Magic Johnson (Aries Spears) doesn't fare well as a teacher; Brian McKnight stars as himself on The Dating Game, where Bunifa (Debra Wilson) is the contestant; Ms. Swan (Alex Borstein) creates a disturbance in both the concession line and the theater at a local cineplex; a Spanish-language version of Three's Company airs; a Star Wars special edition features clips of Han Solo (Andrew Bowen) fleeing danger; Old Man Sasso (Will Sasso) reads a fractured Valentine's Day tale to children; Will Sasso trains to exact revenge on Bret Hart for injuring him during the previous episode of Mad TV; during the taping of a cooking show, the chef (Nicole Sullivan) broods about her romantic problems.
83	17	TBA	February 20, 1999
Ms. Swan (Alex Borstein) opens the show by singing the Mad TV theme song; a special McDonald's feast helps those who want to look like Ally McBeal; a new Spishak product doesn't work well for its user (Andrew Bowen), but his wife (Alex Borstein) falls for the salesman (Pat Kilbane); the O'Malley parents (Mo Collins, Michael McDonald) embarrass their daughter (Nicole Sullivan) with their nudity in front of her boyfriend (Andrew Bowen); Robin Williams (Pat Kilbane) stars in a variation of Patch Adams; a married couple (Michael McDonald, Nicole Sullivan) struggle to get into their honeymoon suite; Michael Jackson (Phil LaMarr) and Deborah Rowe (Alex Borstein) appear on Change of Heart; the events surrounding John (Michael McDonald) and Patsy Ramsey (Alex Borstein) are recast as a romantic comedy starring Tom Hanks (Pat Kilbane) and Meg Ryan (Nicole Sullivan); a lawyer (Pat Kilbane) cracks jokes while being interviewed about his client's (Debra Wilson) case; in a sequel to the family drama Stepmom, a man (Michael McDonald) and his children replace his frumpy wife (Alex Borstein) with a younger, hotter woman (Debra Wilson).
84	18	Bret "The Hitman" Hart, Michael Buffer, Roddy Piper	February 27, 1999
Nicole Sullivan and Aries Spears open the show by expressing their true feelings towards each other; woodworker Paul Timberman (Will Sasso) suffers accidents while building a Lazy Susan; the Vancome Lady (Nicole Sullivan) stars in a parody of Jay-Z's "Hard Knock Life" co-starring rapper Mase (Aries Spears); Lida (Nicole Sullivan) and Melina (Debra Wilson) host their own news show; wealthy socialites (Alex Borstein, Andrew Bowen, Michael McDonald, Nicole Sullivan) play the (literal) poor man's Monopoly board game, "Welfare;" Will Sasso competes with Bret Hart in an arm-wrestling match; Stuart Larkin (Michael McDonald) gets his picture taken; a blaxploitation parody called Son of Dolemite airs.
85	19	Keri Russell	March 13, 1999
Cher (Mo Collins) opens the show with a new song; Mike Tyson (Aries Spears) becomes the new spokesman for GAP clothing; a Spanish-language version of All in the Family airs; UBS guy Jaq (Phil LaMarr) rents pornography and Teletubbies episodes for a bachelor's party; Stuart Larkin (Michael McDonald) learns how to play Tee-ball; Aries Spears reviews his day with Michael McDonald in his "Snapshot Story;" Keri Russell stars in a parody of Felicity with several Mad TV recurring characters (Alex Borstein, Michael McDonald, Nicole Sullivan); a telegram-singing couple (Pat Kilbane, Nicole Sullivan) pester another couple (Andrew Bowen, Debra Wilson); the Eracists (Alex Borstein, Will Sasso, Aries Spears, Nicole Sullivan) sing about letting homosexuals march in a St. Patrick's Day parade; Lil' Nestor (voice of Nicole Sullivan) goes ice skating; Desperation Lee (Phil LaMarr), Redd Foxx (Aries Spears), Cocoa Latite (Debra Wilson), and Kenny Rogers (Will Sasso) star in a parody of Armageddon.
86	20	TBA	March 27, 1999
Ms. Swan (Alex Borstein) opens the show with a magic trick; Fess Weiss (Pat Kilbane) sings a tale about a Paul Bunyan-like lumberjack (Will Sasso) who cleans outhouses; Yassir Arafat (Andrew Bowen) performs party tricks; a man (Pat Kilbane) refuses to stop dry-humping his wife (Alex Borstein); Keith Richards (Pat Kilbane) promotes illicit drugs as a sleep aid; Rusty Miller (Michael McDonald) appears in a commercial for a fast-food joint; a pool hustler (Will Sasso) doesn't think his plan through when betting a lot of money against himself; Catwoman (Debra Wilson) fights the cable man (Aries Spears) to get her cable TV installed; Happy Folger (Michael McDonald) embarrasses his granddaughter (Alex Borstein) at her wedding with a raunchy story. Absent: Mo Collins
87	21	TBA	April 10, 1999
Andrew Bowen opens the show by inviting Bunifa (Debra Wilson) onstage; Debra Wilson promotes a new anti-masturbation aid; in a new sitcom, a daughter (Alex Borstein) loses her boyfriends to her irresistible gay dad (Andrew Bowen); Mickey (Michael McDonald) gets fired for annoying his co-workers with his bad jokes; army specialists (Alex Borstein, Andrew Bowen, Phil LaMarr, Nicole Sullivan) observe a rubber-like man (Pat Kilbane); the red and yellow M&M's, the Energizer Bunny, and the Budweiser Chameleon are featured in a new installment of Clops; coffee addict Stan (Pat Kilbane) is nervous when he sees Janeane Garofalo (Alex Borstein) at a bistro; Kenny Rogers (Will Sasso) offers exams for testicular cancer; the Rocket Revengers (Pat Kilbane, Phil LaMarr, Will Sasso) fight the Super German (Andrew Bowen); all Tammany (Will Sasso) wants to talk about is Hollywood. Absent: Mo Collins
88	22	Jerry Springer	May 1, 1999
Jerry Springer opens the show with Ms. Swan (Alex Borstein); a Spanish-language version of Star Trek airs; a VH1 Behind the Music special examines the lives of the Eracists (Alex Borstein, Will Sasso, Aries Spears, Nicole Sullivan) after Steve (Phil LaMarr) left the group; Rosie O'Donnell (Alex Borstein) interviews shock jock Howard Stern (Pat Kilbane); Jerry Springer interviews Lida (Nicole Sullivan) and Melina (Debra Wilson) on his show, and is later accosted by meter maid Bunifa (Debra Wilson) as he leaves the studio; now overweight stars Sharon Gless (Mo Collins) and Tyne Daly (Alex Borstein) reprise their roles as Cagney & Lacey; Spishak claims one out of ten customers prefers its new laundry detergent; Shaunda (Alex Borstein) performs at a prison with Wayne Newton (Will Sasso); the Crack-o-Cola polar bears have a thrust for blood.
89	23	TBA	May 8, 1999
Kenny Rogers (Will Sasso) and James Brown, Jr. (Aries Spears) open the show; George Jefferson (Phil LaMarr) moves further on up in a parody of The Jeffersons; Ms. Swan (Alex Borstein) stars in a film noir parody in which she flirts with a private eye (Pat Kilbane); the Aussie Hunter (voice of Will Sasso) and his wife (voice of Alex Borstein) get mauled by crocodiles, sharks, and cheetahs; an elderly pharmacy employee (Debra Wilson) embarrasses other people (Alex Borstein, Andrew Bowen, Aries Spears, Nicole Sullivan) by reading their prescriptions aloud; Debra Wilson tells her "Snapshot Story;" the Rocket Revengers (Pat Kilbane, Phil LaMarr, Will Sasso) do battle in Atlantica with the help of their new member (Aries Spears); a handicapped repairman (Phil LaMarr) fumbles around while fixing a woman's (Nicole Sullivan) apartment. Absent: Mo Collins, Michael McDonald
90	24	Donny Osmond	May 15, 1999
Stuart Larkin (Michael McDonald) and his mother Doreen (Mo Collins) open the show with Will Sasso; a parody of Whose Line is It Anyway called Whose Idea Was It Anyway features Magic Johnson (Aries Spears), Cher (Mo Collins), Luke Perry (Pat Kilbane), and Ray Charles (Phil LaMarr) as players; a man (Michael McDonald) keeps shushing his girlfriend (Nicole Sullivan) and her friend (Mo Collins); Mo Collins tells her "Snapshot Story;" Rusty Miller (Michael McDonald) is ecstatic to meet his idol Donny Osmond on MTV FANatic; Lorraine Swanson (Mo Collins) bothers an employee (Michael McDonald) at a grocery store; superheroes Falconman (Andrew Bowen) and Birdboy (Phil LaMarr) bring order to the workplace.
91	25	TBA	May 22, 1999
Celine Dion (Nicole Sullivan) opens the show with a joke; Spishak promotes a new product for managing ice; the Aussie Hunter (voice of Will Sasso) and his wife (voice of Alex Borstein) get mauled by gorillas, elephants, and fire ants; competitors (Mo Collins, Debra Wilson) pass gas during a dance competition; the "News at 6" team (Alex Borstein, Phil LaMarr, Michael McDonald, Will Sasso, Nicole Sullivan) reports on an allergy attack; Marvin Tikvah (Michael McDonald) enlists the aid of the Vancome Lady (Nicole Sullivan); a couple (Michael McDonald, Nicole Sullivan) trades insults while hosting their own talk show from their bedroom; Morgan Freeman (Phil LaMarr) gets hounded by a delivery man (Aries Spears) trying to make it big in Hollywood; Lorraine Swanson (Mo Collins) takes hours shopping for a car. Notes: Andrew Bowen's last episode as a cast member.

== Home releases ==
Season four of Mad TV was released on DVD on November 12, 2013 by Shout! Factory.

The streaming version that was shown on HBO Max and is now on Howdy and Tubi omits episodes 1, 11, and 24.
