= Elvira's Haunted Hills =

2001 film directed by Sam Irvin

- Theatrical release poster
- Directed by: Sam Irvin
- Written by: Cassandra Peterson; John Paragon
- Produced by: Mark Pierson
- Starring: Elvira; Richard O'Brien; Mary Scheer; Scott Atkinson; Mary Jo Smith; Heather Hopper
- Cinematography: Viorel Sergovici
- Edited by: Stephen Myers
- Music by: Eric Allaman
- Production companies: MediaPro Studios; Queen B Productions; The Elvira Movie Company
- Distributed by: The Elvira Movie Company
- Release dates: June 23, 2001 (International Rocky Horror Fan Convention); October 31, 2002 (United States)
- Running time: 90 minutes
- Country: United States
- Language: English
- Budget: $1.5 million

Elvira's Haunted Hills is a 2001 American comedy horror film directed by Sam Irvin and written by Cassandra Peterson and John Paragon. The second film starring Peterson in the title role (credited as Elvira), after the 1988 theatrical release Elvira: Mistress of the Dark, it also stars Richard O'Brien, Mary Scheer, and Scott Atkinson.

== Plot ==
In 1851 in the Carpathian Mountains of Romania, Elvira and her unpaid maidservant Zou Zou, on their way to a can-can revue in Paris, are thrown out of an inn for failing to pay their bill. After making their way out of the village, the women meet Dr. Bradley Bradley, a psychiatrist who takes them to stay at Castle Hellsubus, in the hills high above the village.

Upon arrival at the castle, Elvira meets the residents—Lord Vladimere Hellsubus, his wife, Lady Ema, and his hypochondriac niece, Lady Roxana. They are astonished by Elvira's striking resemblance to Vladimere's first wife, Lady Elura, who died ten years earlier. Bradley explains to Elvira that the Hellsubus family is cursed and tells her he will send his carriage to take her to Paris the next morning. Later that night, Elvira lets Roxana join her and Zou Zou on their trip to Paris so she can escape the family curse. Elvira also meets the handsome stableman, Adrian, who reveals that Elura committed suicide and that Vladimere blames himself for her death.

The next morning, Elvira, Zou Zou, and Roxana prepare to leave for Paris, but Bradley has already left for the village to treat its plague-stricken inhabitants. Elvira follows a cloaked figure to a cemetery in the woods and finds Vladimere, who explains that Elura slowly descended into insanity shortly after moving into the castle, eventually committing suicide by jumping from the top of the castle tower. Vladimere suddenly attempts to strangle Elvira, mistaking her with Elura. After Elvira knees Vladimere in the groin, he comes to his senses with no memory of his actions.

At dinner, when Bradley uses hypnosis on Elvira, she is briefly possessed by Elura's spirit, who vows revenge against Vladimere. Later that night, Vladimere is awakened by an apparition of Elura. He insists that Elura is alive and has her coffin exhumed, which turns out to be empty, much to everyone's surprise. In shock, Roxana apparently dies. Later, Elvira sneaks out to meet Adrian in the stables, where they have sex. Elvira has a nightmare in which Vladimere beheads his brother Nicolae after catching him in bed with Elura; Vladimere then buries Elura alive behind a brick wall.

Sneaking down to the dungeon, Elvira finds Zou Zou trapped in a cage and discovers the brick wall from her nightmare, which she breaks down to reveal Elura's remains. Vladimere appears and confesses to killing Elura because she intended to leave him for his brother. He chases Elvira before she incapacitates him by kneeing him in the groin. Ema and Bradley enter the dungeon, revealing themselves to be lovers plotting to drive Vladimere insane and steal the Hellsubus family jewels. Bradley captures Elvira before Vladimere regains consciousness, knocks Bradley out and traps Ema in an iron maiden.

Vladimere straps Elvira to a table beneath a huge razor-sharp pendulum hanging from the ceiling. Elvira frees herself, and as Vladimere attacks her, Roxana leaps onto his back and blinds him before she is crushed by the machinery's gears. Shortly after Vladimere is killed by his own pendulum, Adrian comes to Elvira's aid. They free Zou Zou and flee the castle as it begins to crumble. Bradley leaves Ema to die and is crushed to death between the broken crumbling stairs while trying to steal the family jewels. Revealing that Ema is his illegitimate half-sister, Adrian runs back inside to save her but is killed by falling debris. The castle collapses, and Elura's spirit thanks Elvira for freeing her.

That night, Elvira and Zou Zou hitch a ride in a mysterious stagecoach. After the women explain to the man in the stagecoach what happened in the castle, the man reveals that Castle Hellsubus was destroyed 100 years earlier. Elvira and Zou Zou are left confused as the coachman is revealed to be Vladimere, who laughs maniacally.

== Cast ==
- Cassandra Peterson as Elvira / Lady Elura Hellsubus
- Richard O'Brien as Lord Vladimere Hellsubus
- Mary Scheer as Lady Ema Hellsubus
- Scott Atkinson as Dr. Bradley Bradley
- Mary Jo Smith as Zou Zou
- Heather Hopper as Lady Roxana Hellsubus
- Gabriel Andronache as Adrian
  - Rob Paulsen as Adrian's voice (uncredited)
- Jerry Jackson as the English gentleman
- Theodor Danetti as the innkeeper
- Lucia Maier as the maid
- Remus Cernat as Nicolae Hellsubus

== Production ==
Elvira's Haunted Hills was independently made and privately funded; Peterson and then-husband Mark Pierson mortgaged their house and the apartment building they co-owned to raise $1 million, with donations from relatives providing the remaining $500,000. Filming took place in Transylvania, Romania, and the film was promoted at film festivals and horror/sci-fi conventions.

The film parodies the Roger Corman-directed Edgar Allan Poe films of the early 1960s – dedicated to the memory of the then-recently deceased Vincent Price – as well as the British horror films from Hammer Studios. Atkinson's character is clearly evocative of Price, who starred in many of the Poe films.

The film opened on the July 5, 2001 weekend at the Laemmle Fairfax Cinemas in Los Angeles after premiering at the International Rocky Horror Fan Convention on 23 June 2001. It was released direct-to-video on 31 October 2002.

== Reception ==
On the review aggregator website Rotten Tomatoes, 71% of 14 critics' reviews are positive. Metacritic, which uses a weighted average, assigned the film a score of 48 out of 100, based on 7 critics, indicating "mixed or average" reviews.

In an unfavorable review, Ty Burr in the Boston Globe rated it as "A sloppy slapstick throwback to long gone bottom-of-the-bill fare like The Ghost and Mr. Chicken." In his review for The New York Post, Lou Lumenick wrote that it is "more entertaining than much of the big-studio schlock out there."

Ian Jane of DVD Talk wrote in 2011 that "if (...) isn't a classic it's amusing enough for what it is, and that's a playful, harmlessly sexy parody." Also in 2011, on IGN, Rl Shaffer called it "a mess. It also holds a small place in my heart as the first film I ever walked out on. (...) But if you're an Elvira fan (...) is a must-watch."

Cody Hamman of Joblo.com wrote that "Haunted Hills is seen as inferior, but the truth is, it’s just different."

== Awards ==
- 2002 Provincetown International Film Festival: Best Feature – Audience Award

== Home media ==
The film received a new 4K restoration/transfer by Shout! Studios in 2021. Despite the high resolution transfer, the film was released on Blu-ray rather than Ultra HD Blu-ray. It was released in the United Kingdom by 101 Films in 2024.

== See also ==
- List of films about witchcraft
- List of horror films of 2001
- List of comedy horror films
