= Mad Kids =

American children's magazine

- Cover of the December 2005 issue

Mad Kids was DC Comics' spin-off of Mad.

Between 16 November 2005 and 2009, there were 14 issues of Mad Kids, a publication aimed at a younger demographic. Reminiscent of Nickelodeon Magazine, it emphasized current kids' entertainment (e.g. Yu-Gi-Oh!, Pokémon, SpongeBob SquarePants), albeit with an impudent voice.

== Content ==
Much of the content of Mad Kids had originally appeared in the parent publication; reprinted material was chosen and edited to reflect grade schoolers' interests. But the quarterly magazine also included newly commissioned articles and cartoons, as well as puzzles, bonus inserts, a calendar and other activity-related content common to kids' magazines.
