= Duck Edwing =

American cartoonist (1934-2016)

Don "Duck" Edwing
- Born: 1934; Brooklyn, New York, US
- Died: December 26, 2016 (aged 81–82)
- Occupation(s): Gag Cartoonist, Writer
- Known for: Work in Mad magazine

Don "Duck" Edwing (1934 – December 26, 2016) was an American gag cartoonist whose work has appeared for years in Mad. His signature "Duck Edwing" was usually accompanied by a small picture of a duck, and duck calls were heard on his answering machine. Mad editor John Ficarra said, "He's exactly how people picture a Mad magazine writer." In 2007, Edwing told an interviewer, "I always believed that when you choose your field, you should specialize. You never deviate. I chose 'sick puppy'."

== Early life and career ==
Born in Brooklyn, New York, Edwing began drawing at age nine. He started making the rounds with his cartoons after leaving the navy in 1958, receiving $5 for his first sale in 1960. His 49-year tenure with Mad spanned six decades, beginning with his first two gag cartoons for the magazine: an installment of the recurring "Scenes We'd Like to See" feature and a sequence called "Nuclear Jitters," both from Mad #70 (April 1962). His last piece appeared in the 515th issue in 2012.

Before drawing his own cartoons, Edwing was the uncredited writer for many of Don Martin's cartoon gags. During Don Martin's final decade with Mad, Edwing began receiving a writer's byline for many of Martin's cartoons, as well as new material from Martin's paperback books. An example from 1986 is "Early One Evening In Las Vegas," in which a man finds that the only way to summon the fire department is to put a dollar bill in an alarm box which is built like a gambler's slot machine. With the exception of a single page of art in 1975, Edwing was exclusively a writer at Mad for more than a dozen years before becoming an occasional illustrative contributor in the early 1980s. After Martin left Mad in late 1987, Edwing effectively replaced him as the magazine's one-page gag cartoonist.

Following Martin's death in 2000, Edwing was asked about their working relationship:

Martin and I corresponded mostly with phone calls. The Mad editors did all the work by putting us together. I merely cheered Don up on a daily basis by telling him jokes, which had nothing to do with the work in front of him. I marveled at how he would take my chicken scratch sketches of a gag and transform them into a 2-D, animated, spectacular scene. The man was a major talent... l miss him.

== Other work ==
Edwing also wrote Spy vs. Spy for about 12 years, as well as the Spy vs. Spy syndicated comic strip, along with his own feature, Tales from the Duckside. As Mad's "bizarre biz-artist" he authored and drew 17 Mad paperbacks. He also wrote three "Spy vs. Spy" books and Don Martin's "Captain Klutz" material.

Edwing collaborated with Paul Coker Jr. on two comic strips, Lancelot and Horace and Buggy. His cartoons have appeared in Playboy, Look, The Saturday Evening Post and other magazines. Interviewed in 2002, Edwing was asked about his work outside Mad:

Dave Manak and myself just finished up working on Spy vs. Spy, the comic strip, and in the past I did a strip with Paul Coker called Horace and Buggy, about smart-ass insects, and I did some writing and artwork for Bob Thaves' Frank and Ernest. For Sweden, I did Super Sock and various lunatic Edwing characters that were highly successful adventures.

The short-lived Spy vs. Spy comic strip was a full-color Sunday strip syndicated by Tribune Media Services as part of Mad's year-long 50th-anniversary celebration. Charter subscribers included The Los Angeles Times, Seattle Post-Intelligencer, Denver Post and Atlanta Journal-Constitution. TMS Director of Creative Services Fred Schecker commented, "We're excited to represent a comic that so many newspaper readers already know and love. It is still as fresh and appealing as ever. In fact, it's aged a whole lot better than I have."

== Personal life ==
Edwing met Clair, who was known as Cluck Edwing, in Virginia in the late 1970s. They married and moved to Florida, where they lived together until her death in 2008.

Edwing created the Golden Gator Award which is given to the wives of cartoonists. In 2003, he began designing slot machines for International Game Technology, the world's largest slot machine developer.
