= Spy vs. Spy =

Comic strip created by Antonio Prohías

- Author(s): Antonio Prohías (1961–1987); Duck Edwing (1987–2000; 2002); Bob Clarke (1987–1993); George Woodbridge (1993); Dave Manak (1993–1997; 2002); Peter Kuper (in full color: 1997–2021, 2022, 2024–present)
- Current status/schedule: Ongoing
- Launch date: Mad magazine #60 (Jan. 1961)
- Publisher: DC Entertainment
- Genre(s): Political satire Slapstick comedy

Spy vs. Spy is a wordless comic strip published in Mad magazine, created in 1961 by Cuban expatriate cartoonist Antonio Prohías who drew it until 1987 when others took over. Peter Kuper has written and illustrated the strip since 1997.

A parody of the political ideologies of the Cold War, the strip debuted in Mad #60, dated January 1961. The series features two agents involved in stereotypical and comical espionage activities. One is dressed in white and the other in black, but they are otherwise identical and are particularly known for their long and beak-like heads and their white pupils and black sclera. The duo are always at war with each other, using a variety of booby traps to inflict harm on the other. The spies usually alternate between victory and defeat (sometimes both win and both lose) with each new strip.

The Spy vs. Spy characters have been featured in such media as video games and an animated television series, and in such merchandise as action figures and trading cards.

== Publication history ==
Antonio Prohías was a prolific cartoonist in Cuba known for political satire. He fled to the United States on May 1, 1960, three days before Fidel Castro's government nationalized the last of the Cuban free press. Prohías sought work in his profession and traveled to the offices of Mad magazine in New York City on July 12, 1960, with the strips, which he said he had created specifically for the magazine. After an initial rejection but ultimately a successful showing of his work and a prototype cartoon for Spy vs. Spy, Prohías was hired.

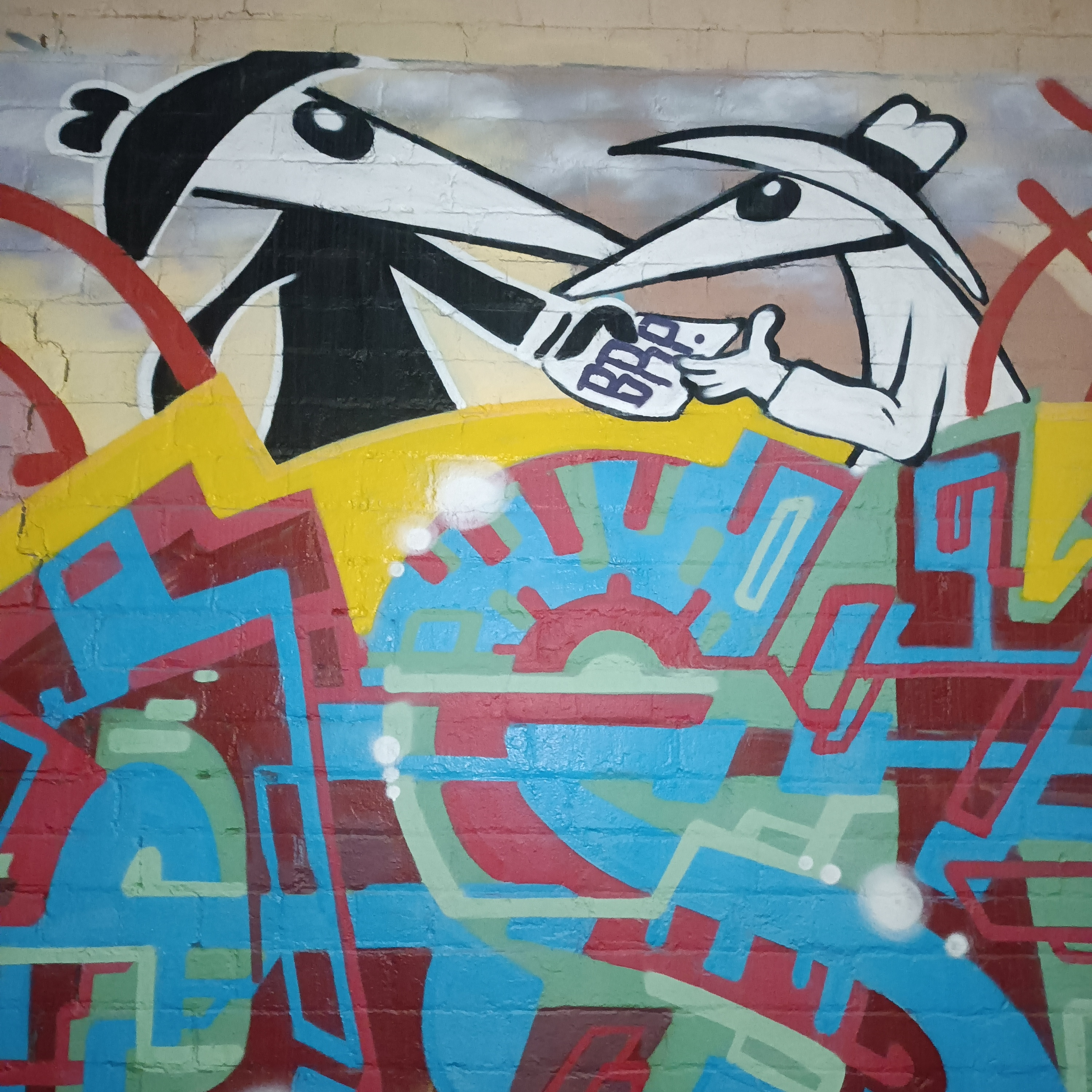
Street art of Spy vs. Spy in Sydney. 2025

Prohías cryptically signed each strip on its first panel with a sequence of Morse code characters that spell "BY PROHIAS". In a 1983 interview with the Miami Herald, Prohías reflected on the success of Spy vs. Spy, stating, "The sweetest revenge has been to turn Fidel's accusation of me as a spy into a moneymaking venture." Prohías was censored by Mad magazine publisher William Gaines on at least one occasion: the strip that eventually appeared in Mad magazine #84 (January 1964) was altered to remove scenes where the spies drink and smoke (Gaines had a strong anti-smoking stance).

Prohías evolved his drawing style over the years, making the spies' heads proportionately larger by 1964. In 1965, he began to experiment with not drawing frames on the spies' shades, and this became a consistent trait from late 1966 on, so that the characters' eyes appeared to have no sclera—just very large pupils, all black except for reflective glints. But when a spy was caught in an explosion, sometimes his fully drawn shades would fly along with other items such as hats, boots, and dentures. In the 1980s, overhanging lips were common.

Prohías completed a total of 241 Spy vs. Spy strips for Mad magazine, the last one appearing in #269 (March 1987). After that he drew gag strips for the titles (such as one involving radioactive waste in #287) and wrote several stories for Clarke or Manak to draw, with his last such contribution in #337 (July 1995).

The strips continued, with Duck Edwing writing the majority, and the illustrations usually being done by Bob Clarke or Dave Manak. Clarke's strips were identifiable through his signature of "'C/e", or "'C/p" in the Prohías-written cases. Some were largely uncredited, simply being signed "M&S" (Mad #335) or "M&e" (Mad #352).

Peter Kuper took over as the full-time writer and artist for the strip with Mad magazine #356 (April 1997). In 2001, Kuper began drawing it in full color when the magazine made its switch from black and white art. With Mad reverting to a reprint format, the initial run of Spy vs. Spy ended with issue #18 (the magazine had moved to Burbank, California in 2018, adopting new numbering starting with #1). That Spy cartoon was three pages long, and showed the spies progressing through millennia: evolving from the sea, as Greek pottery, as dueling knights, and ultimately as the only two survivors of a nuclear holocaust that they had caused. They agree to stop fighting, and walk off together arm-in-arm into the shattered ruins of civilization. Kuper returned in 2022 for the 70th Anniversary issue -- issue #28, which he had initially confirmed would be the last time he would be drawing the strip. However, starting with issue #40 in 2024, Kuper's Spy vs. Spy came back permanently.

== Characters ==
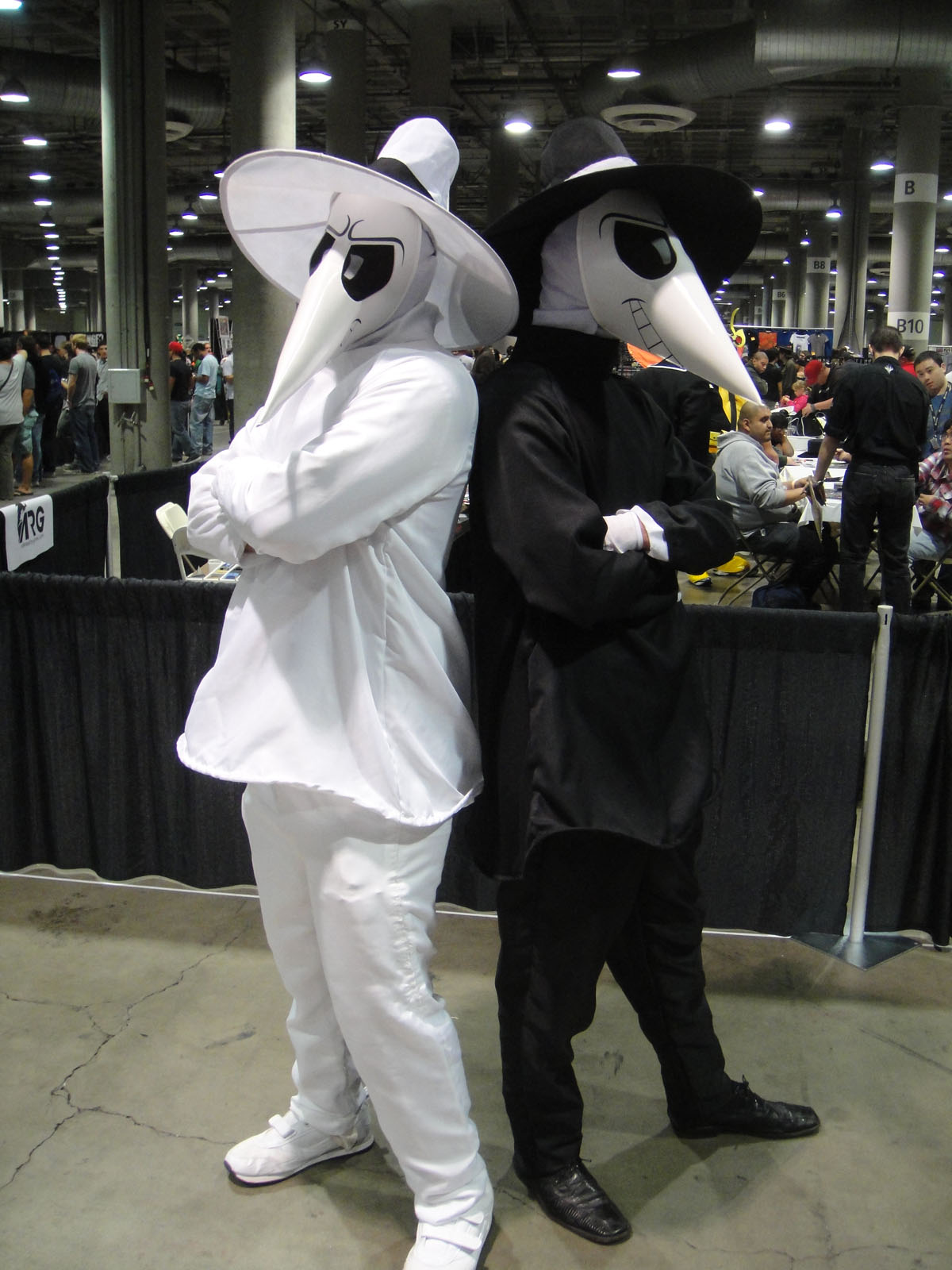
Cosplay, Comikaze Expo 2011

Black Spy and White Spy (or "Man in Black" and "Man in White") – Wearing wide-brimmed hats and dressed in overcoats, both Spies have long pointed faces. They are identical, except for one being entirely in white and one entirely in black. The Spies were modeled after El Hombre Siniestro ("The Sinister Man"), a character Prohías created in the Cuban magazine Bohemia in 1956. Like the Spies, he wore a wide-brimmed hat and overcoat and had a long, pointed nose. Prohías described the character as someone who "thought nothing of chopping the tails off of dogs, or even the legs off of little girls" and stated he was "born out of the national psychosis of the Cuban people." 'El Hombre Siniestro bore a strong resemblance to the Spies—although, instead of fighting against a set rival, he simply does horrible things to anyone he can find.

The cover copy of The All New Mad Secret File on Spy vs. Spy provides early insight to the characters and Prohías' views on the Castro regime and the CIA:

You are about to meet Black Spy and White Spy – the two MADdest spies in the whole world. Their antics are almost as funny as the CIA's. ... When it comes to intrigue, these guys make it way outtrigue. They are the only two spies we know who haven't the sense to come in out of the cold. But they have a ball – mainly trying to outwit each other.

A gag panel in Mad magazine #122 (Oct. 1968) established Black Spy as a member of the "East." He gets trapped by a White Spy, who is guarding the border to the "West." There is otherwise no indication in the series that Black Spy is pro-communist or White Spy is pro-capitalist.

Grey Spy (or "Woman in Grey") – She debuted in Mad magazine #73 (Sept. 1962) (the strip was temporarily renamed Spy vs. Spy vs. Spy). Grey Spy's appearances are sporadic, but she always triumphs by using the infatuations of Black Spy and White Spy to her advantage. Prohías explained, "The lady Spy represented neutrality. She would decide on White Spy or Black Spy, and she also added some balance and variety to the basic 'Spy vs. Spy' formula." Grey Spy's last appearance under Prohías was Mad magazine #99 (Dec. 1965); she did not appear again until 1988, after Bob Clarke and Duck Edwing took over the strip. Peter Kuper also used her occasionally.

Leaders – They are the barrel-chested, medal-decorated bosses of Black Spy and White Spy, who give them tasks and punish them for their failures. The Leaders were phased out when Peter Kuper took over writing and illustrating the strip.

== Spin-offs ==
- A Sunday strip series (39 in total) was released weekly from April 7 to Dec 29, 2002; 2014 in the MAD news, syndicated by Tribune Media Services and featuring Duck Edwing and Dave Manak returning as writer and artist respectively.
- A series of thirteen strips (plus a flip-book) titled Spy vs. Spy Jr. were published in Mad Kids magazine from 2005 to 2009. It depicts the three Spies as children, playing harmless practical jokes on each other. It appeared in every Mad Kids issue.

== Other media ==
White Spy as seen in a 2004 Mountain Dew television commercial.

- Video games based on the strip have been released for the ZX Spectrum, Commodore 64, Atari 8-bit computers, Nintendo Entertainment System, Master System, Game Boy, and Apple II. In 1997 GT Interactive announced that it would publish a "Spy vs. Spy" game for the PC in early 1998, but it was cancelled.
- A "Spy vs. Spy" board game was released by Milton Bradley in 1986.
- Animated segments of Spy vs. Spy appear in the unaired 1974 Mad Magazine Television Special, and in the first five seasons of Mad TV (1995 until 2000) with animation by Rough Draft Studios.
- In 2004, the characters were featured in television commercials for the soft drink Mountain Dew.
- "Spy vs. Spy" was a skit in every episode of Cartoon Network's animated series Mad. It ran from September 6, 2010 – December 2, 2013 (there is one skit per episode; in total, there are 103 short skits in 103 episodes), including themed skits depending on the time the episode first aired (i.e. a Christmas or Halloween theme). In the first season, the skits were drawn in styles based on the illustrations by Prohías, Clarke, and Manak; the second season introduced a new three-dimensional stop-motion animation style - these skits were animated by Stoopid Buddy Stoodios (the team behind Robot Chicken). For the remaining two seasons of the show, the shorts were produced exclusively in stop-motion. The sketches follow the style of the comic (many of them being adapted directly from the comics), with one spy being outwitted by the other, and many of them adapted actual installments of the comic, like the Mad TV shorts. Both spies claimed victory 51 times each, and one of their feuds resulted in a draw.
  - In addition, the aforementioned Robot Chicken spoofed Spy vs. Spy twice. In the Season 2 episode "Password: Swordfish", a skit based around the aforementioned Mountain Dew ads sees White Spy attempting to trounce his adversary by hiding a spring-loaded boxing glove in a soda vending machine, only for Black Spy to simply approach him from behind, shoot him dead, and steal his top-secret plans, rather than using a more elaborate counter-plot as seen in the comic strips. The Season 7 episode "Panthropologie" features a short sketch where Black Spy enacts testicular torture on White Spy, a la Casino Royale.
- The characters made an appearance on an episode of Family Guy, "Spies Reminiscent of Us", wherein White Spy revealed at the headquarters of Chevy Chase and Dan Aykroyd that they had settled their differences. White Spy was voiced by Family Guy series creator Seth MacFarlane.
- A film adaptation that was to be directed by Ron Howard was planned in 2011, with a screenplay by John Kamps. Brian Grazer and David Koepp were set to produce it but the film was scrapped. In 2020, Rawson Marshall Thurber was announced to be directing and writing the screenplay. As of 2025, no further updates have been reported.

== Bibliography ==
- The All New Mad Secret File on Spy vs. Spy (Signet, 1965) – reprinted by Warner Books in 1971, and Watson-Guptill in 2009
- Spy vs. Spy Follow Up File (Signet, 1968) – reprinted by Warner Books in 1971, and Watson-Guptill in 2009
- The Third Mad Dossier of Spy vs. Spy (Warner Books, 1972)
- The Fourth Mad Declassified Papers on Spy vs. Spy (Warner Books, 1974) – reprinted by Watson-Guptill, 2009
- The Fifth Mad Report on Spy vs. Spy (Warner Books, 1978)
- Mad's Big Book of Spy vs. Spy Capers and Other Surprises (Warner Books, 1978)
- The Sixth Mad Case Book on Spy vs. Spy (Warner Books, 1982)
- Prohías' Spy vs. Spy: The Updated Files (Warner Books, 1989)
- Spy vs. Spy: The Updated Files #8 (Warner Books, 1993)
- Spy vs. Spy: The Complete Casebook (Watson-Guptill, 2001) – reprinted by DC Comics, 2011
- Spy vs. Spy: The Joke and Dagger Files (Watson-Guptill, 2007)
- Spy vs. Spy: An Explosive Celebration (Liberty Street, 2015)
- Spy Vs. Spy: The Big Blast (Time Inc. Books, 2016)
- Spy vs. Spy: Omnibus (E.C. Publications, 2023)

=== Spin-offs ===
- Amazingly Stupid MAD (MAD Cartoon Network, 2013)
- Spy vs. Spy: Casebook of Craziness (MAD Cartoon Network, 2014)
