= Don Martin (cartoonist) =

American cartoonist (1931–2000)

- Born: May 18, 1931 Paterson, New Jersey, U.S.
- Died: January 6, 2000 (aged 68) Miami, Florida, U.S.
- Area: Cartoonist
- Notable works: Cartoons for Mad magazine
- Awards: National Cartoonist Society Special Features Award (1981, 1982); Inducted into Comic Book Hall of Fame, 2004

Don Martin (May 18, 1931 – January 6, 2000) was an American cartoonist whose best-known work was published in Mad from 1956 to 1988. His popularity and prominence were such that the magazine promoted Martin as "Mad's Maddest Artist".

== Early years ==
Born on May 18, 1931, in Paterson, New Jersey, and raised in nearby Brookside and Morristown, Martin studied illustration and fine art at Newark School of Fine and Industrial Art between 1949 and 1951 and subsequently graduated from the Pennsylvania Academy of the Fine Arts in Philadelphia in 1952. In 1953, he worked briefly as a window trimmer and frame maker before providing paste ups and mechanicals for various offset printing clients and beginning his career as freelance cartoonist and illustrator. Martin's work first appeared in Mad in the September 1956 issue.

Martin suffered from eye problems his entire life. He underwent two corneal transplants: the first in 1949, at the age of 18, and the second forty years later in 1989. After the first procedure, Martin's head had to be held in place for three days by a pair of sandbags to prevent movement.

Just prior to his work with Mad, Don Martin illustrated the album covers of a few legendary jazz artists for Prestige Records, including Miles Davis' 1956 album Miles Davis and Horns (Prestige LP 7025). He also did The Art Farmer Septet (Prestige LP 7031), Sonny Stitt / Bud Powell / J.J. Johnson (Prestige LP 7024), Kai Winding's Trombone By Three (Prestige LP 7023) and Stan Getz's The Brothers (Prestige LP 7022). "They're still using these covers," Martin told the Orlando Sentinel in 1985. "I got $50." He also drew greeting cards, and illustrations for jazz and science fiction magazines.

== Career with Mad ==
Martin brought his portfolio to the Mad offices in 1956 and was immediately given an assignment. "The drawings that I first brought to them were kind of tight," he later recalled. "There was a very tight kind of design quality—I was using a very fine line. They encouraged me to loosen up a little bit and that's what I did."

Martin often was billed as "Mad's Maddest Artist". Whereas other features in Mad, recurring or otherwise, typically were headed with pun-filled "department" titles, Martin's work always was headed with only his name—"Don Martin Dept."—further fanfare presumably being unnecessary.

At his peak, each issue of Mad typically carried three Martin strips of one or two pages each. But Martin also did several longer pieces, including parodies of poems by writers like Henry Wadsworth Longfellow, Samuel Taylor Coleridge, Edgar Guest and Clement Clarke Moore, thematic collections of gags on a single subject such as Moses, superheroes or Dracula, as well as full parodies of the Gentle Ben TV series and the films Excalibur and Conan the Barbarian. He also drew some insert bonus material for "Mad Specials" such as stickers and posters.

Although Martin's contributions invariably featured outrageous events and sometimes outright violations of the laws of space-time, his strips typically had unassuming generic titles such as "A Quiet Day in the Park" or "One Afternoon at the Beach". The six-panel "The Impressionist" features a bull who becomes a famous artist by smearing an outdoor painter against his canvas and displaying his remains as an abstract design. The four-panel "One Night in the Miami Bus Terminal" presents a man who approaches a machine labeled "Change", inserts a dollar bill, and changes to a woman. In another gag, a man is flattened by a steamroller but is saved by the intervention of two passersby, who fold him as a paper airplane and throw him to the nearest hospital.

== Style and technique ==
Cover to The Mad Adventures of Captain Klutz (Signet, 1967). Art by Don Martin.

Martin's immediately recognizable drawing style (which featured bulbous noses and hinged feet) was loose, rounded, and filled with broad slapstick. His inspirations, plots, and themes were often bizarre and at times bordered on the berserk. In his earliest years with Mad, Martin used a more jagged, scratchy line. His style evolved, settling into its familiar form by 1964. It was typified by a sameness in the appearance of the characters (the punchline to a strip often was emphasized by a deadpan take with eyes half open and the mouth absent or in a tight, small circle of steadfast perplexity) and by an endless capacity for newly coined, onomatopoetic sound effects, such as "BREEDEET BREEDEET" for a croaking frog, "PLORTCH" for a knight being stabbed by a sword, or "FAGROON klubble klubble" for a collapsing building. (Martin's dedication to onomatopoeia was such that he owned a vanity license plate which read "SHTOINK", patterned after the style of his famed sound effects.)

In a 1981 interview with the magazine Cartoonist Profiles, Martin discussed his theory of sound effects:

"When other people try to write a Don Martin sound effect for me, they don't do it correctly. Most of the time they put in a bunch of arbitrary letters that don’t mean anything at all. ... I can tell that they aren't thinking about what the sound would really be like. For example, if they do somebody getting hit on the head with a crowbar, they will go 'groink.' Now, that's not a crowbar landing on the head! The sound would have a clang to it, 'pwang' or 'spwang.' 'Spwang' would mean the skull is soft, because it has a wet sound to it. The sound wouldn't be 'groink.' 'Groink' is when you put two fingers in someone's nose and pull it about six inches from the front of the face. That's 'groink'! ... It wouldn't be just a bunch of letters. I figure the sounds out. In other words, I really do think about them and each sound has its own inner logic."

His characters often had ridiculous, rhyming names such as Fester Bestertester or Fonebone (which was expanded to Freenbean I. Fonebone in at least one strip), as well as Lance Parkertip, Noted Notary Public. In this middle period, Martin created some of his most absurdist work—for example, "National Gorilla Suit Day"—an extended narrative in which a hapless character is violently assaulted by a series of attackers in various disguises, including gorillas dressed as men. Charles Taylor described Martin's unique art style:

His people are big-nosed schmoes with sleepy eyes, puffs of wiry hair, and what appear to be life preservers under the waistline of their clothes. Their hands make delicate little mincing gestures and their strangely thin, elongated feet take a 90-degree turn at the toes as they step forward. Whether they're average Joes or headhunters, Martin's people share the same physique: a tottering tower of obloids. Martin puts the bodies of these characters through every kind of permutation, treating them as much like gadgets as the squirting flowers and joy buzzers that populate his gags: glass eyes pop out from a pat on the back; heads are steamrollered into manhole-cover shapes. All of this accompanied by a Dadaist panoply of sound effects found nowhere else: shtoink! shklorp! fwoba-dap! It's unlikely Samuel Beckett was aware of Don Martin, but had he been he might have recognized a kindred spirit.

Martin's style was influenced by the works of Robert Crumb, E.C. Segar, Bill Holman, James Thurber, Milt Gross, Virgil Partch, and Saul Steinberg. His work probably reached its final peak of quality and technical detail in the late 1960s and early 1970s, though in 1985 Martin described his art style to an interviewer: "It's still evolving, it's still changing." In later years, particularly during the 1980s, he let other people write most of his gags, most notably Duck Edwing.

Concurrent with his Mad output, Martin and an assortment of writers produced a series of paperback books, to which he retained the copyrights and eventual publishing rights. For this reason, the content of these books was not included in 2007's Completely Mad Don Martin box set. Martin described his heavy workload for these projects:

Once I get the OK on the roughs I start the finished drawings. I sort of begin this stage slowly, because doing the finished work always ends up being a seven-day week. An all day, and all evening ordeal. I always anticipate I can draw the books faster than I can. That is a big mistake, since it adds a lot of anxiety, and aggravation to the project. I thought I had developed a system with the last one. I worked on the book in batches of 15 pages or so. I even kept a record to see how long it took me to do the pencils, and how long it took me to do the inks, but it still ended up being seven days a week for a couple of months. I find I have to get some momentum going when I draw. I can't work with interruptions. I like to have three or four days where I don't even leave the house on an errand. I get a lot more done that way, because I build up a head of steam.

== Post-Mad work ==
In his last years of working with Mad, Martin had a falling out with publisher William Gaines over royalties for the paperback compilations of older Mad articles and cartoons released under new omnibus titles, such as The Self-Made Mad. Gaines insisted that Martin's original page rate was for both publication in Mad and all future reprints in any format. Martin objected, claiming at one point that he had likely lost over $1 million in royalties because of this "flat rate" for this work. Martin later testified before a Congressional subcommittee on the rights of freelance artists.

With bad blood flowing in both directions, Martin left Mad in late 1987. His last contribution appeared in issue No. 277 of March 1988 ("One Special Day in the Dungeon", written by Antonio Prohías). Soon afterwards, he began cartooning for the rival humor publication Cracked, which alluded to Martin's defection from its larger competitor by billing Martin as "Cracked's Crackedest Artist". Martin's debut cover for Cracked, issue 235, was pointedly signed "©1988 D. Martin".

"As far as I could tell, he was happy," said fellow Cracked artist Dan Clowes. "I don't think he ever seemed to notice that Mad was respected, whereas Cracked was loathed."

After six years with Cracked, Martin parted company with the magazine. A year later, he launched his own short-lived publication, Don Martin Magazine. This included reprints from some of his original Mad paperbacks to which he had retained copyrights. The first issue included an otherwise nonsensical Martin "interview" conducted by Martin himself, in which he said, "My agent thinks I was nuts to have worked there [Mad] as long as I did," before expressing fondness for his time at Cracked. In 1991, Martin complained about Mad's chummy and tribal atmosphere to the Los Angeles Times, saying, "It's looked upon by the people there as a good thing, like one big family. I came to realize that it's only a good thing for Bill Gaines. I was so terribly loyal all those years that I turned down work because I had something for Mad Magazine—which is ridiculous."

From 1989 to 1993, Don Martin created a daily comic strip called The Nutheads, featuring a family that worked at "Glump's Market", a cluttered store. The characters included a mother and father, Hazel and Nutley, and their two children, Macadamia and baby Nutkin. It was briefly syndicated by Universal Press Syndicate; Martin later revived and self-syndicated the strip.

Despite a degenerative eye condition, Martin continued to draw through the 1990s using special magnifying equipment.

Martin was a member of both the National Cartoonists Society and The Graphic Artists Guild (GAG). He resigned from GAG and returned a donation from them in 1997, following a dispute.

== Personal life and death ==
In 1972, after sitting for an interview with The Miami Herald, the newspaper wanted to take a photograph of Martin and his family to accompany the piece. Martin refused. However, he then drew impromptu life-sized character masks, which Martin, his wife Rosemary, and son Max obligingly wore over their faces for the published portrait.

He remarried in 1979, taking Norma Haimes (Martin) as his new wife. Their marriage lasted until his death.

In 2000, he died of cancer in Coconut Grove, Florida, at age 68.

== Awards and honors ==
Martin was honored with the Ignatz Award at the Orlando Comicon in 1980. He received the National Cartoonists Society's Special Features Award in both 1981 and 1982, and he was inducted into the Will Eisner Award Hall of Fame in 2004.

Martin's cartoons appear in public collections at the National Cartoonists Society and the Billy Ireland Cartoon Library & Museum. He served as a juror at "Hürriyet Vakfı", an International Cartoon Competition held in Ankara, Turkey in 1986.

== Influence on popular culture ==
Martin's work has been referenced in numerous arenas, from The Simpsons and Family Guy to The Colbert Report to Jonathan Lethem's 1999 novel Motherless Brooklyn, which describes in detail the Tourette's-afflicted protagonist's affinity for Martin's cartoons. The character of Uncle Grandpa was inspired by the look of Martin's designs.

In 1986, the animated feature Don Martin Does It Again was created in Germany by director Andy Knight, and produced by Gerhard Hahn's Deutsche Zeichentrick Erste Produktions GmbH & Co. KG. It won first prize at the 1986 International Children's Film Festival in Chicago. Martin strips have also been adapted on Cartoon Network's Mad and the Fox sketch program MADtv.

The name of the Fone Bone character in cartoonist Jeff Smith's epic graphic novel Bone is derived from Fonebone, the generic surname that Martin gave to many of the characters that appeared in his Mad magazine strips.

In episode No. 307, "The Day the Earth Stood Stupid" (2001), of Matt Groening's science-fiction animated television series Futurama, lead character Hermes Conrad mentions a planet called "Don Martin 3" that went "kerflooey", an homage to one of Martin's sound effects. The "Stranded in Space" film shown on TV's Mystery Science Theater 3000 (episode 305) included various visual weapon sound effects (e.g., a gun with a flag which pops out, bearing the sound effect "BANG!"). After a stick of dynamite produced a banner reading "KACHOW", one of the show's characters wondered, "Kachow? Kachow?! What, is Don Martin working with you guys now?!"

In 2007, a two-volume hardcover box set of Martin's complete Mad magazine work was published by Running Press.

Taking their cue from one of Martin's more celebrated stories, National Gorilla Suit Day, fans have celebrated National Gorilla Suit Day by wearing gorilla suits on January 31. No specific date is given in the story, which appeared in the 1963 paperback book Don Martin Bounces Back.

== Books ==
- Don Martin Steps Out (1962)
- Don Martin Bounces Back (1963)
- Don Martin Drops 13 Stories (1965)
- Adventures of Captain Klutz (1967)
- Don Martin Cooks up More Tales (1969)
- Don Martin Comes on Strong (1971)
- Don Martin Carries On (1973)
- The Completely Mad Don Martin (1974)
- Don Martin Steps Further Out (1975)
- Don Martin Forges Ahead (1977)
- Don Martin Digs Deeper (1979)
- Don Martin Grinds Ahead (1981)
- Captain Klutz II (1983)
- Don Martin Sails Ahead (1986)

== See also ==
- Captain Klutz
