= Mary Scheer =

American actress (born 1963)

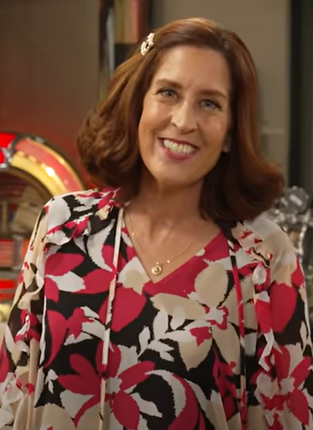
- Scheer in 2022
- Born: March 19, 1963 (age 63); Detroit, Michigan, U.S.
- Occupations: Actress; comedian; producer; writer
- Years active: 1988–present
- Spouse: Bob Bush (m. 1992)
- Children: 2

Mary Scheer (born March 19, 1963) is an American actress, comedian, screenwriter, and producer, best known for her work in television. She had recurring roles as Marissa Benson on the Nickelodeon sitcom iCarly and as Gladys on the Disney Channel series Bunk'd. She voiced Alice the Zookeeper on DreamWorks animated series The Penguins of Madagascar, was part of the original cast on the sketch comedy show Mad TV, voiced every female character on Most Extreme Elimination Challenge and appeared in GEICO commercials.

== Career ==
She is known for playing comedic characters in sitcoms, movies, and cartoons.

=== Mad TV ===
Scheer was one of the original nine cast members of Mad TV when the series debuted in 1995. She came to the show with a background in sketch comedy from her days with The Groundlings. During her tenure, Scheer developed characters such as the chain-smoking Mrs. Jewel Barone, Cabana Chat host Dixie Wetsworth, Connie Linder, Debbie Dander, Lily Don, and Mrs. Vigor (Killer Grandma).

Scheer also performed impressions of celebrities and public figures during her tenure on Mad TV, some of which included U.S. Attorney General Janet Reno, Demi Moore, Susan Sarandon, Kathy Griffin, Mary Tyler Moore, Ashley Olsen, Candice Bergen, Fran Drescher, Shirley MacLaine, Emma Thompson, Sherry Stringfield, Frances Bavier, Irene Vernon, Ashley Judd, Victoria Beckham and Barbara Feldon. Other impersonations include Barbra Streisand in the Mad TV spoof video "Terms Of Imprisonment", where she portrays Streisand as an egomaniac who abuses her co-star, Whitney Houston and Gillian Anderson's Dana Scully in the "XXX Files" sketch. Towards the end of the second season, Scheer became pregnant and was visibly pregnant at the beginning of the third season, continuing to perform on the show. After giving birth, Scheer finished the third season before leaving in 1998.

==== Characters ====
Character	Sketch	Season of first appearance	Catch phrase	Notes
Mrs. Jewel Barone	The Smoker	1	"Oh yeah, there it is."	She is a habitual smoker who seems to have a negative effect on everyone around her (physically and mentally) because of her smoking.
Dixie Wetsworth	Cabana Chat	2	"You like? I like."	She is an aging talk show host who has undergone several plastic surgeries.
Connie Linder	Joel & Connie	1		
Debbie Dander		1		
Lily Don	Joe & Lily Don	1		
Mrs. Vigor	Killer Grandma	1		

=== Other projects ===
Besides Mad TV, Scheer has appeared in several other television shows. Her credits include Reno 911!, Primetime Glick, X-Chromosome, Free Ride, and Dropping Out. She had a recurring role on the Nickelodeon sitcom iCarly as Marissa Benson, the extremely overprotective mother of Nathan Kress's character Freddie Benson. The show ran from September 8, 2007, to November 23, 2012. She also reprised the same role for the iCarly reboot on Paramount+.

After leaving Mad TV, she appeared in the films Elvira's Haunted Hills, The New Women, Chump Change, and It Can Always Get Worse Kathy, from 2001 to 2005. She also starred as Gladys, the grumpy and lonely camp director of Camp Kikiwaka in the first 2 seasons of Bunk'd.

Besides her on-screen appearances, Scheer has also become a voice actress, lending her voice to numerous commercials and several animated projects, including Family Guy and King of the Hill. Scheer's voice also appears in the animated feature film Batman Beyond: Return of the Joker. Scheer performed all female voices in Spike TV's humorous game show MXC (she was credited as portraying Everygirl). In season four, she became MXC's supervising producer.

Scheer also appeared on the Jennette McCurdy web series What's Next for Sarah? as Sarah's therapist.

== Filmography ==
=== Film ===
Year	Title	Role	Notes
1988	The New Adventures of Pippi Longstocking	American Dubbing Team	
1989	L.A. on $5 a Day	Homeless woman	
1991	The Chick's a Dick	Snapdragon	
1994	It's Pat	Nurse	
1995	Ding Dong	Doris Pritt	
1995	Not of This Earth	Saleswoman	
2000	Chump Change	Agent #2	
2001	The New Women	Nancy	
2001	Elvira's Haunted Hills	Lady Ema Hellsubus	
2005	It Can Always Get Worse	Kathy	
2019	Between Two Ferns: The Movie	Frannie Scheindlin	

=== Television ===
Year	Title	Role	Notes
1993	Quantum Leap	Other Woman	Episode: "Dr. Ruth - April 25, 1985"
1994	Beverly Hills, 90210	Marcia Ramsden	
1995	Party of Five	Ms. Shaver	
1995–1998	Mad TV	Various characters	Sketch comedy series; credited in 66 episodes
1995, 1998	Seinfeld	Mrs. Smoth, Joan	2 episodes
1998–2005	All That	Various	
2000	Dropping Out	Betty Brockton	
2001	Primetime Glick	Various Characters	
2001	X-Chromosome		
2003	Reno 911!	Tina the Daycare Owner	
2006	Free Ride	Aunt Louise	
2007–2012	iCarly	Marissa Benson	Recurring role; 28 episodes
2007	Halfway Home	Alan's Wife	Episode: "Halfway Innocent"
2007	The Suite Life of Zack & Cody	Ms. Laura Bird	Episode: "Summer Of Our Discontent"
2009	Hannah Montana	Norma	Episode: "Can't Get Home To You Girl"
2010	Good Luck Charlie	Patricia	Episode: "Teddy's Broken Heart Club Band"
2010	Nick Swardson's Pretend Time	Paula	Episode: "The Leather Swingset with the Monkey and the Gun"
2014	Sam & Cat	Marissa Benson	Episode: "#TheKillerTunaJump: #Freddie #Jade #Robbie"
2014	2 Broke Girls	Lois	Episode: "And the Dumpster Sex"
2015–2017	Bunk'd	Gladys	Recurring role; 13 episodes
2016	Life in Pieces	Marta Pigeon	Episode: "Hair Recital Rainbow Mom"
2017	Julie's Greenroom	Groundlings Theater Director	Episode: "Morning at the Improv"
2021–2023	iCarly	Marissa Benson	Recurring role

=== Voice acting appearances ===
Year	Title	Role	Notes
1995	Freakazoid!	Sandra Danger	Episode: "Toby Danger in Doomsday Bet"
1996–2002	Hey Arnold!	Suzie Kokoshka, various	14 episodes
1997	Lands of Lore: Guardians of Destiny	Various Characters	Video game
1997–2002	King of the Hill	Ms. Bittner, Bank Teller, Gracie	2 episodes
1999	Family Guy	Ann Landers, Mary, Mother	2 episodes
1999	The Angry Beavers	Computer, TV Actress	Episode: "Long Tall Daggy/Practical Jerks"
2000	Batman Beyond: Return of the Joker	Mrs. Drake	
2002	Invader Zim	Yoa	
2003–2007	MXC	Female voices ("Everygirl")	Formerly Most Extreme Elimination Challenge; also producer
2009–2015	The Penguins of Madagascar	Alice the Zookeeper, Machine Voice, Female Doctor, additional voices	
2020	Twin Mirror	Tara	Video game

=== Web series ===
Year	Title	Role	Notes
2014	What's Next for Sarah?	Sarah's therapist	Also plays other characters

== Personal life ==
Scheer married her husband Bob Bush on October 10, 1992. Together they have two children, a daughter, Abigail (b. October 1, 1997), who is a theatre actress and opera singer and a son, Nate (b. June 15, 2002).
