= Mary Elizabeth Williams =

American writer and commentator

Mary Elizabeth Williams is an American writer and commentator. She is a former staff writer for the online magazine Salon. She has also written for The New York Times, The Nation, and other publications. As a commentator, she has made appearances on MSNBC, Today, and NBC Nightly News.

In 2009, Williams released a memoir titled Gimme Shelter.

== Personal life ==
Mary Elizabeth Williams grew up in Jersey City, New Jersey. She has described herself as an ex-Catholic.

In August 2010, Williams was diagnosed with melanoma and underwent surgery. In August 2011, she was rediagnosed with stage IV melanoma. Later that year, she entered a stage I clinical trial for an experimental immunotherapy cancer drug, with which she had significant success and has remained in remission as of 2019. Williams has documented her experiences with cancer on Salon and in her book A Series of Catastrophes and Miracles: A True Story of Love, Science, and Cancer, published in 2016.
