= Corky and the Juice Pigs =

Canadian comedy musical group

- Origin: Windsor, Ontario, Canada
- Genres: Comedy, folk
- Years active: 1987–c. 1998
- Members: Phil Nichol; Greg Neale; Seán Cullen

Corky and the Juice Pigs was a Canadian comedy musical group made up of Phil Nichol (guitar and vocals), Greg Neale (mandolin and vocals), and Seán Cullen (harmonica and vocals). Their output consisted mainly of original comedic songs, largely satirical and often parodying various musical styles.

== History ==
Corky and the Juice Pigs began performing on a comedy show on the University of Windsor's CJAM campus radio station. There, the group hosted a show called "Last Laughs on Us". They referred to themselves as "The Little Bits of Gravel". This line up comprised Nichol, Cullen, and Joe Costa.

After their stint on campus radio, Costa, Cullen, and Nichols entered a comedy competition hosted by Eugene Levy that was touring Canadian university campuses in the late 1980s. They joined the contest under the moniker "Corky and the Juice Pigs". Costa left the group early into their career to pursue a teaching occupation, and was replaced by Greg Neale. One of their early national Canadian TV appearances was on the MuchMusic program Much West in the late 1980s, during which they performed a parody of kabuki theatre.

The Canadian band Barenaked Ladies toured with Corky and the Juice Pigs in 1989/1990, joining them on an Eastern Canadian tour. Barenaked Ladies also opened for them several times in their hometown of Toronto.

They are best known in the United States for their performances on MADtv, including their most famous song, "Eskimo". The group has also parodied specific performers, often by performing their own songs in the style of others.

The group also toured internationally, netting a Perrier Award nomination at the Edinburgh Festival Fringe in 1993. They also attracted a loyal fan base in Australia thanks to touring in the early 1990s, an appearance on The Big Gig and airplay on radio stations such as 3PBS and 3RRR where they were regularly played on magazine-style comedy show The Cheese Shop. As a result, they still attracted sell out crowds at their last appearances at the Melbourne International Comedy Festival towards the end of their career.

== Albums ==
=== Buck a Song (1992) ===
Cassette only

1. "Jesus"
2. "Gameshow"
3. "Todd!"
4. "Pickle"
5. "C. Gameshow"
6. "Skateboard"
7. "P.S.A."
8. "Miners"
9. "Suzanne"
10. "D. Gameshow"
11. "Pandas"
12. "P.S.A. 2"
13. "Rok Stedy"

=== Corky and the Juice Pigs (1993) ===
1. "Ben"
2. "Pandas"
3. "Basketball"
4. "Gameshow 1"
5. "666-6666"
6. "P.S.A."
7. "Doubt"
8. "Skateboard"
9. "Eskimo"
10. "Todd"
11. "Concierge"
12. "P.S.A."
13. "Psycho"
14. "Buddhists"
15. "Gameshow 2"
16. "Truckers"
17. "Rok Stedy"
18. "Candy"
19. "Love Affair"
20. "P.S.A."
21. "Miners"
22. "When the Moon"
23. "Captain Greg"
24. "Suzanne"
25. "Gameshow 3"
26. "Americans"

=== Pants (1994) ===
1. "Pants"
2. "Circus Freaks"
3. "Rabies"
4. "Janitor"
5. "Enviro-Girl"
6. "Dolphin Boy"
7. "Diet Riot"
8. "Curly's Pants"
9. "The Church"
10. "Christmas Dreams"
11. "Picnic Party"
12. "French Cowboys"
13. "BVG (Burn Victim Girl)"
14. "Hot Squat Hombre"
15. "REMember"
16. "The Boot Cut"

== Filmography ==
- 1996 – A Little Off the Top
- 1996 – MadTV (guest appearance, Fox Television)
- 26 October 1998 – SketchCom (guest appearance, CBC Television)
