= List of EC Comics publications =

Entertaining Comics, commonly known as EC Comics, was a major publisher of comic books in the 1940s and 1950s. The letters EC originally stood for Educational Comics. EC's Pre-Trend titles are those published by Max Gaines and his son William M. Gaines, who took over the family business after his father's death in 1947.

In 1950, with the addition of writer and artist Al Feldstein, EC found success with their New Trend line, including their horror titles Tales From the Crypt, The Haunt of Fear and The Vault of Horror. A line of science fiction titles soon followed, Weird Science and Weird Fantasy, illustrated by the best artists in the business, such as Wallace Wood, Reed Crandall, Johnny Craig, George Evans, Graham Ingels, Jack Davis, Bill Elder, Joe Orlando, Al Williamson and Frank Frazetta. In addition to original stories, the books also featured adaptations of Ray Bradbury's short stories.

The New Direction group was a response to the Comics Code Authority. Picto-Fiction was a short-lived line of heavily illustrated short story magazines. Beginning in 1958, EC published annual and special editions of Mad.

== Publications ==
=== Pre-Trend ===
Title	Genre	Initial Run	Issues	Notes
Animal Fables	Comedy	1946–1947	#1–7	
Animated Comics (1947)	N/A	N/A	#1	
Blackstone the Magician Detective Fights Crime!	Superhero	(1947)	#1	From Blackstone Master Magician #1–3 (1946) at Vital Publications; issue numbering continued as Blackstone the Magician at Timely Comics
Crime Patrol	Crime	1948–1950	#1–16	Issues #1–5 titled as International Comics; Issue #6 titled as International Crime Patrol; Issue numbering continued as The Crypt of Terror
Dandy Comics	Comedy	1947–1948	#1–7	
Fat and Slat	Comedy	1947–1948	#1–4	Issue numbering continued as Gunfighter
Gunfighter	Western	1948–1950	#5–14	Issue numbering continued as The Haunt of Fear
Happy Houlihans	Comedy	1947	#1–2	Issue numbering continued as Saddle Justice
Land of the Lost	Adventure	1946–1948	#1–9	
Modern Love	Romance	1949–1950	#1–8	
Moon Girl	Superhero	1947–1950	#1–12	Issue #1 titled as Moon Girl and the Prince; Issues #7–8 titled as Moon Girl Fights Crime!; Issues #9–12 titled as A Moon, a Girl...Romance; Issue numbering continued as Weird Fantasy
Picture Stories from the Bible (New Testament edition)	N/A	1944–1946	#1–3	Old Testament edition published by DC Comics
Picture Stories from American History	N/A	1945–1947	#1–4	
Picture Stories from Science	N/A	1947	#1–2	
Saddle Justice	Western	1948–1950	#3–11	Issues #9-11 titled as Saddle Romances; Issue numbering continued as Weird Science
Tiny Tot Comics	Children	1946–1947	#1–10	
War Against Crime!	Crime	1948–1950	#1–11	Issue numbering continued as The Vault of Horror

=== New Trend ===
Title	Genre	Initial Run	Number of Issues
The Crypt of Terror/Tales from the Crypt	Horror	April/May 1950 to February/March 1955	30 issues
The Vault of Horror	Horror	April/May 1950 to December/January 1955	29 issues
The Haunt of Fear	Horror	May/June 1950 to November/December 1954	28 issues
Weird Fantasy	Sci-fi	May/June 1950 to November/December 1953	22 issues
Weird Science	Sci-fi	May/June 1950 to November/December 1953	22 issues
Crime SuspenStories	Crime	October/November 1950 to February/March 1955	27 issues
Two-Fisted Tales	War	November/December 1950 to February 1955	24 issues
Frontline Combat	War	July/August, 1951 to January 1954	15 issues
Shock SuspenStories	Suspense	February/March 1952 to December/January 1955	18 issues
Mad	Comedy	October–November 1952 to April 2018, rebooted June 2018 with new numbering from #1. Ceased news stand distribution in December 2019 after 10 issues. Soon after switched to mostly reprinted contents	550 issues
Three Dimensional E.C. Classics/Three Dimensional Tales from the Crypt of Terror	N/A	Spring 1954 to March 1954	2 issues
Panic	Comedy	February–March 1954 to December/January 1956	12 issues
Weird Science-Fantasy	Sci-fi	March 1954 to May/June 1955	7 issues
Piracy	Fantasy	October/November 1954 to October/November 1955	7 issues

=== New Direction ===
Title	Genre	Initial Run	Number of Issues
Impact	Suspense	March/April 1955 to Nov/Dec 1955	5 issues
Valor	Fantasy	March/April 1955 to Nov/Dec 1955	5 issues
Extra!	Slice of Life	March/April 1955 to Nov/Dec 1955	5 issues
Aces High	War	March/April 1955 to Nov/Dec 1955	5 issues
Psychoanalysis	Slice of Life	March/April, 1955 to September/October 1955	4 issues
M.D.	Slice of Life	April/May 1955 to Nov/Dec 1955	5 issue
Incredible Science Fiction	Sci-Fi	July/August 1955 to Jan/Feb 1956	4 issues

=== Picto-Fiction ===
Title	Genre	Initial Run	Number of Issues
Confessions Illustrated	Romance	February 1956 – July 1956	3 issues
Crime Illustrated	Crime	December 1955 – April 1956	2 issues
Shock Illustrated	Suspense	September/October 1955 – Spring 1956	3 issues
Terror Illustrated	Horror	November/December 1955 – Spring 1956	2 issues

=== Oni Press ===
Title	Genre	Initial Run	Number of Issues
Epitaphs From the Abyss	Horror	July 2024 – June 2025	12 issues
Cruel Universe	Science Fiction	August 2024 – December 2024	5 issues
Shiver SuspenStories	Suspense	December 2024	1 issue
Cruel Kingdom	Fantasy	January 2025 – April 2025	4 issues
Blood Type	Horror	June 2025 – September 2025	4 issues
Catacomb of Torment	Horror	July 2025 - September 2026	15 issues
Cruel Universe II	Science Fiction	August 2025 - July 2026	12 issues
Outlaw Showdown	Western	October 2025	1 issue
Shiver SuspenStories II	Suspense	December 2025	1 issue
Tortured Hearts	Despair	February 2026	1 issue
Shellshock	War	August 2026	1 issue
Cruel Kingdom II	Fantasy	September 2026 –	6 issues

=== Mad annuals and specials ===
- More Trash from Mad, 1958–1969 (12 issues)
- Worst from Mad, 1958–1969 (12 issues)
- Mad Follies, 1963–1969 (7 issues)
- Mad Special, 1970–1973 (10 issues)
- Mad Super Special, 1973–1999 (131 issues)
- Mad XL, 2000–2005 (34 issues)
- Mad Color Classics, 2000–2005 (11 issues)
- Mad Classics, 2005–2009 (25 issues)
- Mad Kids, 2005–2009 (14 issues)

=== Reprints ===
Many of these titles were reprinted during the past 30 years by publisher Russ Cochran, both independently and in conjunction with Gladstone Publishing and later with Gemstone Publishing.

Russ Cochran's reprints include The Complete EC Library in black and white but with full-color covers; EC Annuals in full-color, comic-book sized reprints with four to six complete comics in each Annual; and EC Archives, full-color hardcover books containing six complete EC comics.

In 2012 Fantagraphics Books began publishing a series of artist- and theme-based collections of EC stories titled The EC Artists' Library.

The full-color EC Archives project was taken up by Dark Horse Comics in 2013, both reprinting previous Gladstone and Gemstone volumes and producing new volumes collecting further EC Comics titles.
