= Carl Wessler =

American comics writer

- 1935 animation newsletter with caricature of Carl Wessler at work on Musical Memories
- Born: Carroll O. Wessler; May 25, 1913
- Died: April 9, 1989 (aged 75) Miami, Florida, U.S.
- Areas: Animator, Writer
- Notable works: Ghosts; House of Mystery; The Unexpected; The Witching Hour

Carroll O. Wessler (May 25, 1913 – April 9, 1989), better known as Carl Wessler, was an American animator of the 1930s and a comic book writer from the 1940s though the 1980s for such companies as DC Comics, EC Comics, Marvel Comics, and Warren Publishing.

Wessler was one of at least five staff writers (officially titled editors) under editor-in-chief Stan Lee at Marvel's 1950s forerunner, Atlas Comics.

== Biography ==
=== Early life and career ===
Wessler began as an animator in the 1930s, working on Musical Memories and other theatrical cartoon short films for the Fleischer Studios in New York City. The studio fired him on March 30, 1937, for labor union organizing; after a subsequent strike by studio staff, lasting from May 7 to October 13 of that year, the studio settled, and Wessler and others were rehired. Wessler followed Fleischer when it relocated to Florida the following year.

While continuing to work as an animator, Wessler began doing freelance art for comic books in 1943, through the studio Sangor-Hughes, a packager that produced outsourced comics for publishers entering the then-new medium. Wessler returned to New York when Fleischer relocated as Famous Studios, and he segued full-time into comics during this 1940s period fans and historians call the Golden Age of Comic Books. Due to much of his work going unsigned, in the manner of the times, comprehensive credits are difficult to ascertain; Wessler's earliest confirmed credits are as a cartoonist writing and drawing such talking animal features as "Dennis Drake" in American Comics Group's Ha Ha Comics #2 (November 1943) and "Snazzy Rabbit" and "Senorita Juanita McMouse" in Croydon Publishing/Rural Home Publishing's Laffy-Daffy Comics #1 (Feb. 1945) as well as "Mertie Mouse" "Wordless Waddles" and "Wonder Worm" in Toy Town Comics (1945). He also wrote and drew the humorous feature "Happy Daze" in at least two issues of Lev Gleason Publications' Daredevil in 1951.

=== Atlas and EC ===
Wessler began writing for Atlas Comics in November 1950 with the six-page story "The Mad Monk" about the historical figure Grigori Rasputin, published in Amazing Detective Cases #6 (May 1951). He soon became Atlas' primary crime fiction writer, often scripting entire issues of All-True Crime, Amazing Detective Cases, Crime Can't Win, Crime Exposed, Crime Must Lose, Justice, and Kent Blake of the Secret Service. Going on staff in 1952, he became a member of the Atlas bullpen with fellow writers Hank Chapman, Ernie Hart, Paul S. Newman, Don Rico and, on teen humor comics, future Mad cartoonist Al Jaffee. Wessler wrote horror/fantasy stories for such titles as Adventures into Terror, Adventures into Weird Worlds, Astonishing, Mystic, and Suspense, later adding to his body of work such war comics as Battle, Battle Action, Battlefield, Combat, and Men's Adventures.

In 1953, EC Comics—which in the 1950s produced a number of horror and dramatic titles later considered to be classics of the field—recruited Wessler, Jack Oleck, Daniel Keyes, and other writers. Wessler contributed a large number of stories to EC's famed horror titles Tales from the Crypt, and The Vault of Horror—writing the entirety of Tales from the Crypt #45 (Jan. 1955), for instance, with the artists including Graham Ingels, Jack Davis, Jack Kamen, and Bernard Krigstein. He wrote as well for EC's Aces High, Crime SuspenStories, Impact, Piracy, Shock SuspenStories and Weird Science-Fantasy.

Following the demise of EC in the wake of the newly formed Comics Code Authority's crackdown on graphically violent comic books, Wessler returned to Atlas in late 1955 as a freelance writer. There he scripted science fiction/fantasy stories for Mystic and, prolifically, World of Fantasy. His last Atlas work appeared in issue #15 of the latter, cover dated December 1958.

=== Later career ===
Wessler next wrote for Harvey Comics, home of Casper the Friendly Ghost and other children's characters, remaining there through the early 1970s. As well, in the 1960s, his work appears in a range of titles including Charlton Comics' Billy the Kid, DC Comics' American Revolutionary War-era adventure series Tomahawk, and Warren Publishing's black-and-white horror-comics magazines Creepy, Eerie and Vampirella.

At DC Comics, Wessler wrote numerous stories for the supernatural-fantasy anthologies Ghosts, House of Mystery, The Unexpected, and The Witching Hour from 1967 to 1985. He contributed additional stories to Eerie, and returned to his old home at the former Atlas, now Marvel Comics, with work appearing in Giant-Size Chillers vol. 2, #1 (Feb. 1975), and in the black-and-white horror-comics magazine Tales of the Zombie #7 and 10 (Sept. 1974 and March 1975). His last recorded credit is the story "Hellfire by Night" in G.I. Combat #278 (July 1985). Wessler was a resident of Miami, Florida, when he died on April 9, 1989.

== Bibliography ==
=== Charlton Comics ===
- Fox Hole #5 (1955)

=== DC Comics ===
- All-Out War #2, 5 (1979–1980)
- DC Special Series #4, 7, 22 (1977–1980)
- Ghosts #41–44, 46, 49–50, 59–62, 66, 68, 73, 75, 81, 83–85, 88, 90–95, 98 (1975–1981)
- G.I. Combat #180, 191, 210, 216, 224, 226, 274–275, 278 (1975–1985)
- House of Mystery #204, 278–281, 284–286 (1972–1980)
- House of Secrets #137 (1975)
- Mystery in Space #114 (1980)
- Secrets of Haunted House #15–18, 20–21, 23, 33–34, 36–37, 40, 42 (1979–1981)
- Tales of the Unexpected #104 (1967)
- Tomahawk #116–117, 129 (1968–1970)
- The Unexpected #105–107, 115, 117, 119–120, 123–125, 128–134, 136–149, 151–160, 162–165, 167, 170, 172, 175, 177–193, 195–198, 201–204, 206, 208–209, 211–212, 215 (1968–1981)
- Weird War Tales #93 (1980)
- The Witching Hour #16–18, 20, 23, 25–27, 30–36, 39–43, 45, 47–66, 68, 70–80, 83–85 (1971–1978)

=== EC Comics ===
- Aces High #1–5 (1955)
- Crime SuspenStories #23–24, 26–27 (1954–1955)
- The Haunt of Fear #24–25, 27–28 (1954)
- Impact #1–5 (1955)
- M.D. #2–4 (1955)
- Piracy #2–7 (1954–1955)
- Shock SuspenStories #14–18 (1954–1955)
- Tales from the Crypt #42–46 (1954–1955)
- Valor #1–2, 5 (1955)
- The Vault of Horror #37–40 (1954–1955)
- Weird Science-Fantasy #29 (1955)

=== Marvel Comics ===
- Adventures into Terror #10, 17 (1952–1953)
- Adventures into Weird Worlds #8–9, 19, 22 (1952–1953)
- Amazing Detective Cases #6 (1951)
- Astonishing #11, 14, 20–21, 25–27 (1952–1953)
- Battle #18 (1953)
- Battle Action #8, 10–11 (1953)
- Battlefield #9–10 (1953)
- Combat #8 (1953)
- Crime Cases Comics #7 (1951)
- Crime Exposed #7, 13 (1951–1952)
- Giant-Size Chillers #1 (1975)
- Justice #25, 37 (1952–1953)
- Man Comics #22 (1953)
- Men's Adventures #18–19 (1953)
- Mystery Tales #6 (1952)
- Mystic #9, 11, 42, 58 (1952–1957)
- Mystical Tales #6, 8 (1957)
- Strange Tales #5 (1952)
- Strange Tales of the Unusual #6 (1956)
- Suspense #10–11, 19 (1951–1952)
- Tales of the Zombie #7, 10 (1974–1975)
- War Adventures #12 (1953)
- World of Fantasy #1–2, 7, 12–15 (1956–1958)

Preceded by Leo Dorfman	Ghosts writer 1975–1981	Succeeded by various
