= M.D. (comics) =

Comic book published by EC Comics in 1955

- Cover illustration by Johnny Craig

Publication information
- Publisher: EC Comics
- Schedule: Bi-monthly
- Format: Anthology
- Publication date: April/May 1955 - December 1955/January 1956
- No. of issues: five

Creative team
- Written by: Carl Wessler (?Al Feldstein?)
- Artist(s): Graham Ingels; George Evans; Joe Orlando; Reed Crandall
- Colorist: Marie Severin

M.D. is a short lived comic book published by EC Comics in 1955, the sixth title in its New Direction line. The bi-monthly comic was published by Bill Gaines and edited by Al Feldstein. It lasted a total of five issues before being cancelled along with EC's other New Direction comics.

== Content ==
M.D. focused on medical stories, surgical practices and the day-to-day work of doctors. Each issue featured four stories, plus at least one text piece about a real-life major medical figure.

The frontispiece to the first issue set out its role:

This magazine, M.D., is the sixth of E.C.'s "New Direction" publications. It is dedicated to Mankind's tireless and unceasing battle against disease and to the man who fights that never-ending battle day after day after day... your Family Doctor... your M.D.

But although the M.D. is the protagonist in this magazine, he is not necessarily the hero! The real hero is the man, woman, or child who enters into the M.D.'s stirring and grim world of real medicine to seek out the help and relief his wisdom and experience can give.

This, then, is the theme of M.D. It will contain stories of people... people who are helped by their Family Doctor and his associates in the Medical Profession. It will deal frankly and honestly with the diseases and misfortunes that beset people. It will deal graphically and candidly with the treatment they receive. At times, its stories will be poignant... at time they will be sad... at times they will be grim. But at all times, they will be true to life!

And now, because we feel it best epitomizes the ideals of the Medical Profession, we, the editors of M.D. offer the view taken by all M.D.'s... "The Hippocratic Oath":

...the Hippocratic Oath was then reprinted in full.

The letters page (upon the first of which the above text appeared in lieu of early letters) was titled "The Needles", and contributors to M.D. include Graham Ingels, Marie Severin, George Evans, Joe Orlando, Reed Crandall and Carl Wessler.

== Reprints ==
M.D. was reprinted as part of publisher Russ Cochran's Complete EC Library collection, alongside Valor and Impact as Volume 2 of the "New Direction Part 2" slipcased set (1985). Between September 1999 and January 2000, Cochran and Gemstone Publishing reprinted the five individual issues. This complete run was later rebound, with covers included, in a single softcover EC Annual. Dark Horse reprinted M.D. as part of the EC Archives series in 2021. A new collection was published in 2026 by Fantagraphics titled Shock Treatment that combined M.D. and the companion series Psychoanalysis.

== Issue guide ==
#	Date	Story	Story Artist	Story Writer
1	April/May 1955	The Fight For Life	Graham Ingels	?
1	April/May 1955	Janie Some Day	George Evans	?
1	April/May 1955	The Pain Killer (text piece on William Thomas Green Morton)		
1	April/May 1955	To Fill The Bill	Joe Orlando	?
1	April/May 1955	The Antidote	Reed Crandall	?
2	June/July 1955	The Balance	Reed Crandall	?
2	June/July 1955	Fever Fighter (text piece on William Gorgas)		
2	June/July 1955	Different	Joe Orlando	?
2	June/July 1955	A Case For The Books	Graham Ingels	?
2	June/July 1955	The Trailblazer (text piece on Edward Jenner)		
2	June/July 1955	Even For a While	George Evans	?
3	August/September 1955	When You Know How	Joe Orlando	?
3	August/September 1955	The Right Cure	Graham Ingels	?
3	August/September 1955	Advert for other "New Direction" titles	Jack Davis	?
3	August/September 1955	Shock Treatment	George Evans	?
3	August/September 1955	The Pioneer (text piece on Ignaz Philipp Semmelweiss)		
3	August/September 1955	The Lesson	Reed Crandall	Carl Wessler
4	October/November 1955	So That Others May Walk	Reed Crandall	Carl Wessler
4	October/November 1955	Advert for other "New Direction" titles	Jack Davis	?
4	October/November 1955	Doctor Wizard (text piece on William Harvey)		
4	October/November 1955	New Outlook	Joe Orlando	?
4	October/November 1955	Point of View	Graham Ingels	?
4	October/November 1955	Worried Sick	George Evans	Carl Wessler
5	(December 1955/January 1956)	Complete Cure	Reed Crandall	?
5	(December 1955/January 1956)	Advert for other "New Direction" titles	Jack Davis	?
5	(December 1955/January 1956)	"Army Doc" (text piece on Major-General Leonard Wood)		
5	(December 1955/January 1956)	Child's Play	Joe Orlando	?
5	(December 1955/January 1956)	Emergency	Graham Ingels	?
5	(December 1955/January 1956)	The Right Diagnosis	George Evans	?
