= Confessions Illustrated =

1950s illustrated fiction magazine

- Bud Parke cover, issue #1

Publication information
- Publisher: EC Comics
- Schedule: Quarterly
- Format: Anthology
- Publication date: January/February 1956 - May 1956
- No. of issues: 3

Creative team
- Created by: William Gaines; Al Feldstein

Confessions Illustrated is a black-and-white magazine published by EC Comics in early 1956. Part of EC's Picto-Fiction line, each magazine featured three to five stories. The format alternated blocks of text with several illustrations per page.

The first issue had a cover date of January–February 1956, but the second issue was the last. A third issue existed but was not printed by EC. The Picto-Fiction magazines lost money from the start, and the line was canceled when EC's distributor went bankrupt.

Confessions Illustrated was edited by Al Feldstein. The stories were written by Daniel Keyes. Artists featured include Bud Parke, Jack Kamen, Joe Orlando, Wally Wood, Johnny Craig, Rudy Nappi and Reed Crandall.

In 2006 Confessions Illustrated was reprinted along with the other Picto-Fiction magazines by publisher Russ Cochran (and Gemstone Publishing) in hardbound volumes as the final part of his Complete EC Library. The reprint volume included the previously unpublished third issue of Confessions Illustrated. Dark Horse reprinted Confessions Illustrated as part of the EC Archives series in 2022.

== Issue guide ==
| # | Date | Cover Artist | Story | Story Artist | Story Writer |
|---|---|---|---|---|---|
| 1 | Feb 1956 | Bud Parke | I Joined A Teen-Age Gang | Jack Kamen | Daniel Keyes |
| 1 | Feb 1956 | Bud Parke | I Can Never Marry | Joe Orlando | Daniel Keyes |
| 1 | Feb 1956 | Bud Parke | My Tragic Affair | Wally Wood | Daniel Keyes |
| 1 | Feb 1956 | Bud Parke | I Took My Sister's Husband | Jack Kamen | Daniel Keyes |
| 1 | Feb 1956 | Bud Parke | Passion Made Me A Thief | Johnny Craig | Daniel Keyes |
| 2 | May 1956 | Rudy Nappi | I Sold My Baby | Jack Kamen | Daniel Keyes |
| 2 | May 1956 | Rudy Nappi | Unfaithful Wife | Reed Crandall | Daniel Keyes |
| 2 | May 1956 | Rudy Nappi | They Ran Me Out of Town | Jack Kamen | Daniel Keyes |
| 2 | May 1956 | Rudy Nappi | I Destroyed My Marriage | Joe Orlando | Daniel Keyes |
| 2 | May 1956 | Rudy Nappi | Man-Crazy | Johnny Craig | Daniel Keyes |
| 3 | July 1956 | Rudy Nappi | High School Bride | Jack Kamen | |
| 3 | July 1956 | Rudy Nappi | Teen-Age Temptress | Jack Kamen | |
| 3 | July 1956 | Rudy Nappi | Love Cheat | Johnny Craig | |
| 3 | July 1956 | Rudy Nappi | The Alcoholic | Jack Kamen | |
| 3 | July 1956 | Rudy Nappi | My Two Husbands | Joe Orlando | |
