= SuspenStories =

SuspenStories can refer to either of two comic book titles published by EC Comics in the 1950s:

- Crime SuspenStories
- Shock SuspenStories
