= Weird Science (comics) =

Science fiction comic magazine (1950–1953)

- Al Feldstein cover, issue #13 (1950)

Publication information
- Publisher: EC Comics
- Schedule: Bimonthly
- Format: Anthology
- Publication date: May/June 1950 – November/December 1953
- No. of issues: 22

Creative team
- Created by: William Gaines; Al Feldstein

Weird Science is an American science fiction comic book magazine that was part of the EC Comics line in the early 1950s. Over a four-year span, the comic ran for 22 issues, ending with the November–December, 1953 issue. Weird Fantasy was a sister title published during the same time frame.

== Publication history ==
Published by Bill Gaines and edited by Al Feldstein, the bi-monthly Weird Science replaced Saddle Romances with the May/June 1950 issue. Although the title and format change took effect with issue 12, Gaines and Feldstein decided not to restart the numbering in order to save money on second class postage. The United States Post Office took note and, starting with issue #5, all the issues were numbered correctly. Because of this, Weird Science #12 could refer to either the May/June 1950 issue, or the actual 12th issue published in 1952. The same confusion exists for issues #13-15, #15 being the last issue published before EC reset the numbering.

Artist/Writer Harry Harrison claims credit for originally giving Gaines the notion of publishing science fiction. Harrison has stated that he and artist Wally Wood were interested in science fiction and gave Gaines science fiction stories to read. Harrison, however, had no editorial control over the contents of the comic aside from his own stories and left EC by the end of 1950.

== Artists and writers ==
Early cover illustrations were by Feldstein. Wood, the title's leading artist, took over as the regular cover illustrator in 1952. For a period of time in 1952, Wood drew two stories per issue. The other Weird Science interior artists were Feldstein, Frank Frazetta, Al Williamson, Joe Orlando, George Evans, Harvey Kurtzman, George Roussos, Harrison, Will Elder, Jack Kamen, Sid Check and Jack Olesen. Writers in the early issues included Feldstein, Gaines, Kurtzman, Harrison and Gardner Fox. Gaines and Feldstein wrote nearly all stories from 1951 to 1953.

== Stories and themes ==
As with other EC Comics, Gaines and Feldstein used some Weird Science stories to teach moral lessons. "The Probers" (#8) features a space shuttle doctor who pays no mind to dissecting various animals, only to end up on an alien planet where aliens plan to dissect him. In "The Worm Turns" (#11) astronauts have fun with Mexican jumping beans but face a similar situation when they hide in a piece of fruit on an alien world and are found by a giant alien. "He Walked Among Us" (#13) was a take on organized religion in which a Jesus-like astronaut helps the impoverished populace of an alien world but is killed by those in power, prompting the birth of a religion.

Gaines and Feldstein made cameo appearances in "Chewed Out" (#12), and other EC staffers were drawn into "EC Confidential" (#21).

== Influences and adaptations ==
As with the other EC comics edited by Feldstein, the stories in this comic were primarily based on Gaines reading a large number of science fiction stories and using them to develop "springboards" from which he and Feldstein could launch new stories. Specific story influences that have been identified include the following:

- "Lost in the Microcosm" (issue 12 [1950]) - Henry Hasse's "He Who Shrank"
- "The Micro Race" (issue 13 [1950]) - Theodore Sturgeon's "Microcosmic God"
- "The Sounds from Another World" (issue 14 [1950]) - Roald Dahl's "The Sound Machine"
- "Machine from Nowhere" (issue 14 [1950]) - Maurice Hugi's "Mechanical Mouse"
- "Divide and Conquer" (issue 6) - Donald Wandrei's "A Scientist Divides"
- "Monster from the Fourth Dimension" (issue 7) - Donald Wandrei's "The Monster from Nowhere"
- "The Martian Monster" (issue 9) - Anthony Boucher's "Mr. Lupescu"
- "Why Papa Left Home" (issue 11) - Charles Harness's "Child by Chronos"
- "Chewed Out!" (issue 12) - Katherine MacLean's "Pictures Don't Lie!"
- "Say Your Prayers" (issue 13) - Anthony Boucher's "Expedition"
- "The Island Monster" (issue 17) - Merian C. Cooper and Ernest B. Schoedsack's King Kong
- "Keyed Up!" (issue 19) - Duncan Munro's "U-Turn"

After their unauthorized adaptation of one of Ray Bradbury's stories in another magazine, Bradbury contacted EC about their plagiarism of his work. They reached an agreement for EC to do authorized versions of Bradbury's short fiction. These official adaptations include:

- "The Long Years" (issue 17)
- "Mars Is Heaven!" (issue 18)
- "The One Who Waits" (issue 19)
- "Surprise Package" (issue 20)
- "Punishment Without Crime" (issue 21)
- "Outcast of the Stars" (issue 22)

== Demise ==
EC's science fiction comics were never able to match the popularity of their horror comics like Tales from the Crypt, but Gaines and Feldstein kept them alive using the profits from their more popular titles. In the EC Library reprints, comics historian Mark Evanier theorizes that the short story format, where no story was longer than eight pages helped contribute to poor sales because the horror comics were much better suited for very short stories with shock endings than the science fiction comics. Evanier also ponders whether the very similar logo style of Weird Science and its companion comic Weird Fantasy as well as similar cover subjects contributed to lower sales due to customers thinking they already owned the issues on sale. Historian Digby Diehl wondered whether having host characters like EC's horror comics would have helped the comics be more commercially successful.

When the poor sales became too much to handle, Weird Science combined with companion comic Weird Fantasy in 1954 to become Weird Science-Fantasy. As discussed in an "In Memoriam" feature in the final issue, it was stated that every issue for the previous year and a half lost money and they had no choice but to combine the two comics into one. Weird Science-Fantasy ran for seven issues before a title change to Incredible Science Fiction for four issues.

== Reprints ==
As with many other EC titles, Weird Science has been reprinted numerous times over the years. Ballantine Books reprinted selected stories in a series of paperback EC anthologies in 1964-66. All 22 issues were published in black and white in four hardbound volumes in 1980 as part of publisher Russ Cochran's The Complete EC Library. This set was published in two versions, the original, with what Cochran later said were his own incomplete and occasionally erroneous analyses, and a revised version containing analysis from outside contributors. In addition, all 22 issues were reprinted in comic form in the mid-1990s by Cochran and Gemstone Publishing. This complete run was later rebound, with covers included, in a series of five softcover EC Annuals. In 2007, Cochran and Gemstone began to publish hardcover, re-colored volumes of Weird Science as part of the EC Archives series. Three volumes (of a projected four) were published before Gemstone's financial troubles left the project in limbo. Dark Horse published the fourth and final volume in 2015.

== Media adaptations ==
HBO's Perversions of Science was a science fiction/horror anthology series with episodes adapted from stories found in Weird Science as well as Weird Fantasy and Incredible Science Fiction. The following Weird Science stories were adapted into episodes:

- "Dream of Doom" (Weird Science #12)
- "Given The Heir" (Weird Science #16)
- "Panic" (Weird Science #15)
- "Snap Ending" (Weird Science #18)
- "The People's Choice" (Weird Science #16)

John Hughes' 1985 film—based on the story "Made of the Future!" (Weird Science #5)—has become the most famous bearer of the Weird Science name. Joel Silver, the producer of the film, had acquired film rights to EC Comics in the early 1980s. However, the film has little in common with the comic book series and the said source story besides sharing the title. A television series aired from 1994 to 1997 following the success of the film.

It has been suggested on The Simpsons season 3 DVD commentary for the episode "Treehouse of Horror II" that the appearance of Kang and Kodos was based on cover art from EC Comics. No specific issue number is mentioned, but it may be a combination of different covers including possibly Weird Science #6 and #16.

== Issue guide ==
#	Date	Cover Artist	Story	Story Artist
12(1)	May/June 1950	Al Feldstein	Lost in the Microcosm	Harvey Kurtzman
12(1)	May/June 1950	Al Feldstein	Dream of Doom	Wally Wood & Harry Harrison
12(1)	May/June 1950	Al Feldstein	Experiment... In Death	Jack Kamen
12(1)	May/June 1950	Al Feldstein	"Things" from Outer Space!	Al Feldstein
13(2)	July/Aug 1950	Al Feldstein	The Flying Saucer Invasion	Al Feldstein
13(2)	July/Aug 1950	Al Feldstein	The Meteor Monster	Wally Wood & Harry Harrison
13(2)	July/Aug 1950	Al Feldstein	The Micro-Race!	Jack Kamen
13(2)	July/Aug 1950	Al Feldstein	...The Man Who Raced Time	Harvey Kurtzman
14(3)	Sept/Oct 1950	Al Feldstein	Destruction of the Earth!	Al Feldstein
14(3)	Sept/Oct 1950	Al Feldstein	The Sounds from Another World!	Harvey Kurtzman
14(3)	Sept/Oct 1950	Al Feldstein	Machine from Nowhere	Harry Harrison
14(3)	Sept/Oct 1950	Al Feldstein	The Eternal Man	Jack Kamen
15(4)	Nov/Dec 1950	Al Feldstein	Panic!	Al Feldstein
15(4)	Nov/Dec 1950	Al Feldstein	The Radioactive Child!	Harvey Kurtzman
15(4)	Nov/Dec 1950	Al Feldstein	House, in Time!	Graham Ingels
15(4)	Nov/Dec 1950	Al Feldstein	Gargantua!	Jack Kamen
5	Jan/Feb 1951	Al Feldstein	Made of the Future!	Al Feldstein
5	Jan/Feb 1951	Al Feldstein	Return	Wally Wood
5	Jan/Feb 1951	Al Feldstein	The Last War on Earth	Harvey Kurtzman
5	Jan/Feb 1951	Al Feldstein	Killed in Time!	Jack Kamen
6	March/April 1951	Al Feldstein	Spawn of Venus	Al Feldstein
6	March/April 1951	Al Feldstein	Man and Superman!	Harvey Kurtzman
6	March/April 1951	Al Feldstein	Sinking of the Titanic!	Wally Wood
6	March/April 1951	Al Feldstein	Divide and Conquer	Jack Kamen
7	May/June 1951	Al Feldstein	Monster from the Fourth Dimension	Al Feldstein
7	May/June 1951	Al Feldstein	Something Missing!	Jack Kamen
7	May/June 1951	Al Feldstein	...Gregory Had a Model-T!	Harvey Kurtzman
7	May/June 1951	Al Feldstein	The Aliens!	Wally Wood
8	July/Aug 1951	Al Feldstein	Seeds of Jupiter!	Al Feldstein
8	July/Aug 1951	Al Feldstein	The Escape	George Roussos
8	July/Aug 1951	Al Feldstein	Beyond Repair	Jack Kamen
8	July/Aug 1951	Al Feldstein	The Probers	Wally Wood
9	Sept/Oct 1951	Wally Wood	The Gray Cloud of Death!	Wally Wood
9	Sept/Oct 1951	Wally Wood	The Martian Monster	Jack Kamen
9	Sept/Oct 1951	Wally Wood	The Invaders	Wally Wood
9	Sept/Oct 1951	Wally Wood	The Slave of Evil!	Jack Oleson
10	Nov/Dec 1951	Wally Wood	The Maidens Cried	Wally Wood
10	Nov/Dec 1951	Wally Wood	Reducing... Costs	Jack Kamen
10	Nov/Dec 1951	Wally Wood	Transformation Completed	Wally Wood
10	Nov/Dec 1951	Wally Wood	The Planetoid!	Joe Orlando
11	Jan/Feb 1952	Al Feldstein	The Conquerors of the Moon!	Wally Wood
11	Jan/Feb 1952	Al Feldstein	Only Human!	Jack Kamen
11	Jan/Feb 1952	Al Feldstein	Why Papa Left Home	Joe Orlando
11	Jan/Feb 1952	Al Feldstein	The Worm Turns	Joe Orlando
12	March/April 1952	Wally Wood	A Gobl is a Knog's Best Friend	Wally Wood
12	March/April 1952	Wally Wood	The Last Man!	Jack Kamen
12	March/April 1952	Wally Wood	The Android!	Wally Wood
12	March/April 1952	Wally Wood	Chewed Out!	Joe Orlando
13	May/June 1952	Wally Wood	A Weighty Decision	Wally Wood
13	May/June 1952	Wally Wood	Saving for the Future	Jack Kamen
13	May/June 1952	Wally Wood	He Walked Among Us	Wally Wood
13	May/June 1952	Wally Wood	Say Your Prayers	Joe Orlando
14	July/Aug 1952	Wally Wood	There'll Be Some Changes Made!	Wally Wood
14	July/Aug 1952	Wally Wood	Inside Story!	Bill Elder
14	July/Aug 1952	Wally Wood	Strategy!	Sid Check
14	July/Aug 1952	Wally Wood	They Shall Inherit	Joe Orlando
15	Sept/Oct 1952	Wally Wood	The Martians!	Wally Wood
15	Sept/Oct 1952	Wally Wood	Captivity	Al Williamson
15	Sept/Oct 1952	Wally Wood	Miscalculation	Jack Kamen
15	Sept/Oct 1952	Wally Wood	Bum Steer!	Joe Orlando
16	Nov/Dec 1952	Wally Wood	Down to Earth	Wally Wood
16	Nov/Dec 1952	Wally Wood	Space-Borne!	Al Williamson
16	Nov/Dec 1952	Wally Wood	Given the Heir!	Jack Kamen
16	Nov/Dec 1952	Wally Wood	The People's Choice!	Joe Orlando
17	Jan/Feb 1953	Wally Wood	Plucked!	Wally Wood
17	Jan/Feb 1953	Wally Wood	The Island Monster	Al Williamson
17	Jan/Feb 1953	Wally Wood	Off Day!	Jack Kamen
17	Jan/Feb 1953	Wally Wood	The Long Years!	Joe Orlando
18	March/April 1953	Wally Wood	Mars Is Heaven!	Wally Wood
18	March/April 1953	Wally Wood	Snap Ending!	Al Williamson
18	March/April 1953	Wally Wood	The Parallel!	Jack Kamen
18	March/April 1953	Wally Wood	Disassembled!	Joe Orlando
19	May/June 1953	Wally Wood	The Precious Years	Wally Wood
19	May/June 1953	Wally Wood	The One Who Waits	Al Williamson
19	May/June 1953	Wally Wood	Right on the Button!	Bill Elder
19	May/June 1953	Wally Wood	Keyed Up!	Joe Orlando
20	July/Aug 1953	Wally Wood	The Loathsome!	Wally Wood
20	July/Aug 1953	Wally Wood	Surprise Package	Jack Kamen
20	July/Aug 1953	Wally Wood	The Reformers	Joe Orlando
20	July/Aug 1953	Wally Wood	50 Girls 50	Al Williamson
21	Sept/Oct 1953	Wally Wood	EC Confidential!	Wally Wood
21	Sept/Oct 1953	Wally Wood	Punishment Without Crime	Jack Kamen
21	Sept/Oct 1953	Wally Wood	Two's Company...	Al Williamson & Frank Frazetta
21	Sept/Oct 1953	Wally Wood	The Ugly One	Joe Orlando
22	Nov/Dec 1953	Wally Wood	A New Beginning	Al Williamson
22	Nov/Dec 1953	Wally Wood	The Headhunters	George Evans
22	Nov/Dec 1953	Wally Wood	My World	Wally Wood
22	Nov/Dec 1953	Wally Wood	Outcast of the Stars	Joe Orlando
