= Colin Dawkins =

American writer (1922–1986)

Colin Dawkins wrote "Stampede!", illustrated by John Severin, for Two-Fisted Tales #38 (1954).

Colin Campbell Dawkins (September 8, 1922 – November 27, 1986) was an American writer for advertising and comic books, notably for EC Comics. He was a vice-president of the J. Walter Thompson ad agency.

== Biography ==
Born on an Indian reservation near Tulsa, Oklahoma, Dawkins grew up in New York City, where he studied art with plans to become a portrait painter. He met John Severin when both attended the High School of Music & Art and their close friendship continued throughout their lives. In 1943, he worked with WABC radio's wartime all-night record operation. Joining the Air Corps that year, he graduated from private to corporal while working in public relations and on corps newspapers. Returning to New York after the end of World War II, he began his 34-year career at J. Walter Thompson Company as a mailroom messenger, advancing to market research clerk and copywriter. From 1949 to 1951, he worked in JWT's office in London, where he married Patricia Horan, an American who worked in the art department of the London office. After a period in Montreal, he rejoined the New York office, where he became the Vice President in 1965. In 1972, he was Creative Director in JWT's Paris office.

He retired from JWT in 1981 and died in Pennsylvania in 1986.

== Comic books ==
John Severin and Dawkins collaborated on the "American Eagle" stories for Prize Comics Western. In 1954, they were the uncredited co-editors of Two-Fisted Tales #36-39. Dawkins provided the writing for the majority of the title's 1954-55 stories. For Two-Fisted Tales, Severin and Dawkins created the action-adventure character Ruby Ed Coffey, as Severin recalled:

Those were written completely by Dawkins. Those were characters he dreamed up. I did the designing and that was all I had to do with this. He did the writing, everything on that. I loved them. I like what I did. I drew them, and I love them. He was a good writer. Too bad he was in advertising... I related his stories to the stories I had read, the real Doc Savage in the pulps, not the stuff they have in the comics. Colin had talked to me long before we had ever thought about getting together and doing this sort of thing. Ruby Ed, and he’d have a worldwide network of people that he could work with, and so on and so forth. It sounded good to me. It sounded like my old Doc Savage stuff. I liked that... I’ll tell you one thing though, one of those characters was based on Ham—Doc Savage had that lawyer... And the other guy was based on Captain Easy.

Dawkins also contributed to 1981-82 issues of Warren Publishing's The Rook.

== Books ==
In 1978, Dawkins began writing a history of advertising with the emphasis on J. Walter Thompson. Although the completed work, Ain't It Hell on a Windy Day (1981), was never published, the manuscript is located in the JWT files.
