= Psychoanalysis (comics) =

1955 American series by EC Comics

- Cover illustration by Jack Kamen

Publication information
- Publisher: EC Comics
- Schedule: Bi-monthly
- Genre: Psychological-thriller
- Publication date: March – September 1955
- No. of issues: four

Creative team
- Written by: Robert Bernstein (Al Feldstein?)
- Artist: Jack Kamen
- Colorist: Marie Severin

Psychoanalysis is a comic book published by EC Comics in 1955, the fifth title in the company's New Direction line. The bi-monthly comic was published by William Gaines and edited by Al Feldstein. Psychoanalysis was approved by the Comics Code Authority, but newsstands were reluctant to display it. It lasted a total of four issues before being canceled along with EC's other New Direction comics.

== Characters and stories ==
Psychoanalysis was unlike practically any other comic published, focusing on psychoanalysis and the day-to-day work of therapists. The comic featured three patients, Freddy Carter, Ellen Lyman and Mark Stone, who were undergoing psychoanalysis. The analyst was the central character. He was never named, simply listed as The Psychiatrist. Ellen Lyman did not appear in the fourth and final issue, having been cured in the third issue.

== Reprints ==
Between October 1999 and January 2000, publisher Russ Cochran (in association with Gemstone Publishing) reprinted the four individual issues of the book. This complete run was later rebound, with covers included, in a single softcover EC Annual. Dark Horse reprinted Psychoanalysis as part of the EC Archives series in 2020.

== Adaptations ==
The pages were reformatted as a daily comic strip, samples for possible syndication, but it was never picked up by a syndicate.

At the invitation of Steve Allen, Psychoanalysis was adapted into two dramatic episodes which were telecast as part of the NBC Tonight show. One script was by Feldstein, and the other was by Howard Rodman.
