= Russ Cochran (publisher) =

American comics publisher (1937–2020)

- Born: July 3, 1937
- Died: February 23, 2020
- Occupation(s): Publisher; Comic book publisher Collector

Russ Cochran (/ˈkɒkrən/ KOK-rən; July 3, 1937 – February 23, 2020) was a publisher of EC Comics reprints, Disney comics, and books on Hopalong Cassidy, Chet Atkins, Les Paul, and vacuum tubes. He was a publisher for over 30 years, after quitting his job as a physics professor.

His EC Comics reprints included the black-and-white The Complete EC Library, the four-color EC Annuals, and the full-color hardcover EC Archives.

In 1982, he was awarded an Inkpot Award.

Cochran was associated with Another Rainbow Publishing, Gladstone Publishing, and Gemstone Publishing.

== EC Comics reprints ==
Cochran's reprints (which have been released through a number of publishers, including Cochran himself) were compiled primarily from copies of the original artwork pages (complemented when necessary by scans of the original printed comics), which were owned by EC Publisher William Gaines. Cochran befriended Gaines and also handled the resale of the original artwork to collectors via mail-auction catalogs during the late 1970s and throughout the 1980s.

=== EC Portfolios ===
The EC Portfolios consisted of a half dozen oversized issues between 1971 and 1977, published by Russ Cochran.

=== The Complete EC Library ===
From 1978 to 1996, this project reprinted almost every EC comic in 66 hardbound volumes contained in 17 slipcases. Unlike the original comics, these were done in black and white, except for Mad, which had both a black-and-white edition and a color edition. The complete issue was reprinted, including house ads, letters pages, text stories, and editorial content. Covers for each issue were printed in full color on glossy paper. These volumes included annotations and commentary by various comics historians, including John Benson, Max Allan Collins, Martin Jukovsky, Bill Mason, Bill Spicer and Bhob Stewart.

The Complete EC Library eventually reprinted every New Trend comic, except for the 12 redrawn stories, often by different artists than originally drew the first versions, done for the three Three Dimensional E.C. Classics issues; the third was never published but 2D b&w versions of those last four redrawn stories did finally see print in the late '60s – early '70s in the fanzines Witzend #6 and Squa Tront #s 4 and 5 – up to 2012 that set of fanzines was the only way to acquire any of the works done for this unpublished issue. Fantagraphics' 2013 EC Library tome 50 Girls 50 and Other Stories Illustrated by Al WIlliamson contains his version of "The Planetoid" story intended for that third issue. The other story reduxs have only been printed in 3-D No. 1 (Three Dimensional EC Classics) and 3-D No. 2 (Three Dimensional Tales From The Crypt Of Terror), both published in 1954 . Later volumes of The Complete EC Library also published all the New Direction comics and Picto-Fiction magazines, and many of the Pre-Trend comics.

Volumes in The Complete EC Library did not include EAN/UPC or ISBN information.

Pre-Trend:

- War Against Crime (No. 1-11)/Crime Patrol (No. 7-16) (4 volumes, 1993)
- Modern Love (No. 1-8)/A Moon, A Girl... Romance (No. 9-12)/Saddle Romances (No. 9-11) (2 volumes, 1995)
- Saddle Justice (No. 3-8)/Gunfighter (No. 5-14) (3 volumes, 1996)

New Trend:

- The Complete Weird Science (No. 1-22) (4 volumes, 1978)
- The Complete Tales from the Crypt (No. 17-46) (5 volumes, 1979)
- The Complete Two-Fisted Tales (No. 18-41) (4 volumes, 1980)
- The Complete Weird Fantasy (No. 1-22) (4 volumes, 1980)
- The Complete Shock SuspenStories (No. 1-18) (3 volumes, 1981)
- The Complete Frontline Combat (No. 1-15) (3 volumes, 1982)
- The Complete The Vault of Horror (No. 12-40) (5 volumes, 1982)
- The Complete Weird Science-Fantasy (No. 23-29)/Incredible Science Fiction (No. 30-33) (2 volumes, 1982)
- The Complete Crime SuspenStories (No. 1-27) (5 volumes, 1983)
- The Complete Panic (No. 1-12) (2 volumes, 1984)
- The Complete The Haunt of Fear (No. 1-28) (5 volumes, 1985)
- The Complete MAD (No. 1-23) (4 volumes, 1986)
- The Complete MAD in Color (No. 1-23) (4 volumes, 1986)

New Direction:

- Piracy (No. 1-7)/Aces High (No. 1-5)/Psychoanalysis (No. 1-4)/Extra! (No. 1-5) (4 volumes, 1988)
- Valor (No. 1-5)/M.D. (No. 1-5)/Impact (No. 1-5) (3 volumes, 1988)

In 2006, Cochran/Gemstone supplemented the 1980-90s The Complete EC Library with a nineteenth slipcase box (counting both versions of the Mad box) of 4 volumes, The Complete Picto-Fiction collection, comprising all the issues of the post-'New Direction' titles, including material prepared for never-published issues: Confessions Illustrated, Crime Illustrated, Shock Illustrated and Terror Illustrated, including "18 previously unseen stories, never published before".

=== EC Classics ===
This group of magazine-sized reprints from Cochran appeared between 1985 and 1989. The first six issues featured various stories for each specific comic. Starting with issue 7, each reprint featured two specific issues. A total of 12 issues were released. These comics have no text at the top of the cover aside from the title, and have a cover price of $4.95 within a white circle at the upper right of the cover.

=== Gladstone Publishing EC reprints ===
From 1990–1991, Cochran worked with Gladstone Publishing to reprint issues from seven different titles in a total of eighteen 64-page issues. Each 64-page issue reprinted a single issue of two different titles, with the one of those titles being shown on the cover.

Thus, the following were published:

- Six issues of Tales from the Crypt, paired with Crime SuspenStories (July 1990 – May 1991)
- Six issues of The Vault of Horror, paired with The Haunt of Fear in #1–4 and Weird Fantasy in #5–6 (August 1990 – June 1991)
- Four issues of Weird Science, paired with Weird Fantasy in #1–3 and containing Weird Fantasy and Weird Science-Fantasy (not Weird Science) in #4 (September 1990 – March 1991)
- Two issues of The Haunt of Fear, paired with Weird Science-Fantasy (May/July 1991)

The covers have text such as "Double-Sized" or "Giant Horror" at the top, above the comic title, and a stylized triangular "G" logo at the upper right side, where a second EC logo appears on the other '90s reprints. Because of the mixing of titles, the Gladstone Reprints are not recommended for those trying to collect every issue from one "New Trend" line.

=== RCP Reprints (Russ Cochran) ===
The RCP Reprints appeared from 1991–1992 and also reprinted various issues from the horror, sci-fi and crime comics, containing two original issues per reprint. In many cases, these issues were from different "New Trend" lines and thus the RCP Reprints are not recommended for those trying to collect every issue from one "New Trend" line. Distinguishing marks are the text "64 pages of vintage EC horror" at the top of the cover, and a cover price of $2.00 under the EC logo. There is also a series with vertical text "An Extra Large Comic" at the left side of the cover, and a $3.95 cover price.

Starting in 1992, the comics were reprinted in original chronological order in a 32-page form. Shortly thereafter the publisher changed to Gemstone (see next section) and this line eventually reprinted every New Trend and New Direction comic except for Mad, and 'Pre-Trend' titles Crime Patrol (which became The Crypt of Terror and then Tales from the Crypt), and War Against Crime (which became The Vault of Horror) as well.

=== Gemstone Publishing EC reprints ===
Cochran and the EC reprints moved to Gemstone Publishing, which naturally reprinted the Gladstone-printed issues as part of their EC reprints. From 1992, Gemstone also republished New Trend and New Direction titles in single issues for the first time ever. In association with Gemstone, Cochran has published the EC Annuals and EC Archives described below. The Gemstone reprints have a cover price of $1.50 under the EC logo at the right side, and text such as "First Fearsome Issue" or "First SuspensFul Issue" at the top above the comic title.

Gemstone reprints:

- Crime SuspenStories, Shock SuspenStories, Two-Fisted Tales, Weird Fantasy and Weird Science-Fantasy (1992)
- Incredible Science Fiction (1994)
- Frontline Combat (1995)
- Panic (1997)
- Piracy and Valor (1998)
- Aces High, Impact, M.D. and Psychoanalysis (1999)
- Crime Patrol and Extra! in 2000.

=== EC Annuals ===
The Cochran/Gemstone EC Annuals are sixty-three omnibuses of the RCP/Gemstone EC reprints (see above), usually with four to five, occasionally three or six, issues, complete with individual covers, bound in each Annual with a new cover wrap around the whole. Titles in the series were Tales from the Crypt, The Vault of Horror, The Haunt of Fear, Shock SuspenStories, Crime SuspenStories, Crime Patrol, War Against Crime, Weird Science, Weird Fantasy, Weird Science-Fantasy, Two-Fisted Tales, Frontline Combat, Panic, Piracy, Impact, Valor, Aces High, Extra!, Psychoanalysis and MD.

=== EC Archives ===
The Cochran/Gemstone 2006 project EC Archives is a series of full-color hardcover books, each containing six issues of the comic. The series continues under the Dark Horse imprint since 2013.

=== The Sunday Funnies ===
In 2011, Cochran launched a new monthly publication, The Sunday Funnies, reprinting vintage Sunday comic strips in a 22"x16", full-color newspaper-insert-style format.

=== Death ===
Russ Cochran died on February 23, 2020, at the age of 82. No cause of death was made public by the family.

== See also ==
- Another Rainbow Publishing
- Gladstone Publishing
- Gemstone Publishing
- EC Archives
- EC Comics
- List of Entertaining Comics publications
- Nostalgia Press
