= Valor (EC Comics) =

EC Comics title

- Al Williamson cover, issue #2

Publication information
- Publisher: EC Comics
- Schedule: Bimonthly
- Format: Anthology
- Publication date: March/April 1955 - November/December 1955
- No. of issues: Five

Creative team
- Created by: William Gaines; Al Feldstein

Valor is a comic book published by EC Comics in 1955 as a title in its New Direction line. The bi-monthly comic was published by Bill Gaines and edited by Al Feldstein. It lasted a total of five issues before being cancelled, along with EC's other New Direction comics.

Valor was dedicated to tales of action and adventure in various period settings, including Ancient Egypt, the Roman Empire, the Middle Ages, the Crusades, the French Revolution, and the Napoleonic era. It was similar in vein to the historical stories that previously appeared in EC's Two-Fisted Tales and Frontline Combat from 1950 through 1954.

Artists included Reed Crandall, George Evans, Gardner Fox, Graham Ingels, Bernard Krigstein, Joe Orlando, Angelo Torres, Al Williamson and Wally Wood.

Valor was reprinted as part of publisher Russ Cochran's Complete EC Library in 1988. Between October 1998 and February 1999, Cochran (in association with Gemstone Publishing) reprinted all five individual issues. This complete run was later rebound, with covers included, in a single softcover EC Annual. Dark Horse reprinted Valor as part of the EC Archives series in 2017.

== Issue guide ==
| # | Date | Cover Artist | Story | Story Artist |
|---|---|---|---|---|
| 1 | March/April 1955 | Wally Wood | The Arena | Al Williamson and Angelo Torres |
| 1 | March/April 1955 | Wally Wood | Strategy | Bernard Krigstein |
| 1 | March/April 1955 | Wally Wood | Revolution | Graham Ingels |
| 1 | March/April 1955 | Wally Wood | The Return of King Arthur | Wally Wood |
| 2 | May/June 1955 | Al Williamson | The Champion | Al Williamson |
| 2 | May/June 1955 | Al Williamson | Poetic Justice | Bernard Krigstein |
| 2 | May/June 1955 | Al Williamson | The Colonel's Son | Graham Ingels |
| 2 | May/June 1955 | Al Williamson | The King's Service | Wally Wood |
| 3 | July/Aug 1955 | Joe Orlando | The Cloak of Command | Al Williamson |
| 3 | July/Aug 1955 | Joe Orlando | Gentle As A Whisper | Joe Orlando |
| 3 | July/Aug 1955 | Joe Orlando | The Pyramid | Bernard Krigstein |
| 3 | July/Aug 1955 | Joe Orlando | Debt of Honor | Reed Crandall |
| 4 | Sept/Oct 1955 | Wally Wood | Gratitude | Joe Orlando |
| 4 | Sept/Oct 1955 | Wally Wood | The Know-Nothing | Bernard Krigstein |
| 4 | Sept/Oct 1955 | Wally Wood | The Taste of Freedom | Graham Ingels |
| 4 | Sept/Oct 1955 | Wally Wood | A Knight's Dream | Reed Crandall |
| 5 | Nov/Dec 1955 | Wally Wood | Dangerous Animal | Wally Wood |
| 5 | Nov/Dec 1955 | Wally Wood | Important Man | Graham Ingels |
| 5 | Nov/Dec 1955 | Wally Wood | Treasure from Xanadu | Bernard Krigstein |
| 5 | Nov/Dec 1955 | Wally Wood | Day of Reckoning | Al Williamson and George Evans |
