= Panic (comics) =

Humor comic published by EC

- Panic issue #8 (April-May 1955)
- Categories: Satire, humor
- Frequency: Bimonthly
- First issue: February/March 1954, February 1954; 72 years ago
- Final issue: October/November October 1955; 70 years ago
- Company: EC Comics
- Country: United States
- Language: English

Panic is a bi-monthly humor comic that was published by Bill Gaines' EC Comics line during the mid-1950s as a companion to Harvey Kurtzman's Mad, which was being heavily imitated by other comic publishers.

Panic was edited by Al Feldstein (who became the editor of Mad a few years later). Beginning with its first issue (February–March 1954), Panic had a 12-issue run over two years. Feldstein was the primary cover artist, with stories illustrated by Jack Davis, Will Elder, Jack Kamen, Joe Orlando, Basil Wolverton and Wally Wood. Some story ideas were by Nick Meglin, later the co-editor of Mad. Scripts were by Feldstein, Elder and Jack Mendelsohn, later a co-screenwriter of Yellow Submarine (1968) and an Emmy-nominated TV comedy writer.

EC dubbed Panic the "only authorized imitation" of Mad, but Mad's creator didn't enjoy the joke. Almost thirty years later, Harvey Kurtzman told an interviewer, "Panic was another sore point. Gaines, by some convoluted reasoning, decided to double the profit of Mad by doing a Feldstein version of Mad and he just plundered all of my techniques and artists. For this there was a real conflict of interests."

== First issue controversy ==
The publication was immediately controversial, as detailed by Steve Stiles in his article,"It's a Panic!":

What Panic also earned was a storm of indignation that burst over Gaines' head with the very first issue, and all over the holiday of "Peace on Earth, Good Will Towards Men". It's strange that Gaines didn't see it coming, but some people got very annoyed with a satire of "The Night Before Christmas". To put it mildly.

Gaines later recalled, "The trouble we had on the Santa Claus story was Bill Elder. He had put a sign on the sleigh of Santa Claus, 'Just Divorced'. Now how do a bunch of iconoclastic, atheist bastards like us know that Santa Claus is a saint and that he can't be divorced and that this is going to offend Boston?" This didn't stop Gaines from later dressing in a Santa suit and posing for a Mad subscription offer as a benevolent gift giver (because the subscription rate was only a few cents cheaper than buying the issues at cover price).

As a result of the parody, Panic was ultimately banned from sale in the state of Massachusetts. Gaines puckishly responded by issuing a press release announcing that as a "retaliatory measure," EC was pulling all copies of its Picture Stories from the Bible comic book out of Massachusetts. It took the newspapers a few days to realize that the discontinued comic hadn't been on sale in Massachusetts, or anywhere else, in five years.

More legal hassles came EC's way because of another story from the first issue, a gory parody of Mickey Spillane's Vengeance Is Mine called My Gun is the Jury that ended with one of Spillane's bombshell women revealed as a transvestite. A few days after the Santa controversy in Massachusetts, EC's offices were raided by the New York City police. Gaines' associate Lyle Stuart willingly took responsibility and was arrested; the charge was quickly thrown out of court. In the meantime, abrasive gossip columnist Walter Winchell reported the story without mentioning that Stuart was released without result, and added, "Attention all newsstands! Anyone selling the filth of Lyle Stuart will be subject to the same arrest!" Winchell may have been motivated by "The Secret Life of Walter Winchell", a negative book based on a series of negative magazine articles about him written by Stuart, but his rhetoric cost him $21,500 after Stuart sued for libel. Stuart used the money to start his own publishing house.

== Differing views ==
Mad was quickly and widely imitated, to the point where creator and editor Harvey Kurtzman mocked his competitors' wave of copycat humor comic books in Mad's 17th issue. But he was particularly unhappy with EC's own imitation. "I was pretty bitter about it," Kurtzman said in 1965. "The publisher and I got into a series of ever-increasing arguments going around in ever diminishing circles."

Publisher Gaines rejected Kurtzman's complaint, telling an interviewer decades later:

Sometimes Harvey loses sight of the fact that this was my business, that I was publishing these magazines, that one of my magazines was Mad, that I had a lot of other magazines making more or less profits, some of them none, and what's so immoral about me putting out another magazine imitating my own magazine? You see Harvey could never realize that Mad was mine; he thought it was his. [Laughter.] That was the basic problem. To me Mad was one of the EC Comics. If we put out The Vault of Horror and it's successful, what's wrong with putting out Tales From the Crypt? If we put out Mad and it's successful, what's wrong with putting out — all the time we put out Panic, Harvey felt we were competing with him, and I used to say, "Harvey, we're not competing with you, we're all one company. [Laughter.] The money comes from everywhere and it goes into a pot and from this pot we publish." Why am I competing?

And it was something that Harvey could never understand. He felt it was separate. The fact that 30 to 70 other people were imitating Mad, Martin Goodman had half a dozen, there were 70 titles I understand, my printer once counted them up, because he used to keep a list of all the comics published and he told me there were 70. I think he was wrong, but there were certainly 30, 40, or 50 imitations of Mad. You know, Eek, Ecch, Oook, Turn Blue was Shelly Mayer's, I can't even remember them all, Crazy, Cracked, Nutty, Silly, Woppy, Daffy, we got all these imitations of Mad, that's OK, but if I put out Panic it's immoral [laughter].

== Reprints ==
Panic has been reprinted by publisher Russ Cochran several times. In 1985, it formed part of his Complete EC Library, published (in black and white) as a slipcased hardcover two-volume set. Panic was also reprinted issue-by-issue between March 1997 and December 1999 by Cochran (in association with Gemstone Publishing). This complete run was later rebound, with covers included, in three softcover EC Annuals. Dark Horse Comics subsequently published two hardback volumes of reprints as part of their EC Archives series, with volume 1 (issues 1 to 6) published in 2016 and volume 2 (issues 7 to 12) published in 2017. A paperback edition of the first volume was published in April 2026, with the second to follow in July 2026.

== Issue guide ==
#	Date	Cover Artist	Story	Story Artist
1	February/March 1954	Al Feldstein	My Gun Is the Jury!	Jack Davis
			This Is Your Strife	Joe Orlando
			Little Red Riding Hood	Jack Kamen
			The Night Before Christmas	Bill Elder
2	April/May 1954	Al Feldstein	African Scream!	Wally Wood
			The Lady or the Tiger?	Bill Elder
			Breakfast with the Fershlugginers	Joe Orlando
			Come Back, Little Street Car!	Jack Davis
3	June/July 1954	Al Feldstein	Li'l Melvin	Bill Elder
			The Quite-a-Man!	Wally Wood
			Mother Goon's Nertzery Rhymes	Joe Orlando
			Strike It Richly!	Jack Davis
4	August/September 1954	Basil Wolverton	Smiddy	Bill Elder
			Hindu	Wally Wood
			Just Plain Bull	Joe Orlando
			I Touched a Flying Saucer!	Jack Davis
5	October/November 1954	Al Feldstein	Tick Dracy	Bill Elder
			Panic's Dictionary of Sports	Jack Davis
			Spots Before Your Eyes!	Joe Orlando
			You Too Can Hook a Zillionaire!	Wally Wood
6	December/January 1955		The Phansom	Bill Elder
			Executive Seat	Wally Wood
			Comic Strip Advertising	Joe Orlando
			Popular Mecpanics Magazine	Jack Davis
7	February/March 1955		Mel Padooka	Bill Elder
			You Axed for it!	Jack Davis
			Travel Posters	Joe Orlando
			Them There Those	Wally Wood
8	April/May 1955		Irving Oops	Bill Elder
			Carmen	Joe Orlando
			Panic Peeks into Some Old Under Paints	Jack Davis
			Gone with the Widow	Wally Wood
9	June/July 1955		Rx Migrane M.D.	Bill Elder
			Drive In Movie!	Jack Davis
			Zoo Charade	Joe Orlando
			Bo Bummel, or Much Ado About Clothing	Wally Wood
10	August/September 1955		Captain Izzy and Washt Upps	Bill Elder
			A Star is Corn	Jack Davis
			Punch Lines	Bill Elder
			Foreign Movies	Jack Davis
11	October/November 1955		Mary Worthless!	Bill Elder
			Shaggy Dog Stories!	Jack Davis
			Sunday at the Beach!	Bill Elder
			20,000 Leaks Under the Sea	Wally Wood
12	December/January 1956	Jack Davis	Charlie Chinless	Bill Elder
			House Hunting!	Jack Davis
			The Heartaches of Joliet's Groans!	Bill Elder
			'S a Tragic Air Command	Wally Wood
