= Jerry DeFuccio =

American comic book writer (1925–2001)

Caricature of Jerry DeFuccio by Antonio Prohías. DeFuccio scripted The Owl for a newspaper comic strip.

Jerome DeFuccio (July 3, 1925 – August 10, 2001) was an American comic book writer and editor known primarily for his work at Mad, where he was an associate editor for 25 years. He was also closely involved in many of the Mad paperbacks, editing Clods' Letters to Mad and many other reprints and spin-offs. Some of his contributions to EC Comics appeared under the pseudonym Jerry Dee.

== Early life and education ==
Raised in Jersey City, New Jersey, DeFuccio graduated from St. Peter's Preparatory School, before attending Saint Peter's College (since renamed as Saint Peter's University) and Fordham University.

== Career ==
Guests and visitors to Mad usually wound up chatting in DeFuccio's office. As noted by Mark Evanier:

Anyone who visited the Mad offices during his years there probably met and spent time with Jerry. He was the magazine's historian, researcher and unofficial greeter. He was also a devout student of comic book history who was responsible for unearthing much that is today known about vintage funnybooks. He was very nice to me when I first ventured into the halls of Mad, as he was to just about everyone.

At EC Comics during the early 1950s, DeFuccio was an assistant editor and researcher on Harvey Kurtzman's war comics, Frontline Combat and Two-Fisted Tales, research that on one day involved taking a trip underwater in a submarine. He wrote scripts for EC and also contributed one-page text pieces to several EC titles. For Two-Fisted Tales #33 he wrote "Outpost" (illustrated by John Severin and Will Elder. For Frontline Combat he wrote "War Dance!" and "Belts n' Celts" (both illustrated by Severin) and "Wolf!" (illustrated by Wally Wood). He later wrote scripts for the line of war comics published by DC Comics, including Star Spangled War and Our Fighting Forces.

DeFuccio teamed with artist Mart Bailey to create a superhero newspaper comic strip, "The Owl" (not to be confused with the comic book character The Owl from 1940).

DeFuccio's book introductions include Bud Blake's Tiger (Grosset & Dunlap, 1969). As an expert on comic book history, he contributed to such publications as Squa Tront, Graphic Story Magazine, The Comics Journal, Wonderworld and The Comic Book Price Guide. He also worked briefly for Mad's rival, Cracked, after leaving Mad in 1980.

DeFuccio died of cancer on August 10, 2001.

== Partial bibliography ==
- DC Comics (1970–1972)
  - G.I. Combat #152
  - Our Fighting Forces #124
  - Star Spangled War #162
  - Tomahawk #134
  - Weird War Tales #2

== Sources ==
Comics Interview 120. Jerry DeFuccio interviewed by Bill Kieffer, 1993.
