= Weird Fantasy =

Dark fantasy and science fiction anthology comic

- Al Williamson & Frank Frazetta cover, issue #21

Publication information
- Publisher: EC Comics
- Schedule: Bimonthly
- Format: Ongoing series
- Genre: Science fiction
- Publication date: May/June 1950 – November/December 1953
- No. of issues: 22

Creative team
- Created by: William Gaines; Al Feldstein
- Written by: William Gaines, Al Feldstein, Harvey Kurtzman, Harry Harrison, Wally Wood
- Artist(s): Frank Frazetta, Al Feldstein, Harvey Kurtzman, Wally Wood, Marie Severin, Will Elder, Joe Orlando, Bernie Krigstein, Al Williamson, John Severin

Weird Fantasy is an American science fiction anthology comic that was part of the EC Comics line in the early 1950s. The companion comic for Weird Fantasy was Weird Science. Over a four-year span, Weird Fantasy ran for 22 issues, ending with the November–December 1953 issue. Despite its title, it published works of science fiction.

== Publication history ==
The bi-monthly science-fiction comic, published by Bill Gaines and edited by Al Feldstein, replaced romance comic A Moon, A Girl... Romance with the May/June 1950 issue. Although the title and format change took effect with issue 13, Gaines and Feldstein decided not to restart the numbering in order to save money on second class postage. The Post Office took note, and starting with issue #6, all the issues were numbered correctly. Because of this, "Weird Fantasy #13" could refer to either the May/June 1950 issue or the actual 13th issue of the title, published in 1952. The same confusion exists for issues #14–17, #17 being the last issue published before EC reset the numbering.

Harry Harrison, primarily a writer but also an artist, credited himself for turning Gaines on to the idea of publishing science fiction. Harrison has stated that he and fellow artist Wally Wood were interested in science fiction and supplied Gaines with a lot of science fiction material to read. Harrison had no editorial control over the contents of the comic aside from his own stories, and he left EC by the end of 1950.

== Artists and writers ==
Cover illustrations were by Feldstein with the exception of two by Joe Orlando, one collaboration by Feldstein and Al Williamson, plus another collaboration by Williamson with Frank Frazetta. Artists who drew stories for this EC title were Feldstein, Frazetta, Williamson, Orlando, Wally Wood, Harvey Kurtzman, George Roussos, Harrison, Reed Crandall, Will Elder, Bernard Krigstein, Jack Kamen, John Severin and Mac Elkin. Writers in the early issues included Feldstein, Gaines, Kurtzman, Harrison and Gardner Fox. Gaines and Feldstein wrote nearly all stories from 1951–53.

== Stories and themes ==
Creators Gaines and Feldstein made cameos in the stories "Cosmic Ray Bomb Explosion" (14, July–August 1950), "7 Year Old Genius" (7) and "The Expert" (14) and "The Ad" (14).

Issues 14 and 15 in 1952 ran EC Quickies, a format featuring two similarly themed stories, each three or four pages, in the space usually devoted to a seven or eight-page story.

In Weird Fantasy 17 (1953), Al Williamson illustrated "The Aliens". In the story, aliens head for Earth to prevent a nuclear war, but they arrive too late. Amid the devastation they find a copy of the same issue ofWeird Fantasy in which the story appear. They turn to a page of the story (also entitled "The Aliens" that had predicted their arrival, culminating in an infinite regress.

Arguably the comic's most controversial story was published in issue 18 in 1953. "Judgment Day" featured an astronaut who comes to a planet populated by orange and blue robots who hope to join the Galactic Republic. As he tours the planet, the astronaut, named Tarlton, realizes that blue robots are treated horribly and given fewer rights than the orange robots, despite the fact that they are identical except for the color of their exterior. Tarlton decides that because of this, the planet will not be allowed in the Galactic Republic. In the final panel Tarlton removes his helmet, revealing that he is black. This story was chosen for reprinting approximately three years later in Incredible Science Fiction, which resulted in an argument that caused Gaines to quit comics altogether.

== Influences and adaptations of previous work ==
As with the other EC comics edited by Feldstein, the stories in this comic were primarily based on Gaines reading a large number of science fiction stories and using them to develop "springboards" from which he and Feldstein could launch new stories. Specific story influences that have been identified include the following:

- "Martian Infiltration" (issue 15 [1950]) – Martin Pearson's "The Embassy"
- "The Last City" (issue 16 [1950]) – Arthur L. Zagat's "The Lanson Screen"
- "Deadlock!" (issue 17 [1950]) – Murray Leinster's "First Contact"
- "The Duplicates" (issue 9) – William F. Temple's "4-Sided Triangle"
- "A Timely Shock" (issue 10) – Fritz Leiber's "Nice Girl With Five Husbands"
- "The Thing in the Jar" (issue 11) – Ralph Milne Farley's "Liquid Life"
- "A Lesson in Anatomy" (issue 12) – Ray Bradbury's "The Man Upstairs"
- "The End" (issue 13) – Damon Knight's "Not With A Bang" and Miriam Allen deFord's "The Last Generation"
- "Home to Stay" (issue 13) – Ray Bradbury's "The Rocket Man" and "Kaleidoscope"
- "The Long Trip" (issue 15) – A. E. van Vogt's "Far Centaurus"
- "He Who Waits" (issue 15) – Manly Wade Wellman's "The Kelpie"
- "Mass Meeting" (issue 16) – Malcolm Jameson's "Tricky Tonnage"
- "The Green Thing" (issue 16) – John Campbell's "Who Goes There?"
- "...For Us the Living" (issue 20) – Ward Moore's "Bring the Jubilee"

After their publication of "Home to Stay", Ray Bradbury contacted EC concerning their plagiarism of his work. They reached an agreement for EC to do authorized versions of Bradbury's short fiction. Official adaptations then followed.

- "There Will Come Soft Rains" (issue 17)
- "Zero Hour" (issue 18)
- "King of the Grey Spaces" (issue 19)
- "I, Rocket" (issue 20)
- "The Million Year Picnic" (issue 21)
- "The Silent Towns" (issue 22)

== Demise ==
EC's science fiction comics were never able to match the popularity of their horror comics like Tales from the Crypt, but Gaines and Feldstein kept them alive using the profits from their more popular titles. In the EC Library reprints, comics historian Mark Evanier theorizes that the short story format, where no story was longer than eight pages helped contribute to poor sales because the horror comics were much better suited for very short stories with shock endings than the science fiction comics. Evanier also ponders whether the very similar logo style of Weird Science and its companion comic Weird Fantasy, as well as similar cover subjects contributed to lower sales due to customers thinking they already owned the issues on sale. Historian Digby Diehl wondered whether having host characters like EC's horror comics would have helped the comics be more commercially successful.

When the poor sales became too much to handle, Weird Fantasy combined with companion comic Weird Science in 1954 to become Weird Science-Fantasy. As discussed in an "In Memoriam" feature in the final issue, every issue for the previous year and a half had lost money, and EC had no choice but to combine the two comics into one. Weird Science-Fantasy ran for seven issues before a title change to Incredible Science Fiction for four issues.

== Reprints ==
As with many other EC titles, Weird Fantasy has been reprinted numerous times over the years. Ballantine Books reprinted selected stories in a series of paperback EC anthologies in 1964–66. All 22 issues were published in black and white in four hardbound volumes in 1980 as part of publisher Russ Cochran's The Complete EC Library. In addition, all 22 issues were reprinted in comic form in the mid-1990s by Cochran and Gemstone Publishing. This complete run was later rebound, with covers included, in a series of five softcover EC Annuals. Cochran and Gemstone planned to publish hardcover, re-colored volumes of Weird Fantasy as part of the EC Archives series, but Gemstone's financial troubles left this project in limbo. Dark Horse Comics ultimately published the series, comprising four volumes, from 2014 to 2019.

== Media Adaptations ==
HBO's Perversions of Science was a science fiction/horror anthology series with episodes adapted from stories found in Weird Fantasy as well as Weird Science and Incredible Science Fiction. The following Weird Fantasy stories were adapted into episodes:

- "Anatomy Lesson" (Originally Titled "A Lesson in Anatomy," Weird Fantasy #12)
- "The Exile" (Weird Fantasy #14)
- "Planely Possible" (Weird Fantasy #21)

== Issue guide ==
#	Date	Cover Artist	Story	Story Artist
13(1)	May/June 1950	Al Feldstein	Am I Man or Machine?	Al Feldstein
13(1)	May/June 1950	Al Feldstein	Only Time Will Tell	Wally Wood & Harry Harrison
13(1)	May/June 1950	Al Feldstein	The Men of Tomorrow	Jack Kamen
13(1)	May/June 1950	Al Feldstein	...Trip into the Unknown	Harvey Kurtzman
14(2)	July/Aug 1950	Al Feldstein	Cosmic Ray Bomb Explosion!	Al Feldstein
14(2)	July/Aug 1950	Al Feldstein	The Black Arts	Wally Wood & Harry Harrison
14(2)	July/Aug 1950	Al Feldstein	The Trap of Time!	Jack Kamen
14(2)	July/Aug 1950	Al Feldstein	Atom Bomb Thief!	Harvey Kurtzman
15(3)	Sept/Oct 1950	Al Feldstein	Martian Infiltration	Al Feldstein
15(3)	Sept/Oct 1950	Al Feldstein	Henry and His... Goon Child	Harvey Kurtzman
15(3)	Sept/Oct 1950	Al Feldstein	I Died Tomorrow!	Jack Kamen
15(3)	Sept/Oct 1950	Al Feldstein	Dark Side of the Moon	Wally Wood
16(4)	Nov/Dec 1950	Al Feldstein	The Last City	Al Feldstein
16(4)	Nov/Dec 1950	Al Feldstein	The Mysterious Ray From Another Dimension	Harvey Kurtzman
16(4)	Nov/Dec 1950	Al Feldstein	Second Childhood	Jack Kamen
16(4)	Nov/Dec 1950	Al Feldstein	A Trip to a Star!	Wally Wood
17(5)	Jan/Feb 1951	Al Feldstein	Child of Tomorrow!	Al Feldstein
17(5)	Jan/Feb 1951	Al Feldstein	The Time Machine and the Shmoe!	Harvey Kurtzman
17(5)	Jan/Feb 1951	Al Feldstein	Deadlock!	Wally Wood
17(5)	Jan/Feb 1951	Al Feldstein	Prediction of Disaster!	Jack Kamen
6	March/April 1951	Al Feldstein	Space-Warp!	Al Feldstein
6	March/April 1951	Al Feldstein	The Dimension Translator	Harvey Kurtzman
6	March/April 1951	Al Feldstein	...And Then There Were Two!	Jack Kamen
6	March/April 1951	Al Feldstein	Rescued!	Wally Wood
7	May/June 1951	Al Feldstein	7 Year Old Genius!	Al Feldstein
7	May/June 1951	Al Feldstein	Come Into My Parlor	Jack Kamen
7	May/June 1951	Al Feldstein	Across the Sun!	George Roussos
7	May/June 1951	Al Feldstein	Breakdown!	Wally Wood
8	July/Aug 1951	Al Feldstein	The Origin of the Species!	Al Feldstein
8	July/Aug 1951	Al Feldstein	It Didn't Matter	Jack Kamen
8	July/Aug 1951	Al Feldstein	The Slave Ship	Bernard Krigstein
8	July/Aug 1951	Al Feldstein	The Enemies of the Colony	Wally Wood
9	Sept/Oct 1951	Al Feldstein	Spawn of Mars	Wally Wood
9	Sept/Oct 1951	Al Feldstein	The Duplicates	Jack Kamen
9	Sept/Oct 1951	Al Feldstein	The Connection	Mac Elkin
9	Sept/Oct 1951	Al Feldstein	A Mistake in Multiplication	Joe Orlando
10	Nov/Dec 1951	Al Feldstein	The Secret of Saturn's Ring!	Wally Wood
10	Nov/Dec 1951	Al Feldstein	A Timely Shock!	Jack Kamen
10	Nov/Dec 1951	Al Feldstein	The Mutants!	Wally Wood
10	Nov/Dec 1951	Al Feldstein	Not on the Menu	Joe Orlando
11	Jan/Feb 1952	Al Feldstein	The Two-Century Journey!	Wally Wood
11	Jan/Feb 1952	Al Feldstein	Shrinking From Abuse	Jack Kamen
11	Jan/Feb 1952	Al Feldstein	The 10th At Noon	Wally Wood
11	Jan/Feb 1952	Al Feldstein	The Thing in the Jar	Joe Orlando
12	March/April 1952	Al Feldstein	Project... Survival!	Wally Wood
12	March/April 1952	Al Feldstein	A Lesson in Anatomy!	Jack Kamen
12	March/April 1952	Al Feldstein	The Die is Cast!	Wally Wood
12	March/April 1952	Al Feldstein	A Man's Job!	Joe Orlando
13	May/June 1952	Al Feldstein	The End!	Wally Wood
13	May/June 1952	Al Feldstein	The Trip!	Jack Kamen
13	May/June 1952	Al Feldstein	Home to Stay!	Wally Wood
13	May/June 1952	Al Feldstein	Don't Count Your Chickens...	Joe Orlando
14	July/Aug 1952	Al Feldstein	The Exile!	Wally Wood
14	July/Aug 1952	Al Feldstein	The Expert!	Joe Orlando
14	July/Aug 1952	Al Feldstein	The Ad!	Joe Orlando
14	July/Aug 1952	Al Feldstein	Close Call!	Jack Kamen
14	July/Aug 1952	Al Feldstein	Mad Journey!	Al Williamson
15	Sept/Oct 1952	Al Feldstein	Revulsion!	Joe Orlando
15	Sept/Oct 1952	Al Feldstein	The Quick Trip	Al Williamson
15	Sept/Oct 1952	Al Feldstein	The Long Trip	Al Williamson
15	Sept/Oct 1952	Al Feldstein	He Who Waits!	Jack Kamen
15	Sept/Oct 1952	Al Feldstein	By George!!	Al Williamson
16	Nov/Dec 1952	Al Feldstein	Mass Meeting!	Joe Orlando
16	Nov/Dec 1952	Al Feldstein	Skeleton Key!	Al Williamson
16	Nov/Dec 1952	Al Feldstein	What He Saw!	Jack Kamen
16	Nov/Dec 1952	Al Feldstein	The Green Thing!	Joe Orlando
17	Jan/Feb 1953	Al Feldstein	In the Beginning...	Joe Orlando
17	Jan/Feb 1953	Al Feldstein	Ahead of the Game!	Bill Elder
17	Jan/Feb 1953	Al Feldstein	The Aliens	Al Williamson
17	Jan/Feb 1953	Al Feldstein	There Will Come Soft Rains...	Wally Wood
18	March/April 1953	Al Feldstein & Al Williamson	Counter-Clockwise	Bill Elder & John Severin
18	March/April 1953	Al Feldstein & Al Williamson	Zero Hour	Jack Kamen
18	March/April 1953	Al Feldstein & Al Williamson	Homesick!	Al Williamson
18	March/April 1953	Al Feldstein & Al Williamson	Judgment Day!	Joe Orlando
19	May/June 1953	Al Feldstein	King of the Grey Spaces!	Bill Elder & John Severin
19	May/June 1953	Al Feldstein	Hot-Rod!	Jack Kamen
19	May/June 1953	Al Feldstein	Brain-Child!	Al Williamson
19	May/June 1953	Al Feldstein	Time For a Change!	Joe Orlando
20	July/Aug 1953	Al Feldstein	...For Us the Living	Bill Elder & John Severin
20	July/Aug 1953	Al Feldstein	I, Rocket	Al Williamson
20	July/Aug 1953	Al Feldstein	...Conquers All!	Jack Kamen
20	July/Aug 1953	Al Feldstein	The Automaton	Joe Orlando
21	Sept/Oct 1953	Al Williamson & Frank Frazetta	My Home...	Joe Orlando
21	Sept/Oct 1953	Al Williamson & Frank Frazetta	Saved	Al Williamson
21	Sept/Oct 1953	Al Williamson & Frank Frazetta	Planely Possible	Jack Kamen
21	Sept/Oct 1953	Al Williamson & Frank Frazetta	The Million Year Picnic	Bill Elder and John Severin
22	Nov/Dec 1953	Joe Orlando	The Silent Towns	Reed Crandall
22	Nov/Dec 1953	Joe Orlando	The Freaks	Jack Kamen
22	Nov/Dec 1953	Joe Orlando	The Fossil	Joe Orlando
22	Nov/Dec 1953	Joe Orlando	Derelict Ship	Bernard Krigstein
