= Impact (EC Comics) =

Comic book series from EC Comics

- Jack Davis cover, issue #1

Publication information
- Publisher: EC Comics
- Schedule: Bimonthly
- Format: Anthology
- Publication date: March/April 1955 – November/December 1955
- No. of issues: 5

Creative team
- Created by: William Gaines; Al Feldstein

Impact is a short-lived comic book series published by EC Comics in 1955 as the first title in its New Direction line.

== Overview ==
The bi-monthly comic, published by Bill Gaines and edited by Al Feldstein, began with an issue cover-dated March–April, 1955. It ran for five issues, ending with the November–December, 1955 issue. The sub-title "Tales Designed to Carry an..." ran above the title Impact. The book was dedicated to stories with shock endings, and was seen as a toned down, Comics Code era version of EC's earlier Shock SuspenStories. Front covers were by Jack Davis, and the stories were illustrated by Davis, George Evans, Jack Kamen, Graham Ingels, Joe Orlando, Reed Crandall and Bernard Krigstein.

There are two versions of the cover to Impact #1. One logo is yellow and the other is white.

The first issue featured the short story "Master Race", co-plotted by Gaines & Feldstein and illustrated by Krigstein. "Master Race" is one of the first comic book stories about The Holocaust, and has been described as the Citizen Kane of comic books.

Impact was reprinted as part of publisher Russ Cochran's Complete EC Library in 1988. Between April and August 1999, Cochran (in association with Gemstone Publishing) reprinted all five individual issues. This complete run was later rebound, with covers included, in a single softcover EC Annual. Dark Horse reprinted Impact as part of the EC Archives series in 2020.

== Issue guide ==
Page four of "Master Race," illustrated by Bernard Krigstein, which appeared in the first issue of Impact.

#	Date	Story	Story artist
1	March/April 1955	Tough Cop	Reed Crandall
1	March/April 1955	The Diamond Pendant	Graham Ingels
1	March/April 1955	The Dress	George Evans
1	March/April 1955	Master Race	Bernard Krigstein
2	May/June 1955	Mother Knows Best	Reed Crandall
2	May/June 1955	Divorce	Jack Davis
2	May/June 1955	The Suit	Graham Ingels
2	May/June 1955	Paid in Full	Joe Orlando
3	July/Aug 1955	Life Sentence	Reed Crandall
3	July/Aug 1955	The Debt	Jack Davis
3	July/Aug 1955	Totally Blind	Jack Kamen
3	July/Aug 1955	The Good Fairy	Graham Ingels
4	Sept/Oct 1955	The Lonely One	Jack Davis
4	Sept/Oct 1955	Fall in Winter	Graham Ingels
4	Sept/Oct 1955	The Bitter End	Reed Crandall
4	Sept/Oct 1955	Country Doctor	George Evans
5	Nov/Dec 1955	Heart Interest	George Evans
5	Nov/Dec 1955	The Travelers	Joe Orlando
5	Nov/Dec 1955	The General	Graham Ingels
5	Nov/Dec 1955	So Much More	Bernard Krigstein
