= Piracy (comics) =

Comic book

- Cover illustration by Bernard Krigstein

Publication information
- Publisher: EC Comics
- Schedule: Bi-monthly
- Format: Anthology
- Publication date: October/November 1954 - October/November 1955
- No. of issues: 7

Creative team
- Artist(s): Wally Wood; Reed Crandall; Bernard Krigstein; George Evans

Piracy is an EC Comics title published in the mid 1950s. The bi-monthly comic book, published by Bill Gaines and edited by Al Feldstein, began with an issue cover-dated October–November 1954. It ran for seven issues, ending with the October–November 1955 issue.

Front covers were by Wally Wood, Reed Crandall, Bernard Krigstein and George Evans. The stories of adventure on the high seas were illustrated by Wood, Crandall, Krigstein, Jack Davis, Al Williamson, Graham Ingels and Angelo Torres.

Piracy was reprinted (in black and white) as part of publisher Russ Cochran's The Complete EC Library. Between March and September 1998, Cochran (in association with Gemstone Publishing) reprinted all seven individual issues. This complete run was later rebound, with covers included, in a pair of softcover EC Annuals. Dark Horse reprinted Piracy as part of the EC Archives series in 2019.

== Issue guide ==
#	Date	Cover Artist	Story	Story Artist
1	October/November 1954	Wally Wood	The Privateer	Reed Crandall
1	October/November 1954	Wally Wood	The Mutineers	Wally Wood
1	October/November 1954	Wally Wood	Harpooned	Al Williamson & Angelo Torres
1	October/November 1954	Wally Wood	Shanghaied	Jack Davis
2	December/January 1955	Reed Crandall	Sea Food	Reed Crandall
2	December/January 1955	Reed Crandall	Kismet	Jack Davis
2	December/January 1955	Reed Crandall	The Shell Game	Al Williamson & Angelo Torres
2	December/January 1955	Reed Crandall	A Fitting End	Wally Wood
3	February/March 1955	Reed Crandall	Blackbeard	Reed Crandall
3	February/March 1955	Reed Crandall	U-Boat	Bernard Krigstein
3	February/March 1955	Reed Crandall	Mouse Trap	George Evans
3	February/March 1955	Reed Crandall	Slave Ship	Graham Ingels
4	April/May 1955	Reed Crandall	Pirate Master	Reed Crandall
4	April/May 1955	Reed Crandall	By the Book	George Evans
4	April/May 1955	Reed Crandall	The Sheba	Graham Ingels
4	April/May 1955	Reed Crandall	Inheritance	Bernard Krigstein
5	June/July 1955	Bernard Krigstein	Jean Lafitte	Reed Crandall
5	June/July 1955	Bernard Krigstein	Rag Doll	Graham Ingels
5	June/July 1955	Bernard Krigstein	Salvage	Bernard Krigstein
5	June/July 1955	Bernard Krigstein	The Keg	George Evans
6	August/September 1955	Bernard Krigstein	Fit for a King	Reed Crandall
6	August/September 1955	Bernard Krigstein	The Skipper	George Evans
6	August/September 1955	Bernard Krigstein	Fur Crazy	Graham Ingels
6	August/September 1955	Bernard Krigstein	Solitary	Jack Davis
7	October/November 1955	George Evans	Partners	Reed Crandall
7	October/November 1955	George Evans	Up the River	Bernard Krigstein
7	October/November 1955	George Evans	John's Reward	Graham Ingels
7	October/November 1955	George Evans	Temptation	George Evans

== See also ==
- List of Entertaining Comics publications
