= Shock SuspenStories =

American comic anthology series

- Shock SuspenStories #6 (Dec/Jan 1953); Cover art by Wally Wood

Publication information
- Publisher: EC Comics
- Schedule: Bi-monthly
- Format: Anthology
- Publication date: February/March 1952 – December/January 1955
- No. of issues: 18

Creative team
- Created by: Bill Gaines; Al Feldstein

Shock SuspenStories is an American bi-monthly comic book anthology series published by EC Comics from 1952 to 1955 created by Bill Gaines and Al Feldstein. The magazine began in February/March 1952 and ran for 18 issues until being discontinued after the December/January 1955 issue. It covered a broad range of topics, including crime, science fiction, and horror.

== Publication history ==
=== Original run ===
Shock SuspenStories originated in February 1952 as a "sampler" featuring stories of various genres. EC Comics publisher Bill Gaines and his editor, Al Feldstein, explained the comic's origin and the source of its title in the first issue:

We've tried to satisfy every one of you readers who have written us insisting that E.C. increase its output! Many of you wanted another science-fiction mag... you horror fans wanted another horror book... and you suspense readers wanted a companion mag to Crime SuspenStories! We decided, therefore, to make this new mag an "E.C. Sampler"... and to include in it an S-F yarn, a horror tale, a Crime SuspenStory, and... for you readers of Frontline Combat and Two-Fisted Tales... a war story! Although there was a wide variance in the types of mags requested, all of you fans seemed to agree on one thing: all of you wanted the stories to have the usual E.C. shock endings! So what could be more natural than to call the magazine Shock SuspenStories?

The war story would be immediately phased out with the second issue, replaced with a message story—the "Shock SuspenStory". Bhob Stewart discussed the "Shock SuspenStory" in his notes for the EC Library, which reprinted all 18 issues of this title:

It was evident from the cover of #2 that Gaines had conceived this title for matters of deeper concern. With "The Patriots", the "Shock SuspenStory" was born. And far from being just a label of meaningless hype, the concept proved to be a major step for EC, providing Gaines and Feldstein with a forum for expressing their views on the human condition just as Two-Fisted Tales and Frontline Combat were for Harvey Kurtzman. The Shock SuspenStory was characterized by a running theme of mob violence and an art style best described as Heightened Realism. A similarity can be noted between Wood's dramatically effective Shock renderings and the caricatures of corruption in the acclaimed fine art of Jack Levine.

Over the next three years, Shock SuspenStories tackled many controversial issues, including racism ("The Guilty" in #3, "In Gratitude" in #11), mob hysteria ("The Patriots" in #2), police corruption ("Confession" in #4), vigilantism ("Under Cover" in #6), drug addiction ("The Monkey" in #12), and rape ("The Assault" in #8, "A Kind of Justice" in #16). The sampler format remained for the remaining three stories in the title until the end of 1953. With #12, the horror and science fiction stories were phased out, and the comic then focused primarily on shock and crime stories for the remainder of its run.

Issue #14 (April/May 1954) contained two of the title's most controversial stories, "The Orphan", which featured a ten-year-old girl murdering her father and framing her mother, and "The Whipping", in which a bigoted father mistakenly beats his daughter to death under the impression that she was her Hispanic boyfriend. Gaines was questioned extensively about both stories by the United States Senate Subcommittee on Juvenile Delinquency in April 1954.

In the late 1940s and early 1950s, comic books came under attack from parents, clergymen, schoolteachers, and others who believed the magazines contributed to illiteracy and juvenile delinquency. In April and June 1954, highly publicized congressional subcommittee hearings on the effects of comic books upon children left the industry shaken. With the subsequent imposition of a highly restrictive Comics Code, which placed severe restrictions on violent comic book genres, Shock SuspenStories was one of five comics voluntarily discontinued by EC Comics publisher Bill Gaines.

=== Reprints ===
Shock SuspenStories has been reprinted on numerous occasions. Ballantine Books reprinted selected stories in a series of paperback anthologies from 1964 to 1966. The magazine was fully collected in a series of three black-and-white hardbacks by publisher Russ Cochran as part of The Complete EC Library in 1981. Cochran reprinted the entire series with Gemstone Publishing from 1992 to 1996. This complete run was later rebound, with covers included, in a series of four softcover EC Annuals. In 2006, Cochran and Gemstone began to publish hardcover, re-colored volumes of Shock SuspenStories as part of the EC Archives series. Two volumes (of a projected three) were published by Gemstone before their financial troubles left the project in limbo. The third and final volume was published by GC Press, a boutique imprint established by Cochran and Grant Geissman, in 2011. Dark Horse Comics republished the first and third volumes in 2015 and 2016. The complete three-volume series was later republished as over-sized trade paperbacks from 2021 to 2023.

== Production ==
=== Creative team ===
Front covers were drawn by Feldstein, Wally Wood, Johnny Craig, George Evans, and Jack Kamen. Kamen was the comic's most prolific artist, usually doing the lead eight-page story in each issue. Other stories were illustrated by Craig, Evans, Wood, Graham Ingels, Jack Davis, Al Williamson, Joe Orlando, Reed Crandall, Bernard Krigstein, and Frank Frazetta. Writing was handled by Gaines and Feldstein exclusively through the first 12 issues, except for a single story written by Craig. Over the last six issues, other contributing writers included Carl Wessler, Otto Binder, and Jack Oleck.

=== Influences and adaptations ===
As with the other EC comics edited by Feldstein, the stories in this comic were primarily based on Gaines using existing suspense stories and films to develop "springboards" from which he and Feldstein could launch new stories. Specific story influences that have been identified include the following:

- "Just Desserts!" (#3): Ray Bradbury's "The Smiling People"
- "Dead Right!" (#6): John Collier's "In the Cards!"
- "Under Cover!" (#6): Roald Dahl's "Beware of the Dog"
- "Seep No More!" (#8): Edgar Allan Poe's "The Tell-Tale Heart"
- "Fall Guy" (#12): Maurice Level's "The Debt Collector"
- "You, Murderer" (#14): Robert Wiene's The Cabinet of Dr. Caligari

Anecdotes from Bennett Cerf's Try and Stop Me were sources for stories, including "Yellow" (#1) and "The Patriots" (#2).

After their unauthorized adaptation of one of Ray Bradbury's stories in another magazine, Bradbury contacted EC about their plagiarism of his work. They reached an agreement for EC to do authorized versions of Bradbury's short fiction. These official adaptations include:

- "The Small Assassin" (#7)
- "The October Game" (#9)

== List of issues ==
Shock SuspenseStories issues
| Issue # | Date | Cover artist | Story title | Story artist | Summary |
|---|---|---|---|---|---|
| 1 | Feb/Mar 1952 | Al Feldstein | The Neat Job! | Jack Kamen | An abused housewife married to a neat freak snaps one day and neatly dices his body into small parts and deposits them in glass jars. |
| 1 | Feb/Mar 1952 | Al Feldstein | Yellow! | Jack Davis | A colonel's son faces the firing squad for cowardice under fire. He lies to his boy that he will have the rifles loaded with blanks and he will later smuggle the body out so that his son will go to his death like a man. |
| 1 | Feb/Mar 1952 | Al Feldstein | The Monsters! | Joe Orlando | Aliens deposit their mutant births on Earth, which to them appear as horrible monsters, but appear as regular humans to the people of Earth. |
| 1 | Feb/Mar 1952 | Al Feldstein | The Rug! | Graham Ingels | A grizzly bear skins a hunter and makes a rug out of him. |
| 2 | Apr/May 1952 | Wally Wood | Kickback! | Jack Kamen | A young woman marries an older man for his money and gets tired of caring for him after a heart attack leaves him paralyzed. She comes up with a plot to stock the cellar with canned goods for three weeks and then pretends to be locked inside while her husband starves to death. |
| 2 | Apr/May 1952 | Wally Wood | Gee Dad... It's a Daisy! | Wally Wood | Space explorers land on a planet of intelligent carnivorous plants and fall victim to a demonstration of "She loves me... She loves me not..." |
| 2 | Apr/May 1952 | Wally Wood | The Patriots! | Jack Davis | A mob whipped up by anti-communist sentiment beats to death a blind war veteran when he does not doff his hat to the flag during a parade. |
| 2 | Apr/May 1952 | Wally Wood | Halloween! | Graham Ingels | On Halloween night, when a new matron at an orphanage discovers the manager has been stealing the state's allotment for the children and threatens to strangle her to keep her quiet, the children take matters into their own hands and use his hollowed-out head as a jack-o-lantern. |
| 3 | Jun/July 1952 | Wally Wood | Just Desserts! | Jack Kamen | A madman holds a dinner party for five people who have hurt him in the past and gets revenge by decapitating them. |
| 3 | Jun/July 1952 | Wally Wood | The Guilty! | Wally Wood | A bigoted sheriff arrests a black man for the death of a white woman based on the testimony of a man who turns out to be the killer. The sheriff executes the suspect in the woods and claims he tried to escape. |
| 3 | Jun/July 1952 | Wally Wood | The Big Stand Up! | Joe Orlando | A broadcast technician falls in love with a woman whose transmission he picks up from another planet. She comes to him in a rocketship, but she stands about 200 feet (61 m) high. |
| 3 | Jun/July 1952 | Wally Wood | Stumped! | Jack Davis | A trapper moves a rival's trap hoping the man will step in it and die so that he can take over his territory. He does get caught in the trap, but his desire for revenge is so strong that he chews through his own ankle in order to kill the guilty party before he expires. |
| 4 | Aug/Sept 1952 | Wally Wood | Split Second! | Jack Kamen | When a lumberjack boss and his wife blind a young worker by hitting him in the head with a rock, the other lumberjacks gag them and stuff him in a hollow log for the blind boy to practice his ax skills. |
| 4 | Aug/Sept 1952 | Wally Wood | Confession | Wally Wood | A police lieutenant murders his wife and then beats a confession out of an innocent bystander. |
| 4 | Aug/Sept 1952 | Wally Wood | Strictly Business! | Joe Orlando | In the future, marriage licenses must be renewed every three years. A man pays a woman $30,000 to be his wife, without intimacy, for one three-year term. By the end of the period, she has fallen in love with him and tells him that she will claim she is pregnant, which will cause the license to renew automatically. He tells her that the pregnancy is impossible for a very good reason. |
| 4 | Aug/Sept 1952 | Wally Wood | Uppercut! | Jack Davis | A promoter tells the fighters he sends into the ring that they have got to have "guts." One of the washed-up cases steals a drug from his brother in medical school that will make a person look dead in order to have the promoter buried alive. When the he comes to, however, he discovers that his guts have been removed during an autopsy. |
| 5 | Oct/Nov 1952 | Wally Wood | Well-Traveled! | Jack Kamen | A henpecked husband dismembers his wife after she refuses to let him spend money on toy trains so often. |
| 5 | Oct/Nov 1952 | Wally Wood | Hate! | Wally Wood | A man goes along with a plan to set fire to a Jewish couple's home until his mother tells him he is adopted and that his biological parents were Jews. |
| 5 | Oct/Nov 1952 | Wally Wood | What Fur?! | Joe Orlando | Aliens skin humans for their pelts. |
| 5 | Oct/Nov 1952 | Wally Wood | Cold Cuts! | Jack Davis | A man murders his wife, dismembers her, and stores the parts in a meat locker. His plans to dispose of the remains are continually frustrated until his friend invites him for dinner and, after he has taken a bite, reveals to him that he borrowed the meat from the locker. |
| 6 | Dec/Jan 1953 | Wally Wood | Dead Right! | Jack Kamen | A woman marries a repulsive man after a fortune teller predicts he is going to inherit $25,000 and die shortly thereafter. What the fortune teller does not tell her is that she wins the money as a prize, and when she tries to walk out on the slob, he murders her and inherits her money before being sentenced to death in the electric chair. |
| 6 | Dec/Jan 1953 | Wally Wood | Under Cover! | Wally Wood | A reporter is a witness to the Ku Klux Klan murdering a young woman by flogging for consorting with blacks. He catches a glimpse of their leader's face and is chased and beaten, but he denies having seen anyone's face. After coming to in a hospital room, his is interviewed by two FBI agents to whom he says he can identify the KKK leader. The leader steps out from behind a screen, and the reporter is killed by the fake FBI agents and doctor. |
| 6 | Dec/Jan 1953 | Wally Wood | Not So Tough! | Joe Orlando | A space commander who is as tough as nails on his crew is reduced to soft putty in the grip of a large gravitational force. |
| 6 | Dec/Jan 1953 | Wally Wood | Sugar 'N Spice 'N... | Graham Ingels | A contemporary retelling of the fairy tale, "Hansel and Gretel" |
| 7 | Feb/Mar 1953 | Al Feldstein | Beauty and the Beach! | Jack Kamen | Two men are frustrated by the vanity of their attractive wives. One encases his wife in plastic wearing her bathing suit and the other broils his wife under 40 sun lamps. |
| 7 | Feb/Mar 1953 | Al Feldstein | The Bribe! | Wally Wood | A fire inspector commits suicide when a fire breaks out in a night club where he took a bribe to overlook code violations. He thinks his daughter was killed in the fire with the other patrons because of a photo taken of her earlier that evening, but what he does not know is that she and her fiancé have eloped and did not stay for the show. |
| 7 | Feb/Mar 1953 | Al Feldstein | Infiltration | Joe Orlando | A small government agency responsible for ferreting out Martian infiltrators is completely infested with Martians except for a sole human whom they gun down. |
| 7 | Feb/Mar 1953 | Al Feldstein | The Small Assassin! | George Evans | A mother is paranoid that her newborn baby is attempting to kill her. |
| 8 | Apr/May 1953 | Al Feldstein | Piecemeal | Jack Kamen | A woman plots to give her naturalist husband an overdose of sleeping pills so that she can be with his younger brother. Before he passes, he acquires a large shark and places it in their outdoor pool in which the wife regularly swims. |
| 8 | Apr/May 1953 | Al Feldstein | The Assault! | Wally Wood | A man kills a tramp in retribution after his wife claims to have been raped by him. |
| 8 | Apr/May 1953 | Al Feldstein | The Arrival | Al Williamson | Ninety-five thousand years after man destroys himself with nuclear weapons, evolved rats develop space travel and meet their Martian neighbors. |
| 8 | Apr/May 1953 | Al Feldstein | Seep No More! | George Evans | After a man stabs a woman to death and stashes her body in the attic, he sees a huge bloodstain spreading across his ceiling. He tries to cover it up with paint, but every morning it returns. |
| 9 | Jun/July 1953 | Al Feldstein | The October Game | Jack Kamen | A man who hates his wife plays a cruel trick on her in a darkened cellar on Halloween. He passes the body parts of a "witch" around to his party guests and their children while his increasingly frightened wife wonders where her daughter is. |
| 9 | Jun/July 1953 | Al Feldstein | Came the Dawn! | Wally Wood | A man thinks that the girl he has met in the woods may be a dangerous escaped lunatic because she matches the description, but his girlfriend ends up meeting a grim fate as the latest victim of the true escapee. |
| 9 | Jun/July 1953 | Al Feldstein | The Meddlers! | Joe Orlando | The folk of a small town attempt to drive away a doctor who is attempting to create life in a test tube. They smash his equipment while he suffers heart failure. His experiments combine in the sewer to create a blob-like living mass which devours the townsfolk. |
| 9 | Jun/July 1953 | Al Feldstein | Carrion Death! | Reed Crandall | A man handcuffed to a policeman is trying to make his way through the desert on foot. He realizes that he has to separate himself from the body but has nothing sharp with which to cut off the dead man's hand. He decides to lie down and allow the vultures to strip the corpse, but when he regains consciousness the vultures have already started in on him as well. |
| 10 | Aug/Sept 1953 | Jack Kamen | The Sacrifice | Jack Kamen | A woman manipulates a man into killing her husband by pretending to be in love with him. |
| 10 | Aug/Sept 1953 | Jack Kamen | ...So Shall Ye Reap! | Wally Wood | A young man sitting in the electric chair reflects on the events of his youth while his parents are sitting at home doing the same—each with vastly different perspectives. |
| 10 | Aug/Sept 1953 | Jack Kamen | Home Run! | Joe Orlando | Astronauts are approaching Mars when one of their number admits that he is really a Martian who designed the rocket in order to return home after crashing on Earth. |
| 10 | Aug/Sept 1953 | Jack Kamen | Sweetie-Pie | Reed Crandall | A ghoul sets up roadside hazards to procure fresh meat. |
| 11 | Oct/Nov 1953 | Johnny Craig | The Tryst! | Johnny Craig | A man is so jealous of his wife that he murders a boy from the local orphanage that she has been spending time with in the woods. |
| 11 | Oct/Nov 1953 | Johnny Craig | In Gratitude... | Wally Wood | A Korean War veteran berates his hometown because his black friend who threw himself on a grenade to save his life was not allowed to be buried in the town cemetery. |
| 11 | Oct/Nov 1953 | Johnny Craig | The Space Suitors | Reed Crandall | A woman and her lover plan to murder her husband out in space, but he outsmarts them by giving a signal to the rocket to blast off when he is shot so that his wife and her lover will be left to suffocate on the barren planetoid. |
| 11 | Oct/Nov 1953 | Johnny Craig | ...Three's a Crowd | Jack Kamen | A jealous man sends his wife and his best friend to their deaths when their suspicious behavior makes him leap to the conclusion that they are having an affair, but they are in reality planning an anniversary surprise. |
| 12 | Dec/Jan 1954 | Al Feldstein | Deadline | Jack Kamen | An alcoholic ex-reporter tries to get back on his feet after meeting a girl but becomes too involved in a story in when he gets the scoop on a murder at a diner. |
| 12 | Dec/Jan 1954 | Al Feldstein | The Monkey | Joe Orlando | A drug addict murders his father in order to get his fix. |
| 12 | Dec/Jan 1954 | Al Feldstein | The Kidnapper | Reed Crandall | A man's baby is kidnapped, and when his wife's mental health grows so bad that he desperately attempts to steal another baby, he is beaten to death by a crowd of onlookers for attempting to kidnap... his own son. |
| 12 | Dec/Jan 1954 | Al Feldstein | Fall Guy | Wally Wood | A hotel clerk steals $100,000 from a diamond merchant and rents a safe deposit box years in advance under the name Brad Gilbert. After serving ten years for the theft, he meets up with the girl who promised to wait for him because she wants the money, but he cannot rememember the pseudonym he used for the deposit box. |
| 13 | Feb/Mar 1954 | Jack Kamen | Only Skin-Deep | Jack Kamen | A man comes out of a car accident with amnesia and undergoes plastic surgery to reconstruct extensive facial burns. He is met by a woman who claims to be his lover and that the two of them plotted to murder her husband for his insurance money. When his memory returns, he recalls that he is not her lover but actually her husband who had overheard their plans to kill him. |
| 13 | Feb/Mar 1954 | Jack Kamen | Blood-Brothers | Wally Wood | A bigot finds out that his life was saved as a child by a blood transfusion from a black man. |
| 13 | Feb/Mar 1954 | Jack Kamen | Upon Reflection | Reed Crandall | A boxer feels guilty for killing a man in the ring when the man's widow screams at him that he is a "beast". He perceives that his hands and face are taking on the appearance of a gorilla but a psychologist tells him that it is all in his mind. Or is it? |
| 13 | Feb/Mar 1954 | Jack Kamen | Squeeze Play | Frank Frazetta | A young man gets a girl pregnant and then murders her by throwing her out of a roller coaster car. |
| 14 | Apr/May 1954 | Wally Wood | The Orphan | Jack Kamen | A little girl murders her drunken father and frames her uncaring mother for the crime so that she can go live with her nice aunt. |
| 14 | Apr/May 1954 | Wally Wood | The Whipping | Wally Wood | A bigot hates his daughter's Mexican husband and tries to force her to leave him. He finally decides to round up a lynch mob to beat the man to death, but when the husband walks in on them, the father discovers the victim was his daughter—the mob had grabbed her by mistake as she waited for her husband to come home from work. |
| 14 | Apr/May 1954 | Wally Wood | You, Murderer | Bernard Krigstein | A hypnotist picks a victim to do his dirty work for a killing after his wife leaves him for another man. |
| 14 | Apr/May 1954 | Wally Wood | As Ye Sow... | George Evans | A husband hires a contract killer to trail his wife and murder the man she meets. The woman reconsiders her affair, decides to call it off, and returns to her husband. The husband is glad to have her back until he remembers his deal with the hitman. |
| 15 | Jun/July 1954 | Jack Kamen | Raw Deal | Jack Kamen | A man cannibalizes his new bride to survive being stranded at sea. |
| 15 | Jun/July 1954 | Jack Kamen | The Confidant | Wally Wood | A mob beats a priest to death when he refuses to betray the confession of a killer. |
| 15 | Jun/July 1954 | Jack Kamen | For Cryin' Out Loud! | Reed Crandall | A man's conscience bothers him so much after he strangles a woman that he has an uncontrollable urge to confess the deed to anyone in earshot. |
| 15 | Jun/July 1954 | Jack Kamen | Well Trained | George Evans | A detective arrests the male burglar who murdered his wife when she surprised him and, after a brutal beating that hospitalizes him, continues to hound him in the hospital about the death he will receive in the electric chair. |
| 16 | Aug/Sept 1954 | George Evans | ...My Brother's Keeper | George Evans | An evil Siamese twin commits murder, but the state does not execute him as it would mean the death of the good one. The good one must do something to stop his evil half. |
| 16 | Aug/Sept 1954 | George Evans | The Hazing | Joe Orlando | A college student wants to join a fraternity, so he makes up a story about a professor they do not like being a communist in order to get him fired. |
| 16 | Aug/Sept 1954 | George Evans | A Kind of Justice | Reed Crandall | A mob beats a vagrant to death for the rape of a sixteen-year-old girl that was actually being violated by the town sheriff. |
| 16 | Aug/Sept 1954 | George Evans | The Pen is Mightier | Jack Kamen | A newspaper columnist murders his gangster friend to get his wife and frames an innocent man for the crime through the power of his words. |
| 17 | Oct/Nov 1954 | George Evans | 4-Sided Triangle | Jack Kamen | A farmer tries to molest a intellectually-disabled girl he keeps on the farm to work as a servant. When he dresses up as the scarecrow she is "in love" with to get what he wants from the girl, his wife tries to demonstrate to her that it is only straw by repeatedly stabbing the scarecrow with the pitchfork. |
| 17 | Oct/Nov 1954 | George Evans | In Character | Reed Crandall | Bela Kardiff (modelled after the actors Bela Lugosi and Boris Karloff) murders all of his Hollywood contacts after he has been typecast in pictures. |
| 17 | Oct/Nov 1954 | George Evans | The Assassin | George Evans | An assassin unknowingly pursues his mark backstage at a theater and kills the man just before the curtain rises. |
| 17 | Oct/Nov 1954 | George Evans | The Operation | Joe Orlando | A jewel thief/surgeon cuts open his two goons to smuggle diamonds into the country in their bodies. When he gets a big one worth $250,000, he operates on both of them, so they will not know who has the diamond and be tempted to disappear. After greed get the best of both of them, they kill each other, but the diamond is not found. |
| 18 | Dec/Jan 1955 | George Evans | Cadillac Fever! | George Evans | A poor girl knows her father will never be able to afford to buy a Cadillac. Se murders her mother and swears in court that the father did it. After he is executed, he gets his long sought after ride in a Cadillac hearse. |
| 18 | Dec/Jan 1955 | George Evans | The Trap | Jack Kamen | A husband is betrayed by his wife and a funeral director when they plot to commit fraud to collect on his life insurance policy for his own murder. |
| 18 | Dec/Jan 1955 | George Evans | In the Bag | Bernard Krigstein | A cop kills a man with a bowling ball in a bag thinking it is a head. |
| 18 | Dec/Jan 1955 | George Evans | Rundown | Reed Crandall | A man commits murder attempting to acquire enough money to win back his wife's affection. He does not know that she and her lover have already made a plot to run him down. |

== In other media ==
Some stories were adapted for the HBO television series Tales from the Crypt, which features John Kassir as the voice of the Crypt-Keeper and included comic book covers designed by Mike Vosburg—with at least one drawn by Shawn McManus—to look like the original 1950s covers. The series ran for seven seasons from 1989 to 1996 and spawned 93 episodes.

The following stories were used in HBO's Tales from the Crypt TV series: "Yellow!" (#1), "Confession" (#4), "Split Second!" (#4), "Dead Right!" (#6), "The Bribe!" (#7), "Came the Dawn!" (#9), "Carrion Death!" (#9), "The Sacrifice" (#10), "...Three's a Crowd" (#11), "Deadline" (#12), "The Kidnapper" (#12), "As Ye Sow..." (#14), "You, Murderer" (14#), "For Cryin' Out Loud!" (#15), "...My Brother's Keeper" (#16), "The Assassin" (#17), "4-Sided Triangle" (#17), and "The Trap" (#18).

== Sources ==
- Von Bernewitz, Grant; Geissman, Skip (2000). Tales of Terror: The EC Companion. Seattle: Fantagraphics Books. ISBN 978-1-56097-403-1.
