= Incredible Science Fiction =

American science fiction anthology comic

- Cover art for issue #33 by Wally Wood.

Publication information
- Publisher: EC Comics
- Schedule: Bimonthly
- Format: Anthology
- Publication date: July/August 1955 – January/February 1956
- No. of issues: 4

Creative team
- Created by: William Gaines; Al Feldstein

Incredible Science Fiction is an American science fiction anthology comic published by EC Comics in 1955 and 1956, lasting a total of four issues.

== Creative team ==
Incredible Science Fiction ran for four issues, boasting a number of skilled artists including Jack Davis, Wally Wood, Bernard Krigstein, Joe Orlando and Roy Krenkel. Three of its covers were done by Davis, with the final issue's cover by Wood. This comic is notable for having Jack Davis' only science fiction work for EC. Roy Krenkel also provided his only solo story for EC with issue 31's "Time to Leave".

The story "Food For Thought" from issue 32 (which featured art predominantly from Al Williamson but also Roy Krenkel as well) was awarded best artwork for an individual science fiction story at the 1972 EC Fan-Addict Convention.

== History ==
=== Origin ===
Incredible Science Fiction was a retitled version of the comic Weird Science-Fantasy, which changed its title in 1955. The comic changed its title with issue 30, but due to attempts to save money on postage, the numbering did not restart (and hence, issue 30 is actually the first issue of this title).

=== Comics Code ===
Aside from the title change, Incredible Science Fiction was also different from its predecessor because it now had to follow the tight standards of the Comics Code, which was created in 1954 to censor the controversial comics of that time. Eventually the Comics Code would spell the end of not only this comic, but all comics produced by EC. When a story in issue 33 did not meet the standards of the Code, publisher Bill Gaines and editor Al Feldstein decided to reprint the story "Judgment Day!" (originally in Weird Fantasy #18). A powerful anti-racism story, "Judgment Day!" was also rejected because Judge Charles Murphy, the Comics Code Administrator, demanded that an illustration of a black astronaut be altered. Gaines refused and threatened to take the matter to the Supreme Court. The Comics Code backed down, and Gaines then printed the story without any changes. But Gaines had seen the writing on the wall, and he left the comic book industry soon after. Incredible Science Fiction #33 was the last comic book he would publish.

=== Reprints ===
Incredible Science Fiction has been reprinted by EC-fan and publisher Russ Cochran on a couple of occasions. It formed part of his Complete EC Library (in 1982), published (in black and white) as a slipcased hardcover two-volume set alongside Weird Science-Fantasy. It was also reprinted issue-by-issue between August 1994 and May 1995 by Cochran (in association with Gemstone Publishing). This complete run was later rebound, again alongside Weird Science-Fantasy, with covers included, in a pair of softcover EC Annuals. Dark Horse reprinted Incredible Science Fiction as part of the EC Archives series in 2017.

=== Resurfacing ===
The title resurfaced in a 1974 fantasy story, "Present Perfect", by Thomas F. Monteleone. The story focuses on William Rutherford, who is the editor of a speculative fiction magazine titled Incredible Science Fiction. After rejecting one story after another, he picks up a manuscript which is Monteleone's "Present Perfect". This tale was published in Fantastic (September 1974). Such recursive plotting was employed several times by EC, including "The Aliens", illustrated by Al Williamson for Weird Fantasy #17 (January–February 1953).

== Media Adaptations ==
HBO's Perversions of Science was a science fiction/horror anthology series with episodes adapted from stories found in Incredible Science Fiction, Weird Fantasy, and Weird Science. Only one episode in the series was adapted from an Incredible Science Fiction story; "Ultimate Weapon" (Incredible Science Fiction #32).

== Issues ==
#	Date	Cover Artist	Story	Story Artist
30	July/Aug 1955	Jack Davis	Clean Start	Wally Wood
30	July/Aug 1955	Jack Davis	Marbles	Bernard Krigstein
30	July/Aug 1955	Jack Davis	Conditioned Reflex	Joe Orlando
30	July/Aug 1955	Jack Davis	Barrier	Jack Davis
31	Sept/Oct 1955	Jack Davis	You, Rocket	Wally Wood
31	Sept/Oct 1955	Jack Davis	Fulfillment	Bernard Krigstein
31	Sept/Oct 1955	Jack Davis	Time to Leave	Roy Krenkel
31	Sept/Oct 1955	Jack Davis	Has-Been	Wally Wood
32	Nov/Dec 1955	Jack Davis	Fallen Idol	Joe Orlando
32	Nov/Dec 1955	Jack Davis	Food For Thought	Al Williamson
32	Nov/Dec 1955	Jack Davis	The Ultimate Weapon	Bernard Krigstein
32	Nov/Dec 1955	Jack Davis	Marked Man	Jack Davis
33	Jan/Feb 1956	Wally Wood	Big Moment	Wally Wood
33	Jan/Feb 1956	Wally Wood	Kaleidoscope	Jack Davis
33	Jan/Feb 1956	Wally Wood	One Way Hero	Bernard Krigstein
33	Jan/Feb 1956	Wally Wood	Judgment Day!	Joe Orlando
