= Extra! (comics) =

Short-lived American comic book magazine

- Johnny Craig cover, issue #1

Publication information
- Publisher: EC Comics
- Schedule: Bimonthly
- Format: Anthology
- Publication date: March/April 1955 - November/December 1955
- No. of issues: 5

Creative team
- Created by: William Gaines; Johnny Craig

Extra! is an American comic book magazine published by EC Comics in 1955 as the third title in its New Direction line. The bi-monthly comic was published by Bill Gaines and edited by Johnny Craig. It lasted a total of five issues before being cancelled, along with EC's other New Direction comics.

Extra! was dedicated to stories about the adventures of various journalists, who alternated as protagonists: Keith Michaels, Steve Rampart and Geri Hamilton. The rotational use was similar to the Ghoulunatics in EC's three horror comics.

The contributors to this title include Craig, John Severin, and Reed Crandall. Craig was responsible for the art on the Keith Michaels stories. Severin handled the Steve Rampart stories while Crandall covered the Geri Hamilton ones. Craig was responsible for the art for all five covers.

Extra! was reprinted as part of publisher Russ Cochran's Complete EC Library in 1988. Between January and May 2000, Cochran (in association with Gemstone Publishing) reprinted all five individual issues. This complete run was later rebound, with covers included, in a single softcover EC Annual. Dark Horse reprinted Extra! as part of the EC Archives series in 2018.

== Issue guide ==
| # | Date | Story | Story Artist | Protagonist |
|---|---|---|---|---|
| 1 | March/April 1955 | Dateline: Cayo Romano, Cuba! | Johnny Craig | Keith Michaels |
| 1 | March/April 1955 | Camera! | John Severin | Steve Rampart |
| 1 | March/April 1955 | Holiday For Macduff | Reed Crandall | Jock MacDuff |
| 1 | March/April 1955 | Dateline: Key West! | Johnny Craig | Keith Michaels |
| 2 | May/June 1955 | Dateline: Oslo | Johnny Craig | Keith Michaels |
| 2 | May/June 1955 | Stromboli! | John Severin | Steve Rampart |
| 2 | May/June 1955 | Hong Kong! | Reed Crandall | Geri Hamilton |
| 2 | May/June 1955 | Dateline: New York City | Johnny Craig | Keith Michaels |
| 3 | July/August 1955 | Dateline: Algiers | Johnny Craig | Keith Michaels |
| 3 | July/August 1955 | Steve Rampart | John Severin | Steve Rampart |
| 3 | July/August 1955 | Geri Hamilton | Reed Crandall | Geri Hamilton |
| 3 | July/August 1955 | Dateline: Paris | Johnny Craig | Keith Michaels |
| 4 | September/October 1955 | Dateline: New York City | Johnny Craig | Keith Michaels |
| 4 | September/October 1955 | Steve Rampart | John Severin | Steve Rampart |
| 4 | September/October 1955 | Geri Hamilton | Reed Crandall | Geri Hamilton |
| 4 | September/October 1955 | Dateline: Rio Para | Johnny Craig | Keith Michaels |
| 5 | November/December 1955 | Dateline: Long Island Sound | Johnny Craig | Keith Michaels |
| 5 | November/December 1955 | Steve Rampart | John Severin | Steve Rampart |
| 5 | November/December 1955 | Geri Hamilton | Reed Crandall | Geri Hamilton |
| 5 | November/December 1955 | Dateline: Germersheim | Johnny Craig | Keith Michaels |
