= Two-Fisted Tales =

Comic book

- Cover illustration by Harvey Kurtzman

Publication information
- Publisher: EC Comics
- Schedule: Bi-monthly
- Format: Anthology
- Publication date: November/December 1950 – February 1955
- No. of issues: 24

Creative team
- Created by: William Gaines; Harvey Kurtzman

Two-Fisted Tales is an anthology war comic published bi-monthly by EC Comics in the early 1950s. The title originated in 1950 when Harvey Kurtzman suggested to William Gaines that they publish an adventure comic. Kurtzman became the editor of Two-Fisted Tales, and with the dawn of the Korean War, he soon narrowed the focus to war stories. The title was a companion comic to Frontline Combat, and stories Kurtzman wrote for both books often displayed an anti-war attitude. It returned to adventure-themed stories in issues #36 through #39, co-edited by John Severin and Colin Dawkins, with a cover-title change to The New Two-Fisted Tales.

The bimonthly title ran 24 issues, numbered 18–41, from 1950 to 1955. In 1952, EC published Two-Fisted Annual which had no new stories but instead bound together past issues of Two-Fisted Tales with a new cover by Kurtzman. The same procedure was repeated in 1953 for an annual with a new Jack Davis cover.

Years after its demise, Two-Fisted Tales was reprinted in its entirety and was adapted to television.

== Publication history ==
=== Numbering ===
As with many EC comics published at the time, Two-Fisted Tales did not start with issue number one; a renaming of The Haunt of Fear, Two-Fisted Tales began with issue #18 (cover-dated Dec. 1950) and ran 24 issues through #41 (March 1955). Wholesaler problems had caused Gaines to consider canceling The Haunt of Fear, but he changed his mind without skipping an issue. Two-Fisted Tales took over the numbering, and The Haunt of Fear then reverted to the correct numbering for the remainder of its run.

=== Development ===
Two-Fisted Annual (1953). Cover art by Jack Davis

Kurtzman's editing approach to Two-Fisted Tales and Frontline Combat was a stark contrast to fellow EC editor Al Feldstein's style. Whereas Feldstein allowed his artists to draw the story however they chose, Kurtzman prepared detailed layouts for each story and required his artists to follow them exactly. Kurtzman's writing tended to use less text than Feldstein's, which enabled the two war titles to be hand-lettered rather than machine-lettered like the remainder of EC's titles. Kurtzman was dedicated to making the stories as historically accurate as possible and along with assistant Jerry DeFuccio put a lot of research into each story. As a result, where Feldstein took generally about a week to complete each issue he edited, Kurtzman took approximately a month.

=== Change in format and demise ===
Two-Fisted Tales was published with a companion title, Frontline Combat, for most of its run. Towards the end of 1953, a decrease in interest due to the end of the Korean War, as well as Kurtzman becoming overwhelmed with his work on Mad required changes to be made. Frontline Combat was dropped entirely while Two-Fisted Tales was changed from bi-monthly to quarterly publication. As sales continued to drop, Gaines was forced to fold the title. Over its four-year span, the comic ran for 24 issues, ending with issue 41, in February 1955.

=== Reprints ===
Two-Fisted Tales has been reprinted several times. It was fully reprinted in a series of four black-and-white hardcover books by publisher Russ Cochran as part of The Complete EC Library in 1980. Between October 1992 and July 1998, Cochran, in association with Gemstone Publishing, reprinted all 24 issues. This complete run was later rebound, with covers included, in a series of five softcover EC Annuals. In 2007, Cochran and Gemstone began to publish hardcover, digitally colored volumes of Two-Fisted Tales as part of the EC Archives series. Two volumes of a projected four were published before the project fell into limbo. Dark Horse resumed publication of the series in 2014, releasing the fourth and final volume in 2019.

=== Revival ===
In 1993, Dark Horse Comics published two issues of Harvey Kurtzman's The New Two-Fisted Tales, featuring war stories by contemporary creators. The first was published April 1, 1993 and the last August 1, 1993. They contained four stories in both issues.

== Notable creators ==
Two-Fisted Annual (1952). Cover art by Harvey Kurtzman.

Artists who contributed included Kurtzman and other EC regulars such as John Severin, Jack Davis, Wally Wood, George Evans, Will Elder, Reed Crandall and Bernard Krigstein. Non-EC regulars that contributed to the comic included Alex Toth, Ric Estrada, Gene Colan, Joe Kubert and Dave Berg.

Kurtzman wrote the majority of the book's stories from 1950 through 1953, with Jerry DeFuccio contributing one-page text stories and the occasional regular story as well. Colin Dawkins provided the writing for the majority of the stories for 1954 and 1955, with contributions from Davis, Evans and Severin. John Putnam, who scripted "Dien Bien Phu!" (#40), later became the art director of EC's Mad.

== Themes ==
=== Anti-war message ===
The stories Kurtzman wrote for this title often displayed an anti-war attitude. Canadian journalist Mitchell Brown wrote about the impact and influence of Kurtzman's approach: "Unlike other magazines of the day, no one could accuse Two-Fisted Tales of being wartime propaganda. On the contrary, the magazine was a brutally honest look at battles and wars throughout history. Kurtzman, who had been drafted in 1942, knew warfare firsthand, and he was outraged by the gung-ho war comics that made war look like a glorious thing. In his stories, there were no heroes—just soldiers trapped in situations beyond their control. Often, his stories weren't about soldiers at all, focusing instead on the lives of innocent people scarred by war."

Kurtzman discussed his approach to Two-Fisted Tales in a 1980 interview:

When I thought of doing a war book, the business of what to say about war was very important to me and was uppermost in my mind, because I did then feel very strongly about not wanting to say anything glamorous about war, and everything that went before Two-Fisted Tales had glamorized war. Nobody had done anything on the depressing aspects of war, and this, to me, was such a dumb—it was a terrible disservice to the children.

=== Other themes ===
In addition to contemporary stories about the Korean War and World War II, Two-Fisted Tales and Frontline Combat contained a number of stories taking place in historical settings, including the Civil War, the Revolutionary War and ancient Rome.

A series of special issues dedicated to the Civil War included issues 31 and 35 (whose cover depicts an apparently pro-Confederacy message) of Two-Fisted Tales and issue 9 of Frontline Combat. Although originally planned to be seven issues in total, the series was never completed.

== In other media ==
=== TV film adaptation ===
In 1991, the comic book was adapted for a TV film by producers Joel Silver, Richard Donner, Robert Zemeckis and others. Apart from an opening montage of covers from the comic book and use of comic's logo, the movie had little connection with Kurtzman's creation. In imitation of EC's horror books, the anthology drama featured ghostly gunfighter Mr. Rush (Bill Sadler) as a host and a device to connect the segments, although Kurtzman's war-adventure stories had never been introduced by a host. Two of the stories, "Showdown" and "King of the Road", were original scripts and not adaptations from EC (although "Showdown" did share a title with a story from issue 37). The third story, "Yellow", was adapted from a story written by Al Feldstein and illustrated by Jack Davis for the first issue of EC's Shock SuspenStories. The film had a single telecast in the USA on January 18, 1992, generating little interest, and "Showdown" and "King of the Road" were later extracted to become individual episodes of HBO's Tales From The Crypt television series ("Yellow" was exhibited as an episode in the year before).

== Popular culture ==
Welsh drum and bass and electronic music producer and DJ Lincoln Barrett adopted the name Two Fisted Tales as a pseudonym under which to produce primarily house music tracks.

== Issue guide ==
#	Date	Cover Artist	Story	Story Artist
18	Nov/Dec 1950	Harvey Kurtzman	Conquest	Harvey Kurtzman
			Hong Kong Intrigue	Al Feldstein
			Revolution	Wally Wood
			Mutiny	Johnny Craig
19	Jan/Feb 1951	Harvey Kurtzman	War Story	John Severin & Bill Elder
			Jivaro Death	Harvey Kurtzman
			Flight from Danger	Johnny Craig
			Brutal Capt. Bull	Wally Wood
20	Mar/Apr 1951	Harvey Kurtzman	Massacred	John Severin & Bill Elder
			Colt Single Action Army Revolver	Jack Davis
			Pirate Gold	Harvey Kurtzman
			Dark Side of the Moon	Wally Wood
21	May/June 1951	Harvey Kurtzman	Ambush	Jack Davis
			Pigs of the Roman Empire	John Severin & Bill Elder
			The Murmansk Run	Wally Wood
			Search	Harvey Kurtzman
22	July/Aug 1951	Harvey Kurtzman	Enemy Contact	Jack Davis
			Dying City	Alex Toth
			Massacre at Agincourt	Wally Wood
			Chicken	John Severin & Bill Elder
23	Sept/Oct 1951	Harvey Kurtzman	Death Stand	Jack Davis
			Old Soldiers Never Die	Wally Wood
			Kill	Harvey Kurtzman
			Dog Fight	John Severin & Bill Elder
24	Nov/Dec 1951	Harvey Kurtzman	Hill 203	Jack Davis
			Bug Out	Wally Wood
			Rubble	Harvey Kurtzman
			Weak Link	John Severin & Bill Elder
25	Jan/Feb 1952	Harvey Kurtzman	Mud	Jack Davis
			Bunker Hill	Wally Wood
			Corpse On the Imjin	Harvey Kurtzman
			Buzz Bomb	John Severin & Bill Elder
26	Mar/Apr 1952	Harvey Kurtzman	The Trap	John Severin
			Hagaru-Ri	Jack Davis
			Link-Up	John Severin & Bill Elder
			Hungnam	Wally Wood
27	May/June 1952	Harvey Kurtzman	Luck	John Severin & Bill Elder
			Custer's Last Stand	Wally Wood
			D-Day	John Severin
			Jeep	Jack Davis
28	July/Aug 1952	Harvey Kurtzman	Checkers	John Severin & Bill Elder
			Pell's Point	Wally Wood
			Alamo	John Severin
			Saipan	Jack Davis
29	Sept/Oct 1952	Harvey Kurtzman	Korea	Jack Davis
			Red Knight	John Severin
			Washington	John Severin & Bill Elder
			Fire Mission	Dave Berg
30	Nov/Dec 1952	Jack Davis	Bunker	Ric Estrada
			Knights	Wally Wood
			Wake	Gene Colan
			Fledgling	Jack Davis
31	Jan/Feb 1953	Harvey Kurtzman	Blockade	Wally Wood
			Campaign	John Severin & Bill Elder
			Donelson	Jack Davis
			Grant	John Severin & Bill Elder
32	Mar/Apr 1953	Wally Wood	Silent Service	Jack Davis
			Lost Battalion	Johnny Craig
			Hannibal	Wally Wood
			Tide	Joe Kubert
33	May/June 1953	Wally Wood	Signal Corps	Jack Davis
			Outpost	John Severin
			Pearl Divers	Joe Kubert
			Atom Bomb	Wally Wood
34	July/Aug 1953	Jack Davis	Betsy	Jack Davis
			Trial By Arms	Wally Wood
			En Crapaudine	John Severin
			Guynemer	George Evans
35	October 1953	Jack Davis	Robert E. Lee	John Severin
			New Orleans	Wally Wood
			Memphis	Reed Crandall
			Chancellorsville	Jack Davis
36	January 1954	John Severin	Gunfire	Jack Davis
			Battle	Reed Crandall
			Justice	John Severin
			Dangerous Man	John Severin & Bill Elder
37	April 1954	John Severin	Action	John Severin
			Warrior	John Severin
			Homemade Blitz	John Severin
			Showdown	John Severin
38	July 1954	John Severin	Lost City	John Severin
			Warpath	John Severin
			Bullets	John Severin
			Stampede	John Severin
39	Oct 1954	John Severin	Uranium Valley	John Severin
			Oregon Trail	John Severin
			The Secret	John Severin
			Slaughter	John Severin
40	Jan 1955	George Evans	Dien Bien Phu	John Severin
			Flaming Coffins	George Evans
			Last of the Mohicans	Jack Davis
			Sharpshooter	John Severin
41	March 1955	Jack Davis	Code of Honor	John Severin
			Mau-Mau	Bernie Krigstein
			Carl Akely	Wally Wood
			Yellow	George Evans

== Sources ==
- Goulart, Ron. Great American Comic Books. Publications International, Ltd., 2001. ISBN 0-7853-5590-1.
- Overstreet, Robert M.. Official Overstreet Comic Book Price Guide. House of Collectibles, 2004.
- von Bernewitz, Fred. Tales of Terror: The EC Companion. Fantagraphics Books, 2000. ISBN 1-56097-403-6.
