= Frontline Combat =

War Comic literature in the early 50's

- Frontline Combat #8 (September–October 1952); Cover by Harvey Kurtzman

Publication information
- Publisher: EC Comics
- Schedule: Bi-monthly
- Format: Anthology
- Publication date: July/August 1951 – January 1954
- No. of issues: 15

Creative team
- Created by: Harvey Kurtzman
- Written by: Harvey Kurtzman
- Artist(s): Various
- Editor(s): Harvey Kurtzman

Frontline Combat is an anthology war comic book written and edited by Harvey Kurtzman and published bi-monthly by EC Comics. The first issue was cover dated July/August, 1951. It ran for 15 issues over three years, and ended with the January, 1954 issue. Publication was discontinued following a decline in sales attributed to the end of the Korean War. The title was a companion to Kurtzman's comic book Two-Fisted Tales. Both titles depicted the horrors of war realistically and in great detail, exposing what Kurtzman saw as the truth about war without glamorizing or idealizing it.

== Artists and writers ==
Artists who contributed included Kurtzman and EC regulars such as John Severin, Jack Davis, Wally Wood, George Evans and Will Elder. Non-EC regulars who contributed included Alex Toth, Ric Estrada, Joe Kubert and Russ Heath.

Kurtzman wrote the majority of the comic's stories with Jerry DeFuccio contributing one-page text stories and an occasional regular story. The issues included writing contributions from artists Davis, Wood and Evans.

== Stories and themes ==
In addition to contemporary stories about the Korean War and World War II, Two-Fisted Tales and Frontline Combat contained a number of stories taking place in historical settings, including the Civil War, the Revolutionary War and ancient Rome.

A series of special issues dedicated to the Civil War included issues 31 and 35 of Two-Fisted Tales and issue 9 of Frontline Combat. Although originally planned to be seven issues in total, the series was never completed. Other special issues of Frontline Combat included an issue dedicated to Iwo Jima (issue 7) and an issue dedicated to the Air Force (issue 12).

== Development ==
Kurtzman's editing approach to Two Fisted Tales and Frontline Combat was a stark contrast to EC editor Al Feldstein's style. Whereas Feldstein allowed his artists to draw the story in any manner they desired, Kurtzman developed detailed layouts for each story and required his artists to follow them exactly. Kurtzman's writing tended to have a lot less text in them than Feldstein's, which enabled the two war titles to be hand-lettered rather than machine-lettered like the remainder of EC's titles. Kurtzman was also dedicated to making the stories as historically accurate as possible and, along with assistant DeFuccio, put a lot of research into each story. As a result, where Feldstein took generally about a week to complete each issue he edited, Kurtzman took approximately a month.

== Reprints ==
Frontline Combat has been reprinted several times in the years since its demise. It was fully reprinted in a series of three black-and-white hardbacks by publisher Russ Cochran as part of The Complete EC Library in 1982. Between August 1995 and February 1999, Cochran (in association with Gemstone Publishing) reprinted the full 15 individual issues. This complete run was later rebound, with covers included, in a series of three softcover EC Annuals. In 2008, Cochran and Gemstone began to publish hardcover, re-colored volumes of Frontline Combat as part of the EC Archives series. One volume (of a projected three) was published before Gemstone's financial troubles left the project in limbo. Dark Horse resumed publication of the series in 2019, releasing the third and final volume in 2021.

== Issue guide ==
#	Date	Cover Artist	Story	Story Artist
1	July/Aug 1951	Harvey Kurtzman	Marines Retreat!	John Severin & Harvey Kurtzman
			Enemy Assault!	Jack Davis
			O.P.!	Russ Heath
			Unterseeboot 113	Wally Wood
2	Sept/Oct 1951	Harvey Kurtzman	Bouncing Bertha	Jack Davis
			Zero Hour!	John Severin & Bill Elder
			Gettysburg!	Wally Wood
			Contact!	Harvey Kurtzman
3	Nov/Dec 1951	Harvey Kurtzman	Tin Can!	Jack Davis
			Desert Fox!	Wally Wood
			Prisoner of War!	Harvey Kurtzman
			How They Die!	John Severin & Bill Elder
4	Jan/Feb 1952	Harvey Kurtzman	Combat Medic!	Jack Davis
			Light Brigade!	Wally Wood
			Air Burst!	Harvey Kurtzman
			Bomb Run!	John Severin & Bill Elder
5	March/April 1952	Harvey Kurtzman	442nd Combat Team	John Severin & Bill Elder
			Stonewall Jackson!	Jack Davis
			War Machines!	John Severin
			Big 'If'!	Harvey Kurtzman
6	May/June 1952	Harvey Kurtzman	A Platoon!	John Severin & Bill Elder
			War of 1812!	Wally Wood
			Ace!	John Severin
			Bellyrobber!	Jack Davis
7	July/Aug 1952	Harvey Kurtzman	Iwo Jima!	Wally Wood
			The Landing!	John Severin & Bill Elder
			The Caves!	John Severin
			Mopping Up!	Jack Davis
8	Sept/Oct 1952	Harvey Kurtzman	Thunderjet!	Alex Toth
			Caesar!	Wally Wood
			Chickamauga!	Jack Davis
			Night Patrol!	John Severin & Bill Elder
9	Nov/Dec 1952	Harvey Kurtzman	Abe Lincoln!	Jack Davis
			First Shot!	John Severin & Bill Elder
			Choose Sides!	Wally Wood
			Bull Run!	John Severin
10	Jan/Feb 1953	John Severin & Bill Elder	A Baby!	Wally Wood
			Geronimo!	John Severin & Bill Elder
			Napoleon!	George Evans
			Anzio!	Jack Davis
11	March/April 1953	Jack Davis	Bird-Dogs!	John Severin & Bill Elder
			Rough Riders!	Ric Estrada
			Lufbery!	George Evans
			Sailor!	Jack Davis
12	May/June 1953	Jack Davis	F-94!	George Evans
			F-86 Sabre Jet!	Alex Toth
			B-26 Invader!	Jack Davis
			H-5	Wally Wood
13	July/Aug 1953	Wally Wood	Pantherjet!	Jack Davis
			War Dance!	John Severin
			Wolf!	Wally Wood
			Frank Luke!	George Evans
14	Oct 1953	Wally Wood	Albatross!	Wally Wood
			Bonhomme Richard!	Joe Kubert
			Immelman!	George Evans
			Whupped!	Jack Davis
15	Jan 1954	Wally Wood	Perimeter!	Wally Wood
			McCudden!	George Evans
			Vengeful Sioux!	Jack Davis
			Belts N' Celts!	John Severin
