= Graham Ingels =

American illustrator

- Born: June 7, 1915 Cincinnati
- Died: April 4, 1991 (aged 75)
- Area: Artist
- Notable works: The Haunt of Fear and Tales from the Crypt
- Awards: Inkwell Awards 2024 SASRA

Graham John Ingels (/ˈɪŋɡəlz/; June 7, 1915 – April 4, 1991) was a comic book and magazine illustrator best known for his work in EC Comics during the 1950s, notably on The Haunt of Fear and Tales from the Crypt, horror titles written and edited by Al Feldstein, and The Vault of Horror, written and edited by Feldstein and Johnny Craig. Ingels' flair for horror led EC to promote him as Ghastly Graham Ingels, and he began signing his work "Ghastly" in 1952.

== Pulp illustrator ==
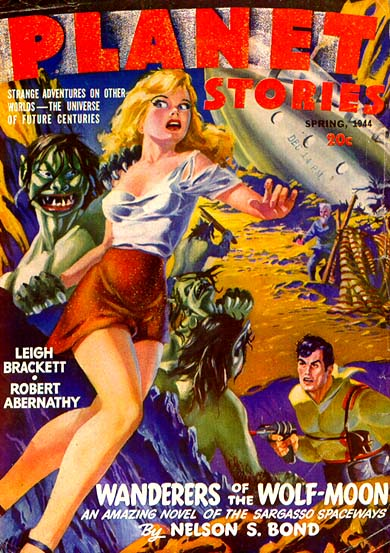
Planet Stories, Spring 1944 – Ingels's only cover for a science fiction pulp, illustrating Nelson S. Bond's "Wanderers of the Wolf Moon"

Born in Cincinnati, Ingels began working at age 14 after the death of his father, commercial artist Don Ingels. Graham was 16 when he entered the art field drawing theater displays. He studied at New York's Hawthorne School of Art.

Graham and Gertrude Ingels married when he was starting as a freelancer at age 20. He entered the U.S. Navy in 1943, and he began working that same year for Fiction House Publications, both in their pulp magazines and their comic book division. Black and white illustrations signed G. Ingels appeared in Planet Stories, Jungle Stories, North-West Romances and Wings. He contributed one painted cover to a 1944 issue of Planet Stories as well. For Planet Comics, he illustrated stories in the "Hunt Bowman" series and the "Auro, Lord of Jupiter" series. He also painted a mural at the United Nations building.

The Ingels had two children, Deanna (born 1937) and Robby (born 1946), who was named after a character created by child impersonator Lenore Ledoux for the Baby Snooks radio program. Artist Howard Nostrand, a friend of Ingels, recalled:

Robby was short for Robespierre. The reason why they called him that was left over from the old Fanny Brice show, Baby Snooks. Baby Snooks had a little kid brother named Robespierre. They called him that when he was a little kid, and the name stuck.

A regular in Planet Comics and Rangers Comics in the late 1940s, Ingels worked for Magazine Enterprises and other publishers of comic books and pulps. He became an art director at Better Publications (Ned Pine's Comics Group later known as Nedor), where he gave early comic book assignments to George Evans, with whom he would form a long friendship, and a young Frank Frazetta, who credited Ingels as the first in the business to recognize his talent. During this period, Ingels created covers and stories for the company's Startling Comics and Wonder Comics; these and other Better Publications comics reveal certain panels by other artists have been redrawn by Ingels to improve the artwork.

Ingels drew crime comics for Magazine Enterprises (Manhunt, Killers) and Westerns for a variety of companies, including Magazine Enterprises (Guns), Youthful Magazines (Gunsmoke), Hillman Periodicals (Western Fighters) and D.S. Publishing Co. (Outlaws). D.S. also published crime stories drawn by Ingels in Underworld, Gangsters Can't Win and Exposed. There were also short stories and one painted cover by Ingels in Dell Comics' Heroic Comics around 1947.

== EC Comics ==
Ingels's horror host, the Old Witch

In 1948, Ingels was hired by Al Feldstein, the editor of EC Comics, to provide artwork for their titles which included Gunfighter, Saddle Justice, Saddle Romances, War Against Crime, Modern Love and A Moon, A Girl... Romance. The company's Western and romance comics were later canceled or converted to horror and science-fiction titles. In Grant Geissman's Foul Play, Feldstein explained that Ingels' early work for EC was disappointing, but publisher Bill Gaines was fiercely loyal to everybody, which is why Ingels remained at the company. When EC introduced Tales From the Crypt, The Vault of Horror and The Haunt of Fear, it soon became apparent to both Gaines and Feldstein that Ingels was an ideal choice as an illustrator of horror.

Ingels' unique and expressive style was well-suited for the atmospheric depiction of Gothic horrors amid crumbling Victorian mansions in hellish landscapes populated by twisted characters, grotesque creatures and living corpses with rotting flesh. A trademark image was a character with a thread of saliva visible in a horrified open mouth.

As the lead artist for The Haunt of Fear, he brought to life the Old Witch, horror host of "The Witch's Cauldron" lead story, and he also did the cover for each issue from issue 11 through 28. A prolific artist, Ingels also drew the Old Witch's appearances in Tales From the Crypt and The Vault of Horror, plus stories for Shock SuspenStories and Crime SuspenStories. The Old Witch's origin story was told in "A Little Stranger" (The Haunt of Fear #14).

"Poetic Justice" in the 12th issue was adapted for the 1972 Tales From the Crypt film from Amicus studios in England, with Peter Cushing as the kindly old junk collector, and Ingels' "Wish You Were Here" (The Haunt of Fear #22) was also adapted.

When EC cancelled its horror and crime comics, Ingels drew for EC's New Direction titles: Piracy, M.D., Impact and Valor. He later contributed to EC's short lived Picto-Fiction line.

After EC ceased publication in the mid-1950s, Ingels contributed to Classics Illustrated but otherwise found little work, as discussed by Nostrand in Foul Play: "He was kind of a sad case, because when the horror stuff went out, Graham went out with it. His forte was strictly doing horror comics, and there weren't any more horror comics being done".

Ingels took a teaching position with the Famous Artists correspondence school in Westport, Connecticut. He later left the Northeast and became an art instructor in Lantana, Florida, refusing to acknowledge his work in horror comics until a few years before he died. Journalist Donald Vaughan documented Ingels' life in Florida:

His relationship with Gertrude became increasingly strained, possibly due to his heavy drinking, and apparently Ingels simply couldn't bear the life he was living. So in 1962, he quietly packed up and moved to Lantana, where he painted and taught fine art from his tiny home. Oddly, he never officially divorced Gertrude, probably because both were devout Catholics. Relations between Ingels and his children were painfully strained for decades, but he finally reconciled with Deanna in the mid-'80s with the help of George Evans, who had stayed in touch with the Ingels family. However, Ingels never reconciled with his son, Robby, who couldn't forgive his father for running out. It was a situation that hurt Ingels to the very end. In Florida, Ingels became extremely reclusive and went to great lengths to avoid any association with his comic-book past. Evans recalls an incident in which a couple of comic-book fans found out where Ingels was living and flew to Florida to meet him. "He refused to talk to them," says Evans, "and he told William Gaines to put out the word that if anyone bothered him that way again he would take legal action to stop it."... There's no question, however, that Ingels' life changed dramatically once he settled in South Florida, thanks in great part to a girlfriend named Dorothy Bennett. An artistic soul in her own right, Bennett handled the day-to-day aspects of Ingels' teaching business, cherished his artistic talent and encouraged his various endeavors. The couple lived next door to each other for years and finally moved in together.

== Awards and tributes ==
The Haunt of Fear, illustrated by Ingels

"Horror We? How's Bayou?" in The Haunt of Fear issue #17 won an award as best EC horror art at the 1972 EC Fan-Addict Convention. In 2004, the webcomic Is This Tomorrow? featured Ingels in its series of comic book trading cards.

Started in 2011, the Ghastly Awards adopted their name from Ingels's nom-de-plume. The award, which honors excellence in horror comics, is presented annually. Ghastly Graham Ingels was the first Hall of Fame inductee.

In 2024, Ingels was posthumously awarded the Inkwell Awards Stacey Aragon Special Recognition Award (SASRA).
