= Jack Kamen =

American illustrator (1920-2008)

Jack Kamen

Jack Kamen (/ˈkeɪmən/; May 29, 1920 – August 5, 2008) was an American illustrator for books, magazines, comic books and advertising, known for his work illustrating crime, horror, humor, suspense and science fiction stories for EC Comics, for his work in advertising, and for the onscreen artwork he contributed to the 1982 horror anthology film Creepshow.

== Early life ==
Jack Kamen was born to a Jewish family in Brooklyn, New York City, on May 29, 1920. Attended Thomas Jefferson High School (Brooklyn)

== Career ==
Kamen's first professional job was as an assistant to a sculptor working for the Texas Centennial. He studied sculpture with Agop Agopoff and was a student of Harvey Dunn, George Brandt Bridgman and William C. McNulty. When Kamen attended classes at the Art Students League and the Grand Central Art School, he paid for his studies by painting theatrical scenery, decorating fashion mannequins and creating sculptures. Shortly after he began his illustration career with Western and detective pulp magazines, he was called into the Army in 1942. After World War II, he started drawing comic book stories for Fiction House and the Eisner & Iger studio.

== EC Comics ==
Artist Al Feldstein also did work for the Eisner & Iger studio, where Kamen and Feldstein became friends. Later, Feldstein brought Kamen into EC Comics, as Kamen recalled in an interview with Ken Smith:

He called me up, and I went in and met both of them. Al was there. Bill said, 'This boy wonder of mine is recommending you for this work.' I was delighted, because Bill Gaines was always Bill Gaines, and Al was my friend. So I got the work. I was glad to get it. And then, as the popularity increased, Bill one day said, "Look, I don't know what you're getting, but I'll meet anybody's price and I'll keep you busy all of the time. How would you like to be exclusive?" And I said I'd love it!

Jack Kamen's "Kamen's Kalamity" from Tales from the Crypt #31 (August–September 1952) showed Kamen getting an assignment from the publisher Bill Gaines and editor Al Feldstein.

After initially getting EC assignments to illustrate romance comics, he soon became one of the most prolific EC artists, drawing crime, horror, humor, suspense and science fiction stories. He was known for his drawings of attractive women. Describing Kamen's understated style, EC editor Al Feldstein said, "We gave Kamen those stories where the All-American girl and guy are married and then chop each other to pieces." In Tales from the Crypt #31, Kamen drew a semi-autobiographical self-satire, "Kamen's Kalamity", later adapted to HBO's Tales from the Crypt TV series as "Korman's Kalamity". The story depicted the transition from romance to horror by Kamen, who called it "my favourite story".

After EC's line of comics fell victim to industry censorship in 1954–55, it was Kamen who suggested to the publisher that the company could avoid the newly imposed Comics Code Authority strictures with a pricier magazine format, which Kamen dubbed Picto-Fiction. However, EC's woes followed the new line of Picto-Fiction titles, including those with stories by Kamen. The magazines were underdistributed and soon canceled.

== Advertising art ==
After leaving EC, Kamen began drawing Sunday supplement illustrations and creating advertising art for a wide variety of clients: Esquire Shoe Polish, Mack Trucks, Pan American Airlines, Playtex, RCA, Smith Corona and Sylvania. For artist Tom Palmer, Kamen described one of his unusual painting techniques:

Did you know I used Prismacolor pencils along with an acrylic paint wash to create my paintings? I would use a smooth illustration board and apply my basic color in a very watery wash of acrylic, and after it dried I would start rendering with Prismacolor pencil. Then I would take an electric eraser, with a particular eraser, that when you erased anything before you got down to removing color, you could mix the colour pencil very, very smooth, almost like an oil painting. For instance, I would mix a puddle of acrylic paint flesh color and put that down as a watercolor wash. As soon as it dried, I would add all the details in colored pencil. In areas that needed correction, I would paint opaque white acrylic and then go back and do colored pencils again. The electric eraser blended all the pencils into a smooth look. If you look at a painting of Santa Claus, the beard is opaque white acrylic, put down as a watercolor wash, then the shading and gray tones were added in color pencil, the electric eraser gave the fuzzy look to all that.

He also drew all the comic book artwork for Stephen King and George A. Romero's 1982 horror anthology film Creepshow, King and Romero's homage to the EC horror comics. Although the bulk of the artwork for the graphic novel adaptation of the film was done by acclaimed macabre artist Berni Wrightson (along with his daughter who did some of the coloring), Kamen illustrated the cover.

== Personal life ==
Jack Kamen married Evelyn Rothenberg, in 1946. They had four children.

His eldest son, Barton, was a director of pediatric hematology/oncology at the Cancer Institute of New Jersey, a professor of pediatrics and pharmacology at UMDNJ-Robert Wood Johnson Medical School, and the chief medical officer of the Leukemia & Lymphoma Society. Bart died on September 27, 2012. Bart's daughter Libby is Jack and Evelyn's only grandchild.

His son Dean Kamen is the inventor of the Segway and the iBOT Mobility System, and Jack Kamen drew the patent renderings of the Segway. He also designed the logo for Dean Kamen's FIRST program.

Mitch and Terri are twins and the youngest of the four children. Mitch is a musician in New York and his only daughter Terri is the owner and general manager of an insurance agency in Palm Beach County, Florida.

Kamen died at his home in Boca Raton on August 5, 2008 at the age of 88, from complications of cancer.
