= Tales from the Crypt (film) =

1972 British film by Freddie Francis

- Theatrical release poster
- Directed by: Freddie Francis
- Screenplay by: Milton Subotsky
- Based on: Stories from Tales from the Crypt, The Vault of Horror, and The Haunt of Fear by Al Feldstein; Johnny Craig; Bill Gaines
- Produced by: Milton Subotsky; Max Rosenberg
- Starring: Joan Collins; Peter Cushing; Roy Dotrice; Richard Greene; Ian Hendry; Patrick Magee; Barbara Murray; Nigel Patrick; Robin Phillips; Ralph Richardson
- Cinematography: Norman Warwick
- Edited by: Teddy Darvas
- Music by: Douglas Gamley
- Production companies: Amicus Productions; Metromedia Producers Corporation
- Distributed by: Cinerama Releasing Corporation
- Release dates: 8 March 1972 (United States); 28 September 1972 (United Kingdom)
- Running time: 92 minutes
- Countries: United Kingdom; United States
- Language: English
- Budget: £170,000
- Box office: >$3 million (United States)

Tales from the Crypt is a 1972 horror anthology film directed by Freddie Francis, and starring Joan Collins, Ian Hendry, Robin Phillips, Richard Greene, Nigel Patrick, and Ralph Richardson. It consists of five separate segments and a wraparound, based on short stories from the American EC Comics series Tales from the Crypt, The Vault of Horror, and The Haunt of Fear. In the film, five strangers in a crypt encounter the mysterious Crypt Keeper, who makes each person in turn foresee the manner of their death.

A co-production between the United Kingdom's Amicus Productions and the United States's Metromedia Producers Corporation, Tales from the Crypt was one of several horror anthologies produced from the former during the 1970s. It was released by Cinerama Releasing Corporation in the United States on 8 March 1972. Another EC Comics-based anthology, The Vault of Horror, followed in 1973.

== Plot ==
Intro (wraparound)

Five strangers are viewing old catacombs in the English countryside. Their names are Joanne Clayton, Carl Maitland, James Elliot, Ralph Jason, and Major William Rogers. They stumble into a room with a mysterious Crypt Keeper, who details how each of them will die.

...And All Through the House

- Adapted from The Vault of Horror #35 (February–March 1954).

The beautiful and glamorous Joanne Clayton, aged in her late 30s, kills her much older husband Richard on Christmas Eve to collect his life insurance. She prepares to hide his body, but is interrupted by a radio announcement of a homicidal maniac lurking in the night. She sees the killer (who is dressed in a Santa Claus costume) outside her home, but cannot call the police without exposing her own crime. She locks the doors and windows, before dragging her husband's body and hurling it down into the basement.

After cleaning up the murder scene, Joanne attempts to phone the police with the intention of making them believe the maniac killed her husband. However, her young daughter Carol — believing the maniac to be Santa — unlocks the door and lets him into the house, whereupon he strangles Joanne to death.

Reflection of Death

- Adapted from Tales from the Crypt #23 (April–May 1951).

Carl Maitland abandons his wife and children to be with his secretary, Susan Blake. After they drive off together, they are involved in a car crash. He wakes up, having been thrown clear of the wrecked and burned car, and attempts to hitchhike home, but everyone he meets reacts with horror upon seeing him.

Arriving at his house, Carl sees his wife with another man. He knocks on the door, but she screams and slams the door. He then goes to see Susan, only to find that she is blind from the accident. She says that Carl died two years ago in the crash. Glancing at a reflective tabletop, he sees he has the face of a rotting corpse and screams in horror. Carl then wakes up and finds out that it was a dream, but the moment he does, the crash occurs as previously seen.

Poetic Justice

- Adapted from The Haunt of Fear #12 (March–April 1952).

James Elliot lives with his father Edward across from the home of elderly dustman Arthur Edward Grimsdyke, who owns a number of dogs and entertains children in his house with stories and toys. While both the Elliots are snobs who resent Grimsdyke as a blight on their neighbourhood, James strongly detests the old man enough to conduct a smear campaign against him: first having his beloved dogs taken by animal control (although one of them returns to him), then persuading a member of the council to have him removed from his job, and later exploiting parents' paranoid fears about child molestation. Unbeknownst to James, Grimsdyke dabbles in the occult and holds a seance by himself to confer with his late wife.

On Valentine's Day, James sends Grimsdyke a number of poison-pen valentines, supposedly from the neighbours, driving the old man to suicide. Exactly one year later, on Valentine's Day, Grimsdyke rises from the grave and takes revenge on James. The next morning, Edward finds his son, bloodied and dead, with a note that reads, "HAPPY VALENTINE'S DAY..YOU WERE MEAN AND CRUEL..RIGHT FROM THE START..NOW YOU REALLY HAVE NO.." The final word is revealed by James' still-beating heart inside the folded end of the paper, horrifying Edward.

Wish You Were Here

- Adapted from The Haunt of Fear #22 (November–December 1953). A variation on W. W. Jacobs's short story "The Monkey's Paw".

Ineffective, ruthless businessman Ralph Jason is close to financial ruin. His wife Enid notices, for the first time, the inscription on a Chinese figurine in the couple's collection, which grants three wishes to the owner. Enid decides to wish for a fortune and, surprisingly, the wish comes true, but Ralph is killed, seemingly in a car crash, on the way to his lawyer's office to collect the money. The lawyer, Charles Gregory, then advises Enid she will inherit a fortune from her deceased husband's life insurance plan; however, when he learns of the manner of the wish granted that she made, he warns her not to wish Ralph back since he remembered the consequences of a similar story in which a mother wished her dead son back, only to be horrified by his gruesome appearance and forced to use the last wish to send him back to the grave. Against Gregory's explicit advice, Enid uses her second wish to bring him back to the way he was just before the accident, but he is returned in his coffin, still dead, as his death was due to a heart attack immediately before the crash and caused by fright upon seeing the figure of "death" following him on a motorcycle.

Once more, Gregory warns Enid not to make a final wish and just let Ralph rest in peace. As Gregory goes outside to get some fresh air, she uses her final wish to bring Ralph back to life and to live forever. When Gregory comes back inside, he discovers too late that Enid again went against his warning. Gregory points out to her that Ralph was embalmed and he is suffering from the effects of the embalming liquid. Enid tries to kill Ralph to end his pain but, because she wished for him to live forever, he cannot be killed. As a result, she has now trapped him in eternal agony and thus making her regret those last two wishes.

Blind Alleys

- Adapted from Tales from the Crypt #46 (February–March 1955).

Major William Rogers becomes the new director of a home for the blind, and exploits his position to live in luxury with his German Shepherd Shane, while his drastic financial cuts to food and heating reduce the residents' quality of life. Rogers gets his comeuppance after he ignores the pleas of resident George Carter to both make the living conditions more bearable and later to get medical treatment for fellow resident Greenwood, who then dies from hypothermia. Carter, with the aid of his fellow blind residents and Harry the cook, leads a revolt to subdue the staff before locking Rogers and Shane in separate rooms in the basement; and they then construct a small maze of narrow corridors between the two rooms. After going over two days without food, Rogers is released and forced to find his way through the maze for his freedom, getting past one corridor lined with razor blades once Carter turns the lights on; but Rogers finds his last obstacle to be a ravenous Shane who does not seem to recognise him. He flees back towards the razors, only for Carter to turn the lights off. Rogers is heard screaming as the hungry dog catches up with him and kills him.

Finale (wraparound)

After completing the final tale, the Crypt Keeper reveals that he was not warning them of what would happen, but instead telling them what has already happened: that they have all "died without repentance". There is one clue to this twist in that Joanne is wearing the brooch her husband had given her for Christmas just before she killed him. The door to Hell opens and Joanne, Carl, James, Ralph, and Major Rogers all enter.

"And now, who's next?" asks the Crypt Keeper, turning to face the camera as he says "Perhaps... YOU?" The scene pulls away and the credits roll as the entrance to the Crypt Keeper's lair is in flames.

== Cast ==
Wraparounds:

- Ralph Richardson as The Crypt Keeper
- Geoffrey Bayldon as The Guide

"And All Through the House":

- Joan Collins as Joanne Clayton
- Martin Boddey as Richard Clayton
- Chloe Franks as Carol Clayton
- Oliver MacGreevy as homicidal maniac
- Robert Rietti as radio announcer (voice, uncredited)

"Reflection of Death":

- Ian Hendry as Carl Maitland
- Susan Denny as Mrs. Maitland
- Angela Grant as Susan Blake
- Peter Fraser as motorist
- Frank Forsyth as tramp

"Poetic Justice":

- Peter Cushing as Arthur Edward Grimsdyke
- Robin Phillips as James Elliot
- David Markham as Edward Elliot
- Robert Hutton as Mr. Baker
- Manning Wilson as Vicar
- Clifford Earl as Police Sergeant
- Edward Evans as Constable Ramsey
- Irene Gawne as Mrs. Phelps
- Stafford Medhurst as Mrs. Phelps' son

"Wish You Were Here":

- Richard Greene as Ralph Jason
- Barbara Murray as Enid Jason
- Roy Dotrice as Charles Gregory
- Jane Sofiano as secretary
- Peter Thomas as pallbearer
- Hedger Wallace as detective

"Blind Alleys":

- Nigel Patrick as Major William Rogers
- Patrick Magee as George Carter
- George Herbert as Greenwood
- Harry Locke as Harry
- Tony Wall as attendant
- John Barrard as blind man (uncredited)

== Production ==
=== Development ===
Milton Subotsky of Amicus Productions had long been a fan of EC Comics' Tales from the Crypt and eventually persuaded his partner Max Rosenberg to buy the rights. The copyright owner, William Gaines, insisted on script approval. The budget of £170,000 was higher than usual for an Amicus production, and was partly funded by American International Pictures. The film marked the first production by American studio Metromedia Producers Corporation.

Only two of the stories are from EC's Tales from the Crypt comic book. The reason for this, according to Creepy founding editor Russ Jones, is that producer Milton Subotsky did not own a run of the original EC comic book but instead adapted the movie from the two paperback reprints given to him by Jones. The story "Wish You Were Here" was reprinted in the paperback collection The Vault of Horror (Ballantine, 1965). The other four stories in the movie were among the eight stories reprinted in Tales from the Crypt (Ballantine, 1964).

Sir Ralph Richardson's hooded Crypt Keeper, more sombre than the EC original (as illustrated by Al Feldstein and Jack Davis), has a monk-like appearance with his hood up. In the EC horror comics, the other horror hosts (the Old Witch and the Vault Keeper) wore hoods, while the Crypt Keeper did not. The earlier Amicus anthology film Torture Garden features a similar ending breaking the fourth wall.

The screenplay was adapted into a tie-in novel by Jack Oleck, Tales from the Crypt (Bantam, 1972). Oleck, who wrote the novel Messalina (1950), also scripted for EC's Picto-Fiction titles, Crime Illustrated, Shock Illustrated and Terror Illustrated. A tie-in novel was also written by Oleck for the later Amicus anthology film The Vault Of Horror, released in 1973.

=== Casting ===
Peter Cushing was originally offered the part of Ralph Jason but wanted to try something different and played the elderly Arthur Edward Grimsdyke instead, while Richard Greene was cast as Ralph.

=== Filming ===
Principal photography began on 13 September 1971 and finished in 1972, with filming taking place at Shepperton Studios and at various locations around Surrey and Middlesex. The opening credits sequence was filmed at Highgate Cemetery.

== Release ==
The film premiered in North America on 8 March 1972, and in the United Kingdom on 28 September 1972.

=== Home media ===
The film was released on VHS in North America by Prism Entertainment Corp in 1985, then by Starmaker Home Video in 1989, and finally by 20th Century Fox Home Entertainment, under their Selections label, in 1998. In the UK, it was released on VHS in 1988 by CBS Fox Video, having been rated 18 without cuts by the BBFC.

The film was released on DVD in the United Kingdom on 28 June 2010. It received its first Blu-ray release from Shock Records distribution in Australia on 2 November 2011. The film, paired with another Amicus anthology, The Vault of Horror, was released on a double-feature DVD on 11 September 2007. Shout! Factory released the same double feature on Blu-ray on 2 December 2014.

== Reception ==
=== Box office ===
The film earned over $3 million in box office receipts at the United States box office.

=== Critical response ===
Roger Ebert of the Chicago Sun-Times gave the film three out of four stars, saying, "It's put together something like the comic books, with the old Crypt Keeper acting as host and narrator. In the movie version, he is played with suitable ham by Ralph Richardson".

Vincent Canby of The New York Times felt the film lacked style and was too heavy-handed in its morality.

The Radio Times Guide to Films gave the film 4/5 stars, writing: "This excellent anthology of scares-with-a-smile stories drawn from EC horror comics has Ralph Richardson as the crypt keeper revealing a quintet of fearsome futures to a veteran British cast of terror troupers. ... Ace direction by genre favourite Freddie Francis adeptly leavens the horror with serio-comic interludes."

In retrospective reviews, Craig Butler of AllMovie said, "It has a certain magnetism about it that is hard to resist and which accounts for its enduring popularity. There's something about Crypt that makes even jaded viewers feel like they're kids sitting in their rooms late at night with the lights out, telling eerie tales with the aid of a flashlight."

Eric Henderson of Slant Magazine rated it two-and-a-half out of five stars and wrote that "the undercurrent of sternness is tempered by a truly bottomless roster of campy excess".

Anthony Arrigo of Dread Central wrote, "The greatest strength in Tales comes not from the acting or directing – both of which are perfectly sound – but in the rich stories culled from the comics."

Chris Alexander of Fangoria wrote, "[F]rom its first frames to its invasive final shot, this classic British creeper offers an unrelenting study in the art of the macabre."

As of November 2026, Rotten Tomatoes, a review aggregator, reported that 89% of 19 surveyed critics gave the film a positive review, with an average score of 6.90/10.

== Sources ==
- Bloom, Clive, ed. (2021). The Palgrave Handbook of Steam Age Gothic. London, England: Palgrave Macmillan. ISBN 978-3-030-40866-4.
- Bryce, Allan, ed. (2000). Amicus: The Studio That Dripped Blood. Plymouth, England: Stray Cat Publishing. ISBN 978-0-953-32613-6.
- Wada-Marciano, Mitsuyo (2012). Japanese Cinema in the Digital Age. Honolulu, Hawaii: University of Hawaiʻi Press. ISBN 978-0-824-86588-7.
