= Jack Oleck =

American novelist and comic book writer (1914–1981)

- Born: March 1, 1914
- Died: March 10, 1981 (aged 67) Massapequa Park, New York
- Area: Writer
- Notable works: Messalina, DC Comics horror titles

Jack Oleck (March 1, 1914 – March 10, 1981) was an American novelist and comic book writer particularly known for his work in the horror genre.

The brother-in-law of comics pioneer Joe Simon, Oleck's comic book career was basically in two parts. During the Golden Age of comics Oleck wrote for EC Comics and the Simon-Jack Kirby Studio. After the mid-1950s temporary collapse of the industry following the publication of Fredric Wertham's Seduction of the Innocent and the establishment of the Comics Code Authority, Oleck left comics, instead writing novels and publishing an interior design magazine. From the late 1960s until his death in 1981, Oleck worked for DC Comics as a writer for their extensive line of horror/suspense titles.

== Biography ==
=== Early career ===
Oleck's first comics credit was as a writer for Lev Gleason Publications' Silver Streak, in 1940. He served in the U.S. Army during World War II, leaving the service as a sergeant.

=== Golden Age ===
In 1948, using his connection as Simon's brother-in-law, Oleck joined the Simon & Kirby studio, which produced material for such publishers as Quality Comics, Hillman Periodicals, and Simon & Kirby's own Mainline Publications. Oleck quickly established himself as "the number one scriptwriter for Simon and Kirby," producing romance stories, war stories and crime features, in addition to the burgeoning field of horror comics.

EC Comics editor Al Feldstein recruited Oleck in the early 1950s, where he became one of the main writers of Crime SuspenStories. Oleck also scripted stories for EC's The Vault of Horror and Weird Science-Fantasy, as well as the EC Picto-Fiction titles, Crime Illustrated, Shock Illustrated and Terror Illustrated.

=== Novelist and magazine publisher ===
After temporarily leaving comics, Oleck was the publisher and editor of Interior Decorator News from 1957 to 1969. During this period, Oleck wrote a popular pulp fiction historical novel, Messalina, about the Roman empress, which has been republished many times. He penned a second historical novel, Theodora, reflecting his fascination with and great knowledge about the Roman Empire. Oleck followed with a few more, lesser known books as well as at least one television script.

=== DC Comics ===
Horror comics made a comeback in the late 1960s and Oleck joined DC Comics' stable of writers in 1968. His first story for DC, "The House of Gargoyles", was published in House of Mystery #175 (July–August 1968).

He became a regular contributor to such titles as Forbidden Tales of Dark Mansion, House of Mystery, House of Secrets, Secrets of Sinister House, Tales of Ghost Castle, Weird Mystery Tales, and Weird War Tales. He also returned to the romance field, scripting stories for DC's Young Love and Young Romance, both titles Oleck had written for in the 1950s which had subsequently been acquired by DC.

For House of Mystery #194 (Sept. 1971), Oleck wrote the seven-page story "The King Is Dead", which was illustrated by Nestor Redondo in his earliest U.S. credit. Conversely, Oleck wrote the final story Golden Age artist Bernard Baily drew, the eight-page "His Brother's Keeper", for House of Mystery #279 (April 1980).

Oleck and artist Alex Niño created the science-fiction feature "Space Voyagers" in Rima, the Jungle Girl #1 (May 1974). Oleck and Alfredo Alcala created the short-lived series Kong the Untamed in 1975. Oleck's final story for DC was "Legend of the Lost" in House of Mystery #287 (Dec. 1980) which was drawn by Alex Saviuk and Bob Layton.

In the 1970s, Oleck wrote horror paperback novels, including two film tie-ins.

== Bibliography ==
=== Comic books ===
==== Charlton Comics ====
- Ghost Manor #62 (1982)
- Haunted #71 (1984)
- Out of This World #3–4 (1957)
- Strange Suspense Stories #32 (1957)

==== DC Comics ====
- The Amazing World of DC Comics #12 (1976)
- Dark Mansion of Forbidden Love #3 (1972)
- DC Special #11 (1971)
- DC Special Series #12 (1978)
- Falling in Love #137 (1972)
- Forbidden Tales of Dark Mansion #5, 8–10 (1972–1973)
- Girls' Love Stories #149, 153, 156–157, 159, 177 (1970–1973)
- House of Mystery #175, 182–184, 186, 189, 191, 194–198, 200, 204, 206, 210–214, 222–223, 225–226, 230–232, 234, 236–239, 241–242, 246–248, 250–258, 265, 278–279, 287 (1968–1980)
- House of Secrets #95–96, 99–102, 104, 106–107, 110, 113, 116–118, 121–122, 124–126, 129–133, 136, 138–139, 141–143, 147–149, 152–153 (1971–1978)
- Kong the Untamed #1–3 (1975)
- Phantom Stranger vol. 2 #12 (1971)
- Plop! #2, 7, 9 (1973–1975)
- Rima, the Jungle Girl #1 (1974)
- Secret Hearts #148, 152 (1970–1971)
- Secrets of Haunted House #1–4, 6, 9–10, 13 (1975–1978)
- Secrets of Sinister House #9, 12–13, 15 (1973)
- Star Spangled War Stories #190, 192, 195, 203 (1975–1976)
- Tales of Ghost Castle #2–3 (1975)
- The Unexpected #118, 161, 189, 191–194 (1970–1979)
- Unknown Soldier #218 (1978)
- Weird Mystery Tales #4–5, 8–13, 21, 24 (1973–1975)
- Weird War Tales #13, 15–16, 20–22, 24, 26–27, 29–30, 32–33, 35–36, 38–40, 42–47, 49, 51–54, 58–59, 63, 65, 69–71 (1973–1979)
- Weird Western Tales #15 (1972)
- The Witching Hour #11 (1970)
- Young Love #85, 88–90 (1971)
- Young Romance #165–166 (1970)

==== EC Comics ====
- Aces High #3–5 (1955)
- Crime Illustrated #1–2 (1955–1956)
- Crime SuspenStories #24–27 (1954–1955)
- The Haunt of Fear #27 (1954)
- Impact #4 (1955)
- Incredible Science Fiction #30–33 (1955–1956)
- Piracy #5 (1955)
- Shock Illustrated #2–3 (1956)
- Shock SuspenStories #14–15 (1954)
- Terror Illustrated #1–2 (1955–1956)
- The Vault of Horror #35–37 (1954)

==== Harvey Comics ====
- Alarming Tales #2–4 (1957–1958)
- Black Cat #62 (1958)

==== Hillman Periodicals ====
- Pirates Comics #1–4 (1950)

==== Mainline Publications ====
- Foxhole #3–4 (1955)

==== Marvel Comics ====
- Astonishing #55 (1956)
- Journey into Mystery #11 (1953)
- Strange Tales #49 (1956)

==== Prize Publications ====
- Black Magic #35 (1957)
- Strange World of Your Dreams #4 (1953)
- Young Romance #4 (1948)

=== Novels ===
- Messalina (Lyle Stuart, 1959)
- Theodora (Signet, 1971), historical novel similar in spirit to Messalina
- The Villagers (Lyle Stuart, 1971)
- Tales from the Crypt (Bantam Books, 1972), film tie-in
- The Vault of Horror (Bantam Books, 1973), film tie-in
- Tales From the House of Mystery #1 ISBN 978-0446752268 and #2 ISBN 978-0446752565 (Warner Paperback, 1973), illustrated by Bernie Wrightson
- Satan's Child (1978), illustrated by Arthur Suydam
- The Rites of Spring (1982), illustrated by Arthur Suydam
