= EC Archives =

American comic book reprints

Example of EC Archives' digital coloring by Jamison Services on a Johnny Craig page: "Terror on the Moors!" in EC Archives: The Vault of Horror (2007), originally in The Vault of Horror #17 (February–March 1951)

The EC Archives are an ongoing series of American hardcover collections of full-color comic book reprints of EC Comics, published by Russ Cochran and Gemstone Publishing from 2006 to 2008, and then continued by Cochran and Grant Geissman's GC imprint (2011–2012), and finally taken over by Dark Horse in 2013.

The output of Bill Gaines' EC Comics line in the 1940s and 1950s is one of the most critically acclaimed of the pre-Comics Code comics publishers (and one of the major casualties of the Comics Code). Such EC Comics titles as Tales from the Crypt, The Vault of Horror and Weird Science are known even to people unfamiliar with the source material, due to movie and television adaptations.

Numerous reprints throughout the decades have also kept EC alive on book store shelves, starting with Nostalgia Press's EC Horror Comics Of The 1950s tome (1971), followed by publisher Cochran's six EC Portfolios (1971–1977), but primarily because of his Complete EC Library, printing all of the 'New Trend' comic titles (although missing the unique stories from the three 3-D EC Classics issues), as well as all of the 'New Direction' and 'Picto-Fiction' titles, and some of the 'Pre-Trend' title issues, in a series of 18 b&w box sets (19 if you include the fact that the Mad set was done in both color and b&w editions) containing a total of 66 hardcover books, all shot directly from the original art, mostly published from 1979 to 1996, with the Picto-Fiction box being delayed until 2006. Between 1992 and 2000, Cochran and Gemstone Publishing also produced 295 different full-color individual issue reproductions of all the "New Trend' (except Mad) and 'New Direction' EC Comics, and subsequently 63 EC Annuals which glued together titled chronological overstock copies of those individual issues in a new outer wrapper, in a nod to the original unsold-stock content of the EC Annuals of the 50s, although back in the 1950s there was no specification as to what issues may have been contained inside the covers to those various Annuals, which could vary from copy to copy.

== Digital recoloring ==
In 2006, Gemstone began producing a more durable series of hardback reprint collections designed by Michael Kronenberg. Similar to the DC Archives and Marvel Masterworks series, the EC Archives superseded Cochran's original annotated Complete EC Library (of black-and-white stories) by reprinting sequential compilations of EC titles in a full-color, hardback archival format with new annotations. On January 11, 2011, Cochran looked back on the project, noting the differences between his earlier Complete EC Library and the later EC Archives:

A few years ago, with the support and encouragement of Steve Geppi and with the permission of the Gaines Estate, I started on a new format: the EC Archives. These are slightly smaller hardcover books (smaller than the EC Library volumes but larger than the original ten-cent comic books), and because of increased demand and the availability of cheaper color printing in China, the EC Archives books were full color, with new color in an infinite palette now being possible with the advances in technology.

Each book reprints six issues, for a total of 24 stories. The original coloring by EC's colorist Marie Severin was used as a guide for digital re-coloring by Jamison Services, a color separation company in West Plains, Missouri, the hometown of publisher Cochran. Allen Jamison and Jamison Services had previously done coloring for the DC Archives. Also contributing to the project at Cochran's West Plains office were operations manager Angela Meyer and production artist Chris Rock. Crediting Kronenberg as "Art Director/Designer and Color Editor" and Marie Severin for "Colors", Cochran explained the digital upgrade given to Severin's coloring; "Most of the original coloring of these stories is the work of EC colorist Marie Severin, and although all of these stories have been re-colored for this new edition, her style of coloring was followed to retain the integrity of the original EC comic books". He later added:

Technology changes. We are now able to color these comics with an infinite palette, and to reproduce the artists' linework much more clearly. If these new computer generated color techniques had been available in the 1950s, I think Bill Gaines would have used it because it makes the EC work even more beautiful. So the EC material has been printed three different ways: with the old color, as originally published back in the 1950s, without any color, as it was drawn by the EC artists (the EC Library), and with the best color we can do with modern technology (the EC Archives). It has been my experience that the most dedicated EC fans are not satisfied to have them reprinted only one, or two, ways. They want them all. Those fans will have the old comics in the EC Annuals, the black and white art in the EC Library, and the best color we can produce in the EC Archives. There's room there for everyone.

Along with the original EC advertisements, editorials and letters pages, the books also feature an introduction by Grant Geissman and forewords by John Carpenter, Joe Dante, Paul Levitz, George Lucas, Steven Spielberg, R. L. Stine, Jerry Weist and others. The entirety of the New Trend and New Direction comics are planned for eventual release.

The EC Archives publishing history has been a troubled one. The original run was interrupted after 13 volumes, due to financial difficulties at Gemstone Publishing, in 2008. The line was revived for two more volumes by GC Press LLC, a boutique imprint established by Russ Cochran and Grant Geissman, in 2011 (both volumes carry 2011 copyrights, the year of their printing, though due to the vagaries of distribution, they were not released until January 2012). Most recently, the line has been taken up by Dark Horse Comics, who announced plans to resume it with the release of Tales from the Crypt Volume 4 in October 2013.

== EC Archives schedule ==
=== Issue numbering ===
In the early 1950s, comic book publishers, seeking to save money on second-class postage permits, frequently changed the titles of their comics, rather than start new ones at #1 (a new publication required a new postal permit, while an existing publication that just changed its name could use its existing permit). Because of this, many comics featured in The EC Archives series do not start with #1. War Against Crime was replaced by The Vault of Horror and so numbering for The Vault of Horror begins with issue #13. Similarly, Crime Patrol was replaced with The Crypt of Terror for issue #17. By issue #20, the title changed again to the familiar Tales from the Crypt. The Crypt of Terror is not considered a separate series and is included in Tales from the Crypt Volume 1.

The Haunt of Fear, Weird Science, and Weird Fantasy initially started with issues #15, #12, and #13, respectively. However, due to a request from the Post Office, their issue numbering was reset a few issues later. This reset began with The Haunt of Fear #4, Weird Science #5, and Weird Fantasy #6. As a result, there are several comics within those series that share the same issue number. For instance, The Haunt of Fear #15 was first published in 1950 as the inaugural issue of the series, while a second comic, also titled The Haunt of Fear #15, was published in 1952 and marked the 15th issue in the series according to the reset numbering.

Following The Haunt of Fear's issue numbering being reset, its previous numbering was instead used for a new title, Two-Fisted Tales. Thus, Two-Fisted Tales begins with issue #18.

The table below uses the original numbering.

=== EC Archives books ===
Title	Volume	Reprints	Foreword	First printing	Publisher	Pages	ISBN
Aces High	1	Aces High #1 – 5	Howard Chaykin	2017	Dark Horse	168	978-1-5067-0308-4
Choke Gasp! The Best of 75 Years of EC Comics	1	Selections from Various EC Comics	N/A	2019	Dark Horse	528	978-1-5067-1584-1
The Complete Moon Girl	1	Moon Girl #1 – 8	TBA	2025	Dark Horse	368	978-1-5067-5032-3
Confessions Illustrated	1	Confessions Illustrated #1 – 3	Alex Segura	2022	Dark Horse	184	978-1-5067-1975-7
Crime Illustrated	1	Crime Illustrated #1 – 3	William Malone	2022	Dark Horse	192	978-1-5067-1976-4
Crime Patrol	1	Crime Patrol #7 – 11	Brian Michael Bendis	2022	Dark Horse	176	978-1-5067-2984-8
Crime SuspenStories	1	Crime SuspenStories #1 – 6	Max Allan Collins	2008	Gemstone	212	978-1-888472-74-5
Crime SuspenStories	2	Crime SuspenStories #7 – 12	Matt Kindt	2017	Dark Horse	216	978-1-5067-0039-7
Crime SuspenStories	3	Crime SuspenStories #13 – 18	David Del Valle	2017	Dark Horse	216	978-1-5067-0240-7
Crime SuspenStories	4	Crime SuspenStories #19 – 27	Christos Gage	2019	Dark Horse	320	978-1-5067-0924-6
Extra	1	Extra #1 – 5	John Arcudi	2018	Dark Horse	216	978-1-5067-0184-4
Frontline Combat	1	Frontline Combat #1 – 6	John Benson	2008	Gemstone	212	978-1-60360-014-9
Frontline Combat	2	Frontline Combat #7 – 11	Ray Fawkes	2019	Dark Horse	184	978-1-5067-0847-8
Frontline Combat	3	Frontline Combat #12 – 15	Dan Madigan	2021	Dark Horse	152	978-1-5067-1535-3
Gunfighter	1	Gunfighter #5 – 9	Jimmy Palmiotti	2022	Dark Horse	176	978-1-5067-1977-1
The Haunt of Fear	1	The Haunt of Fear #15 – 17; The Haunt of Fear #4 – 6 (with notes by Grant Geissman)	Robert Englund	2012	GC Press	212	978-1-60360-015-6
The Haunt of Fear	2	The Haunt of Fear #7 – 12	Tim Sullivan	2015	Dark Horse	216	978-1-61655-773-7
The Haunt of Fear	3	The Haunt of Fear #13 – 18	Cullen Bunn	2016	Dark Horse	216	978-1-61655-958-8
The Haunt of Fear	4	The Haunt of Fear #19 – 24	Rob Zombie	2017	Dark Horse	216	978-1-5067-0280-3
The Haunt of Fear	5	The Haunt of Fear #25 – 28	Tom Holland	2018	Dark Horse	216	978-1-5067-0650-4
Impact	1	Impact #1 – 5	Steve Ringgenberg	2020	Dark Horse	168	978-1-5067-1192-8
Incredible Science Fiction	1	Weird Science-Fantasy #27 – 29; Incredible Science Fiction #30 – 33	Mark Evanier	2017	Dark Horse	232	978-1-5067-0309-1
M.D.	1	M.D. #1 – 5	Darren Bousman	2021	Dark Horse	168	978-1-5067-0270-4
Modern Love	1	Modern Love #1 – 8	Jacque Nodell	2019	Dark Horse	272	978-1-5067-0848-5
Panic	1	Panic #1 – 6	Bob Fingerman	2016	Dark Horse	216	978-1-61655-883-3
Panic	2	Panic #7 – 12	Sergio Aragones	2017	Dark Horse	200	978-1-5067-0271-1
Piracy	1	Piracy #1 – 7	Greg Nicotero	2019	Dark Horse	240	978-1-5067-0700-6
Psychoanalysis	1	Psychoanalysis #1 – 4	Bob Burden	2020	Dark Horse	136	978-1-5067-1193-5
Saddle Justice	1	Saddle Justice #3 – 8	Eric Red	2021	Dark Horse	208	978-1-5067-1194-2
Shock Illustrated	1	Shock Illustrated #1 – 4	Steve Niles	2021	Dark Horse	248	978-1-5067-1195-9
Shock SuspenStories	1	Shock SuspenStories #1 – 6 (with notes by Russ Cochran)	Steven Spielberg	2006	Gemstone	212	978-1-888472-57-8
Shock SuspenStories	2	Shock SuspenStories #7 – 12	Dean Kamen	2007	Gemstone	212	978-1-888472-70-7
Shock SuspenStories	3	Shock SuspenStories #13 – 18	Brian Michael Bendis	2015	Dark Horse	216	978-1-61655-635-8
Tales from the Crypt	1	The Crypt of Terror #17 – 19; Tales from the Crypt #20 – 22	John Carpenter	2007	Gemstone	212	978-1-888472-55-4
Tales from the Crypt	2	Tales from the Crypt #23 – 28	Joe Dante	2007	Gemstone	212	978-1-888472-71-4
Tales from the Crypt	3	Tales from the Crypt #29 – 34	Robert Overstreet	2008	Gemstone	212	978-1-60360-011-8
Tales from the Crypt	4	Tales from the Crypt #35 – 40	Russ Cochran	2013	Dark Horse	212	978-1-60360-104-7
Tales from the Crypt	5	Tales from the Crypt #41 – 46	Bruce Campbell	2014	Dark Horse	216	978-1-61655-486-6
Terror Illustrated	1	Terror Illustrated #1 – 3	Mick Garris	2022	Dark Horse	184	978-1-5067-1978-8
Two-Fisted Tales	1	Two-Fisted Tales #18 – 23	Steve Geppi	2007	Gemstone	212	978-1-888472-56-1
Two-Fisted Tales	2	Two-Fisted Tales #24 – 29	Professor Rocco Versaci	2007	Gemstone	212	978-1-888472-72-1
Two-Fisted Tales	3	Two-Fisted Tales #30 – 35	Joe Kubert	2014	Dark Horse	216	978-1-60360-017-0
Two-Fisted Tales	4	Two-Fisted Tales #36 – 41	Colleen Coover	2019	Dark Horse	216	978-1-5067-0849-2
Valor	1	Valor #1 – 5	P. Craig Russell	2017	Dark Horse	168	978-1-5067-0159-2
The Vault of Horror	1	The Vault of Horror #12 – 17 (with notes by Roger Hill)	R. L. Stine	2007	Gemstone	212	978-1-888472-73-8
The Vault of Horror	2	The Vault of Horror #18 – 23 (with notes by Bhob Stewart)	John Landis	2012	GC Press	212	978-1-60360-103-0
The Vault of Horror	3	The Vault of Horror #24 – 29	Mike Richardson	2014	Dark Horse	216	978-1-61655-292-3
The Vault of Horror	4	The Vault of Horror #30 – 35	Jonathan Maberry	2015	Dark Horse	216	978-1-61655-519-1
The Vault of Horror	5	The Vault of Horror #36 – 40	Daniel Chabon	2018	Dark Horse	184	978-1-5067-0651-1
War Against Crime	1	War Against Crime #1 – 6	David Lapham	2018	Dark Horse	208	978-1-5067-0502-6
War Against Crime	2	War Against Crime #7 – 11	Dean Motter	2020	Dark Horse	176	978-1-5067-1196-6
Weird Fantasy	1	Weird Fantasy #13 – 17; Weird Fantasy #6	Walt Simonson	2014	Dark Horse	216	978-1-61655-293-0
Weird Fantasy	2	Weird Fantasy #7 – 12	Gene Simmons	2016	Dark Horse	216	978-1-5067-0014-4
Weird Fantasy	3	Weird Fantasy #13 – 18	Ron Parker	2018	Dark Horse	216	978-1-5067-0501-9
Weird Fantasy	4	Weird Fantasy #19 – 22; Weird Science-Fantasy #25 – 26	Evan Dorkin	2019	Dark Horse	216	978-1-5067-0923-9
Weird Science	1	Weird Science #12 – 15; Weird Science #5 – 6	George Lucas	2006	Gemstone	212	978-1-888472-58-5
Weird Science	2	Weird Science #7 – 12	Paul Levitz	2007	Gemstone	212	978-1-888472-69-1
Weird Science	3	Weird Science #13 – 18	Jerry Weist / Ray Bradbury	2008	Gemstone (Note: A printing defect saw most copies withheld by the publisher for an erroneously missing cover illustration to be inserted.)	212	978-1-60360-010-1
Weird Science	4	Weird Science #19 – 22; Weird Science-Fantasy #23 – 24	Harlan Ellison	2015	Dark Horse	216	978-1-61655-658-7

== Chronological release of EC Archives Hardcover volumes ==
- Weird Science Volume 1 (6 December 2006)
- Shock SuspenStories Volume 1 (6 December 2006)
- Tales from the Crypt Volume 1 (14 February 2007)
- Two-Fisted Tales Volume 1 (28 February 2007)
- Weird Science Volume 2 (18 April 2007)
- Shock SuspenStories Volume 2 (30 May 2007)
- Tales from the Crypt Volume 2 (20 June 2007)
- Two-Fisted Tales Volume 2 (8 August 2007)
- The Vault of Horror Volume 1 (20 October 2007)
- Crime SuspenStories Volume 1 (16 January 2008)
- Weird Science Volume 3 (30 July 2008)
- Tales from the Crypt Volume 3 (10 September 2008)
- Frontline Combat Volume 1 (14 October 2008)
- The Haunt of Fear Volume 1 (4 January 2012)
- The Vault of Horror Volume 2 (4 January 2012)
- Tales From The Crypt Volume 4 (30 October 2013)
- The Vault of Horror Volume 3 (5 February 2014)
- Weird Fantasy Volume 1 (30 April 2014)
- Two-Fisted Tales Volume 3 (30 July 2014)
- Tales From The Crypt Volume 5 (29 October 2014)
- The Vault of Horror Volume 4 (28 January 2015)
- Shock SuspenStories Volume 3 (6 May 2015)
- Weird Science Volume 4 (29 July 2015)
- Haunt of Fear Volume 2 (28 October 2015)
- Panic Volume 1 (9 February 2016)
- The Haunt of Fear Volume 3 (7 June 2016)
- Weird Fantasy Volume 2 (11 October 2016)
- Crime Suspenstories Volume 2 (3 January 2017)
- Valor (7 March 2017)
- The Haunt of Fear Volume 4 (25 April 2017)
- Crime Suspenstories Volume 3 (27 June 2017)
- Incredible Science Fiction (22 August 2017)
- Aces High (31 October 2017)
- Panic Volume 2 (26 December 2017)
- Extra! (24 April 2018)
- Weird Fantasy Volume 3 (26 June 2018)
- War Against Crime Volume 1 (21 August 2018)
- The Haunt of Fear Volume 5 (23 October 2018)
- The Vault of Horror Volume 5 (25 December 2018)
- Piracy (26 February 2019)
- Two-Fisted Tales Volume 4 (23 April 2019)
- Weird Fantasy Volume 4 (9 July 2019)
- Crime SuspenStories Volume 4 (27 August 2019)
- Frontline Combat Volume 2 (22 October 2019)
- Modern Love (24 December 2019)
- Psychoanalysis (18 February 2020)
- Impact (14 April 2020)
- War Against Crime Volume 2 (16 June 2020)
- Shock Illustrated (20 April 2021)
- Saddle Justice (15 June 2021)
- MD (17 August 2021)
- Frontline Combat Volume 3 (16 November 2021)
- Crime Illustrated (11 January 2022)
- Terror Illustrated (8 March 2022)
- Gunfighter (19 April 2022)
- Confessions Illustrated (5 July 2022)
- Crime Patrol Volume 1 (27 September 2022)
- The Complete Moon Girl (1 July 2025)

== Leather-bound signed and numbered boxed editions ==
- The EC Archives: Weird Science Volume 1 (February 2008) signed by Al Feldstein, edition of 300
- The EC Archives: Weird Science Volume 2 (August 2008) signed by Al Williamson, edition of 300
- The EC Archives: Shock SuspenStories Volume 1 (October 2009) signed by Al Feldstein, edition of 300
- The EC Archives: Shock SuspenStories Volume 2 (October 2009) signed by Jack Kamen, edition of 300

These four limited editions each came packaged inside a custom clamshell box. with a pair of white gloves for handling of the expensive volumes.

== See also ==
- Another Rainbow Publishing
- DC Archive Editions
- EC Comics
- Gladstone Publishing
- Gemstone Publishing
- List of comic books on CD/DVD
- List of Entertaining Comics publications
- Marvel Masterworks
- Nostalgia Press
