= Kong the Untamed =

Comic book series by DC Comics, 1975–1976

- Cover to Kong the Untamed #4, art by Bill Draut.

Publication information
- Publisher: DC Comics
- Schedule: bimonthly
- Publication date: June/July 1975-February/March 1976
- No. of issues: 5
- Main character(s): Kong

Creative team
- Created by: Jack Oleck; Alfredo Alcala
- Written by: Jack Oleck
- Artist(s): Alfredo Alcala
- Penciller(s): Bernie Wrightson

Kong the Untamed is a comic book series published by DC Comics that ran for five issues. It was created in 1975 by writer Jack Oleck and artist Alfredo Alcala. The title character, Kong, is an intelligent caveman who is a direct descendant of Anthro, another DC Comics caveman character. He befriends a neanderthal names Gurat.
