= The Vault of Horror (comics) =

American horror comic anthology series

- The Vault of Horror #13 (June/July 1950); Cover art by Johnny Craig

Publication information
- Publisher: EC Comics
- Schedule: Bi-monthly
- Format: Anthology
- Publication date: April/May 1950 – December/January 1955
- No. of issues: 29
- Main character(s): The Vault-Keeper; The Crypt-Keeper; The Old Witch

Creative team
- Created by: Bill Gaines; Al Feldstein

The Vault of Horror is an American bi-monthly horror comic anthology series that was published by EC Comics from 1950 to 1955 created by Bill Gaines and Al Feldstein. The magazine began in March 1948 as War Against Crime. It continued under this title for 11 issues before becoming The Vault of Horror with issue #12 (April/May 1950). The comic ran for 29 issues until being discontinued after issue #40 (December/January 1955).

Along with Tales from the Crypt and The Haunt of Fear, it formed a trifecta of popular EC horror anthologies. Publication ceased, however, after horror and crime comics came under scrutiny for an alleged link to juvenile delinquency and the subsequent imposition of a highly restrictive Comics Code.

The Vault of Horror has since been reprinted in single issues and collected volumes. Some of its stories were adapted for the 1972 motion picture Tales from the Crypt and television's Tales from the Crypt, which aired on HBO from 1989 to 1996.

== Production history ==
=== Original run ===
In 1950, EC Comics publisher Bill Gaines and his editor, Al Feldstein, began experimenting with horror tales in their crime titles, War Against Crime and Crime Patrol. With issue #12 (April/May 1950), War Against Crime was replaced with The Vault of Horror. Due to an attempt to save money on second-class postage permits, characteristic of comics publishing in the era, the numbering did not change with the title.

The Vault of Horror continued to run for a total of 29 issues before ceasing publication with issue #40 (December/January 1955). Along with its sister titles, The Haunt of Fear and Tales from the Crypt, The Vault of Horror was popular, but in the late 1940s and early 1950s comic books came under attack from parents, clergymen, schoolteachers, and others who believed the magazines contributed to illiteracy and juvenile delinquency. In April and June 1954, highly publicized congressional subcommittee hearings on the effects of comic books upon children left the industry shaken. With the subsequent imposition of a highly restrictive Comics Code, EC Comics publisher Bill Gaines cancelled The Vault of Horror and its two companion horror titles.

=== Reprints ===
The Vault of Horror has been reprinted on numerous occasions. Ballantine Books reprinted selected stories in a series of paperback anthologies from 1964 to 1966. Other stories were reprinted in Horror Comics of the 1950s by Nostalgia Press (1971), edited by Bhob Stewart and Ron Barlow. Publisher Russ Cochran released six issues in his EC Portfolio (1971–77). East Coast Comix reprinted issue #26 in the early 1970s. The magazine was fully collected in a series of five black-and-white hardbacks by Cochran as part of The Complete EC Library in the early 1980s. Cochran also reprinted the title in a standard comic book format (out of sequence) during the early 1990s in association with Gladstone Publishing. He eventually reprinted the run in proper sequence during the late 1990s with Gemstone Publishing. This complete run was later rebound, with covers included, in a series of six softcover EC Annuals. In 2007, Cochran and Gemstone began to publish hardcover, re-colored volumes of The Vault of Horror as part of the EC Archives series. One volume (of a projected five) was published by Gemstone before their financial troubles left the project in limbo. A second volume was published by GC Press, a boutique imprint established by Cochran and Grant Geissman, in January 2012. Dark Horse Comics resumed publication of the series in 2014. The complete five-volume series was later republished as over-sized trade paperbacks from 2021 to 2024.

== Production ==
=== Creative team ===
Like its horror companion titles, Tales from the Crypt and The Haunt of Fear, The Vault of Horror had its own distinctive qualities and atmosphere—in this case, created by its main artist, Johnny Craig. Craig illustrated all the covers for the entire run and was responsible for the lead story of all but issues #13 and #33. He also wrote all his own stories (save two) in Vault, something rarely done at EC, and became editor with issue #35 (February/March 1954). Bill Gaines and Al Feldstein wrote almost every other story until late 1953 to early 1954 when outside writers Carl Wessler and Jack Oleck were hired. Other contributing artists to The Vault of Horror were Feldstein, George Evans, Jack Kamen, Wally Wood, Graham Ingels, Harvey Kurtzman, Jack Davis, Sid Check, Al Williamson, Joe Orlando, Reed Crandall, Bernard Krigstein, Harry Harrison, and Howard Larsen.

=== Influences and adaptations ===
As with the other EC comics edited by Feldstein, the stories in this comic were primarily based on Gaines using existing horror stories and films to develop "springboards" from which he and Feldstein could launch new stories. Specific story influences that have been identified include the following:

- "Portrait in Wax" (#12): Michael Curtiz's Mystery of the Wax Museum
- "Doctor of Horror" (#13): Robert Louis Stevenson's "The Body Snatcher"
- "Island of Death" (#13): Richard Connell's "The Most Dangerous Game"
- "Rats Have Sharp Teeth" (#14): Henry Kuttner's "The Graveyard Rats"
- "Fitting Punishment" (#16): H. P. Lovecraft's "In the Vault"
- "Terror on the Moors" (#17): Clark Ashton Smith's "The Nameless Offspring"
- "Baby It's Cold Inside" (#17): H. P. Lovecraft's "Cool Air"
- "Voodoo Horror" (#17): Oscar Wilde's The Picture of Dorian Gray
- "The Mask of Horror" (#18): Robert Bloch's "The Cloak"
- "The Jellyfish" (#19): Ray Bradbury's "Skeleton"
- "Daddy Lost His Head" (#19): Robert Bloch's "Sweets to the Sweet"
- "Grandma's Ghost" (#20): Stephen Grendon's "Mr. George"
- "The Monster in the Ice" (#22): Christian Nyby's The Thing from Another World and Mary Shelley's Frankenstein
- "What the Dog Dragged In" (#22): Ray Bradbury's "The Emissary"
- "We Ain't Got No Body" (#28): Clark Ashton Smith's "The Return of the Sorcerer"
- "Star Light, Star Bright" (#34): Carl Theodor Dreyer's Vampyr
- "Ashes to Ashes" (issue 40): Mary Shelley's Frankenstein

After their unauthorized adaptation of one of Ray Bradbury's stories in another magazine, Bradbury contacted EC about their plagiarism of his work. They reached an agreement for EC to do authorized versions of Bradbury's short fiction. These official adaptations include:

- "Let's Play Poison" (#29)
- "The Lake" (#31)

== The Vault-Keeper ==
The Vault-Keeper (left) and Drusilla (right) as drawn by Johnny Craig

Although EC's horror stable consisted of three separate magazines, there was little beyond their titles to distinguish them from one another. Each magazine had its own host, known as a GhouLunatic. The Vault-Keeper was the primary host of The Vault of Horror. Hosting duties for any one magazine were typically shared with the hosts of the other two. For example, a single issue of The Vault of Horror would contain two stories told by the Vault-Keeper, one by the Crypt-Keeper (of Tales from the Crypt) and one by the Old Witch (of The Haunt of Fear). The professional rivalry among these three GhouLunatics was often played for comedic effect in the letter column.

The Vault-Keeper was introduced in War Against Crime #10, and he continued with the magazine after its rebranding. The character began as a frightening presence in the early issues, shown as an ancient inquisitor, hooded and robed, presiding over the empty dungeon of his bloody past. He soon evolved into a more comedic horror host, delivering an irreverent and pun-filled commentary to lighten the horrific tone of the stories he introduced. Occasionally, the Vault-Keeper would appear as a character as well. "Horror Beneath the Streets" (The Haunt of Fear #17) tells how he and his fellow GhouLunatics got their EC publishing contracts.

Drusilla, a mysterious woman with pale complexion and long black hair, was added as a co-host beginning with The Vault of Horror #37.

== List of issues ==
The Vault of Horror issues
| Issue # | Date | Story title | Story artist | Summary (GhouLunatic host) |
|---|---|---|---|---|
| 12 | Apr/May 1950 | Portrait in Wax! | Johnny Craig | A greedy man murders his roommate and dumps the corpse in a vat of acid in order to profit from his artistic work. A strange old man and his creepy wax museum enter the man's life to exact some vengeance. (The Vault-Keeper) |
| 12 | Apr/May 1950 | The Werewolf Legend | Wally Wood & Harry Harrison | Walter Mallory is a rich heir who believes that he is the culprit of several gruesome murders about his estate—murders that only happen on the night of a full moon. (No host) |
| 12 | Apr/May 1950 | Horror in the Night | Harvey Kurtzman | Tom Hawkins owns a roadside motel and relates to his friend the story of his strange dream in which a man and his ghoulish wife rent a room and a night of murder ensues. But, is it just a dream? |
| 12 | Apr/May 1950 | Terror Train | Al Feldstein | Gloria is convinced her husband, Ralph, is trying to kill her, so she runs off and boards a train. The problem is that Ralph keeps popping up everywhere she looks, even in a lonely cabin that contains a single open coffin. (No host) |
| 13 | Jun/July 1950 | The Dead Will Return! | Al Feldstein | Bert and Florence have just done away with the latter's husband and dump his body into the sea next to the lighthouse he used to own hoping to find a hidden stash of money near the place. Too bad that the ever-rotting corpse keeps washing up on the shore. (The Vault-Keeper) |
| 13 | Jun/July 1950 | The Curse of Harkley Heath | Wally Wood & Harry Harrison | Charles, Sybil, and Edgar are the last heirs to the crumbling remains of Harkley Heath, which is reported to be cursed. When Charles and Edgar plot to get Sybil out of the way they find out the true power of the curse. (No host) |
| 13 | Jun/July 1950 | Doctor of Horror | Graham Ingels | Poor Doctor Lemonet must find a way to bring in more students to his anatomy classes, but there is a shortage in cadavers. So the good physician turns to grave robbing and a little foul play. (No host) |
| 13 | Jun/July 1950 | Island of Death | Harvey Kurtzman | Steve and Alec's jet crashes into a lonely island in the Pacific, Alec seeming to have disappeared. Steve then comes upon a castle where a strange count and his manservant live. The count enjoys a good game of sport, especially when it comes to hunting humans. (No host) |
| 14 | Aug/Sept 1950 | Voodoo Vengeance! | Johnny Craig | A befuddled old husband realizes his beautiful wife is having an affair with a younger man and turns to a voodoo priest for assistance. He is given a doll in the likeness of his wife, which he uses to inflict a little payback. (The Vault-Keeper) |
| 14 | Aug/Sept 1950 | Werewolf | Jules Feiffer & Harry Harrison | A group of hikers take residence in a mountaintop cabin, but Jan Bodzla, their Romanian guide, believes that one of them is a ravenous werewolf and will do anything to kill the beast. (No host) |
| 14 | Aug/Sept 1950 | Rats Have Sharp Teeth! | Graham Ingels | Abner Tucker uses his position as town historian to rob the graves of the wealthy but is pestered by the filthy rats that scuttle about the tunnels. He sets up traps to slay the rodents, but those furry fiends will chew through anything. (No host) |
| 14 | Aug/Sept 1950 | The Strange Couple! | Al Feldstein | A you-are-the-main-character story in which your car has stalled on a lonely road one dark and stormy night. You decide to seek shelter in a nearby cottage where a vampire husband and his ghoul wife are just dying to let you stay the night. (The Vault-Keeper) |
| 15 | Oct/Nov 1950 | Horror House! | Johnny Craig | Henry is a struggling comic book writer whose rowdy friends throw parties every day in his apartment, so he rents a lonely house in the country which is rumored to be haunted. In an attempt to get him back, three of his friends plan to scare him out of the house with smoke and mirrors. If only they knew that something was lurking inside. (The Vault-Keeper) |
| 15 | Oct/Nov 1950 | Terror in the Swamp! | Al Feldstein | An old hermit relates to two travelers the story of a group of scientists who accidentally created an amoeba that devoured anything in its path and grew with each feeding. The travelers should have heeded the tale. Reprinted from The Haunt of Fear #15 (1) (May/Jun 1950) where it appeared as "The Thing in the Swamp!" (The Old Witch) |
| 15 | Oct/Nov 1950 | Report from the Grave | Jack Kamen | As part of his initiation into the Vault-Keeper's Club, Warren must go into the local cemetery and retrieve a watch from a recently deceased member. When he discovers a molding skeleton in its place, Warren unearths a mystery of murder and revenge. (The Vault-Keeper) |
| 15 | Oct/Nov 1950 | Buried Alive! | Graham Ingels | Two carnival workers, Sam "The Great Zobo" and his girlfriend, Rita, plot to blackmail a rich man into murdering the Great Zobo who has the talent of "shallow breathing." When Rita decides to leave Sam six feet under, a series of circumstances allow him to get revenge. (The Vault-Keeper) |
| 16 | Dec/Jan 1951 | Werewolf Concerto | Johnny Craig | Hubert Antone is the manager of a hotel in Hungary whose customers are being murdered by what appears to be a savage animal. The arrival of a strange pianist adds to the mystery, and things start getting hairy. (The Vault-Keeper) |
| 16 | Dec/Jan 1951 | Fitting Punishment | Graham Ingels | Stanley is an orphan who goes to the home of his miserly Uncle Ezra and assists him in his undertaking business. Ezra is a fanatic penny pincher and decides to kill his nephew to fill an unwanted coffin. He is a bit too tall for it though. (The Vault-Keeper) |
| 16 | Dec/Jan 1951 | The Grave Wager | Jack Kamen | Paul, Clyde, and Roger attend a carnival where they see Pirro, "The Wax Man", who can stay completely still. Paul and Clyde plot to pull a practical joke on Roger by betting him that he could not spend an entire night in a room with a corpse (Pirro in actuality). When Pirro decides to scare Roger, the real horror begins. (The Vault-Keeper) |
| 16 | Dec/Jan 1951 | Escape! | Al Feldstein | Pete Luger is a hardened criminal who serves in the prison's rockyard, lugging bricks back and forth. He soon hits upon the idea to stow himself away in a coffin and be driven out of prison in the hearse. Once he seals himself up in the casket, the heat is on. (The Old Witch) |
| 17 | Feb/Mar 1951 | Terror on the Moors! | Johnny Craig | Jim Ryan gets stranded on the moors and decides to spend the night in a crumbling mansion nearby. The old man and his servant who live there seem to be oblivious to the bloodcurdling screams and frantic scratchings that ring out in the house. (The Vault-Keeper) |
| 17 | Feb/Mar 1951 | Baby... It's Cold Inside! | Graham Ingels | Barton Gordon applies for the job of superintendent at an apartment building and meets the ghoulish-looking and strangely mannered landlord, Marcus Kingsley, who insists that his room be refrigerated at all times. When the air conditioner busts, a foul odor emanates from Kingley's room. (The Old Witch) |
| 17 | Feb/Mar 1951 | The Beast of the Full Moon! | Jack Davis | Tom believes his brother, Andrew, was inflicted with the curse of the werewolf on a hunting trip, and the recent string of murders seem to confirm his suspicions. He sets a trap for his brother and plans to end his mayhem once and for all. (The Vault-Keeper) |
| 17 | Feb/Mar 1951 | Voodoo Horror! | Jack Kamen | George Barker visits Haiti to have a voodoo bust of his likeness made by a strange priest in a weird ritual. Returning to the United States, George remains young as the bust takes on the evil of his deeds. (The Crypt-Keeper) |
| 18 | Apr/May 1951 | Sink-Hole! | Johnny Craig | Sick of her boring farm life and stingy, elderly husband, Aldous, Shirley knocks him over the head with a frying pan and hurls the body into a yawning sink hole. But she should have known that all is well that ends well. (The Vault-Keeper) |
| 18 | Apr/May 1951 | Lend Me a Hand! | Jack Davis | The brilliant Dr. Johnstone gets in a terrible car accident and must have his right hand removed. Devastated, he murders a wino, cuts off his hand and buries him in the garden. Johnstone then attempts to revive the hand in his laboratory. (The Vault-Keeper) |
| 18 | Apr/May 1951 | The Mask of Horror | Jack Kamen | Ken purchases a ghoulish zombie mask from a dusty costume shop but was warned by the eerie proprietor that his masks reflect the character of the people who wear them. After spying on his cheating wife, he meets a mysterious woman in a vampire mask at a masquerade who shows him a fangtastic time. (The Vault-Keeper) |
| 18 | Apr/May 1951 | Dying to Lose Weight! | Graham Ingels | Dr. Perdo arrives in a small town offering a miracle formula to help cure obesity in the form of capsules. The results are amazing as the customers start slimming down... and then waste away. When the town physician examines one of the corpses, he reveals just what was inside the pills. (The Old Witch) |
| 19 | Jun/July 1951 | Southern Hospitality | Johnny Craig | A seemingly sweet young man marries into a rich Southern family to reap all the benefits. He ultimately tears up the family but only to be visited by a very angry, vengeful ancestor. (The Vault-Keeper) |
| 19 | Jun/July 1951 | The Jellyfish! | Jack Davis | Two doctored brothers find their relationship torn when one sends the other to jail for "tampering" with a patient's insulin, but while in jail the brother decides to create a revengeful plan. (The Crypt-Keeper) |
| 19 | Jun/July 1951 | Daddy Lost His Head!! | Jack Kamen | An abusive father gets his just deserts at the hands of his young daughter after she befriends a peculiar neighbor. (The Vault-Keeper) |
| 19 | Jun/July 1951 | Reunion! | Graham Ingels | An unfaithful wife decides to get involved with another man when her husband becomes terminally ill. She meets him every couple of years deep in the marsh, even when he has been dead for years. (The Old Witch) |
| 20 | Aug/Sept 1951 | About Face! | Johnny Craig | A renowned lion trainer finds herself disfigured after she is attacked by a panther. She locks herself away from the world until she meets Steve, her sweet talking limo driver, and soon marries him. But, she soon finds that he is only in it for the money and decides to take revenge on his beauty, too, using witchcraft. (The Vault-Keeper) |
| 20 | Aug/Sept 1951 | The Reluctant Vampire! | Jack Davis | A lazy vampire decides to work for a blood bank since he does not like killing to quench his thirst, but when the bank goes into debt, he decides to help fill it up... with the blood of innocent townsfolk. (The Crypt-Keeper) |
| 20 | Aug/Sept 1951 | Grandma's Ghost! | Jack Kamen | Peggy, a young girl, finds herself in the care of her wicked aunt and uncle when her Grandma dies from heart failure, a death that could have been stopped by the aunt and uncle who are after her money. But, when the will is read, they find that Peggy has inherited all her Grandma's money, so they decide to do away with the little girl, but not if Grandma has anything to say about it! (The Vault-Keeper) |
| 20 | Aug/Sept 1951 | Revenge Is the Nuts'! | Graham Ingels | An old insane asylum is run by a cruel, wicked man who delights in beating and torturing his patients, only to find that revenge can really be the nuts'! (The Old Witch) |
| 21 | Oct/Nov 1951 | One Last Fling! | Johnny Craig | Harry and Olga, a married circus couple, find their life torn apart, when Olga is turned into a vampire and cannot control her quench for human blood, including Harry's own blood, but how can she be stopped? (The Vault-Keeper) |
| 21 | Oct/Nov 1951 | That's a 'Croc'! | Howard Larsen | A crazed, lonely zookeeper obsessed with the crocodile pit sees to it that they are fed promptly and suitably, even going as far as to supplying them with what the maneaters crave: man. (The Old Witch) |
| 21 | Oct/Nov 1951 | Child's Play | Jack Kamen | Four boys find themselves victims of harassment by a mean, nasty man who will not let anyone near his house. So, after catching him beat his wife to death and steal their football, they decide to get even by scaring him... to death. (The Vault-Keeper) |
| 21 | Oct/Nov 1951 | Trapped! | Jack Davis | A con man boards a train to lie low for a while and finds himself in a small house that has been rumored to be cursed. He kills the owner and subsequently finds that the property is cursed. (The Crypt-Keeper) |
| 22 | Dec/Jan 1952 | Fountains of Youth! | Johnny Craig | When Ken's sister, Eileen, ages to death overnight while in the care of a woman by the name Madame DuBois, he decides to find out the truth by following her new young assistant, which leads to the "rotten" truth. (The Vault-Keeper) |
| 22 | Dec/Jan 1952 | The Monster in the Ice!! | Graham Ingels | Two geologists and an eskimo find a grotesque body frozen in ice and decide to bring it back with them, but while traveling they realize the body might actually be the body of the true Frankenstein, and soon find it missing. (The Old Witch) |
| 22 | Dec/Jan 1952 | Gone... Fishing! | Jack Davis | Two friends go fishing together at a local beach, where Max shows off his mean-spirited nature by making all the fish he catches suffer gruesome deaths while Steve protests. But later on in the day, Max finds himself in the fins of death and learns what goes around comes around. (The Crypt-Keeper) |
| 22 | Dec/Jan 1952 | What the Dog Dragged In! | Jack Kamen | Betty, a lonely blind woman, lives her life by sending out her trusted dog to fetch supplies and food, until one day when he is struck by a car. The driver takes him to the vet, gets him fixed up, and returns him to Betty, where he falls in love with her, only to die in a car crash while leaving. Betty becomes depressed when she never hears from the man again and sends out her dog to find him. |
| 23 | Feb/Mar 1952 | A Stitch in Time! | Johnny Craig | A sewing machine sweatshop run by a cruel, heartless man erupts into terror when the factory girls decide to get even with their boss after he mistreats one of the girls. (The Vault-Keeper) |
| 23 | Feb/Mar 1952 | 99 44/100% Pure Horror! | Jack Davis | Ernie, the spoiled, cocky owner of a soap company, finds that the former owner, who "mysteriously disappeared", has returned in the form of a bar of soap to "cleanse" Ernie's soul. (The Crypt-Keeper) |
| 23 | Feb/Mar 1952 | Dead Wait! | Jack Davis | Red Buckley, a sleazy con artist, finds his way to a rich plantation where he assists the wealthy owner, who has a renowned black pearl hidden somewhere on the plantation. With Kulu, the native servant of the plantation, Red devises a plan of murder and robbery, but soon finds himself in over his head. (The Vault-Keeper) |
| 23 | Feb/Mar 1952 | Staired... In Horror! | Graham Ingels | A greedy widow meets a rich widower in a cemetery and begins to hit it off hoping to inherit his fortune, but her fear of spiral staircases ultimately decides her doom. (The Old Witch) |
| 24 | Apr/May 1952 | A Bloody Undertaking! | Johnny Craig | A mortician begins dating a beautiful young woman who helps him find an assistant, a creepy, weird assistant who has a habit of disappearing whenever a vampire related death strikes the town. (The Vault-Keeper) |
| 24 | Apr/May 1952 | ...With All the Trappings! | Graham Ingels | A poor elderly man decides to save his earnings during the winter to have a proper burial for his recently deceased wife, but how will she keep until then? (The Old Witch) |
| 24 | Apr/May 1952 | Impressed by a Nightmare! | Joe Orlando | Emma, an everyday housewife, finds herself plagued by nightmares that show what happens in the future, and she tries to save her family from the fate that lies ahead. (The Vault-Keeper) |
| 24 | Apr/May 1952 | The Death Wagon! | Jack Davis | Two con car salesmen begin to sell their doomed cars to poor, innocent people, only to find that no "good" deed goes unpunished. (The Crypt-Keeper) |
| 25 | Jun/July 1952 | Seance! | Johnny Craig | Two con artists target a rich man whose wife believes in psychics, spirits, and mediums, but they find that ghosts and spirits are nothing to fool around with... (The Vault-Keeper) |
| 25 | Jun/July 1952 | Kickin' the Gong a Round! | Jack Davis | A heavyweight boxer is blackmailed by a fellow boxer into losing the fight between them, but when he loses his life as well, the boxer returns for one more match. (The Crypt-Keeper) |
| 25 | Jun/July 1952 | Practical Yolk! | Jack Kamen | A rich sportsman hires an African safari expert to help him navigate while traveling the world and brings him home to meet his fiancée. With the help of black magic, his guide can make any of his wishes come scarily true. (The Vault-Keeper) |
| 25 | Jun/July 1952 | Collection Completed! | Graham Ingels | Anita, a middle aged woman who spends all her time caring for stray animals, finds her life turned inside out when her annoyed, pet-hating husband begins a new hobby... taxidermy! (The Old Witch) |
| 26 | Aug/Sept 1952 | Two of a Kind! | Johnny Craig | A vampire and a ghoul begin to date, eager to kill one another for nourishment, but find they really love each other. Will their love keep them away from each other's throats when they get snowed in at a cabin? (The Vault-Keeper) |
| 26 | Aug/Sept 1952 | Graft in Concrete! | Jack Davis | Four counsel men devise a plan to build a road over a cemetery to expand their resources, but the dead have their own opinions. (The Crypt-Keeper) |
| 26 | Aug/Sept 1952 | Half-Way Horrible! | Sid Check | A man finds that he has multiple personalities—good and bad—so he travels to Haiti to find a voodoo priest to kill the bad side, only to find out he should have known how literal the deal was... (The Vault-Keeper) |
| 26 | Aug/Sept 1952 | Hook, Line, and Stinker! | Graham Ingels | A lonely middle aged woman spends her time waiting for her boyfriend, Stanley, to pop the question. The only problem is Stanley is in love with fishing, so she comes up with a plan to really hook, line, and sink her man. (The Old Witch) |
| 27 | Oct/Nov 1952 | Silver Threads Among the Mold! | Johnny Craig | A nerdy sculptor uses his beautiful girlfriend as a model for a sculptures, but when he catches her with another man, he sculpts one last sculpture with her as not just the model. (The Vault-Keeper) |
| 27 | Oct/Nov 1952 | People Who Live in Brass Hearses... | [Jack Davis | Lionel Byrd is a quiet, odd old man who travels everywhere in a hearse-wagon, and no one knows why—why he never gets off it or why he lives all alone in a cabin in the woods. When two criminals hold up in his cabin, they discover the whole truth. (The Crypt-Keeper) |
| 27 | Oct/Nov 1952 | Strictly From Hunger! | George Evans | A monstrous blob begins to terrorize a small town, and with the help of the town doctor, they figure out where it came from and why it is happening, but how can it be stopped? (The Vault-Keeper) |
| 27 | Oct/Nov 1952 | A Grim Fairy Tale! | Graham Ingels | Once upon a time, a selfish king and queen ruled a kingdom infested with rats, rats that ate everything (and everyone) they could get. However, the king and queen loved rats and would not have them killed, so the townspeople found a way to get even. (The Old Witch) |
| 28 | Dec/Jan 1953 | Till Death... | Johnny Craig | A rich estate owner marries his wife in Haiti but soon loses her to a rare tropical disease. Thinking that his life is over, he entrusts his native servant to perform a voodoo ritual to bring her back. But this love spell is not all it is croaked up to be. (The Vault-Keeper) |
| 28 | Dec/Jan 1953 | The Chips are Down! | Jack Davis | Three sawmill workers are presented with an offer to create wooden discs for the government, and greedily accept, but soon jealousy, greed, and murder begin to get in the way. (The Crypt-Keeper) |
| 28 | Dec/Jan 1953 | For How the Bell Tolls! | George Evans | A bell ringer's assistant becomes jealous after waiting 34 years to ring the bell and murders him in cold blood. He soon learns he should have been scareful what he wished for! (The Vault-Keeper) |
| 28 | Dec/Jan 1953 | We Ain't Got No Body! | Graham Ingels | Three friends find themselves stalked and murdered by Henri, their fourth friend who they pushed off a train in order to get his money. (The Old Witch) |
| 29 | Feb/Mar 1953 | The Mausoleum! | Johnny Craig | A man kills his elderly uncle in order to sell the family castle. His plan backfires when he tries to tear down the attached mausoleum. (The Vault-Keeper) |
| 29 | Feb/Mar 1953 | Let's Play Poison! | Jack Davis | A child-hating schoolteacher is caught up in a sinister playground game. (The Crypt-Keeper) |
| 29 | Feb/Mar 1953 | A Sock for Christmas | Jack Kamen | In a mythical kingdom, a peasant child is sent to the royal castle to be a companion to the spoiled young prince, but his family receives a surprise on Christmas Day. (The Vault-Keeper) |
| 29 | Feb/Mar 1953 | Pickled Pints! | Graham Ingels | Two conmen begin soliciting the homeless for "blood donations" to be sold on to the hospital, but when one of their victims gives a little too much blood, they find themselves paying the price. (The Old Witch) |
| 30 | Apr/May 1953 | Split Personality! | Johnny Craig | A conman tricks a pair of reclusive twin sisters into dating him so he can get his hands on their money, with terrifying results when they discover the ruse. (The Vault-Keeper) |
| 30 | Apr/May 1953 | Who Doughnut? | Jack Davis | A crime reporter believes there is a supernatural explanation behind a series of strange killings in town. (The Crypt-Keeper) |
| 30 | Apr/May 1953 | Practical Choke! | George Evans | Three medical students use the dismembered parts of a corpse to play gruesome pranks. The corpse, however, has other ideas. (The Vault-Keeper) |
| 30 | Apr/May 1953 | Notes to You! | Graham Ingels | A group of men seek revenge on the writer of anonymous "poison pen" letters which have brought disaster to the town. (The Old Witch) |
| 31 | Jun/July 1953 | Easel Kill Ya! | Johnny Craig | An impoverished artist begins to commit murders so he can paint pictures of gruesome death scenes to satisfy a sadistic collector. (The Vault-Keeper) |
| 31 | Jun/July 1953 | A Peachof a Plot! | Jack Davis | When a man denies murdering his wife seven years previously, a very vital clue turns out to be growing in his garden. (The Crypt-Keeper) |
| 31 | Jun/July 1953 | The Lake | Joe Orlando | A man returns to the spot where his first love drowned many years before. Written by Ray Bradbury. (The Vault-Keeper) |
| 31 | Jun/July 1953 | One Good Turn... | Graham Ingels | A charitable woman has an unusual way of "helping" the people in her care. (The Old Witch) |
| 32 | Aug/Sept 1953 | Whirlpool | Johnny Craig | A woman finds herself in an endless tortured nightmare, a nightmare from which she can not seem to wake. (The Vault-Keeper) |
| 32 | Aug/Sept 1953 | Out of His Head! | Jack Davis | A lawyer kills his law partner with a cleaver to the head and disposes his body, only to see him everywhere when he gets back to his lonely penthouse late that night. (The Crypt-Keeper) |
| 32 | Aug/Sept 1953 | An Ample Sample | George Evans | Irwin and Hannah were the perfect couple, until Hannah began spending all their money on boxes of chocolate and candy, fattening herself up and leaving them poor. She soon finds that "you are what you eat", is dead right. (The Vault-Keeper) |
| 32 | Aug/Sept 1953 | Funereal Disease! | Graham Ingels | An old man saves up his money so he can have a proper burial with flowers, music, and mourners, since his family had been buried in plain wooden boxes. When two "friends" of the family decide to do away with him and steal his money, burying him in a coffin, he comes back for a proper burial. (The Old Witch) |
| 33 | Oct/Nov 1953 | Together They Lie! | Reed Crandall | A rich man finds his life turned upside down when his wife dies in a fire but finds out the half-truth about the fire by his scheming maid and lawyer. (The Vault-Keeper) |
| 33 | Oct/Nov 1953 | Let the Punishment Fit the Crime! | Jack Davis | A town slowly catches onto the true horror of a group of kids carrying a coffin to a grave when they think about the questions they asked the town lawyer, doctor, funeral director, and electrician. (The Crypt-Keeper) |
| 33 | Oct/Nov 1953 | A Slight Case of Murder! | George Evans | Doc Swanson, travels to a nearby town that is being terrorized by a string of bloody female murders with an answer to who (or what) is committing the crimes. (The Vault-Keeper) |
| 33 | Oct/Nov 1953 | Strung Along! | Graham Ingels | Tony, a renowned puppet master, is forced into retirement when his heart gives out. He then discovers that his wife never loved him but was only with him for the money. At least his marionettes are with him to keep him company, even carrying out his wishes. (The Old Witch) |
| 34 | Dec/Jan 1954 | Star Light, Star Bright! | Johnny Craig | A man takes the position as master of an insane asylum and begins to become paranoid that the inmates are out to get him. (The Vault-Keeper) |
| 34 | Dec/Jan 1954 | While the Cat's Away... | Jack Davis | John and Frank, two sleazy travel agents, use their job to send rich people on beautiful vacations so they can rob their houses while they are gone, but the two find themselves in one mighty fine predicament when they break into a house of horrors. (The Crypt-Keeper) |
| 34 | Dec/Jan 1954 | Smoke Wrings | Reed Crandall | A shy, nerdy salesman sells his idea about expanding the production of cigarettes to the company's business savvy boss. But when she decides to keep the idea and get the salesmen out of the picture, she finds she may also get "burned". (The Vault-Keeper) |
| 34 | Dec/Jan 1954 | Where There's a Will... | Graham Ingels | Mr. Farber, a dying old man wants to pass on his money to his "loving" family instead of towards a children's orphanage but finds out (with the help of his lawyer) that maybe his family just wants the money, so they stage a phony funeral with deadly results. (The Old Witch) |
| 35 | Feb/Mar 1954 | ...And All Through the House... | Johnny Craig | A housewife murders her husband on Christmas Eve only to find she is trapped in the house by an escaped mental patient dressed up as Santa Claus. (The Vault-Keeper) |
| 35 | Feb/Mar 1954 | Tombs-Day! | Jack Davis | While on an expedition in search of a group of that went missing in an Egyptian tomb, the new party finds themselves locked in the same tomb with the terror that left the first group dead. (The Crypt-Keeper) |
| 35 | Feb/Mar 1954 | Beauty Rest | Jack Kamen | Helen, a jealous prospective model and actress, decides to steal her roommate's moment in glory as Miss Corpse of 1954, but she finds that modeling can be murder. (The Vault-Keeper) |
| 35 | Feb/Mar 1954 | Shoe-Button Eyes! | Graham Ingels | A little boy who was born blind, finds comfort in his teddy bear with blue shoe button eyes and his single mother, but when she remarries an abusive drunk, he learns that toys can be loyal. (The Old Witch) |
| 36 | Apr/May 1954 | Twin Bill! | Johnny Craig | A man murders his wife and her adulterous lover with the promise they will now be "together forever." He soon finds out how true this is when he attempts to recover his car from the scene of the crime. (The Vault-Keeper) |
| 36 | Apr/May 1954 | Witch Witch's Witch! | Jack Davis | A young nobleman causes scandal by abandoning his fiancée to marry a new woman. When an evil plague strikes the town, his bride is accused of sorcery, but is she the witch responsible? (The Crypt-Keeper) |
| 36 | Apr/May 1954 | Pipe Dream | Bernard Krigstein | In China, an old man who frequents an opium den discovers that his smoke-induced hallucinations are coming true. (The Vault-Keeper) |
| 36 | Apr/May 1954 | Two-Timed! | Graham Ingels | A young boy barely escapes with his life after witnessing a murder. Many years later, he attempts to kill his adulterous wife but finds his past coming back to haunt him. (The Old Witch) |
| 37 | Jun/July 1954 | Surprise Party! | Johnny Craig | A handsome young man drives to a town where he has inherited some land and goes out for a night on the town. He finds an unmapped road that leads to a dance party at a mansion, a party that proves history has a nasty way of repeating itself. (The Vault-Keeper) |
| 37 | Jun/July 1954 | Chop Talk! | Jack Davis | Emil, an average, everyday civilian kills his lover when she ends their relationship and finds that her husband is her executioner with more than just an axe to bury. (The Crypt-Keeper) |
| 37 | Jun/July 1954 | Take Care | Al Williamson | An old man looking for money takes a job as caretaker of an old house in which a wealthy, dying man was murdered by his assistant. The killer, however, was never apprehended, and that is not just the house making noises... (The Vault-Keeper) |
| 37 | Jun/July 1954 | Oh! Henry! | Graham Ingels | A hard-nosed cop who finds pleasure in booking criminals catches an old woman stealing from a grocery store and arrests her, throwing her in jail for 60 days despite her pleas about her so-called husband, Henry. (The Old Witch) |
| 38 | Aug/Sept 1954 | Any Sport In A Storm | Johnny Craig | A rude fisherman stops in a harbor where legend has it that a sea hag claims any man she meets. Not believing the legend, he goes to sea to deliver his shipped goods, finding a lighthouse and that there may be truth to the legend. (The Vault-Keeper) |
| 38 | Aug/Sept 1954 | Coffin Spell! | Jack Davis | Nadyi and Janos, two grave robbers who supply a college professor with cadavers for his students to dissect, discover several coffins in a mausoleum and find that this grave robbing may be their last. (The Crypt-Keeper) |
| 38 | Aug/Sept 1954 | The Catacombs | Bernard Krigstein | Two Italian men rob a man of his silver and decide to hide it in the catacombs until the police stop looking. However, the wine trail they left to find their way out has mysteriously vanished, and their lantern is about to go out. (The Vault-Keeper) |
| 38 | Aug/Sept 1954 | Out of Sight... | Graham Ingels | Clyde Evans, a circus marvel billed as "The Great Brain", begins to mistreat his slow, but giant assistant Benny, who turns to one of the top dancers, Hulda, for help. She soon falls in love with Benny and tries to protect him but finds that she too is victim to Clyde. Finally, Benny decides to stand up for himself, ending the showdown with a bloody finish. (The Old Witch) |
| 39 | Oct/Nov 1954 | Deadly Beloved! | Johnny Craig | A struggling writer finds himself stranded on a swamp and seeks shelter in a burned house owned by the beautiful Eloise, a girl for which he would gladly die. (The Vault-Keeper) |
| 39 | Oct/Nov 1954 | Top Billing | Reed Crandall | Three struggling actors come across a theater and meet the frazzled director and beg him for a part, but they begin to turn on each other for the role, a part that is a dead guarantee. (The Crypt-Keeper) |
| 39 | Oct/Nov 1954 | The Purge | Bernard Krigstein | A king finds himself falling for a beautiful woman who is locked up and awaiting execution. He decides to have a sorcerer cleanse her soul and rid her of her possession, but not all intentions are pure. (The Vault-Keeper) |
| 39 | Oct/Nov 1954 | Allfor Gnawt | Graham Ingels | Millie, a crude bluebeard-ess, answers an ad about an old rich man seeking company. She moves in with him, only to find that he hides his money somewhere in the house—that is, if the rats that have infested the house have not already found it. (The Old Witch) |
| 40 | Dec/Jan 1955 | Old Man Mose! | Johnny Craig | A frontiersman and his wife take pity on the town outcast, an elderly hunchback named Mose, and hire him as a handyman on their ranch. Things go well until a dead body is found, brutally slaughtered. (The Vault-Keeper) |
| 40 | Dec/Jan 1955 | An Harrow Escape! | Joe Orlando | A dying yachtsman tells two Coast Guard officers about his and his fiancée's nightmarish stay on the island of Castle Harrow and how they escaped. At least, he thought they had... (The Crypt-Keeper) |
| 40 | Dec/Jan 1955 | The Pit! | Bernard Krigstein | To pay for their wives' extravagant lifestyles, two men secretly hold cockfights and dog fights, until Lila and Beatrice's vicious jealousy of one another drives them to hold a "catfight". (The Vault-Keeper) |
| 40 | Dec/Jan 1955 | Ashes to Ashes! | Graham Ingels | In a twist on the Frankenstein story, a father and son have passed down an experiment to create life by artificially stimulating evolution in ooze dug from the primordial muck of a swamp. Finally, the experiment has birthed life, and Emil, last of the Frankensteins, is to oversee the creature's rearing into adulthood and the wedding to its unsuspecting betrothed. (The Old Witch) |

== In other media ==
"And All Through the House" (#35) was adapted for the 1972 film, Tales from the Crypt from Amicus Productions. Four other stories came from Tales from the Crypt and The Haunt of Fear. A second Amicus film, The Vault of Horror (1973) is named after this comic, but it did not use any stories published in The Vault of Horror. An homage film entitled Creepshow (1982) followed from Warner Brothers, paying tribute to the tone, look, and feel of Vault and other EC comics without directly adapting any of their stories.

Some stories were also adapted for the HBO television series Tales from the Crypt, which features John Kassir as the voice of the Crypt-Keeper and included comic book covers designed by Mike Vosburg—with at least one drawn by Shawn McManus—to look like the original 1950s covers. The series ran for seven seasons from 1989 to 1996 and spawned 93 episodes.

The following tales were used in HBO's Tales from the Crypt TV series: "Horror in the Night" (#12), "Doctor of Horror" (#13), "Report from the Grave" (#15), "Fitting Punishment" (#16), "Werewolf Concerto" (#16), "Revenge Is the Nuts" (#20), "The Reluctant Vampire" (#20), "Dead Wait" (#23), "Staired in Horror" (#23), "99 & 44/100% Pure Horror" (#23), "Collection Completed" (#25), "Seance" (#25), "Half-Way Horrible" (#26), "People Who Live in Brass Hearses" (#27), " 'Til Death" (#28), "Split Personality" (#30), "Easel Kill Ya" (#31), "Whirlpool" (#32), "Strung Along" (#33), "Let the Punishment Fit the Crime" (#33), "A Slight Case of Murder" (#33), "Smoke Wrings" (#34), "And All Through the House" (#35), "Beauty Rest" (#35), "Surprise Party" (#37), "Top Billing" (#39), and "The Pit" (#40).

HBO's Tales from the Crypt was adapted into a Saturday morning cartoon series called Tales from the Cryptkeeper in 1993. It lacked the violence and other questionable content that was in the original series. Kassir reprised his role as the voice of the Crypt-Keeper. The Vault-Keeper appeared as a character, voiced by David Hemblen. It ran for three seasons from 1993 to 1994 and in 1999, spawning 39 episodes.

In 2019, AudioComics Company, released the first season of EC Comics Presents The Vault of Horror, a full-cast audio drama adapting the first 24 stories from the first six issues of the original comics (#12–17). It featured a cast of more than 60 actors, including Philip Proctor and Denise Poirier, while the voice of the Vault-Keeper was supplied by Kevin Grevioux. The complete over 8-hour audio drama was released in audiobook format in October 2019, then as a podcast in March 2020.

A pinball machine, Tales from the Crypt, was produced under license by Data East in 1993. The game incorporates art from the original comics as well as the HBO series.

== Sources ==
- Goulart, Ron (2001). Great American Comic Books. Publications International. ISBN 978-0-7853-5590-8.
- Overstreet, Robert L (2004). Official Overstreet Comic Book Price Guide. House of Collectibles. ISBN 978-1-4000-4669-0.
