= Gemstone Publishing =

American publishing company in the comics field

- Parent company: Geppi Family Enterprises
- Status: Defunct in November 2008 as comic book publisher; continues to publish the comic book price guide Overstreet
- Founded: 1994; 32 years ago
- Founder: Steve Geppi
- Country of origin: United States
- Headquarters location: Timonium, Maryland
- Distribution: Diamond Book Distributors (books)
- Publication types: Annuals
- Official website: www.gemstonepub.com/en/

Gemstone Publishing is an American company that publishes comic book price guides. The company was formed by Diamond Comic Distributors President and Chief Executive Officer Steve Geppi in 1994 when he bought Overstreet.

Gemstone published licensed Disney comic books from June 2003 until November 2008. The company has also reprinted EC Comics of the 1950s.

BOOM! Kids acquired all comic publishing licenses regarding Disney characters in the second half of 2009.

== Disney comics ==
Gemstone's flagship publications were comic books featuring Disney characters; particularly the Donald Duck/Uncle Scrooge comics of such Duck artists as Carl Barks and Don Rosa, and the Mickey Mouse comics of Floyd Gottfredson, César Ferioli, and Romano Scarpa, among others.

While popularly known as a reprint house, Gemstone's comics were actually dominated by stories that were new to United States audiences. Vintage material, though popular with readers, was not the majority of the content.

Name	Number of pages	Format	Status	Stories featuring
Walt Disney's Comics and Stories	64 (68 w/covers)	Prestige	Ended	Donald Duck, Mickey Mouse, Goofy, Big Bad Wolf, Brer Rabbit, Bucky Bug, Fethry Duck, Grandma Duck, Jr. Woodchucks, Scamp
Uncle Scrooge	64 (68 w/covers)	Prestige	Ended	Scrooge McDuck, Gyro Gearloose, Beagle Boys, Launchpad McQuack, Magica De Spell, Fethry Duck, Donald Duck
The Barks/Rosa Collection	72 (76 w/covers)	Prestige	Ended	Scrooge McDuck, Donald Duck
Donald Duck Adventures	128 (132 w/covers)	Digest	Ended	Donald Duck, Scrooge McDuck, Mickey Mouse, Duck Avenger
Mickey Mouse Adventures	128 (132 w/covers)	Digest	Ended	Mickey Mouse, Donald Duck, Goofy, Minnie Mouse, Pluto, Ellsworth
Donald Duck and Friends	32 (36 w/covers)	Standard	Ended	Donald Duck, Mickey Mouse, Goofy
Mickey Mouse and Friends	32 (36 w/covers)	Standard	Ended	Mickey Mouse, Donald Duck, Pluto

Gemstone issued annual editions of Christmas Parade, Vacation Parade, and Spring Fever; a giveaway for Free Comic Book Day; and occasional special editions (including comic adaptations of Mickey, Donald, Goofy: The Three Musketeers and Mickey's Twice Upon a Christmas).

Gemstone's first large-size book collection, Mickey And The Gang: Classic Stories In Verse, was issued in November 2005. It was a compilation, edited by David Gerstein, of Disney cartoon story pages published from 1934 to 1944 in Good Housekeeping magazine. Gerstein later edited two Gemstone softcover books that were official tie-ins to the Walt Disney Treasures DVD collections: Disney Comics: 75 Years of Innovation (2006) and Uncle Scrooge: A Little Something Special (2008).

== Russ Cochran and EC Comics reprints ==
Gemstone has also published reprints of EC Comics. Gemstone's Comic Book Marketplace-editor Russ Cochran had previously published (in 1973) a dozen reprints of EC titles including Crypt of Terror, Weird Science, The Haunt of Fear, The Vault of Horror, etc., before moving to Gladstone Publishing and then to Gemstone, which has been the home of Cochran's EC reprints for over 15 years.

Reprinting the Cochran/Gladstone-reprints of The Haunt of Fear, The Vault of Horror and Weird Science (all 1992), Gemstone also republished (in single issue and 'annual' – four issues per 'annual' – format):

- Crime SuspenStories, Shock SuspenStories, Two-Fisted Tales, Weird Fantasy and Weird Science-Fantasy in 1992;
- Incredible Science Fiction (1994)
- Frontline Combat (1995)
- Panic (1997)
- Piracy and Valor (1998)
- Aces High, Impact, M.D. and Psychoanalysis (1999), and
- Crime Patrol and Extra! in 2000.

Oversize, hardback, slip-cased collections of these comics had been previously published in black & white by Cochran during the 1980s as "The Complete EC Library". This Library was then added to by Cochran/Gemstone with 2005's Picto-Fiction collection, comprising the EC comics: Confessions Illustrated, Crime Illustrated, Shock Illustrated and Terror Illustrated, along with "18 previously unseen stories, never published before".

== Full-color hardbacks ==
In 2006, Cochran and Gemstone began publication of a series of full-color EC Archives editions. Promising that "[e]ach EC Archive volume will reprint six complete issues (24 stories)", the first volumes of Weird Science and Shock Suspenstories both saw print in December 2006, with forewords from (respectively) EC fans George Lucas and Steven Spielberg. Ostensibly beginning to publish two volumes every two months, the schedule changed to one-per-month and recently one every couple of months.

In addition, "Deluxe" versions of Weird Science Vol.s 1 & 2 (both signed by artist Al Feldstein), Shock Suspenstories Vol. 1 and Tales From the Crypt Vol. 1 have been published.

== Reduction ==
In early 2009, the future of Gemstone Publishing was unclear, after reports of unpaid printing bills, particularly for the EC Archives. In April, Geppi responded to the uncertainty, noting that while there had been "a reduction in staff at Gemstone", such moves did "not [signal] the end of Gemstone Publishing". Seven months after Geppi's optimistic statements, the last batch of Gemstone's Disney comics appeared in November 2008, complete with previews for next month's issues that Gemstone failed to publish. BOOM! Kids acquired all comic publishing licenses regarding Disney characters, and started publishing comic titles previously owned by Gemstone in the second half of 2009. In 2013, Dark Horse comics began to reprint E.C. comics picking up where Gemstone left off, in the same full color hardback format.
