= Shock Illustrated =

American magazine

- Rudy Nappi cover, issue #3

Publication information
- Publisher: EC Comics
- Schedule: Quarterly
- Format: Anthology
- Publication date: September/October 1955 - Spring 1956
- No. of issues: 3

Creative team
- Created by: William Gaines; Al Feldstein

Shock Illustrated is an American black and white magazine published by EC Comics from late 1955 to early 1956. Part of EC's Picto-Fiction line, each magazine featured three to five stories. The artists drew one to four panels per page with the text overlaid onto the artwork. The first issue appeared with a cover date of September–October 1955 and featured three psychology-themed stories, similar in theme to the comic Psychoanalysis published by EC in 1955. Starting with the second issue this type of story was generally reduced to one per issue, with the remaining stories being similar in theme to those that appeared in EC's comic Shock SuspenStories.

Shock Illustrated ran for a total of three issues. The Picto-Fiction magazines lost money from the start, and when EC's distributor went bankrupt, the company had no choice but to cancel the prints. The third issue of this magazine is known as the rarest EC publication of all time. Although all 250,000 copies had been printed, publisher Bill Gaines lacked the funds to bind them, and all but 100 copies were destroyed.

== Contributors ==
The editor of Shock Illustrated was Al Feldstein. In addition to those stories credited to him, Feldstein also wrote under the pseudonym Alfred E. Neuman. Feldstein included multiple retellings of previous stories, a move suggested by Gaines. This included "A Question of Time" and "Dead Right" in the second issue and "Curiosity Killed" in the third issue. Contributing writers included Jack Oleck (who had worked as a writer on EC's earlier publications), Robert Bernstein, John Larner, and Daniel Keyes (using the pseudonyms Kris Daniels and A.D. Locke).

Artists featured in Shock Illustrated included Jack Kamen, Rudy Nappi, Reed Crandall, George Evans, Al Williamson, Angelo Torres and Graham Ingels.

== Reprints ==
Shock Illustrated was reprinted along with the other Picto-Fiction magazines in hardbound volumes by Russ Cochran (and Gemstone Publishing) for the first time in 2006 as the final part of his Complete EC Library. With these reprints, published for the first time, was the fourth issue of the title which had been produced but never printed. Dark Horse reprinted Shock Illustrated as part of the EC Archives series in 2021.

== Issue guide ==
#	Date	Cover Artist	Story	Story Artist	Story Writer
1	Oct 1955	Jack Kamen	The Needle	Jack Kamen	Kris Daniels
1	Oct 1955	Jack Kamen	Switch Party	Jack Kamen	Robert Bernstein
1	Oct 1955	Jack Kamen	The Jacket	Jack Kamen	A.D. Locke
2	Feb 1956	Rudy Nappi	The Lipstick Killer	Reed Crandall	A.D. Locke
2	Feb 1956	Rudy Nappi	My Brother's Keeper	George Evans	Jack Oleck
2	Feb 1956	Rudy Nappi	A Question of Time	Al Williamson & Angelo Torres	Al Feldstein
2	Feb 1956	Rudy Nappi	Dead Right	Graham Ingels	Alfred E. Neuman
3	May 1956	Rudy Nappi	Curiosity Killed	Reed Crandall	Al Feldstein
3	May 1956	Rudy Nappi	The Demon	Graham Ingels	John Larner
3	May 1956	Rudy Nappi	Sin Doll	Jack Kamen	Kris Daniels
3	May 1956	Rudy Nappi	One Man's Meat	George Evans	Jack Oleck

== See also ==
- Terror Illustrated
