= George Evans (cartoonist) =

American cartoonist (1920–2001)

- In this self-portrait, George Evans holds a Secret Agent Corrigan comic strip.
- Born: George R. Evans; February 5, 1920 Harwood, Pennsylvania, U.S.
- Died: June 22, 2001 (aged 81)
- Area: Penciller

George Evans art print, Death of an Ace (1977)

George R. Evans (February 5, 1920 – June 22, 2001) was an American cartoonist and illustrator who worked in both comic books and comic strips. His lifelong fascination with airplanes and the pioneers of early aviation was a constant theme in his art and stories.

== Early life ==
Born in Harwood, Pennsylvania, Evans studied art from a correspondence course. He was still in his teens when he made his first sales, both illustrations and writing, to pulp magazines. Early in World War II, Evans was an aircraft mechanic at Shaw Field in South Carolina, where he sometimes flew in the planes he had worked on. He studied at the Scranton Art School and then entered the Army.

== Career ==
=== Comic books ===
In the post-World War II years, Evans began working for comic books, including an in-house staff position at Fiction House until 1949. Originally hired to rule panel borders, erase pencils and fill in blacks for other illustrators, he sat next the teenaged artist Frank Frazetta. Evans eventually got up the nerve to show his portfolio to the editor where the surprised staffer exclaimed, "What the hell are you doing this job for, when you can draw like this?" After that, Evans was given feature stories to draw in 1947. Among the features he illustrated were "The Lost World in Planet Comics and "Tigerman" in Rangers Comics. His favorite work from this period was for Fiction House's Wings Comics and he did a few illustrations for the company's pulp line as well. He picked up odd jobs while still attending art classes, including some farmed out to him by Better Publications' art editor Graham Ingels, who would later join Evans at Fiction House and at EC Comics. Evans' titles for Fawcett included the When Worlds Collide film adaptation and the Captain Video television adaptation, plus horror stories for Strange Suspense Stories, This Magazine Is Haunted, and Worlds of Fear. He contributed to the company's westerns and romance titles as well. Until the end of his life, Evans believed his work for Fawcett was better than any other in his career. He liked the people there and assembled a team of inkers and assistants after becoming one of Fawcett's top illustrators in 1950.

His work for EC Comics in the early 1950s included powerful covers and crime stories for Crime SuspenStories and memorable World War I aviation covers and stories for Aces High. He was a semi-regular contributor to The Haunt of Fear, Tales From the Crypt, Vault of Horror, Frontline Combat, Two-Fisted Tales and Shock SuspenStories (the latter of which also had three covers by Evans). Evans' shocking cover for Crime Suspenstories #23 was held up at the Senate Hearings On Juvenile Delinquency in 1954, among many other comic book covers from a variety of publishers. He stayed with EC through their new direction and Picto-Fiction experiments, contributing to M.D., Impact, Piracy, Terror Illustrated, Crime Illustrated and Shock Illustrated, among others. After EC, he contributed to Gilberton's Classics Illustrated, Dell and Gold Key. His books for Classics Illustrated included Romeo and Juliet (No. 134, September 1956); Lord Jim (No. 136, January 1957); The Little Savage (No. 137, March 1957); In the Reign of Terror (No. 139, July 1957); The Crisis (No. 145, July 1958); The Buccaneer (No. 148, January 1959); The Three Musketeers (No. 1, revised, May 1959); The Hunchback of Notre Dame (No. 18, revised, with Reed Crandall, Fall 1960); Oliver Twist (No. 23, revised, with Reed Crandall, Fall 1961); Julius Caesar (No. 68, revised, with Reed Crandall, 1962); and In Freedom's Cause (No. 168, with Reed Crandall, 1962; published UK 1963; published US 1969).

=== Comic strips ===
For Boys' Life Evans drew Space Conquerors! for the August 1953-March 1958 issues. During the 1960s, he was an assistant and ghost artist for George Wunder on the comic strip Terry and the Pirates. He did occasional work in comic books during this period, most notably for Warren's Blazing Combat black and white magazine and Eerie, Gold Key's The Twilight Zone and Ripley's Believe It or Not! During the 1970s, he contributed comics to the National Lampoon. He drew DC Comics' war comics and mystery tales, and for Marvel Comics he did mystery-horror stories plus work on two issues of Super-Villain Team-Up featuring Doctor Doom and Sub-Mariner. Al Williamson passed Secret Agent Corrigan on to Evans in 1980, and the strip ended with his 1996 retirement. For several years before that, the strip, as with all story strips, was becoming less popular. As the strip's circulation dwindled, the syndicate was about to cancel it in 1991. Originally, Evans had been glad, and had taken on other work. Then Evans was lured back, because it turned out that the strip's popularity in European markets justified keeping it going for five more years.

=== Aviation art ===
George Evans in 1953 at work on "Frank Luke!" for Frontline Combat #13 (July–August 1953).

Evans' first love was World War I aviation, and he did many paintings of World War I dogfights, including a calendar for The Cross and Cockade Society. He also did book jacket art. For David Manning White's Marlborough House, Evans created the cover illustration for The Black Swallow of Death: The Incredible Story of Eugene Jacques Bullard, The World's First Black Combat Aviator by P.J. Carisella, James W. Ryan and Edward W. Brooke (1972). This illustration is on display at the National Museum of the United States Air Force near Dayton, Ohio.

=== Books and later career ===
He illustrated a children's book, The Story of Flight, for Random House. The last page, which shows a man flying with a rocket pack, shows the rear of the Evans family home with Evans working at his drawing board in an upstairs window. In 1975, the hardcover novel Far Lands, Other Days contained many Evans black-and-white illustrations and a painted cover. In the 1990s, Factoid Books (a DC offshoot) released its Big Book of... series in which Evans drew some of his last comics: one a biography of baseball great Ty Cobb, another the story of the first air mail flight; and in 1998, the life of Judge Roy Bean in The Big Book of the Weird, Wild West. Along with many other former EC artists and similar talents, he contributed many illustrations to at least nine of the 18 volumes of Art Linkletter's Picture Encyclopedia for Boys and Girls. He was commissioned to do storyboards for the film Jaws 3-D.

George was also very active in the activities of the US Branch of the Western Front Association (WFA). This group focuses study and research on the 1914-1918 Western Front. Meetings are in the Baltimore - Philadelphia region. He religiously attended meetings, made presentations, and offered his expertise on all things aviation and art related. He once told WFA member Eric Miller that after he died he wanted his ashes brought to the WFA seminars. His passion burned brightly even as his mortal strength declined.

== Death ==
Evans, who in 1982 was living in Levittown, New York, on Long Island, had moved to Mount Joy, Pennsylvania, before he died at age 81. His final work was the Flash Gordon Sunday page of 21 January 2001.

== See also ==
- List of illustrators
