= Crime Illustrated =

American magazine

- 1st issue (November-December 1955), cover art by Joe Orlando

Publication information
- Publisher: EC Comics
- Schedule: Quarterly
- Format: Anthology
- Publication date: November/December 1955 - Spring 1956
- No. of issues: Two

Creative team
- Created by: William Gaines, Al Feldstein

Crime Illustrated is a black-and-white magazine published by EC Comics in late 1955 and early 1956. Part of EC's Picto-Fiction line, each magazine featured three to five stories. The format alternated panels of typography with panels of illustrations. Thus, it was arranged in tiers like a comic book but eliminated hand-lettering, balloons and panel borders.

The first issue appeared with a cover date of November–December 1955. Crime Illustrated ran for a total of two issues. The Picto-Fiction magazines lost money from the start, and when EC's distributor went bankrupt, they had no choice but to cancel them.

== Writers ==
The editor of Crime Illustrated was Al Feldstein. As with EC's comics, Feldstein was the most prolific writer of this title, and generally wrote up to three stories per issue. In addition to stories credited to him, Feldstein also wrote using the pseudonyms Maxwell Williams and Alfred E. Neuman. In a move suggested by publisher William Gaines, Feldstein included retellings of previous stories: the first issue's "Fall Guy for Murder" and "Mother's Day", and the second issue's "Screenplay for Murder" and "Pieces of Hate". Writers included Jack Oleck (who had contributed to EC's earlier publications), Richard Smith and John Larner.

== Artists ==
Artists featured in Crime Illustrated include Joe Orlando, Bernard Krigstein, Reed Crandall, Graham Ingels, George Evans, Jack Davis and Johnny Craig.

== Reprints ==
Crime Illustrated was reprinted along with the other Picto-Fiction magazines in hardbound volumes by Russ Cochran (and Gemstone Publishing) in 2006 as part of his Complete EC Library. These reprints also included the first-time publication of the third issue (assembled in 1956 but never published by EC). Dark Horse reprinted Crime Illustrated as part of the EC Archives series in 2022.

== Issue guide ==
#	Date	Cover Artist	Story	Story Artist	Story Writer
1	Dec 1955	Joe Orlando	Fall Guy for Murder	Bernard Krigstein & Reed Crandall	Al Feldstein
			The Sisters	Joe Orlando	Jack Oleck
			Fool's Gold	Graham Ingels	Richard Smith
			Farewell to Arms	Reed Crandall	John Larner
			Mother's Day	George Evans	Alfred E. Neuman
2	April 1956	Reed Crandall	Motive	Reed Crandall	Jack Oleck
			Fair Trade	Graham Ingels	John Larner
			Clean Sweep	Joe Orlando	Maxwell Williams
			Screenplay for Murder	Jack Davis	Al Feldstein
			Pieces of Hate	Johnny Craig	Alfred E. Neuman
