= Gunfighter (comics) =

Publication information
- Publisher: EC Comics
- Schedule: Bi-monthly
- Format: Western fiction
- Publication date: 1948 - 1950
- No. of issues: 9 (issues #5–13)

Creative team
- Created by: William Gaines; Al Feldstein
- Written by: Bill Gaines; Al Feldstein

Gunfighter is a comic that was published by EC Comics from 1948 to 1950, with a total of nine issues. It was part of EC's Pre-"trend comics" era.

== Publication history ==
Gunfighter (renamed from Fat and Slat, four issues), was a comic based on western/crime stories. The comic ran for nine issues, but was then later renamed again to The Haunt of Fear.
