= Aces High (comics) =

Comic book series by EC Comics

- George Evans cover, issue #1

Publication information
- Publisher: EC Comics
- Schedule: Bimonthly
- Format: Anthology
- Publication date: March/April 1955 - November/December 1955
- No. of issues: 5

Creative team
- Created by: William Gaines; Al Feldstein

Aces High is a comic book series published by EC Comics in 1955 as the fourth title in its New Direction line. The bi-monthly comic was published by Bill Gaines. It lasted a total of five issues before being cancelled, along with EC's other New Direction comics.

Aces High was dedicated to tales of air combat and front line service of Allied airmen during World War I and World War II. Many of the stories were in an anti-war vein.

Contributors to Aces High include George Evans, Wally Wood, Jack Davis and Bernie Krigstein.

Aces High was reprinted as part of publisher Russ Cochran's Complete EC Library in 1988. Between April and August 1999, Cochran (in association with Gemstone Publishing) reprinted all five individual issues. This complete run was later rebound, with covers included, in a single softcover EC Annual. Dark Horse reprinted Aces High as part of the EC Archives series in 2017.

== Issues ==
#	Date	Story	Story Artist
1	March/April 1955	The Way It Was	George Evans
1	March/April 1955	The Outsider	Wally Wood
1	March/April 1955	The Mascot	Bernard Krigstein
1	March/April 1955	The New C.O.	Jack Davis
2	May/June 1955	Chivalry!	George Evans
2	May/June 1955	Revenge	Bernard Krigstein
2	May/June 1955	Locker 9	Wally Wood
2	May/June 1955	Footnote	Jack Davis
3	July/August 1955	The Rules	George Evans
3	July/August 1955	The Spy	Bernard Krigstein
3	July/August 1955	Greasemonkey	Wally Wood
3	July/August 1955	The Case of Champagne	Jack Davis
4	September/October 1955	The Green Kids	George Evans
4	September/October 1955	The Good Luck Piece	Bernard Krigstein
4	September/October 1955	The Novice and the Ace	Wally Wood
4	September/October 1955	Home Again	Jack Davis
5	November/December 1955	C'est la Guerre!	George Evans
5	November/December 1955	Iron Man!	Jack Davis
5	November/December 1955	Spads were Trump	Bernard Krigstein
5	November/December 1955	Ordeal	Wally Wood
