= The Haunt of Fear =

American horror comic anthology series

- The Haunt of Fear #16 (2) (July/Aug 1950); Cover art by Johnny Craig

Publication information
- Publisher: EC Comics
- Schedule: Bi-monthly
- Format: Anthology
- Publication date: May/June 1950 – November/December 1954
- No. of issues: 28
- Main character(s): The Old Witch; The Crypt-Keeper; The Vault-Keeper

Creative team
- Created by: Bill Gaines; Al Feldstein

The Haunt of Fear is an American bi-monthly horror comic anthology series that was published by EC Comics from 1950 to 1954 created by Bill Gaines and Al Feldstein. The magazine began in June 1947 as Fat and Slat. It continued under this title for four issues before becoming Gunfighter (#5–14). It was retitled The Haunt of Fear with issue #15 (1) (May/June 1950). The numbering was reset after #17 (3). The comic bore this title for 28 issues until being discontinued after issue #28 (November/December 1954).

Along with Tales from the Crypt and The Vault of Horror, it formed a trifecta of popular EC horror anthologies. Publication ceased, however, after horror and crime comics came under scrutiny for an alleged link to juvenile delinquency and the subsequent imposition of a highly restrictive Comics Code.

The Haunt of Fear has since been reprinted in single issues and collected volumes. Some of its stories were adapted for the 1972 motion picture Tales from the Crypt and television's Tales from the Crypt, which aired on HBO from 1989 to 1996.

== Production history ==
=== Original run ===
In 1950, EC Comics publisher Bill Gaines and his editor, Al Feldstein, began experimenting with horror tales in their crime titles, War Against Crime and Crime Patrol. An EC Western comic called Gunfighter, which had previously run for five issues as the comedy Fat & Slat, became The Haunt of Fear with issue #15 (1) (May/June 1950). Due to an attempt to save money on second-class postage permits, characteristic of comics publishing in the era, the numbering did not change along with the titles. However, numbering for the magazine was reset after #17 (3) due to a request by the United States Post Office that the fourth issue under the new title be numbered accordingly.

The Haunt of Fear continued to run for a total of 28 issues before ceasing publication with issue #28 (November/December 1954). Along with its sister titles, Tales from the Crypt and The Vault of Horror, The Haunt of Fear was popular, but in the late 1940s and early 1950s comic books came under attack from parents, clergymen, schoolteachers, and others who believed the magazines contributed to illiteracy and juvenile delinquency. In April and June 1954, highly publicized congressional subcommittee hearings on the effects of comic books upon children left the industry shaken. With the subsequent imposition of a highly restrictive Comics Code, which placed severe restrictions on violent comic book genres, including forbidding publishers from using the words "terror" and "horror" in titles and from depicting zombies, werewolves, gruesome characters, and outrè horror fiction trappings, EC Comics publisher Bill Gaines cancelled The Haunt of Fear and its two companion horror titles.

=== Reprints ===
The Haunt of Fear has been reprinted on numerous occasions. Ballantine Books reprinted selected stories in a series of paperback anthologies from 1964 to 1966. The magazine was fully collected in a series of five black-and-white hardbacks by publisher Russ Cochran as part of The Complete EC Library in 1985. Cochran also reprinted several issues in a standard comic book format during the early 1990s in association with Gladstone Publishing. He eventually reprinted the entire series with Gemstone Publishing from 1992 to 1998. This complete run was later rebound, with covers included, in a series of six softcover EC Annuals. Cochran and Gemstone planned to publish hardcover, re-colored volumes of The Haunt of Fear as part of the EC Archives series, until Gemstone's financial troubles left this project in limbo. The series was revived by GC Press, a boutique imprint established by Cochran and Grant Geissman, and the first volume (of a projected five) was released in 2012. Dark Horse Comics took over publication of the remainder of the series from 2015 to 2018. The complete five-volume series was later republished as over-sized trade paperbacks from 2021 to 2025.

== Production ==
=== Creative team ===
Gaines and Feldstein were responsible for writing all the stories until the end of 1953. An unauthorized adaptation of Ray Bradbury's work in another of EC's comics eventually led to a series of authorized Bradbury adaptations. Features included "Grim Fairy Tales", horror-based parodies of well-known fairy tales such as "Sleeping Beauty" and "Hansel and Gretel". The parodies began appearing in issue #15 (September/October 1952).

Artist Graham Ingels took over the art duties of The Haunt of Fear starting with issue #4 (November/December 1950). He became the Old Witch's primary artist for the remainder of the comic's run, though his art had been appearing since the second issue. Ingels later took over cover art duty with issue #11 (January/February 1952). Other artists who contributed to the title were Feldstein, Johnny Craig, Wally Wood, Harvey Kurtzman, Jack Davis, George Roussos, Harry Harrison, Joe Orlando, Sid Check, George Evans, Reed Crandall, Jack Kamen, and Bernard Krigstein. Ingels' artwork on the eight-page lead stories and his splash pages, particularly on issues #14 and #17, set a new standard for horror illustration.

Among the title's most controversial stories was "Foul Play" (#19, May/June 1953), written by Feldstein and drawn by Davis. It featured a crooked baseball player being dismembered, with his body parts used to play baseball by his murderers. The story was singled out by Robert Warshow in his 1954 essay "Paul, the Horror Comics, and Dr. Wertham". He described it as "the outer limits of... 'good taste'." It was also one of many examples used by Fredric Wertham in his book Seduction of the Innocent. Author Grant Geissman used the title of the story for his book on EC artists, Foul Play (2005).

=== Influences and adaptations ===
As with the other EC comics edited by Feldstein, the stories in this comic were primarily based on Gaines using existing horror stories and films to develop "springboards" from which he and Feldstein could launch new stories. Specific story influences that have been identified include the following:

- "The Wall" (#15 (1)): Edgar Allan Poe's "The Black Cat" and "The Tell-Tale Heart"
- "Television Terror" (#17 (2)): H. Russell Wakefield's "Ghost Hunt"
- "Monster Maker" (#17 (2)): James Whale's Frankenstein
- "The Hunchback" (#4): Robert Bloch's "The Mannikin"
- "Horror in the Freak Tent" (#5): Tod Browning's Freaks
- "A Strange Undertaking" (#6): Ray Bradbury's "The Handler"
- "The Basket" (#7): Robert Bloch's "The Mannikin"
- "Horror in the Schoolroom" (#7): John Collier's "Thus I Refute Beelzy"
- "Hounded to Death" (#8): Maurice Level's "The Kennel"
- "Irony of Death" (#8): Bram Stoker's "The Squaw"
- "Warts So Horrible?" (#9): Mark Twain's The Adventures of Tom Sawyer
- "Forbidden Fruit" (#9): William Hope Hodgson's "The Voice in the Night"
- "The Gorilla's Paw" (#9): W. W. Jacobs's "The Monkey's Paw"
- "Grave Business" (#10): Louis Pollock's "Breakdown"
- "Ship-Shape" (#14): William Hope Hodgson's "The Derelict"
- "House of Horror" (#15): Bennett Cerf's Try and Stop Me
- "Nobody There" (#16): Ralph Murphy's The Man in Half Moon Street
- "Thump Fun" (#20): Edgar Allan Poe's "The Tell-Tale Heart"
- "Hyde and Go Shriek" (#20): Robert Louis Stevenson's Strange Case of Dr Jekyll and Mr Hyde
- "Wish You Were Here" (#22): W. W. Jacobs's "The Monkey's Paw"
- "Model Nephew" (#22): H. P. Lovecraft's "The Terrible Old Man"

After their unauthorized adaptation of one of Ray Bradbury's stories in another magazine, Bradbury contacted EC about their plagiarism of his work. They reached an agreement for EC to do authorized versions of Bradbury's short fiction. These official adaptations include:

- "The Coffin" (#16)
- "The Black Ferris" (#18)

== The Old Witch ==
The Old Witch as drawn by Graham Ingels

Although EC's horror stable consisted of three separate magazines, there was little beyond their titles to distinguish them from one another. Each magazine had its own host, known as a GhouLunatic. The Old Witch was the primary host of The Haunt of Fear. Hosting duties for any one magazine were typically shared with the hosts of the other two. For example, a single issue of The Haunt of Fear would contain two stories told by the Old Witch, one by the Crypt-Keeper (of Tales from the Crypt) and one by the Vault-Keeper (of The Vault of Horror). The professional rivalry among these three GhouLunatics was often played for comedic effect in the letter column.

The Old Witch was the last of the three to make her appearance. She was introduced in the second issue of the magazine, #16 (2) (July/August 1950), in a segment titled "The Witch's Cauldron" in which the Old Witch introduces herself in a story drawn by artist Jack Kamen. The third issue featured a Johnny Craig cover depicting the three GhoulLunatics stepping out of doorways and launched a letter column, "The Old Witch's Niche." Thereafter, the Old Witch presided over the magazine as its comedic horror host, delivering an irreverent and pun-filled commentary to lighten the horrific tone of the stories she introduced. In spite of her late start, the Old Witch would prove to be the most visible of the GhoulLunatics in their initial run. Not only did she appear in virtually every issue of The Haunt of Fear, Tales From The Crypt, and The Vault of Horror, she also appeared in the final story in each issue of Crime SuspenStories from #3 through #16. Occasionally, the Old Witch would appear as a character as well. A personal account of the circumstances surrounding her birth are related in "A Little Stranger!" (The Haunt of Fear #14), and "Horror Beneath the Streets" (The Haunt of Fear #17) tells how she and her fellow GhouLunatics got their EC publishing contracts. The character was inspired by Old Nancy, the Witch of Salem, host of Alonzo Deen Cole's radio series, The Witch's Tale, which aired from 1931 to 1938 on WOR, the Mutual Radio Network, and in syndication.

== List of issues ==
The Haunt of Fear issues
Issue #	Date	Cover artist	Story title	Story artist	Summary (GhouLunatic host)
15 (1)	May/Jun 1950	Johnny Craig	The Wall	Johnny Craig	A man finds his wife's love for her cat, Snooky, unbearable, and finally decides to take care of the problem once and for all, but soon finds he is slowly slipping into insanity when his imagination gets the best of him. (No host)
15 (1)	May/Jun 1950	Johnny Craig	House of Horror	Harvey Kurtzman	A fraternity initiation goes eerily wrong, when the initiates are told to walk through a supposedly haunted house... but never come out. (No host)
15 (1)	May/Jun 1950	Johnny Craig	The Mad Magician	Wally Wood & Harry Harrison	Boris Petaja, a skilled magician, begins to kidnap innocent townspeople to use in his experiments on a real "saw a man in two" trick but finally meets his match in a young couple he kidnaps. (No host)
15 (1)	May/Jun 1950	Johnny Craig	The Thing in the Swamp!	Al Feldstein	A swamp hermit relates a tale of a group of scientists that fed an amoeba that ate everything in its path to two boaters. It is just a myth... right? (No host)
16 (2)	July/Aug 1950	Johnny Craig	Vampire!	Johnny Craig	A doctor insists that the body he examined was killed by a vampire, but no one in town will believe him. So, he goes to the mansion where the body came from and finds that there is a vampire, but who is the vampire? (No host)
16 (2)	July/Aug 1950	Johnny Craig	Horror-Ahead!	Wally Wood	A shopkeeper tells a customer a story about his quest with his assistant to Africa to collect some real shrunken heads from a native tribe. When they are caught stealing, they learn a startling punishment. (No host)
16 (2)	July/Aug 1950	Johnny Craig	The Killer in the Coffin!	Graham Ingels	Ernest Parker grows tired of his nagging wife, Nan, and meets a younger woman named Faye. Together, they plan going away and getting married, but they have to get Nan out of the picture, so Ernest coughs up a plan to fake his death. (No host)
16 (2)	July/Aug 1950	Johnny Craig	The Mummy's Return!	Jack Kamen	Over a thousand years ago, a jealous pharaoh had one of his servants mummified after he fell in love with the girl the pharaoh loved. However, the girl discovered his plot and tried to revive him with a scribe, only to be offed by the king. In the present, three friends stumble upon the crypt and find that history has a nasty way of repeating itself. (The Old Witch)
17 (3)	Sept/Oct 1950	Johnny Craig	Nightmare!	Johnny Craig	A you-are-the-main-character story in which you are a man afflicted with recurring nightmares about being buried alive. Your psychiatrist assures you it is all in the mind but can you tell when your nightmares will begin to spill over into reality? (No host)
17 (3)	Sept/Oct 1950	Johnny Craig	Television Terror!	Harvey Kurtzman	An arrogant reporter does a story on a famous haunted house and learns the hard way that some things should just be left alone. (No host)
17 (3)	Sept/Oct 1950	Johnny Craig	Monster Maker!	Graham Ingels	Dr. Ravenscar, a disgraced surgeon, retreats to his family castle to plan his comeback. He wants to prove he can bring a man back from the dead, but things take a turn for the worse when he damages the corpse's brain and has to make a last-minute substitution. (No host)
17 (3)	Sept/Oct 1950	Johnny Craig	Horror Beneath the Streets!	Al Feldstein	The story of how Bill Gaines and Al Feldstein met the Crypt-Keeper, Vault-Keeper, and Old Witch in a sewer and were "persuaded" into giving them a publishing deal. (The Old Witch)
4	Nov/Dec 1950	Al Feldstein	The Hunchback!	Graham Ingels	Roger Compton goes to a small town to visit his old college friend, Peter, but finds that his old pal is now a feared recluse with a peculiar hump on his back and an even more peculiar taste for human flesh. (The Old Witch)
4	Nov/Dec 1950	Al Feldstein	The Tunnel of Terror!	Jack Kamen	A young woman takes her alcoholic, partying brother to Mexico for a relaxing vacation. When he disappears into an underground club and numerous bodies are found partially eaten, she decides to find him on her own. (The Vault-Keeper)
4	Nov/Dec 1950	Al Feldstein	The Living Mummy	Jack Davis	A group of scientists working on an experiment to raise a mummy back to life actually revive it, only to learn the true horror of the pharaoh's curse. (The Old Witch)
4	Nov/Dec 1950	Al Feldstein	Man from the Grave!	Wally Wood	Jon Wayland, a painter, returns from the grave to keep on painting for all of eternity after committing a crime against his friend. (The Crypt-Keeper)
5	Jan/Feb 1951	Johnny Craig	A Biting Finish!	Graham Ingels	A jealous man murders another man over a girl and buries him in an old graveyard. His secret soon comes out, and he is forced to hide in an old Civil War tunnel, a tunnel that leads him straight to a "biting finish". (The Old Witch)
5	Jan/Feb 1951	Johnny Craig	Horror in the Freak Tent!	Wally Wood	A crude, malicious circus owner mistreats and sabotages his circus freaks and employees until he blinds one of his famed attractions, then the tables are turned... (The Crypt-Keeper)
5	Jan/Feb 1951	Johnny Craig	A Tasty Morsel!	Jack Davis	You are a traveler seeking shelter in a commodious inn owned by an old, ugly man and find out he has a little secret that is just dying to come out. (The Old Witch)
5	Jan/Feb 1951	Johnny Craig	Seeds of Death!	Johnny Craig	A hobo finds a hand in the garbage at the city dump, a hand that belonged to an abusive man who murdered his wife's hired farmhand. (The Vault-Keeper)
6	Mar/Apr 1951	Johnny Craig	A Strange Undertaking...	Graham Ingels	Ezra, a vengeful caretaker decides to get back at his enemies when they die and are brought to his cemetery by desecrating their bodies and refusing to bury them until spring... but not if the dead have anything to say about it. (The Old Witch)
6	Mar/Apr 1951	Johnny Craig	So They Finally Pinned You Down!	Wally Wood	A man moves to a new town, meets a beautiful girl, and moves in with her. After being "drugged" by her and having severe blackouts, he sets out to get revenge. However, whenever he blackouts, a woman ends up dead. (The Vault-Keeper)
6	Mar/Apr 1951	Johnny Craig	A Grave Gag!	Jack Kamen	Jonah Westlake, the black sheep of the Westlake family, gets his kicks by playing practical jokes on his own kin, especially at funerals, but his latest joke may be his last. (The Old Witch)
6	Mar/Apr 1951	Johnny Craig	Cheese, That's Horrible!	Jack Davis	Bradbury Prince assists Henrick Villhem, the head owner of a cheese company, but when he refuses to tell Bradbury the secret ingredient, he decides to do away with Henrick. (The Crypt-Keeper)
7	May/Jun 1951	Johnny Craig	Room for One More!	Graham Ingels	Rodney Whitman was just a young boy when his parents died and he was sent to live with his uncaring aunt and uncle and their two mean sons. The only thing that kept him going was the thought of being buried with his family in the Whitman mausoleum, a mausoleum with just one more coffin, which Rodney is saving for himself at any cost. (The Old Witch)
7	May/Jun 1951	Johnny Craig	The Basket!	Jack Davis	A town is full of curiosity at a strange man who always carries a basket on his shoulder. The townspeople get the answers they have been searching for when they break into his house. (The Crypt-Keeper)
7	May/Jun 1951	Johnny Craig	Horror in the Schoolroom	Jack Kamen	A young boy's teacher does not believe the stories he comes up with about traveling with an imaginary monster named Magog, even when the boy tells him Magog will gobble him up for whipping him. The teacher should have heeded the warning. (The Old Witch)
7	May/Jun 1951	Johnny Craig	The Howling Banshee!	Johnny Craig	A retired mobster marries a superstitious Irish family who are convinced that a banshee wails prior to the death of one of their kin. (The Vault-Keeper)
8	July/Aug 1951	Al Feldstein	Hounded to Death!	Graham Ingels	A jealous husband keeps his wife locked up in their mansion like one of the numerous hounds he uses to hunt foxes. When she falls for another man, the husband decides to take care of the problem, only to find he is barking up the wrong tree. (The Old Witch)
8	July/Aug 1951	Al Feldstein	A Very Strange Mummy!	George Roussos	Three explorers travel to a cursed crypt rumored to hold an evil being, but when they venture inside they find a perfectly preserved mummy and soon find that he is not the only monster lurking about. (The Vault-Keeper)
8	July/Aug 1951	Al Feldstein	Diminishing Returns!	Edwin J. Smalle	Vincent Beardsley, a greedy New Yorker seeking the fourth tribal diamond for his collection, takes his friend to Ecuador to claim the gem. When they are caught by the tribe themselves, he gives up his "friend" to the vengeful tribesmen only to find he must face the ultimate consequence! (The Old Witch)
8	July/Aug 1951	Al Feldstein	The Irony of Death!	Jack Davis	Jeff Slag, a conniving young man working at an ironworks, marries his boss's daughter and then murders his boss in order to take over the plant only to find that there really is irony in death. (The Crypt-Keeper)
9	Sept/Oct 1951	Al Feldstein	Warts So Horrible?	Graham Ingels	Two men attempt to rob their wealthy uncle's grave as revenge for his not leaving them any of his money. They are witnessed by a pair of young boys who have gone to a graveyard to test out an old wives' remedy for removing warts—but is it just magic or can the boys really believe their eyes? (The Old Witch)
9	Sept/Oct 1951	Al Feldstein	Forbidden Fruit	Joe Orlando	A man and his secretary are marooned on a deserted island following a plane crash. They ignore a warning not to eat any fruit from the trees growing on the island, with consequences neither of them could have foreseen. (The Vault-Keeper)
9	Sept/Oct 1951	Al Feldstein	The Age-Old Story!	Jack Kamen	Gold-digging Harriet plans to ditch her elderly husband to move in with a younger lover, but her husband has one final surprise for her before she goes. (The Old Witch)
9	Sept/Oct 1951	Al Feldstein	The Gorilla's Paw!	Jack Davis	A man acquires a gorilla's mummified paw and discovers it can grant him anything he wishes. Unfortunately, he does not always think before he wishes aloud. (The Crypt-Keeper)
10	Nov/Dec 1951	Al Feldstein	Grave Business!	Graham Ingels	A greedy undertaker extorts money from the families of the dead by charging them for the most overpriced funerals possible. He finds the tables turned when he uncovers a previously hidden talent of his own for "playing dead." (The Old Witch)
10	Nov/Dec 1951	Al Feldstein	The Vamp!	Jack Davis & Johnny Craig	While on holiday, a man begins a flirtation with a beautiful yet mysterious woman; but notices that she tends to appear whenever there is a murder in the local area. (The Vault-Keeper)
10	Nov/Dec 1951	Al Feldstein	My Uncle Ekar!	Jack Kamen	An abandoned child is taken in by the police. He tells them about his "Uncle Ekar," who has three eyes, a forked tongue, and commits murders. The cops do not believe the boy's story... until they find a body exactly where he described it. (The Old Witch)
10	Nov/Dec 1951	Al Feldstein	Bum Steer!	Jack Davis	A washed-up bullfighter wants to get rid of a newcomer who has taken over both his spotlight and his sweetheart. The rival dies and so does the bull, but now they are both set on revenge. (The Crypt-Keeper)
11	Jan/Feb 1952	Graham Ingels	Ooze in the Cellar?	Graham Ingels	An elderly miser hoards treasures in his cellar and refuses to give anything to anybody. He insists that his wife save canned food rather than give it away, and when she is poisoned by a jar of rotted fruit, it and her body create a living ooze that soon swallows up the cellar and everything else in the house. (The Old Witch)
11	Jan/Feb 1952	Graham Ingels	The Acid Test!	Jack Kamen	Sylvia becomes so fed up with her fawning, over-devoted husband that she blinds him with sulphuric acid. He is so infatuated with her that at her trial he pleads for her to be released, but she had not considered that he might want justice outside of the law. (The Vault-Keeper)
11	Jan/Feb 1952	Graham Ingels	Extermination	George Roussos	A sadistic pest exterminator finds himself on the receiving end when he is surrounded by the creatures he once loved to torture. (The Old Witch)
11	Jan/Feb 1952	Graham Ingels	Ear Today... Gone Tomorrow!	Jack Davis	Two fertilizer salesmen face problems when no one will sell them the goods to fill a massive order for bone meal. They decide to use bones from the local cemetery despite stories about the cemetery being haunted but meet their comeuppance when their car breaks down near a cornfield. (The Crypt-Keeper)
12	Mar/Apr 1952	Graham Ingels	Poetic Justice!	Graham Ingels	A lonely old man is tormented mercilessly by a wealthy father and son who want him evicted from his house so they can build over the land. He is driven to suicide but returns from the grave one year later on the day he died—Valentine's Day. (The Old Witch)
12	Mar/Apr 1952	Graham Ingels	...On a Dead Man's Chest!	Johnny Craig	Unaware that his wife is having an affair with his younger brother, an old sailor decides to have a picture of the three of them together tattooed on his chest. He is murdered by his wife and brother, who try to cover up their crime, only to find there is one piece of "evidence" they cannot hide. (The Vault-Keeper)
12	Mar/Apr 1952	Graham Ingels	Till Death Do We Part!	Joe Orlando	Tommy and Ernie commit an armed robbery. Ernie is shot while escaping from the police and tries to send for help but no one will listen. (The Old Witch)
12	Mar/Apr 1952	Graham Ingels	What's Cookin'?	Jack Davis	Two failing restaurant owners manage to turn their business around with the help of a mysterious stranger. They become a roaring success, but when he demands half the profits, they decide to get him out of the way. Little do they know he has one more dish left to serve. (The Crypt-Keeper)
13	May/Jun 1952	Graham Ingels	For the Love of Death!	Graham Ingels	A lonely man decides to take the place of the corpse at a funeral so he can enjoy the eulogies and ceremony for the deceased. Assuming, of course, that he can get out of the coffin again... (The Old Witch)
13	May/Jun 1952	Graham Ingels	Fed Up!	Johnny Craig	A carnival sword-swallower pulls a unique trick on her husband when he spends all the money she was saving for a new sword on junk food for himself. (The Vault-Keeper)
13	May/Jun 1952	Graham Ingels	Minor Error!	Jack Kamen	A gang of neighborhood kids become friendly with a new boy in town. They believe his uncle is the vampire responsible for a string of strange killings nearby, but how much do they really know about vampires? (The Old Witch)
13	May/Jun 1952	Graham Ingels	Wolf Bait!	Jack Davis	In early 20th century Russia, some hunters are being pursued by a pack of ravenous wolves, and their sleigh is too heavy for them to escape. They soon run out of bullets and decide there is only one way out of the situation. (The Crypt-Keeper)
14	July/Aug 1952	Graham Ingels	A Little Stranger!	Graham Ingels	The Old Witch recounts the story of how her dead werewolf father and dead vampiress mother fell in love and brought her into the world. (The Old Witch)
14	July/Aug 1952	Graham Ingels	Take Your Pick!	Jack Kamen	Stuart Braden has always boasted about having a "heart of ice." His wife decides to make his words come ironically true after his brutal cruelty results in the deaths of his dog, his mother-in-law, and his former business partner. (The Vault-Keeper)
14	July/Aug 1952	Graham Ingels	Ship-Shape!	Sid Check	Four survivors of a plane crash are out at sea when they find an abandoned ship. They climb on board but the oozy, frightening substance that covers the ship does not want them to leave. (The Old Witch)
14	July/Aug 1952	Graham Ingels	This Little Piggy...	Jack Davis	During the rule of the British Raj in India, the grandson of an English governor is banned from hunting wild boar because the local tribesmen consider them sacred. He is determined to bring home the head of a boar as a trophy but is unaware of just how far the tribesmen will go to stop him. (The Crypt-Keeper)
15	Sept/Oct 1952	Graham Ingels	Chatter-Boxed!	Graham Ingels	An elderly man begins to suffer from catalepsy, which makes him appear to be dead when he is not. He leaves instructions to be buried with a telephone if he "dies", just in case he is not really dead. There is no way this plan could go wrong, or so he thinks. (The Old Witch)
15	Sept/Oct 1952	Graham Ingels	All Washed Up!	George Evans	Harry kills his wealthy love rival and decides to steal the corpse's ring so he can sell it and use the money to marry his sweetheart. But when trying to dispose of the body in a well, he drops the ring, too, and now he is going to have to go down and get it... (The Vault-Keeper)
15	Sept/Oct 1952	Graham Ingels	Marriage Vows!	Jack Kamen	A king agrees to marry off his daughter to the ruler of a neighbouring kingdom so they can obtain a loan and refill the royal treasury. The princess is unhappy and wants to marry Prince Dashing instead, but then she remembers that she only agreed to give her hand in marriage. (The Old Witch)
15	Sept/Oct 1952	Graham Ingels	Death of Some Salesmen!	Jack Davis	A door-to-door salesman gets more than he bargained for when he goes to the home of a couple who like to test out the product in advance. (The Crypt-Keeper)
16	Nov/Dec 1952	Graham Ingels	Nobody There!	Graham Ingels	A prominent surgeon has spent his life repeatedly forcing a younger subordinate to perform a horrific operation that keeps the old man looking young, but what will happen when he refuses to take continue taking orders? (The Old Witch)
16	Nov/Dec 1952	Graham Ingels	A Creep in the Deep!	George Evans	Philip is devastated after his wife disappears during a fishing trip to their cabin. When he tries to sell the cabin, no one will buy it because of the strange murders that have started happening around the lake. (The Vault-Keeper)
16	Nov/Dec 1952	Graham Ingels	...From Hunger!	Jack Kamen	A royal chef is driven insane by the king, who is so gluttonous that he leaves no food for his subjects. There is only one thing to do with a nice big pig... (The Old Witch)
16	Nov/Dec 1952	Graham Ingels	The Coffin!	Jack Davis	Richard Braling's terminally ill brother is an inventor who seems determined to build a coffin for himself before he dies. Richard cannot see anything special about the mechanical coffin, but when he tries to examine it so he can patent his late brother's invention, he discovers that all is not as it seems. (The Crypt-Keeper)
17	Jan/Feb 1953	Graham Ingels	Horror We? How's Bayou?	Graham Ingels	In a swamp, a man waits to lure victims for his insane serial-killer brother. He likes to get rid of the bodies by throwing them into the marsh, but what he does not know is that this might not be the end of them. (The Old Witch)
17	Jan/Feb 1953	Graham Ingels	Gorilla My Dreams!	George Evans	You are a man who is abducted by a mad scientist and whose brain is transplanted into the body of an escaped gorilla. (The Vault-Keeper)
17	Jan/Feb 1953	Graham Ingels	A Likely Story!	Jack Kamen	A cantankerous queen terrorizes the staff who work in the royal household. Nobody's work can ever please her, until a painter comes up with a clever way to ensure the queen's official portrait will turn out just right. (The Old Witch)
17	Jan/Feb 1953	Graham Ingels	Garden Party!	Jack Davis	Geoffrey drives his wife Louella crazy by trampling all over her beloved garden. He discovers just how crazy Louella can be when he and his friends hold a raucous barbecue that destroys the lawn. (The Crypt-Keeper)
18	Mar/Apr 1953	Graham Ingels	Pipe Down!	Graham Ingels	A woman and her lover come up with a plan to dispatch her elderly, crippled husband. They succeed in making the murder look like an accidental death, but a new pet in the house is a little more suspicious. (The Old Witch)
18	Mar/Apr 1953	Graham Ingels	Bedtime Gory!	George Evans	On the eve of her corrupt, blackmailing husband's promotion to company president, an abused wife gives him a little surprise in the form of a new bed. (The Vault-Keeper)
18	Mar/Apr 1953	Graham Ingels	Pot-Shot!	Jack Kamen	A spoiled young nobleman who loves to drive at high speed devises an ingenious way to get an increase in his allowance from his wealthy father. It turns out to be his undoing in a more literal way than he could have imagined. (The Old Witch)
18	Mar/Apr 1953	Graham Ingels	The Black Ferris!	Jack Davis	Two young boys discover a sinister secret about the man who runs the ferris wheel down at the local carnival. Written by Ray Bradbury. (The Crypt-Keeper)
19	May/Jun 1953	Graham Ingels	Sucker Bait!	Graham Ingels	A brilliant young chemist on leave from university comes up with a plan to lure and kill the vampire that is terrorising the town but finds that the vampire is a little too close to home. (The Old Witch)
19	May/Jun 1953	Graham Ingels	Lover, Come Hack to Me!	George Evans	A couple on their honeymoon encounter a storm on the road and are forced to stop in an abandoned house, where the groom discovers a shocking skeleton in his new family's closet. (The Vault-Keeper)
19	May/Jun 1953	Graham Ingels	Double-Header!	Jack Kamen	In a fictional European kingdom, three jealous ladies of the royal court conspire to usurp the new queen by exposing her as an adulteress. The king, however, does not hold the witnesses blameless. (The Old Witch)
19	May/Jun 1953	Graham Ingels	Foul Play!	Jack Davis	Baseball players take deadly revenge on a corrupt rival found to have fatally poisoned a player from the opposing team. (The Crypt-Keeper)
20	July/Aug 1953	Graham Ingels	Thump Fun!	Graham Ingels	A jealous man kills his brother for money and is suddenly tormented by the sound of a heartbeat. He thinks back to "The Tell-Tale Heart" by Edgar Allan Poe and believes the thumping sound is all in his mind. When the local police show up to his house, he soon finds out just how wrong he was. (The Old Witch)
20	July/Aug 1953	Graham Ingels	Terror Train	Al Feldstein	Gloria is convinced her husband Ralph is trying to kill her, so she runs off and boards a train. To her surprise, Ralph keeps popping up everywhere she looks, even in a lonely cabin that contains a single open coffin. Reprinted from The Vault of Horror #12 (Apr/May 1950). (The Vault-Keeper)
20	July/Aug 1953	Graham Ingels	Bloody Sure	Reed Crandall	A man laughs off the townspeople who are convinced his new bride is a vampiress, but just how can he be so sure? (The Old Witch)
20	July/Aug 1953	Graham Ingels	Hyde and Go Shriek!	Jack Davis	Myron and his girlfriend hatch a scheme to fleece her eccentric employer by pretending to create a potion to turn him into his hero: the villainous Edward Hyde. The old story turns out to be more true than they thought. (The Crypt-Keeper)
21	Sept/Oct 1953	Graham Ingels	An Off-Color Heir	Graham Ingels	Newly married Laura has learned to handle her suspicions about her husband's long business trips and the mysterious locked room in his house. However, there is something she cannot put her finger on about the portrait of Baron Gilles de Rais that hangs in the hallway. (The Old Witch)
21	Sept/Oct 1953	Graham Ingels	Dig That Cat... He's Real Gone!	Jack Davis	A homeless man receives a partial brain transplant from a cat. He capitalizes on his newly acquired "nine lives" by becoming a star performance artist whose specialty involves cheating death, but his time may be running out faster than he thinks. (The Crypt-Keeper)
21	Sept/Oct 1953	Graham Ingels	Corker!	Jack Kamen & Bill Elder	Believing she is possessed by a demon, a woman seeks the advice of the fortune teller who first encouraged her interest in witchcraft. Her fiancé will have none of it—should he have listened to her? (The Old Witch)
21	Sept/Oct 1953	Graham Ingels	The High Cost of Dying!	Reed Crandall	In 19th-century France, Henri has 24 hours to raise the money to bury his dead wife due to an ordinance from the town council, otherwise the Commissioner of Health will hand the body over for dissection by medical students and pocket a financial bonus. Thankfully, Henri and the commissioner reach an agreement. (The Vault-Keeper)
22	Nov/Dec 1953	Graham Ingels	Wish You Were Here	Graham Ingels	A couple facing bankruptcy discover that the statue they bought from a mysterious store can grant them three wishes. When the first wish goes tragically wrong, they are reminded of the old story of "The Monkey's Paw" and soon find life imitating art. (The Old Witch)
22	Nov/Dec 1953	Graham Ingels	Chess-Mate	George Evans	Townspeople try to convince an eccentric local genius to take part in a chess tournament that will put their town on the map, but he has a sinister secret that may foil their plans. (The Vault-Keeper)
22	Nov/Dec 1953	Graham Ingels	Snow White and the Seven Dwarfs	Jack Kamen	A gruesome re-imagining of the "Snow White" fairy tale. (The Old Witch)
22	Nov/Dec 1953	Graham Ingels	Model Nephew	Jack Davis	Sidney was always eager to know how his wealthy, stingy old uncle had made his beloved ship in a bottle. After murdering his uncle to claim an inheritance, Sidney realizes just how many secrets the model is hiding. (The Crypt-Keeper)
23	Jan/Feb 1954	Graham Ingels	Creep Course	Graham Ingels	Stella's history professor has a special interest in ancient Rome. After she attempts to seduce him to get better grades, she finds she in for more than she expected. (The Old Witch)
23	Jan/Feb 1954	Graham Ingels	No Silver Atoll!	George Evans	Lovers Ruth and Clark are caught in a plane crash and stranded on a small island with the remaining survivors. Possessions containing silver start to go missing, mutilated bodies turn up, and the group remembers that there is only one creature to whom silver is fatal. (The Vault-Keeper)
23	Jan/Feb 1954	Graham Ingels	Hansel and Gretel!	Jack Kamen	A gory retelling of the "Hansel and Gretel" fairy tale. (The Old Witch)
23	Jan/Feb 1954	Graham Ingels	Country Clubbing!	Jack Davis	An escaped convict finds himself in a chase through a swamp with a club-wielding maniac, but is everything really as it seems? (The Crypt-Keeper)
24	Mar/Apr 1954	Graham Ingels	Drink to Me Only With Thine Eyes...	Graham Ingels	Bethy has always called her abusive, alcoholic husband a "creep"—but when she and her lover attempt to kill him by drowning him in a whiskey still, it becomes true in a terrifying way. (The Old Witch)
24	Mar/Apr 1954	Graham Ingels	...Only Sin Deep	Jack Kamen	A woman "sells" her beautiful looks to a sinister pawnbroker in order to raise the money to lure a wealthy husband but finds her beauty fading faster than she thought. (The Vault-Keeper)
24	Mar/Apr 1954	Graham Ingels	The Secret	George Evans	An orphaned young boy is taken in by adoptive parents who are hiding a mysterious secret, only to find that their new son may be hiding a thing or two of his own. (The Old Witch)
24	Mar/Apr 1954	Graham Ingels	Head-Room!	Jack Davis	A landlady suspects that her frightening-looking new tenant is the "Ripper" who is murdering local women. (The Crypt-Keeper)
25	May/Jun 1954	Graham Ingels	The New Arrival	Graham Ingels	During a storm, a man takes refuge in a derelict old house but finds he is sharing the residence with the devoted mother of a very unusual child. (The Old Witch)
25	May/Jun 1954	Graham Ingels	Indisposed!	George Evans	A man takes the arrival of his new garbage disposal unit as the perfect way to murder his nagging wife and get away with it, but "disposing" of her body turns out to be no easy task. (The Vault-Keeper)
25	May/Jun 1954	Graham Ingels	Out Cold	Jack Kamen	A story with two endings. Ralph would have asked his beautiful new co-worker on a date, and discovered the horrifying reason for her dislike of cats, if only he had not gone "out cold" first. (The Old Witch)
25	May/Jun 1954	Graham Ingels	The Light in His Life!	Jack Davis	Jake, stranded in his cabin by the long Alaskan winter, is joined by a new arrival sheltering from a snowstorm. To pass the time, Jake recounts his story of why it is never a good idea to be snowed in with one's wife. (The Crypt-Keeper)
26	July/Aug 1954	Graham Ingels	Marriage Vow	Graham Ingels	Martin would like to leave his wife, but she always reminds him that they vowed, "till death do us part." Unfortunately, he has a very pressing reason to keep that promise. (The Old Witch)
26	July/Aug 1954	Graham Ingels	The Shadow Knows	Reed Crandall	When Eric murders his wife, Mabel, so that he can marry his rich girlfriend, he finds Mabel may be gone but her shadow remains. (The Vault-Keeper)
26	July/Aug 1954	Graham Ingels	Spoiled	Jack Kamen	A bored, wealthy housewife begins an affair with a stranger but does not count on her surgeon husband deciding to make them part of an experiment with a new anaesthetic. (The Old Witch)
26	July/Aug 1954	Graham Ingels	Comes the Dawn!	Jack Davis	A group of prospectors in Alaska unearth a vampire frozen beneath the snow. One of them decides to keep the money from their uranium stake for himself and frees the vampire to kill his companions. He knows that vampires crumble into dust once dawn comes—but when will that be? (The Crypt-Keeper)
27	Sept/Oct 1954	Graham Ingels	About Face	Graham Ingels	Jeff is the father of twins Penny and Olga. He loves Penny very much but has never met Olga, who on her mother's instructions is shut away in a locked room of the house. When Jeff's wife dies suddenly, he decides it is time he got to know Olga better and discovers that there was a very good reason to keep her hidden. (The Old Witch)
27	Sept/Oct 1954	Graham Ingels	Game Washed Out!	George Evans	A Puritan man drowns his wife to prevent her from telling the village elders about his adultery, but he finds out that when she said she would "never let him go", she really meant it. (The Vault-Keeper)
27	Sept/Oct 1954	Graham Ingels	The Silent Treatment	Jack Kamen	The ruler of a mythical kingdom orders complete silence throughout the land, even forbidding his subjects to breathe. This leads them to take a very "timely" revenge. (The Old Witch)
27	Sept/Oct 1954	Graham Ingels	Swamped	Reed Crandall	A ghoulish creature who lives in a swamp builds a shack where he can hide the dead bodies upon which he feasts. (The Crypt-Keeper)
28	Nov/Dec 1954	Graham Ingels	The Prude	Graham Ingels	A powerful 19th-century gentleman petitions the local authorities for increasingly stringent rules to protect public decency but goes a little too far when he orders the graves of the dead to be moved so that men and women are not buried together. (The Old Witch)
28	Nov/Dec 1954	Graham Ingels	Numbskull	Bernard Krigstein	A vicious jungle-dwelling hunter becomes the hunted when he accidentally falls into one of his own traps. (The Vault-Keeper)
28	Nov/Dec 1954	Graham Ingels	Audition	Jack Kamen	Ethel Stark is desperate to join Phil Vitale's all-girl orchestra, but will she really do anything to be in the band? (The Old Witch)
28	Nov/Dec 1954	Graham Ingels	A Work of Art!	Jack Davis	An elderly mortician who takes great pride in his work goes to extreme lengths to ensure his hated son-in-law will not be the one to embalm him after his death. (The Crypt-Keeper)

== In other media ==
Steve Fiorilla's latex mask of the Old Witch, as seen on HBO's Tales from the Crypt

"Poetic Justice!" (#12) and "Wish You Were Here" (#22) were adapted for the 1972 film, Tales from the Crypt from Amicus Productions. Three other stories came from Tales from the Crypt and The Vault of Horror. An homage film entitled Creepshow (1982) followed from Warner Brothers, paying tribute to the tone, look, and feel of Haunt and other EC comics without directly adapting any of their stories.

Some stories were also adapted for the HBO television series Tales from the Crypt, which features John Kassir as the voice of the Crypt-Keeper and included comic book covers designed by Mike Vosburg—with at least one drawn by Shawn McManus—to look like the original 1950s covers. The series ran for seven seasons from 1989 to 1996 and spawned 93 episodes. A photograph of a latex mask of the Old Witch, sculpted by Steve Fiorilla, appears in the "Korman's Kalamity" episode (season 2, episode 13). Adapted from "Kamen's Kalamity" (Tales from the Crypt #31), the story is set in EC's offices, where the EC editors have a meeting with illustrator Jack Kamen about his artwork.

The following tales were used in HBO's Tales from the Crypt TV series: "House of Horror" (#15 (1)), "Television Terror" (#17 (3)), "Ear Today... Gone Tomorrow" (#11), "On a Dead Man's Chest" (#12), "Till Death Do We Part" (#12), "What's Cookin" (#12), "Death of Some Salesmen" (#15), "Lover Come Hack to Me" (#19), "Dig That Cat... He's Real Gone" (#21), "Creep Course" (#23), "Only Sin Deep" (#24), "The Secret" (#24), "The New Arrival" (#25), "Spoiled" (#26), "Comes The Dawn" (#26), and "About Face" (#27).

HBO's Tales from the Crypt was adapted into a Saturday morning cartoon series called Tales from the Cryptkeeper in 1993. It lacked the violence and other questionable content that was in the original series. Kassir reprised his role as the voice of the Crypt-Keeper. The Old Witch appeared as a character, voiced by Elizabeth Hanna. It ran for three seasons from 1993 to 1994 and in 1999, spawning 39 episodes.

A pinball machine, Tales from the Crypt, was produced under license by Data East in 1993. The game incorporates art from the original comics as well as the HBO series.

== Sources ==
- Goulart, Ron (2001). Great American Comic Books. Publications International. ISBN 978-0-7853-5590-8.
- Overstreet, Robert L (2004). Official Overstreet Comic Book Price Guide. House of Collectibles. ISBN 978-1-4000-4669-0.
