= Terror Illustrated =

1955 comic published by EC Comics

- Reed Crandall cover, issue #1

Publication information
- Publisher: EC Comics
- Schedule: Quarterly
- Format: Anthology
- Publication date: November/December 1955 - Spring 1956
- No. of issues: 2

Creative team
- Created by: William Gaines; Al Feldstein

Terror Illustrated is a black-and-white magazine published by EC Comics in late 1955 and early 1956. Part of EC's Picto-Fiction line, each magazine featured three to five stories. The format alternated blocks of text with several illustrations per page.

The first issue appeared with a cover date of November–December 1955, but the second issue was the last. A third issue existed but was not printed by EC. The Picto-Fiction magazines lost money from the start, and the line was cancelled when EC's distributor went bankrupt.

Terror Illustrated was edited by Al Feldstein. As with EC's comics, Feldstein was the most prolific writer of the title, and generally wrote up to three stories per issue. In addition to the stories credited to him, Feldstein also wrote under the pseudonyms Maxwell Williams and Alfred E. Neuman. Feldstein included multiple retellings of previous stories, a move suggested by publisher William Gaines. This included "The Basket" and "The Gorilla's Paw" in the first issue and "Horror in the Freak Tent" and "Reflection of Death" in #2. Other contributing writers included Jack Oleck (who had worked as a writer on EC's earlier publications) and John Larner.

Featured illustrators included Reed Crandall, Joe Orlando, George Evans, Graham Ingels, Johnny Craig, Charles Sultan and Jack Davis.

In 2006 Terror Illustrated was reprinted along with the other Picto-Fiction magazines by publisher Russ Cochran (with Gemstone Publishing) in hardbound volumes as the final part of his Complete EC Library. The reprint volume included the previously unpublished third issue of Terror Illustrated. Dark Horse reprinted Terror Illustrated as part of the EC Archives series in 2022.

== Issues ==
#	Date	Cover Artist	Story	Story Artist	Story Writer
1	Dec 1955	Reed Crandall	The Sucker	Reed Crandall	Maxwell Williams
1	Dec 1955	Reed Crandall	Sure-Fire Scheme	Joe Orlando	John Larner
1	Dec 1955	Reed Crandall	Rest in Peace	George Evans	Jack Oleck
1	Dec 1955	Reed Crandall	The Basket	Graham Ingels	Al Feldstein
1	Dec 1955	Reed Crandall	The Gorilla's Paw	Johnny Craig	Alfred E. Neuman
2	April 1956	Reed Crandall	Horror in the Freak Tent	Reed Crandall	Al Feldstein
2	April 1956	Reed Crandall	Requiem	Graham Ingels	John Larner
2	April 1956	Reed Crandall	Mother Love	Charles Sultan	Maxwell Williams
2	April 1956	Reed Crandall	Head Man	Jack Davis	Jack Oleck
2	April 1956	Reed Crandall	Reflection of Death	George Evans	Alfred E. Neuman
