= Three Dimensional E.C. Classics =

- Cover to Three Dimensional Tales from the Crypt of Terror. Art by Al Feldstein.

Publication information
- Publisher: EC Comics
- Schedule: Quarterly
- Format: Anthology
- Publication date: Spring 1954 - March 1954
- No. of issues: 2
- Main character: The Crypt-Keeper

Creative team
- Written by: Al Feldstein; Harvey Kurtzman
- Artist(s): Johnny Craig; Jack Davis; Bill Elder; George Evans; Al Feldstein; Graham Ingels; Bernard Krigstein; Harvey Kurtzman; Joe Orlando; Wally Wood

Three Dimensional E.C. Classics is a quarterly comic book anthology series that was published by EC Comics in 1954. It began publication with its Spring 1954 issue and ceased with its March 1954 issue, producing a total of two issues. The stories it contained were classics in that they were recyclings of stories that had already appeared in earlier EC comic books. However, all new artwork was done for these books, rather than applying the 3-D process to the original illustrations from the first presentations of the stories. They were three-dimensional because they were presented in Anaglyph 3-D. Two 3-D viewers were included with each issue.

== Conception and characteristics ==
Three Dimensional E.C. Classics was conceived in 1953, when 3-D comic books were enjoying a period of great popularity. Its conception was a direct response to the popularity of the form. When Three Dimension Comics, the "World's First" 3-D comic book, sold a million copies, other comic book publishers were naturally eager to carve out their own pieces of the market pie. EC Comics was no exception. They began to lay plans for a 3-D comic series of their own.

That series, Three Dimensional E.C. Classics, was launched in early 1954. One could argue that it was two one-shots instead of a series, but in fact the issues were numbered sequentially: "3-D No. 1" and "3-D No. 2." Only the first issue was called Three Dimensional E.C. Classics. It was a general EC sampler, recycling stories from EC's non-horror lines: Crime SuspenStories, Frontline Combat, Mad and Weird Science. The second issue's reference title was Three Dimensional Tales from the Crypt of Terror. It recycled stories from EC's horror lines exclusively: Tales from the Crypt and The Vault of Horror. It also recycled the Tales from the Crypt Crypt-Keeper as host. But in all other essentials these books were the same: new packages of old stories with all new art, often demanding script changes, for the 3-D format.

== Three-dimensional comics ==
The stories were presented in Anaglyph 3-D. Anaglyph comics employed the same technology that Anaglyph movies did. A 3-D camera photographed a subject from two different positions and angles, corresponding to the points of view of the left and right human eye. The two photographic images were presented overlapping on a single field, with the images differentiated by color, commonly red for the left image and green for the right. The 3-D viewing device had two filters with the colors reversed, green for the left eye and red for the right. The filters separated the images, the green filter blocking the green image and browning the red, and the red filter blocking the red image and browning the green. Thus the left eye saw only the left image and the right eye saw only the right, and the brain behind the eyes combined these 2-D images into a single 3-D view.

But 3-D comics had challenges all their own. A 3-D view of a flat drawing would still look flat. For the view to look otherwise, the drawing had itself to be a 3-D object. This required more labor than 2-D comics did. A 2-D panel had only to be penciled and inked. A 3-D panel had to have its elements separated according to which visual plane or level (fore-, middle- or background) the elements were intended to occupy. The elements had to be drawn on clear acetate cels corresponding to those levels, with the solid parts of the elements opaqued. Then the cels had to be stacked and aligned to assemble the finished panel, with enough separation between the cels to produce the desired 3-D effect.

3-D comics had another challenge as well. A 2-D panel could be elaborately colored, but the limitations of Anaglyph printing of the time dictated that the 3-D panel remain monochrome brown and white.

== Artists and writers ==
Anaglyph 3D panel for "The Thing from the Grave" as rendered by Joe Orlando for Three Dimensional Tales from the Crypt of Terror

The recycled stories were completely redrawn for their 3-D incarnations. The artists who redrew these were all EC regulars: Johnny Craig, Jack Davis, Bill Elder, George Evans, Graham Ingels, Bernard Krigstein, Joe Orlando and Wally Wood. Some of them had drawn the original versions of these stories, while others were interpreting them for the first time. This gives the reader with access to the originals a rare opportunity to see how different artists handled the same scripts, and how the same artists handled the same scripts to meet different requirements. The scripts were themselves at least partly rewritten. The writers were not credited but were usually either Harvey Kurtzman, the writer and editor of Frontline Combat, Two-Fisted Tales and Mad, and Al Feldstein, the editor, and writer in collaboration with Gaines, of practically every other EC comic book of the period.

The 2-D covers were new to these publications and perfectly embodied their 3-D theme. The first, by Kurtzman, showed a skull-littered corridor collapsing into the distance. The second, by Feldstein, showed a pair of hands reaching out of an open comic book to threaten its 3-D viewer-wearing reader, while the Crypt-Keeper and his friends look on approvingly.

The artists for 3-D No. 1 (EC Classics): "V-Vampires" (Mad #3) re-illustrated with new layouts by Wally Wood, "The Monster From The Fourth Dimension" (Weird Science #7, originally illustrated by Feldstein) now illustrated by Bernie Krigstein, "Frank Luke" (Frontline Combat #13) re-illustrated with new layouts by George Evans, and "Mr. Biddy...Killer!" (Crime Suspenstories #5, originally by Jack Davis) now illustrated by Graham Ingels.

The artists for 3-D No. 2 (Tales from the Crypt of Terror): "The Trophy!" (Tales From The Crypt #25) re-illustrated with new layouts by Jack Davis, "The Strange Couple!" (Vault Of Horror #14, originally by Feldstein) now illustrated by Bill Elder, "Bats In My Belfry!" ('Tales From The Crypt #24, originally by Jack Davis) now illustrated by Johnny Craig, and "The Thing From The Grave" (Tales From The Crypt #22, originally by Feldstein, who also co-wrote it with Gardner Fox) now illustrated by Joe Orlando.

== Reception, demise and reprints ==
A third issue of Three Dimensional E.C. Classics, with a science fiction emphasis (and six levels of depth), likely to be sub-titled 3-D Incredible Science Fiction, was prepared with finished story art work but never printed. The stories to have been included were 3-D versions of "Spawn of Venus" (Weird Science #6, originally drawn by Feldstein) now illustrated by Wally Wood, "Slave Ship" (Weird Science #8, originally by George Roussos) now illustrated by Bernie Krigstein, "Child of Tomorrow" (Weird Fantasy #17, originally by Feldstein) now illustrated by Reed Crandall, and "The Planetoid" (Weird Science #10, originally by Joe Orlando) now illustrated by Al Williamson & George Evans.

2-D b&w versions of those last four redrawn stories did finally see print in the late '60s - early '70s in the fanzines Witzend #6, 1969 (Spawn of Venus), Squa Tront #4, 1970 (Slave Ship, Child of Tomorrow), and Squa Tront #5, 1974 (The Planetoid) - up to 2013 that set of fanzines were the only way to acquire any of the works done for this unpublished issue.

Three of the stories from the first issue, all four from the second, and three from the unpublished third, have now been reprinted in 2-D in volumes of the Fantagraphics EC Comic Artists' Library:

Al Williamson: 50 Girls 50 [2014] - with 3D story 'The Planetoid'

Jack Davis: Tain't The Meat.. It's The Humanity [2013] - with 3D story 'The Trophy'

George Evans: Aces High [2014] - with 3D story 'Frank Luke'

Will Elder: The Million Year Picnic [2017] - with 3D story 'The Strange Couple'

Joe Orlando: The Thing From The Grave [2017] - with 3D story 'The Thing From The Grave'

Bernard Krigstein: Master Race [2018] - with 3D stories 'Slave Ship' and 'Monster From The Fourth Dimension'

Graham Ingels: Accidents And Old Lace [2020] - with 3D story 'Mr Biddy Killer'

Johnny Craig: Deadly Beloved [2022] - with 3D story 'Bats In My Belfry'

Reed Crandall: The Bitter End [2023] - with 3D story 'Child Of Tomorrow'

Although the EC books are today considered excellent, superior to most others in the field or even by far the best of their time, they came at a time when the market was oversaturated. The books barely sold at all, with only 300,000 copies of each being printed. But the 3-D comic fad itself lasted less than a year. A number of factors may have contributed to its demise. One factor was price: 3-D comic books commonly cost a quarter instead of the usual dime. Another was societal pressure: monochrome 3-D comics were better suited to darker stories at a time when these were beginning to attract unfavorable public attention. But the greatest factor may well have been the fact that it was a fad. Most people purchased only one 3-D comic book before concluding, "If you've seen one, you've seen them all."

== EC 3-D issue guide ==
#	Date	Issue Title	Cover Artist	Story	3-D Story Artist	Script Originally Used In	Original Artist
1	Spring 1954	Three Dimensional EC Classics	Harvey Kurtzman	V-Vampires!	Wally Wood	Mad #3	Wally Wood
1	Spring 1954	Three Dimensional EC Classics	Harvey Kurtzman	The Monster from the Fourth Dimension	Bernard Krigstein	Weird Science #7	Al Feldstein
1	Spring 1954	Three Dimensional EC Classics	Harvey Kurtzman	Frank Luke	George Evans	Frontline Combat #13	George Evans
1	Spring 1954	Three Dimensional EC Classics	Harvey Kurtzman	Mr. Biddy...Killer!	Graham Ingels	Crime SuspenStories #5	Jack Davis
2	March 1954	Three Dimensional Tales From The Crypt Of Terror	Al Feldstein	The Trophy!	Jack Davis	Tales from the Crypt #25	Jack Davis
2	March 1954	Three Dimensional Tales From The Crypt Of Terror	Al Feldstein	The Strange Couple!	Bill Elder	The Vault of Horror #14	Al Feldstein
2	March 1954	Three Dimensional Tales From The Crypt Of Terror	Al Feldstein	Bats in My Belfry!	Johnny Craig	Tales from the Crypt #24	Jack Davis
2	March 1954	Three Dimensional Tales From The Crypt Of Terror	Al Feldstein	The Thing from the Grave	Joe Orlando	Tales from the Crypt #22	Al Feldstein
3	Summer 1954 (unpublished)	(possibly) Three Dimensional Weird Science-Fantasy	N/A	Spawn of Venus	Wally Wood	Weird Science #6	Al Feldstein
3	Summer 1954 (unpublished)	(possibly) Three Dimensional Weird Science-Fantasy	N/A	Slave Ship	Bernie Krigstein	Weird Science #8	George Roussos
3	Summer 1954 (unpublished)	(possibly) Three Dimensional Weird Science-Fantasy	N/A	Child of Tomorrow	Reed Crandall	Weird Fantasy #17	Al Feldstein
3	Summer 1954 (unpublished)	(possibly) Three Dimensional Weird Science-Fantasy	N/A	The Planetoid	Al Williamson & George Evans	Weird Science #10	Joe Orlando
