= Tales from the Crypt (book) =

Collection of eight horror comic stories

- cover of the 1st edition
- Date: 1964
- Main characters: The Crypt-Keeper, The Old Witch, The Vault-Keeper
- Publisher: Ballantine Books

Creative team
- Writers: Al Feldstein
- Artists: Johnny Craig, Reed Crandall, Jack Davis, George Evans, Al Feldstein, Frank Frazetta, Graham Ingels

Original publication
- Published in: The Haunt of Fear, Tales from the Crypt, The Vault of Horror

Tales from the Crypt is a mass-market paperback collection of eight horror comic stories gathered from the pages of the EC Comics comic books of the 1950s. It is one of five such collections published by Ballantine Books between 1964 and 1966 (the others are The Vault of Horror, Tales of the Incredible, The Autumn People and Tomorrow Midnight). The presentation of the material is problematic at best, since the color comic book pages are represented in black and white and broken into horizontal strips to fit the mass-market paperback format. Still, the collections are historically important. They were the first attempt to resurrect the EC comics, only a decade after public outcry had driven them off the racks. They were the first introduction of those comics to a generation of readers too young to remember them in their first run.

The stories are drawn from the comic books Tales from the Crypt, The Vault of Horror and The Haunt of Fear. The writer was not credited in the original publications but was probably Al Feldstein, the editor of the books. The artists were such EC stalwarts as Johnny Craig, Reed Crandall, Jack Davis, George Evans, Feldstein and Graham Ingels.

The cover painting by Frank Frazetta, depicting the Crypt-Keeper reading in a moonlit cemetery, is original to this collection. Frazetta was himself an EC alumnus. This is one of his earliest horror covers, predating his iconic work for Warren Publishing's Creepy and Eerie.

The screenplay of the Amicus Productions motion picture Tales from the Crypt (1972) was mainly derived from this collection.

== Contents ==
- "Let the Punishment Fit the Crime" (Davis)
- "Dead Right" (Davis)
- "The High Cost of Dying" (Crandall)
- "Reflection of Death" (Feldstein)
- "Poetic Justice" (Ingels)
- "Whirlpool" (Craig)
- "Blind Alleys" (Evans)
- "And All Through the House" (Craig)
