= The EC Artists' Library =

Books released by Fantagraphics Books

Publication information
- Publisher: Fantagraphics Books
- Format: Ongoing series
- Genre: Horror; Science fiction Crime; War
- Publication date: November 15th, 2012

Creative team
- Created by: Numerous creators were involved
- Written by: Numerous writers were involved
- Artist: Numerous artists were involved
- Editor: J. Michael Catron, Gary Groth

The EC Artists' Library are a series of books released by Fantagraphics Books, which collect anthologies by artists and themes of the comics originally published by EC Comics.

== Background ==
On July 23, 2011, Gary Groth, president of Fantagraphics Books, announced during the Fantagraphics panel at San Diego Comic-Con that Fantagraphics had established an agreement with William M. Gaines Agent, Inc. to publish The EC Artists' Library starting in 2012, with the aim to reintroduce the EC stories to new contemporary readers. with the exception of MAD, whose rights belonged to another owner. Fantagraphics' publication would become the first EC Comics collection arranged by artist.

== Format ==
Volumes of the series have been published in hardcover format measuring 7.25 inches × 10.25 inches (185 mm × 261 mm) and are printed in black-and-white. The books are edited by J. Michael Catron and were initially designed by Jacob Covey. Subsequent designers have followed Covey's design format. Each volume contains between 200 and 250 pages including the comics and extras. Individual volumes are also available bundled in a boxed set of four.

== Volumes and box sets ==
=== Volumes ===
Volumes
Volume	Release date	Title	Artist in focus	Genre	Page count	ISBN
1	2012-11-15	Corpse on the Imjin! and Other Stories	Harvey Kurtzman	War	240	978-1-60699-545-7
2	2012-11-15	Came the Dawn and Other Stories	Wallace Wood	Horror/Crime	240	978-1-60699-546-4
3	2013-04-06	50 Girls 50 and Other Stories	Al Williamson	Science Fiction	240	978-1-60699-577-8
4	2013-04-06	Tain't the Meat... It's the Humanity! and Other Stories	Jack Davis	Horror	240	978-1-60699-578-5
5	2013-09-07	Fall Guy for Murder and Other Stories	Johnny Craig	Crime/Horror	160	978-1-60699-658-4
6	2013-09-07	Child of Tomorrow and Other Stories	Al Feldstein	Science Fiction	160	978-1-60699-659-1
7	2014-02-15	Zero Hour and Other Stories	Jack Kamen	Science Fiction	176	978-1-60699-704-8
8	2014-02-15	Sucker Bait and Other Stories	Graham Ingels	Horror	208	978-1-60699-689-8
9	2014-06-08	Judgment Day and Other Stories	Joe Orlando	Science Fiction	184	978-1-60699-727-7
10	2014-07-05	Bomb Run and Other Stories	John Severin	War	264	978-1-60699-749-9
11	2014-12-06	Aces High	George Evans	War/Crime	216	978-1-60699-784-0
12	2015-01-04	Spawn of Mars and Other Stories	Wallace Wood	Science Fiction	216	978-1-60699-805-2
13	2015-07-04	Grave Business and Other Stories	Graham Ingels	Horror	224	978-1-60699-827-4
14	2015-10-02	Forty Whacks and Other Stories	Jack Kamen	Horror	208	978-1-60699-862-5
15	2016-02-08	The High Cost of Dying and Other Stories	Reed Crandall	Horror	176	978-1-60699-908-0
16	2016-06-21	The Living Mummy and Other Stories	Jack Davis	Horror	224	978-1-60699-929-5
17	2016-12-06	Voodoo Vengeance and Other Stories	Johnny Craig	Horror	216	978-1-60699-965-3
18	2017-01-31	The Million Year Picnic	Will Elder		216	978-1-60699-982-0
19	2017-06-28	The Thing from the Grave and Other Stories	Joe Orlando	Horror	240	978-1-60699-929-5
20	2017-10-31	Daddy Lost His Head and Other Stories	Jack Kamen	Horror	192	978-1-68396-050-8
21	2018-01-31	Master Race and Other Stories	Bernard Krigstein	Crime/Horror/War/Science Fiction	232	978-1-68396-094-2
22	2018-06-30	Death Stand and Other Stories	Jack Davis	War	192	978-1-68396-103-1
23	2018-11-17	Doctor of Horror and Other Stories	Graham Ingels		224	978-1-68396-138-3
24	2019-02-12	The Martian Monster and Other Stories	Jack Kamen		160	978-1-68396-168-0
25	2019-09-10	The Woman Who Loved Life and Other Stories	Johnny Craig		232	978-1-68396-201-4
26	2019-11-15	Atom Bomb and Other Stories	Wallace Wood		272	978-1-68396-245-8
27	2020-01-14	Man and Superman and Other Stories	Harvey Kurtzman		180	978-1-68396-275-5
28	2020-06-23	Terror Train and Other Stories	Al Feldstein		296	978-1-68396-329-5
29	2020-11-24	Accidents and Old Lace and Other Stories	Graham Ingels	Horror/Crime	232	978-1-68396-380-6
30	2021-01-12	A Slight Case of Murder and Other Stories	George Evans	Horror	224	978-1-68396-398-1
31	2021-07-13	Three for the Money and Other Stories	Jack Kamen		224	978-1-68396-436-0
32	2022-06-07	Code of Honor and Other Stories	John Severin		248	978-1-68396-488-9
33	2022-11-22	Deadly Beloved And Other Stories	Johnny Craig	Crime/Horror	256	978-1-68396-576-3
34	2023-06-13	The Planetoid And Other Stories	Joe Orlando	Science Fiction	208	978-1-68396-762-0
35	2023-12-12	The Bitter End And Other Stories	Reed Crandall, George Roussos	Crime, Horror, Science fiction	232	978-1-68396-892-4
36	2024-04-09	Kamen’s Kalamity And Other Stories	Jack Kamen	Horror	248	978-1-68396-918-1
37	2024-09-17	Foul Play And Other Stories	Jack Davis	Horror, Science Fiction, War	312	978-1-68396-954-9
38	2025-09-30	Spawn of Venus And Other Stories	Wallace Wood	Science Fiction	248	979-8-87500-039-3
39	2025-11-18	My Gun is the Jury	Jack Davis & Wallace Wood	Satire/Comedy	280	979-8-87500-100-0
40	2026-07-07	Shock Treatment And Other Stories	Jack Kamen, Reed Crandall, Graham Ingels, and Joe Orlando	Drama	264	979-8-87500-234-2
0	2026-11-03	The Crypt of Covers: The Complete EC Covers Compendium	Grant Geissman (Editor)	Covers	500	979-8-87500-253-3

=== Box sets ===
Box sets
Vol.	Release date	Title	Volumes	ISBN
1	2014	The EC Comics Slipcase Volume 1	1–4	978-1-60699-728-4
2	2015	The EC Comics Slipcase Volume 2	5–8	978-1-60699-821-2
3	2017	The EC Comics Slipcase Volume 3	9–12	978-1-68396-007-2
4	2019-11-05	The EC Comics Slipcase Volume 4	13–16	978-1-68396-246-5
5	2020-11-03	The EC Comics Slipcase Volume 5	17–20	978-1-68396-363-9
6	2021-11-09	The EC Comics Slipcase Volume 6	21–24	978-1-68396-476-6
7	2025-11-18	The EC Comics Slipcase Volume 7	25–28	978-1-68396-679-1
