= The Autumn People =

Horror comic collection

- First edition
- Date: October 1965
- Publisher: Ballantine Books

Creative team
- Writers: Ray Bradbury, adaptation by Al Feldstein
- Artists: Johnny Craig, Jack Davis, George Evans, Graham Ingels, Jack Kamen, Joe Orlando

Original publication
- Published in: Crime SuspenStories, The Haunt of Fear, Shock SuspenStories, Tales from the Crypt, The Vault of Horror

The Autumn People is a mass-market paperback collection of comic adaptations of eight short horror and crime stories by Ray Bradbury, gathered from the pages of the EC Comics comic books of the 1950s. It is one of five EC collections published by Ballantine Books between 1964 and 1966 (the others are Tales from the Crypt, The Vault of Horror, Tales of the Incredible and Tomorrow Midnight), and one of two made up of comic adaptations of Bradbury's work (the other is Tomorrow Midnight). The presentation of the material is problematic at best, since the color comic book pages are represented in black and white and broken into horizontal strips to fit the mass-market paperback format. Still, the collections are historically important. They were the first attempt to resurrect the EC comics, only a decade after public outcry had driven them off the racks. They were the first introduction of those comics to a generation of readers too young to remember them in their first run.

The stories are drawn from the comic books Tales from the Crypt, The Vault of Horror, The Haunt of Fear, Crime SuspenStories and Shock SuspenStories. The adaptation was not credited in the original publications but was probably by Al Feldstein, the editor of the books. The artists were such EC stalwarts as Johnny Craig, Jack Davis, George Evans, Graham Ingels, Jack Kamen and Joe Orlando.

The cover painting by Frank Frazetta, himself an EC alumnus, is original to this collection.

== Contents ==
- Foreword
- "There Was an Old Woman" (Ingels)
- "The Screaming Woman" (Kamen)
- "Touch and Go!" (Craig)
- "The Small Assassin" (Evans)
- "The Handler" (Ingels)
- "The Lake" (Orlando)
- "The Coffin" (Davis)
- "Let’s Play 'Poison'" (Davis)
