= The Vault of Horror (book) =

Collection of eight horror comic stories

- First edition
- Date: 1965
- Main characters: The Crypt-Keeper, The Old Witch, The Vault-Keeper
- Publisher: Ballantine Books

Creative team
- Writers: Al Feldstein
- Artists: Johnny Craig, Jack Davis, George Evans, Frank Frazetta, Graham Ingels, Joe Orlando

Original publication
- Published in: The Haunt of Fear, Tales from the Crypt, The Vault of Horror

The Vault of Horror is a mass-market paperback collection of eight horror comic stories gathered from the pages of the EC Comics comic books of the 1950s. It is one of five such collections published by Ballantine Books between 1964 and 1966 (the others are Tales from the Crypt, Tales of the Incredible, The Autumn People and Tomorrow Midnight). The presentation of the material is problematic at best, since the color comic book pages are represented in black and white and broken into horizontal strips to fit the mass-market paperback format. Still, the collections are historically important. They were the first attempt to resurrect the EC comics, only a decade after public outcry had driven them off the racks. They were the first introduction of those comics to a generation of readers too young to remember them in their first run.

The stories are drawn from the comic books The Vault of Horror, Tales from the Crypt and The Haunt of Fear. The writer was not credited in the original publications but was probably Al Feldstein, the editor of the books. The artists were such EC stalwarts as Johnny Craig, Jack Davis, George Evans, Graham Ingels and Joe Orlando.

The cover painting by Frank Frazetta, himself an EC alumnus, depicting the Vault-Keeper reading in a candlelit burial vault, is original to this collection.

== Contents ==
- "Star Light, Star Bright" (Craig)
- "Last Respects" (Ingels)
- "The Trophy" (Davis)
- "Curiosity Killed" (Evans)
- "The Basket" (Davis)
- "Fed Up" (Craig)
- "Wish You Were Here" (Ingels)
- "The Craving Grave" (Orlando)
