= The Vault of Horror =

The Vault of Horror may refer to:

- The Vault of Horror (comics), an American horror comic
- The Vault of Horror (book), a collection of eight horror comic stories
- The Vault of Horror (film), a 1973 British horror film
- Vault of Horrors, 2024 studio album by Aborted
