= Tomorrow Midnight =

- First edition
- Date: 1966
- Publisher: Ballantine Books

Creative team
- Writers: Ray Bradbury, adaptation by Al Feldstein
- Artists: Bill Elder, Jack Kamen, Joe Orlando, John Severin, Al Williamson, Wally Wood

Original publication
- Published in: Weird Fantasy, Weird Science

Tomorrow Midnight is a mass-market paperback collection of comic adaptations of eight short science fiction stories by Ray Bradbury, gathered from the pages of the EC Comics comic books of the 1950s. It is one of five EC collections published by Ballantine Books between 1964 and 1966 (the others are Tales from the Crypt, The Vault of Horror, Tales of the Incredible and The Autumn People), and one of two made up of comic adaptations of Bradbury's work (the other is The Autumn People). The presentation of the material is problematic at best, since the color comic book pages are represented in black and white and broken into horizontal strips to fit the mass-market paperback format. Still, the collections are historically important. They were the first attempt to resurrect the EC comics, only a decade after public outcry had driven them off the racks. They were the first introduction of those comics to a generation of readers too young to remember them in their first run.

The stories are drawn from the comic books Weird Fantasy and Weird Science. The adaptation was not credited in the original publications but was probably by Al Feldstein, the editor of the books. The artists were such EC stalwarts as Bill Elder, Jack Kamen, Joe Orlando, John Severin, Al Williamson and Wally Wood.

The cover painting by Frank Frazetta, himself an EC alumnus, is original to this collection.

== Contents ==
- Foreword
- "Punishment Without Crime" (Kamen)
- "I, Rocket" (Williamson)
- "King of the Gray Spaces" (Severin & Elder)
- "The One Who Waits" (Williamson)
- "The Long Years" (Orlando)
- "There Will Come Soft Rains" (Wood)
- "Mars Is Heaven!" (Wood)
- "Outcast of the Stars" (Orlando)
