= Raheem Rah-Nyse Gibson =

Raheem Devon Gibson
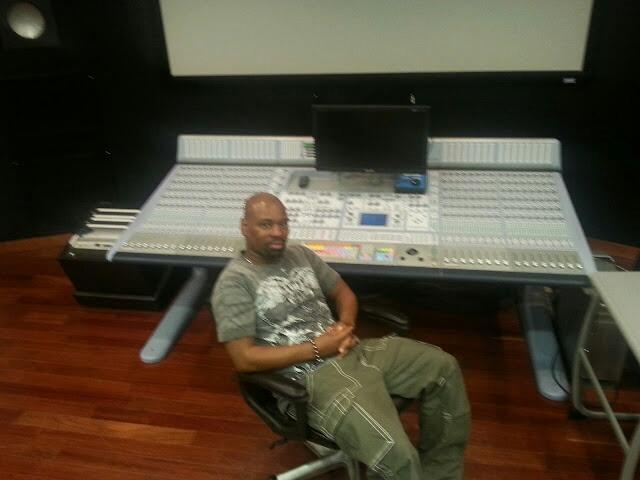
- Gibson in 2013

Background information
- Also known as: Rah Nyse, Nyse
- Born: Raheem Devon Gibson; February 13, 1972 (age 53)
- Origin: The Bronx, New York City, New York, United States
- Genres: Hip hop EDM, R&B, pop
- Occupations: Record producer; songwriter
- Instrument: Vocals
- Years active: 1995–present
- Labels: Nyse Music; Freeze; Bad Boy; Sleeping Bag
- Member of: The Hitmen
- Website: wowmusicgrp.com

Raheem Devon Gibson (born February 13, 1972), also known as Rah Nyse (or simply Nyse), is an American record producer and songwriter. He produced "Let Me Find Out" for the hip hop trio Naughty By Nature as well as "I Want the World to See" for the rapper G-Dep, which appeared on his album Child of the Ghetto (2001).

In 2000, Gibson signed with Sean "Diddy" Combs' Bad Boy Records, as part of the label's in house production group, The Hitmen. The group included fellow producers Chucky Thompson, D-Dot, Stevie J, and Mario Winans.

== Biography ==
Nyse began his career as a disc jockey in the late 1980s performing turntablism where he played continuous music mixes at live shows in the parks of The Bronx where he grew up. He was inspired by the unique styles and skills of iconic mixmasters DJ Scratch, DJ Jazzy Jay and DJ Jazzy Jeff. While spinning records in his hometown, Rah-Nyse decided to take his career to the next level, and in 1993 he became a co-founding member of the rap duo ‘Out of Order’ with then business partner DJ Storm. The following year, ‘Out of Order’ was signed to independent Hip hop record label Freeze Records (formerly known as Sleeping Bag Records which featured major Hip Hop acts including EPMD). The group landed an influential endorsement from ‘Shake Whatcha Mama Gave Ya’ rapper Rock Logic from Stik-E and the Hoodz. In 1994, Nyse and his bandmate began opening for Stik-E and the Hoodz and that same year released its first self-produced single “DreamState". In 1996, Nyse and his then business partner left Freeze Records to focus on music production. He co-founded ‘Hot Bloc Productions’ and worked on independent projects for other groups, including The Autumn People from Durban Poison Records (owned by DreamWorks Records), and ‘Totally Basic’ from Atlantic Records.

In early 2000, ‘Hot Bloc Productions’ gained popularity with the blockbuster hit first single “Dot Vs. TMR” from the album entitled Tell 'Em Why U Madd produced for All About The Benjamins artist/producer D-Dot a.k.a. The Madd Rapper, which also featured the song “You’re All Alone” produced by Kanye West. That same year, Hot Bloc was signed to a four-year production deal with Bad Boy Records under the management of music mogul Sean Diddy Combs. Under Diddy's management, Hot Bloc worked as part of the elite music production team known as “The Hitmen,” which included other prominent producers such as Kanye West, Deric "D-Dot" Angelettie, Steven "Stevie J" Jordan, Mario Winans, Easy Mo Bee, Chucky Thompson, and Nashiem Myrick. At Bad Boy, Nyse worked with major acts such as Naughty by Nature, G. Dep and Harve Pierre a.k.a. Joe Hooker.

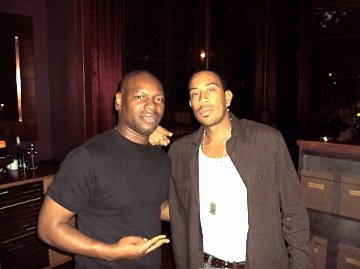
Rah-Nyse with rapper Ludacris

While with Bad Boy, he produced music for various Hip hop, RnB, and Alternative artists out of his music lab Hot Bloc Studios in the Bronx, N.Y. Many artists recorded and utilized the team for production, including French Montana, Lord Tariq and Peter Gunz, Hell Rell, Ice Shuler, D.F.L. and others. In 2003, rapper Ice Shuler filmed the video for his first single “Serious” at Hot Bloc Studios, for the independent Hip hop label ‘Board of Directors, Inc.’. The single featured appearances by Remy Ma and DJ Kay Slay a.k.a.The Drama King. Rah Nyse decided to embark on a new musical venture and relocated to Atlanta in 2008 to pursue opportunities as a solo producer. The following year, he was hired by Indie label ‘Southern World Records’ to produce music for contemporary RnB artist Eddie J. By 2009, Nyse produced “I Can’t Stop Waiting” for his album “Feels Like Rain” and performed on his 2010 single “Never Let You Go”. In a 2015 interview with Icon Studios in Atlanta Georgia, Nyse said he strives to be the “Hitmaker of the Future”. He was commissioned by former American Idol contestant Nica Nashae to produce her first solo project and has established major relationships in the music licensing industry.

== Record Labels ==
Rah Nyse was signed to Freeze Records as the group ‘Out of Order’ in 1994. The group went on to form production team ‘Hot Bloc Productions’ and was signed to Diddy’s Bad Boy Records as a ‘Hitmen’ producer from 2000 to 2004. As a producer, he worked with several major labels including Atlantic Records, TVT Records, Sony Music Entertainment, Columbia and others.

== Discography ==
HOT BLOC PRODUCTIONS DISCOGRAPHY

Year	Artist	Title	Label
1994	Out of Order	"DREAMSTATE"	Freeze Records
1997/1998	The Autumn People	"VARIOUS SONGS"	Durban Poison/DreamWorks Records
1998	Totally Basic	"FALLEN"	Atlantic Records
1999	The Madd Rapper	"DOT vs. TMR "	Crazy Cat/Columbia Records
2001	G-Dep	"I WANT THE WORLD TO SEE"	Bad Boy Records
2002	Naughty by Nature	"LET ME FIND OUT"	TVT Records
2003	Ice Shuler	"VARIOUS SONGS"	B.O.D. Records
2004	D.F.L.	THE MOVEMENT	(Mixtape)
2005/2006	Various	"REBIRTH - THE MIXTAPE"	Hot Bloc
2009	Eddie J.	"CAN'T KEEP WAITING"	Southern World Records
2010	Eddie J.	"NEVER LET YOU GO ft. RAH-NYSE"	Southern World Records
