= Mort Leav =

American artist (1916-2005)

- Born: Mortimer Leav; July 9, 1916
- Died: September 21, 2005 (aged 89)
- Areas: Penciller, Inker
- Pseudonym: Stanley Maxwell

Mortimer Leav (July 9, 1916 – September 21, 2005) was an American artist best known as co-creator of the influential comic-book character the Heap, and for his advertising art, which included some of the earliest TV commercial storyboards – among them, for Procter & Gamble's venerable Charmin bathroom-tissue character, the grocer Mr. Whipple.

== Biography ==
=== Early life and career ===
Mort Leav began his professional career in 1936 with New York City's Editors Press Service, supplying illustrations for articles syndicated to South American newspapers. Five years later, he entered the field of comic books at the Jerry Iger Studio, one of a handful of "packagers" that supplied outsourced comics to publishers entering the new medium. Earning $30 a week – a marked improvement on the $78 monthly he'd earned his first year at EPS – Leav penciled and inked the feature "Jungleman" in Harvey Comics' Champ Comics (under the pseudonym Stanley Maxwell); "ZX-5, Spies in Action" in Fiction House's Jumbo Comics (under the pen name Major Thorpe); "The Hangman" for MLJ; and, for Quality Comics, "Sally O'Neil, Policewoman" in National Comics, and "Hell Diver" in Hit Comics, among others.

=== The Heap and postwar work ===
Leav and writer Harry Stein co-created the World War II aviator character Skywolf in Hillman Periodicals' Air Fighters Comics No. 2 (Nov. 1942), and in the following month's issue introduced the "muck creature" the Heap – a progenitor, along with the title character of Theodore Sturgeon's short story "It", of the popular 1970s characters Swamp Thing and Man-Thing, among others.

Leav was drafted in 1943 and did his military service as an illustrator for U.S. Army magazines, while moonlighting for comic books. Upon returning to civilian life, he drew, per one source, several Captain America stories for Timely Comics, the 1940s precursor of Marvel Comics, but this remain uncorroborated by such standard references as the Grand Comics Database and Atlas Tales, the latter of which lists only two 1942–43 Destroyer stories as Leav's Timely output.

In 1946, Leav became art director for publisher Ruth "Ray" Hermann's Orbit Publications. He drew the bulk of that company's comic-book covers and lead stories, including for the crime title Wanted Comics. By 1950, he was drawing for The Westerner Comics (a.k.a. Will Bill Pecos Westerner) and Love Diary for the Orbit-related, multi-named firm Our Publishing Co. / Toytown / Patches. Leav would also contribute stories to Lev Gleason Publications' The Amazing Adventures of Buster Crabbe in 1954 and do some work for Ziff-Davis romance comics and for the "Triple Nickel Books" comics of publishers Woody Gelman and Ben Solomon before leaving the field.

=== Later life and career ===
His last place of residence was Beverly, Massachusetts.
