= Tales of the Incredible =

EC Comics reprint collection (1965)

- First edition
- Date: 1965
- Publisher: Ballantine Books

Creative team
- Writers: Al Feldstein
- Artists: Al Feldstein, Frank Frazetta, Joe Orlando, Al Williamson, Wally Wood

Original publication
- Published in: Weird Fantasy, Weird Science

Tales of the Incredible is a mass-market paperback collection of eight science fiction comic stories gathered from the pages of the EC Comics comic books of the 1950s. It is one of five collections published by Ballantine Books between 1964 and 1966 (the others are Tales from the Crypt, The Vault of Horror, The Autumn People and Tomorrow Midnight). The presentation of the material is problematic at best, since the color comic book pages are represented in black and white and broken into horizontal strips to fit the mass-market paperback format. Still, the collections are historically important. They were the first attempt to resurrect the EC comics, only a decade after public outcry had driven them off the racks. They were the first introduction of those comics to a generation of readers too young to remember them in their first run.

The stories are drawn from the comic books Weird Fantasy and Weird Science. The writer was not credited in the original publications but was probably Al Feldstein, the editor of the books. The artists were such EC stalwarts as Feldstein, Joe Orlando, Al Williamson and Wally Wood.

The cover painting by Frank Frazetta, himself an EC alumnus, is original to this collection.

== Contents ==
- "Spawn of Mars" (Wood)
- "Plucked" (Wood)
- "By George" (Williamson)
- "50 Girls 50" (Williamson)
- "Judgment Day" (Orlando)
- "Chewed Out" (Orlando)
- "Child of Tomorrow" (Feldstein)
- "The Precious Years" (Wood)
