= Ray Herman =

- Born: Ruth Rae Hermann; June 9, 1920 Brooklyn, New York, U.S.
- Died: December 26, 1996 (aged 76) New York City
- Areas: Penciller, Inker, Editor, Publisher
- Pseudonyms: Rae Herman; Ray Mann
- Notable works: Orbit Publications

Ray Herman (b. Ruth Rae Hermann, June 9, 1920 – December 26, 1996), also known as Rae Herman or Ray Mann, was a publisher, editor, writer, penciller, and inker whose career spanned from 1940 to 1955. Her company, Orbit Publications, was a founding member of the Association of Comics Magazine Publishers, for which she served as secretary and board director.

She started her career as an assistant to Frank Z. Temerson, publisher for Helnit, Et-Es-Go Magazines, and other loosely affiliated companies. From 1943 to 1944, she was managing editor and co-owner (with Esther Temerson) of Continental Magazines, publishers of Cat-Man Comics and Terrific Comics. In 1945 she wrote for the syndicated comic Hep Cats, before taking over as publisher, business manager, and co-owner (with Marjorie May) of Orbit Publications in 1946.

Orbit's titles included The Westerner (featuring Wild Bill Pecos), Love Diary, Patches, and Wanted Comics, and contributing artists included Syd Shores, Bernard Krigstein and Mort Leav. She wrote for their Western comics, as well as Love Diary and another romance comic, Love Journal (both published under the "Our Publishing" imprint). Hermann was also the rare actually female writer of a romance comic advice column. (Most advice columnists for other romance comics were male staff members using a female pseudonym.) In 1948, she also pencilled and inked crime comics for D.S. Publishing.

Also in 1948, Herman helped found the Association of Comics Magazine Publishers (ACMP) in response to the rising anti-comics sentiment in the United States. The ACMP created the first Publication Code for policing the content of comics, but comics were not subject to formal review to use their seal of approval, and it was largely ignored. By 1950, the ACMP was virtually defunct, though a few publishers continued to use the seal. However, its Publication Code formed the backbone of the later Comics Code.

== Pop culture references ==
In issue #23 of Cat-Man Comics (December 1943) (published by Frank Z. Temerson's Holyoke Publishing), superhero The Hood's blonde girlfriend's name is revealed to be "Miss Ray Hermann," later spelled "Ray Herman" and "Rae Herman."
