= Association of Comics Magazine Publishers =

American industry trade group (1947–1954)

- Successor: Comics Magazine Association of America
- Formation: May 1947; 79 years ago
- Dissolved: c. 1954
- Purpose: To regulate the content of comic books in the face of public criticism
- Headquarters: New York, NY
- President: George T. Delacorte Jr.
- Executive Director: Henry E. Schultz

The Association of Comics Magazine Publishers (ACMP) was an American industry trade group formed in the late 1940s to regulate the content of comic books in the face of public criticism during that time. It was a precursor to the Comics Magazine Association of America, and the ACMP Publishers Code served as the template for a more detailed set of rules enforced by the CMAA's Comics Code Authority.

== History ==
The ACMP was formed in May 1947 and publicly announced on July 1, 1948. Founding members included:

- Phil Keenan, publisher of Hillman Periodicals
- Leverett Gleason, publisher of Lev Gleason Publications
- Bill Gaines, publisher of EC Comics
- Harold Moore, publisher of Famous Funnies
- Rae Herman, publisher of Orbit Publications
- Frank Armer, distributor
- Irving Manheimer, distributor

George T. Delacorte, Jr., founder of Dell Publishing, which included Dell Comics, served as president, and Manhattan attorney Henry E. Schultz, president of the board of Queens College and a member of the New York City Board of Higher Education, as executive director. The ACMP was formed after "accusations from several fronts charged comic books with contributing to the rising rates of juvenile delinquency", and city and county ordinances had banned some publications though these were effectively overturned with a March 29, 1948, United States Supreme Court ruling that a 64-year-old New York State law outlawing publications with "pictures and stories of deeds of bloodshed, lust or crime" was unconstitutional. Regardless, the uproar increased upon the publication of two articles:

- "Horror in the Nursery", by Judith Crist, in the March 25, 1948, issue of Collier's Weekly, based upon the symposium "Psychopathology of Comic Books" held a week earlier by psychiatrist Fredric Wertham
- "The Comics ... Very Funny!", by Frederic Wertham, in the May 29, 1948, issue of The Saturday Review of Literature

Spencer, West Virginia held a comic-book burning on October 26, 1948. After the Associated Press reported on it, copycat comic-book burnings followed around the country, particularity in Catholic parishes.

== Publishers Code ==
In 1948, the association released their "Publishers Code," drawing on the Hollywood Production Code (better known as the "Hays Code"), which had also been drafted to stave off external regulation. Like the Production Code, it forbid portrayals of crime that might "throw sympathy against the law" or "weaken respect for established authority," and prohibited "ridicule or attack on any religious or racial group." "Sexy, wanton comics" were not to be published, and divorce was not to be "treated humorously or represented as glamorous or alluring." Comics that complied with the code were offered a "Seal of Approval."

=== ACMP Publishers Code of 1948 ===
1. Sexy, wanton comics should not be published. No drawing should show a female indecently or unduly exposed, and in no event more nude than in a bathing suit commonly worn in the United States of America.
2. Crime should not be presented in such a way as to throw sympathy against the law and justice or to inspire others with the desire for imitation. No comics shall show the details and methods of a crime committed by a youth. Policemen, judges, Government officials, and respected institutions should not be portrayed as stupid, ineffective, or represented in such a way to weaken respect for established authority.
3. No scenes of sadistic torture should be shown.
4. Vulgar and obscene language should never be used. Slang should be kept to a minimum and used only when essential to the story.
5. Divorce should not be treated humorously or represented as glamorous or alluring.
6. Ridicule or attack on any religious or racial group is never permissible.

== Dissolution of the ACMP ==
The code, however, was not a success, ignored by both large and small publishers. Some publishers, such as Dell Comics, Archie Comics, DC Comics, Fawcett Comics, and initially Marvel Comics, refused to join the organization, the latter three had its own editorial advisory boards. Marvel later relented and the group begin using the ACMP seal by 1952. Others, such as founding member EC Comics, terminated their participation. Those who continued as members made use of the ACMP seal of approval without any formal process of review. Describing the situation in 1954 at a comic book hearing conducted by the Senate Subcommittee on Juvenile Delinquency, Director Schultz said: "The association, I would say, is out of business and so is the code."

== Successor organization ==
In 1954, a mounting tide of criticism, including a new book by Wertham — Seduction of the Innocent — and congressional hearings, spurred the formation of the ACMP's successor, the Comics Magazine Association of America (CMAA). The ACMP Publishers Code served as the template for a more detailed set of rules enforced by the CMAA's Comics Code Authority.

EC comics and Mad magazine publisher, William M. Gaines, in a 1983 interview with The Comics Journal revealed:

After the Senate Subcommittee hearings, and this isn’t very well known, but I can prove it again, I sent a letter to every comics publisher, invited them to a meeting and footed the bill for the hall. We took a big place somewhere, and all these people showed up and I tried to convince them that we should form an association and hire the Gleuks of Harvard or anybody else we could find who could do some sort of independent, honest research into whether comic books in truth were the horrendous things that people said they were. And since I really didn’t think they were, I figured, such a study would exonerate us. None of these guys wanted to do that, and right away the whole thing was taken away from me, and they turned it into a situation where they wrote a Code, and the Code forbade the use of the words 'horror,' 'terror,' or 'crime' — this was all my books — and 'weird,' even 'weird,' [laughter] so that would wipe me out. So I didn’t join the association. But then I decided to drop all those books anyway and put out the New Direction stuff. I put out the six first issues, six bi-monthlies, and they sold 10, 15 percent. You can’t believe how horrendous the sales were. And I later found out that it was because the word was passed by the wholesalers, "Get ‘im!" So they got me.
