= Orbit Publications =

Defunct American comic book publishing company

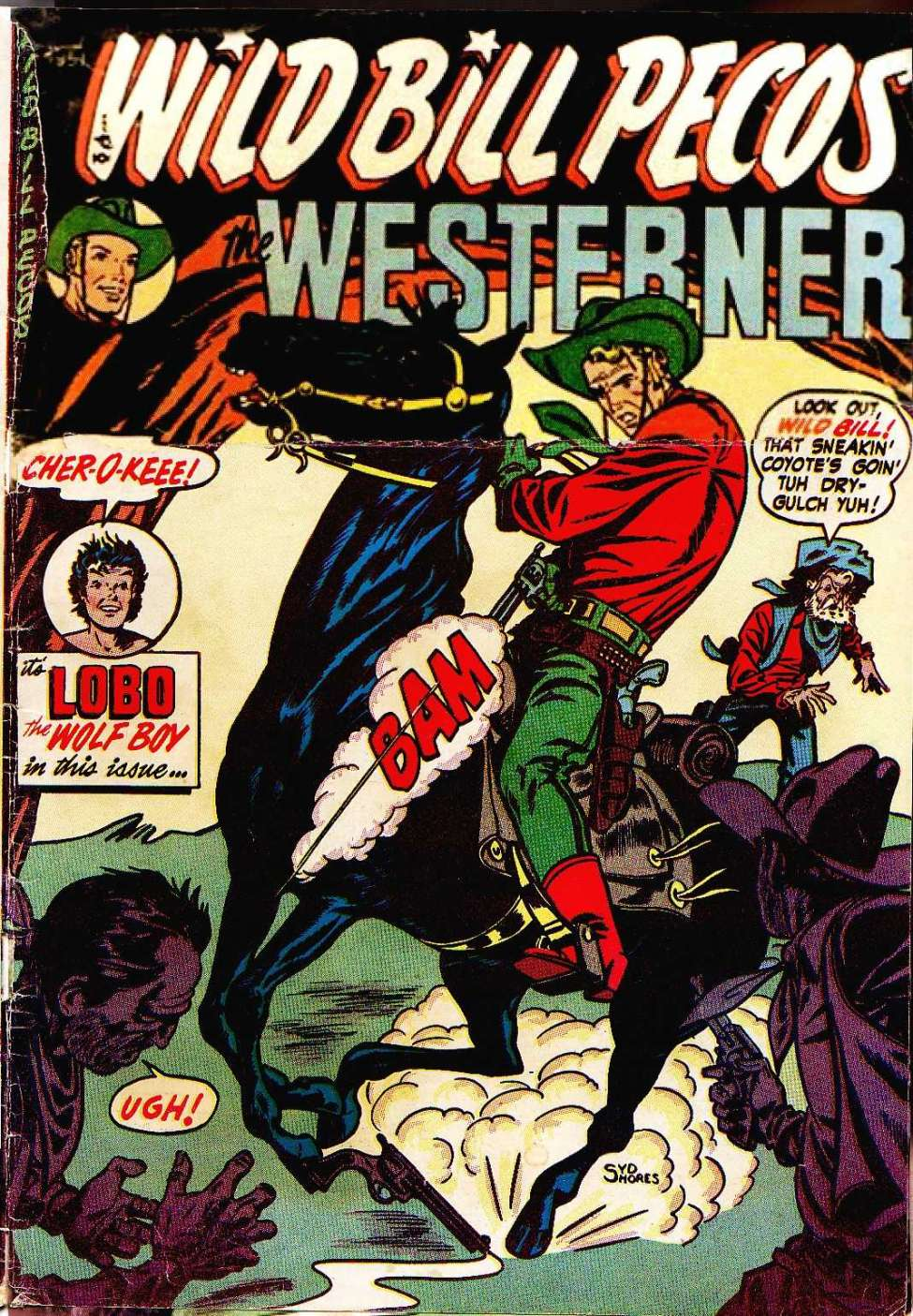
- Status: Defunct (1955)
- Founded: 1945
- Founder: Ray Herman
- Country of origin: United States
- Headquarters location: 1819 Broadway, New York City
- Publication types: Comic books
- Fiction genres: romance, crime, Western, humor
- Imprints: Our Publishing Co. Patches Publications, Inc. Taffy Publications, Inc. Toytown Publications, Inc. Wanted Comic Group
- Owners: Ray Herman and Marjorie May

Orbit Publications, also known as Orbit-Wanted, was an American comic book publishing house operated by the female publisher, editor, and cartoonist Ray Herman during the Golden Age of Comic Books. The company was co-owned by Herman and Marjorie May (niece of World Color Press owner Roswell Messing, Sr.).

Orbit operated from 1945 to 1955; the company's longest-running titles were Wanted Comics (crime), The Westerner (a Western title featuring Wild Bill Pecos) and Love Diary (romance); contributing artists included John Buscema, Syd Shores, Bernard Krigstein and Mort Leav.

Orbit was a founding member of the Association of Comics Magazine Publishers (the precursor to the Comics Magazine Association of America), for which Hermann served as secretary and board director.

== Titles published ==
- Love Diary (48 issues, July 1949 - September-October 1955) — romance
- Love Journal (16 issues, October 1951 - July 1954) – romance
- Patches (11 issues, [July] 1945 - December 1947) — Western title continued from Rural Home Publications title
- Taffy Comics (10 issues, 1946 - February 1948) — funny animal title continued from Rural Home
- Toytown Comics (5 issues, Aug. 1946–May 1947) — humor title continued from B. Antin series
- Wanted Comics (45 issues, September-October 1947 - April 1953) — crime comic; numbering continued from Toytown
- The Westerner Comics (28 issues, June 1948 - December 1951) — Western title
