= EC Comics =

Former American publisher

E.C. Publications, Inc.
- Trade name: EC Comics
- Type: Subsidiary
- Industry: Publishing
- Genre: Romance; crime; War; Fantasy; Western; Talking animal; Horror; Science fiction; Satire; Adventure
- Founded: 1944; 82 years ago
- Founder: Max Gaines
- Headquarters: New York City, New York, U.S.
- Key people: Max Gaines; William Gaines
- Products: Comics
- Owner: DC Comics (company); Gaines family (brand)

E.C. Publications, Inc. (doing business as EC Comics), is an American comic book publisher. It specialized in horror fiction, crime fiction, satire, military fiction, dark fantasy, and science fiction from the 1940s through the mid-1950s, notably the Tales from the Crypt series. Initially, EC was founded as Educational Comics by Maxwell Gaines and specialized in educational and child-oriented stories. After Max Gaines died in a boating accident in 1947, his son William Gaines took over the company and renamed it Entertaining Comics. He printed more mature stories, delving into horror, war, fantasy, science-fiction, adventure, and other genres. Noted for their high quality and shock endings, these stories were also unique in their socially conscious, progressive themes (including racial equality, anti-war advocacy, nuclear disarmament, and environmentalism) that anticipated the Civil Rights Movement and the dawn of the 1960s counterculture. In 1954–55, censorship pressures prompted it to concentrate on the humor magazine Mad, leading to the company's greatest and most enduring success. Consequently, by 1956, the company ceased publishing all its comic lines except Mad.

== History ==
=== 1944–1950: Founding of publisher as Educational Comics ===
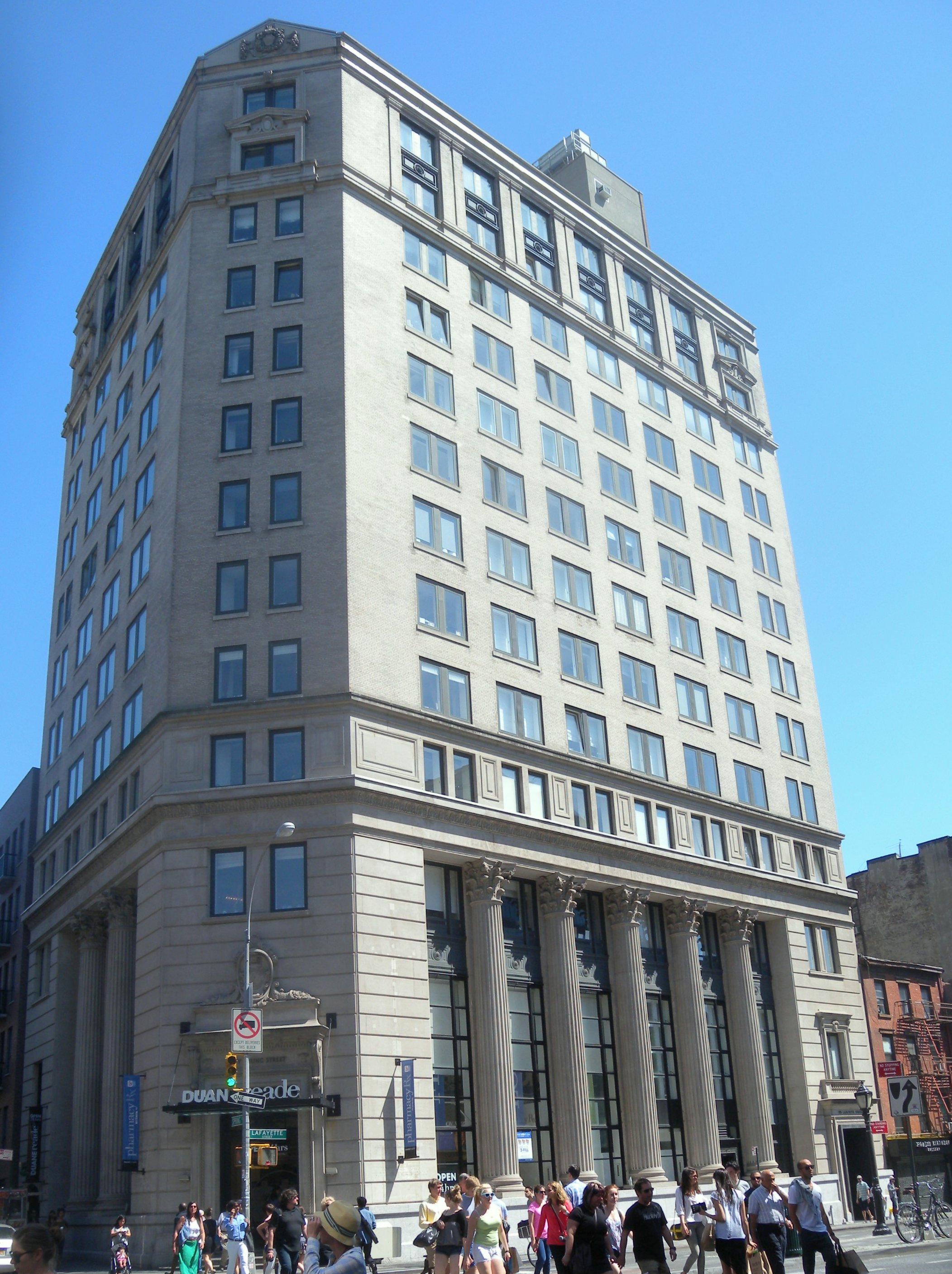
225 Lafayette Street, home of EC Comics

The firm, first known as Educational Comics, was founded by Max Gaines, former editor of the comic-book company All-American Publications, and it was initially a shell company of All-American. When that company merged with DC Comics in June 1945, Gaines retained rights to the comic book Picture Stories from the Bible, and began his new company using the EC name with a plan to market comics about science, history, and the Bible to schools and churches, and soon expanded to produce children's humor titles. A decade earlier, Max Gaines had been one of the pioneers of the comic book form, with Eastern Color Printing's proto-comic book Funnies on Parade, and with Dell Publishing's Famous Funnies: A Carnival of Comics, considered by historians the first true American comic book.

At the time of Gaines' death in 1947, the company was $100,000 in debt.

=== 1950–1955: Rebranded as Entertaining Comics, introduction to "New Trend" ===
When Max Gaines died in 1947 in a boating accident, his son William inherited the comics company. After four years (1942–1946) in the Army Air Corps, Gaines had returned home to finish school at New York University, planning to work as a chemistry teacher. He never taught but instead took over the family business. In 1949 and 1950, Bill Gaines began a line of new titles featuring horror, suspense, science fiction, military fiction and crime fiction. His editors, Al Feldstein and Harvey Kurtzman, who also drew covers and stories, gave assignments to such prominent and highly accomplished freelance artists as Johnny Craig, Reed Crandall, Jack Davis, Will Elder, George Evans, Frank Frazetta, Graham Ingels, Jack Kamen, Bernard Krigstein, Joe Orlando, John Severin, Al Williamson, Basil Wolverton, and Wally Wood. With input from Gaines, the stories were written by Kurtzman, Feldstein, and Craig. Other writers, including Carl Wessler, Jack Oleck, and Otto Binder, were later brought on board.

EC succeeded with its fresh approach and pioneered forming relationships with its readers through its letters to the editor and fan organization, the National EC Fan-Addict Club. EC Comics promoted its stable of illustrators, allowing each to sign his art and encouraging them to develop distinctive styles; the company published one-page biographies of them in comic books. This was in contrast to the industry's common practice, in which credits were often missing, although some artists at other companies, such as the Jack Kirby – Joe Simon team, Jack Cole and Bob Kane had been prominently promoted.

EC published distinct lines of titles under its Entertaining Comics umbrella. Most notorious were its horror books, Tales from the Crypt, The Vault of Horror, and The Haunt of Fear. These titles reveled in a gruesome joie de vivre, with grimly ironic fates meted out to many of the stories' protagonists. The company's war comics, Frontline Combat and Two-Fisted Tales, often featured weary-eyed, unheroic stories out of step with the jingoistic times. Shock SuspenStories tackled weighty political and social issues such as racism, sex, drug use, and the American way of life. EC always claimed to be "proudest of our science fiction titles", with Weird Science and Weird Fantasy publishing stories unlike the space opera found in such titles as Fiction House's Planet Comics. Crime SuspenStories had many parallels with film noir. As noted by Max Allan Collins in his story annotations for Russ Cochran's 1983 hardcover reprint of Crime SuspenStories, Johnny Craig had developed a "film noir-ish bag of effects" in his visuals, while characters and themes found in the crime stories often showed the strong influence of writers associated with film noir, notably James M. Cain. Craig excelled in drawing stories of domestic scheming and conflict, leading David Hajdu to observe:

To young people of the postwar years, when the mainstream culture glorified suburban domesticity as the modern American ideal – the life that made the Cold War worth fighting – nothing else in the panels of EC comics, not the giant alien cockroach that ate earthlings, not the baseball game played with human body parts, was so subversive as the idea that the exits of the Long Island Expressway emptied onto levels of Hell.

Superior illustrations of stories with surprise endings became EC's trademark. Gaines would generally stay up late and read large amounts of material while seeking "springboards" for story concepts. The next day he would present each premise until Feldstein found one that he thought he could develop into a story. At EC's peak, Feldstein edited seven titles while Kurtzman handled three. Artists were assigned stories specific to their styles; for example, Davis and Ingels often drew gruesome, supernatural-themed stories, while Kamen and Evans did tamer material.

With hundreds of stories written, common themes surfaced. Some of EC's more well-known themes include:

- An ordinary situation given an ironic and gruesome twist, often as poetic justice for a character's crimes. In "Collection Completed", a man takes up taxidermy to annoy his wife. When he kills and stuffs her beloved cat, the wife snaps and kills him, stuffing and mounting his body. In "Revulsion", a spaceship pilot is bothered by insects due to an experience when he found one in his food. After the story, a giant alien insect screams in horror at finding the dead pilot in his salad. Dissection, the boiling of lobsters, Mexican jumping beans, fur coats, and fishing are just a small sample of the kind of situations and objects used in this fashion.
- The "Grim Fairy Tale", featuring gruesome interpretations of such fairy tales as "Hansel and Gretel", "Sleeping Beauty", and "Little Red Riding Hood".
- Siamese twins were a popular theme, primarily in EC's three horror comics. No fewer than nine Siamese twin stories appeared in EC's horror and crime comics from 1950 to 1954. In an interview, Feldstein speculated that he and Gaines wrote so many Siamese twin stories because of the interdependence they had on each other.
- Adaptations of Ray Bradbury science-fiction stories appeared in two dozen EC comics starting in 1952. It began inauspiciously, with an incident in which Feldstein and Gaines plagiarized two of Bradbury's stories and combined them into a single tale. Learning of the story, Bradbury sent a note praising them, while remarking that he had "inadvertently" not yet received his payment for their use. EC sent a check and negotiated a productive series of Bradbury adaptations.
- Stories with a political message, which became common in EC's science fiction and suspense comics. Among the many topics were lynching, antisemitism, and police corruption.

The three horror titles featured stories introduced by a trio of horror hosts: The Crypt Keeper introduced Tales from the Crypt; The Vault-Keeper welcomed readers to The Vault of Horror; and the Old Witch cackled over The Haunt of Fear. Besides gleefully recounting the unpleasant details of the stories, the characters squabbled with one another, unleashed an arsenal of puns, and even insulted and taunted the readers: "Greetings, boils and ghouls..." This irreverent mockery of the audience also became the trademark attitude of Mad, and such glib give-and-take was later mimicked by many, including Stan Lee at Marvel Comics.

EC's most enduring legacy came with Mad, which started as a side project for Kurtzman before buoying the company's fortunes and becoming one of the country's most notable and long-running humor publications. When satire became an industry rage in 1954, and other publishers created imitations of Mad, EC introduced a sister title, Panic, edited by Al Feldstein and using the regular Mad artists plus Joe Orlando.

=== 1955–1956: "New Direction" and "Picto-Fiction" ===
EC shifted its focus to a line of more realistic comic book titles, including M.D. and Psychoanalysis (known as the New Direction line). It also renamed its remaining science-fiction comic. Since the initial issues did not carry the Comics Code seal, the wholesalers refused to carry them. After consulting with his staff, Gaines reluctantly started submitting his comics to the Comics Code; all the New Direction titles carried the seal starting with the second issue. This attempted revamp failed commercially and after the fifth issue, all the New Direction titles were canceled. Incredible Science Fiction #33 was the last EC comic book published.

Gaines switched focus to EC's Picto-Fiction titles, a line of typeset black-and-white magazines with heavily illustrated stories. Fiction was formatted to alternate illustrations with blocks of typeset text, and some of the contents were rewrites of stories previously published in EC's comic books. This experimental line lost money from the start and only lasted two issues per title. When EC's national distributor went bankrupt, Gaines dropped all of his titles except Mad.

=== 1960–1989: Acquisition by Kinney, focus on MAD and other licensing ===
Mad sold well throughout the company's troubles, and Gaines focused exclusively on publishing it in magazine form. This move was to reconcile its editor Harvey Kurtzman, who had received an offer to join the magazine Pageant, but preferred to remain in charge of his magazine. The switch also removed Mad from the auspices of the Comics Code. Kurtzman, regardless, left Mad soon afterward when Gaines would not give him 51 percent control of the magazine, and Gaines brought back Al Feldstein as Kurtzman's successor. The magazine enjoyed great success for decades afterward.

Gaines sold the company in the 1960s as E.C. Publications, Inc., and was eventually absorbed into the same corporation that later purchased National Periodical Publications (later known as DC Comics).

During the 1960s, Gaines granted Bob Barrett, Roger Hill, and Jerry Norton Weist (1949–2011), the co-founder of Million Year Picnic, permission to produce a EC Comics fanzine "Squa Tront" (1967 - 1983) that would last for several years. In June 1967, Kinney National Company (it formed on August 12, 1966, after Kinney Parking/National Cleaning merge) bought National Periodical and E.C., then it purchased Warner Bros.-Seven Arts in early 1969. Due to a financial scandal involving price fixing in its parking operations, Kinney Services spun off its non-entertainment assets as National Kinney Corporation in September 1971, and it changed names to Warner Communications on February 10, 1972.

The Tales from the Crypt title was licensed for a movie of that name in 1972. This was followed by another film, The Vault of Horror, in 1973. The omnibus movies Creepshow (1982) and Creepshow 2, while using original scripts written by Stephen King and George A. Romero, were inspired by EC's horror comics. Creepshow 2 included animated interstitial material between vignettes, featuring a young protagonist who goes to great length to acquire and keep possession of an issue of the comic book Creepshow.

In 1989, Tales from the Crypt began airing on the U.S. cable-TV network HBO. The series ran through 1996, comprising 93 episodes and seven seasons. Tales from the Crypt spawned two children's television series on broadcast TV, Tales from the Cryptkeeper and Secrets of the Cryptkeeper's Haunted House. It also spawned three "Tales from the Crypt"-branded movies, Demon Knight, Bordello of Blood, and Ritual. In 1997, HBO followed the TV series with the similar Perversions of Science (comprising 10 episodes), the episodes of which were based on stories from EC's Weird Science.

=== 1973–2013: Focus on reprints ===
Although the last non-Mad EC publication came out in 1956, EC Comics have remained popular for half a century, due to reprints that have kept them in the public eye. In 1964–1966, Ballantine Books published five black-and-white paperbacks of EC stories: Tales of the Incredible showcased EC science fiction, while the paperbacks Tales from the Crypt and The Vault of Horror reprinted EC horror tales. EC's Ray Bradbury adaptations were collected in The Autumn People (horror and crime) and Tomorrow Midnight (science fiction).

The EC Horror Library (Nostalgia Press, 1971) featured 23 EC stories selected by Bhob Stewart and Bill Gaines, with an introduction by Stewart and an essay by theater critic Larry Stark. One of the first books to reprint comic book stories in color throughout, it followed the original color guides by Marie Severin. In addition to the stories from EC's horror titles, the book also included Bernard Krigstein's famous "Master Race" story from Impact and the first publication of Angelo Torres' "An Eye for an Eye", originally slated for the final issue of Incredible Science Fiction but rejected by the Comics Code.

East Coast Comix reprinted several of EC's New Trend comics in comic form between 1973 and 1975. The first reprint was the final issue of Tales from the Crypt, with the title revised to state The Crypt of Terror. This issue was originally meant to be the first issue of a fourth horror comic which was changed to the final issue of Tales from the Crypt at the last minute when the horror comics were cancelled in 1954. A dozen issues ended up being reprinted.

Russ Cochran reprints include EC Portfolios, The Complete EC Library, EC Classics, RCP Reprints (Russ Cochran), EC Annuals, and EC Archives (hardcover books). The EC full-color hardcovers were under the Gemstone imprint. Dark Horse continued this series in the same format.

In February 2010, IDW Publishing began publishing a series of Artist's Editions books in 15" × 22" format, which consist of scans of the original inked comic book art, including pasted lettering and other editorial artifacts that remain on the original pages. Subsequent EC books in the series included a collection of Wally Wood's EC comic stories, a collection of stories from Mad, and books collecting the work of Jack Davis and Graham Ingels.

In 2012, Fantagraphics Books began a reprint series called The EC Artists' Library featuring the comics published by EC, releasing each book by artist. This collection is printed in black and white.

In 2013, Dark Horse Comics began reprinting the EC Archives in hardcover volumes, picking up where Gemstone left off, and using the same hardcover full-color format. The first volume to be reprinted was Tales from the Crypt: Volume 4, with an essay by Cochran.

=== 2024–present: Return to comics ===
In February 2024, Oni Press announced that it will revive the brand, starting with horror title Epitaphs from the Abyss and the science fiction title Cruel Universe.

The Gaines family licenses the titles.

== Criticisms and controversies ==
Beginning in the late 1940s, the comic book industry became the target of mounting public criticism for the content of comic books and their potentially harmful effects on children. The problem came to a head in 1948 with the publication by Dr. Fredric Wertham of two articles: "Horror in the Nursery" (in Collier's) and "The Psychopathology of Comic Books" (in the American Journal of Psychotherapy). As a result, an industry trade group, the Association of Comics Magazine Publishers, was formed in 1948 but proved ineffective. EC left the association in 1950 after Gaines argued with its executive director, Henry Schultz. By 1954 only three comic publishers were still members, and Schultz admitted that the ACMP seals placed on comics were meaningless.

In 1954, the publication of Wertham's Seduction of the Innocent and a highly publicized Congressional hearing on juvenile delinquency cast comic books in an especially poor light. At the same time, a federal investigation led to a shakeup in the distribution companies that delivered comic books and pulp magazines across America. Sales plummeted, and several companies went out of business.

Gaines called a meeting of his fellow publishers and suggested that the comic book industry gather to fight outside censorship and help repair the industry's damaged reputation. They formed the Comics Magazine Association of America and its Comics Code Authority. The CCA code expanded on the ACMP's restrictions. Unlike its predecessor, the CCA code was rigorously enforced, with all comics requiring code approval before their publication. This not being what Gaines intended, he refused to join the association. Among the Code's new rules were that no comic book title could use the words "horror" or "terror" on its cover. When distributors refused to handle many of his comics, Gaines ended publication of his three horror and the two SuspenStory titles on September 14, 1954.

=== "Judgment Day" ===
"Judgment Day" was first published in Weird Fantasy #18 (April 1953).

Gaines waged several battles with the Comics Code Authority to keep his magazines free from censorship. In one particular example noted by comics historian Digby Diehl, Gaines threatened Judge Charles Murphy, the Comics Code Administrator, with a lawsuit when Murphy ordered EC to alter the science-fiction story "Judgment Day", in Incredible Science Fiction #33 (February 1956). The story, by the writer Al Feldstein and artist Joe Orlando, was a reprint from the pre-Code Weird Fantasy #18 (April 1953), inserted when the Code Authority had rejected an initial, original story, "An Eye for an Eye", drawn by Angelo Torres, but was itself also "objected to" because of "the central character being Black".

The story depicted a human astronaut, a representative of the Galactic Republic, visiting the planet Cybrinia, inhabited by robots. He finds the robots divided into functionally identical orange and blue races, with one having fewer rights and privileges than the other. The astronaut determines that due to the robots' bigotry, the Galactic Republic should not admit the planet until these problems are resolved. In the final panel, he removes his helmet, revealing he is a Black man. Murphy demanded, without any authority in the Code, that the Black astronaut had to be removed.

As Diehl recounted in Tales from the Crypt: The Official Archives:

This really made 'em go bananas in the Code czar's office. "Judge Murphy was off his nut. He was really out to get us", recalls [EC editor] Feldstein. "I went in there with this story and Murphy says, 'It can't be a Black man'. But ... but that's the whole point of the story!" Feldstein sputtered. When Murphy continued to insist that the Black man had to go, Feldstein put it on the line. "Listen", he told Murphy, "you've been riding us and making it impossible to put out anything at all because you guys just want us out of business". [Feldstein] reported the results of his audience with the czar to Gaines, who was furious [and] immediately picked up the phone and called Murphy. "This is ridiculous!" he bellowed. "I'm going to call a press conference on this. You have no grounds, no basis, to do this. I'll sue you". Murphy made what he surely thought was a gracious concession. "All right. Just take off the beads of sweat". At that, Gaines and Feldstein both went ballistic. "Fuck you!" they shouted into the telephone in unison. Murphy hung up on them, but the story ran in its original form.

Feldstein, interviewed for the book Tales of Terror: The EC Companion, reiterated his recollection of Murphy making the request:

So he said it can't be a Black [person]. So I said, "For God's sakes, Judge Murphy, that's the whole point of the Goddamn story!" So he said, "No, it can't be a Black". Bill [Gaines] just called him up [later] and raised the roof, and finally they said, "Well, you gotta take the perspiration off". I had the stars glistening in the perspiration on his Black skin. Bill said, "Fuck you", and he hung up.

== See also ==
- Atom Age of Comic Books
