= Tales from the Crypt (comics) =

American horror comic anthology series

- Tales from the Crypt #24 (June/July 1951); Cover art by Al Feldstein

Publication information
- Publisher: EC Comics
- Schedule: Bi-monthly
- Format: Anthology
- Genre: Horror
- Publication date: (vol. 1); EC Comics: April/May 1950 – February/March 1955; (vol. 2); Papercutz: June 2007 – September 2010; (vol. 3); Super Genius Comics: November 2016 – March 2017
- No. of issues: (vol. 1): 30 (including 3 as The Crypt of Terror); (vol. 2): 13; (vol. 3): 2
- Main character(s): The Crypt-Keeper; The Old Witch; The Vault-Keeper

Creative team
- Created by: Bill Gaines; Al Feldstein

Tales from the Crypt is an American bi-monthly horror comic anthology series that was published by EC Comics from 1950 to 1955 created by Bill Gaines and Al Feldstein. The magazine began in March 1947 as International Comics. It continued under this title for five issues before becoming International Crime Patrol (#6) and Crime Patrol (#7–16). It was retitled The Crypt of Terror with issue #17 (April/May 1950). Two more issues were published under this title before it was rebranded as Tales from the Crypt for issue #20 (October/November 1950). The comic bore this title for 27 issues until being discontinued after issue #46 (February/March 1955).

Along with The Haunt of Fear and The Vault of Horror, it formed a trifecta of popular EC horror anthologies. Publication ceased, however, after horror and crime comics came under scrutiny for an alleged link to juvenile delinquency and the subsequent imposition of a highly restrictive Comics Code.

Tales from the Crypt has since been reprinted in single issues and collected volumes. It has spawned various movies and television series, including a 1972 film and a television series that aired on HBO from 1989 to 1996. The title was revived for a second volume by Papercutz (2007–2010) and for a third by Super Genius Comics (2016–2017).

== Publication history ==
=== Original run ===
The Crypt of Terror #17 (April/May 1950), cover art by Johnny Craig

In 1950, EC Comics publisher Bill Gaines and his editor, Al Feldstein, began experimenting with horror tales in their crime titles. Tales from the Crypt traces its origin to a Feldstein story, "Return from the Grave!", in EC's Crime Patrol #15 (December 1949/January 1950) with the Crypt-Keeper making his debut as teller of the tale. Issue #16 featured more horror tales than crime stories, and, with issue #17, the title changed from Crime Patrol to The Crypt of Terror. Due to an attempt to save money on second-class postage permits, the numbering did not change with the title and continued as The Crypt of Terror for the next two issues.

Tales from the Crypt debuted with issue #20 (October/November 1950) and continued to run for a total of 27 issues (excluding the initial three, #17–19, published as The Crypt of Terror) before ceasing publication with issue #46 (February/March 1955). Along with its sister titles, The Haunt of Fear and The Vault of Horror, Tales from the Crypt was popular, but in the late 1940s and early 1950s comic books came under attack from parents, clergymen, schoolteachers, and others who believed the magazines contributed to illiteracy and juvenile delinquency. In April and June 1954, highly publicized congressional subcommittee hearings on the effects of comic books upon children left the industry shaken. With the subsequent imposition of a highly restrictive Comics Code, EC Comics publisher Bill Gaines cancelled Tales from the Crypt and its two companion horror titles.

==== Reprints ====
Tales from the Crypt has been reprinted on numerous occasions. Ballantine Books reprinted selected stories in a series of paperback anthologies from 1964 to 1966. The magazine was fully collected in a series of five black-and-white hardbacks by publisher Russ Cochran as part of The Complete EC Library in 1979. Cochran (in association with Gladstone Publishing and solo) reprinted a handful of single issues in color from 1990 to 1991. Between 1992 and 1999, Cochran and Gemstone Publishing reprinted the full 30 individual issues. This complete run was later rebound, with covers included, in a series of six softcover EC Annuals. In 2007, Cochran and Gemstone began to publish hardcover, re-colored volumes of Tales from the Crypt as part of the EC Archives series. Three volumes (of a projected five) were published before Gemstone's financial troubles left the project in limbo. The series was revived by Dark Horse Comics, which published the last two volumes in 2013 and 2014. These were later republished as over-sized trade paperbacks from 2021 to 2025.

=== Revivals ===
Papercutz began running a new series of original Tales from the Crypt comics in 2007. The first issue was published in June 2007 with a cover drawn by Kyle Baker. All three of EC Comics' horror hosts (the GhouLunatics) appear in the issue, drawn by Rick Parker. Contributors to subsequent issues included brothers Joe R. Lansdale and John L. Lansdale, Don McGregor, husband and wife team James Romberger and Marguerite Van Cook, Mort Todd, and Chris Noeth. The run consisted of 13 issues, each featuring 2 stories. There was also a run of 9 collections, released in smaller digest size with a graphic novel style bookbinding. They not only collected all of the stories from the issues, but also 10 new stories, and 1 "classic" story from the original run. The last release from Papercutz was published in September 2010.

Super Genius Comics relaunched Tales from the Crypt for two issues in November 2016 and March 2017.

== Production ==
=== Creative team ===
Early covers were created by Al Feldstein, Johnny Craig, and Wally Wood, with the remaining covers (1952–55) by Jack Davis. The contributing interior artists were Feldstein, Craig, Wood, Davis, George Evans, Jack Kamen, Graham Ingels, Harvey Kurtzman, Al Williamson, Joe Orlando, Reed Crandall, Bernard Krigstein, Will Elder, Fred Peters, and Howard Larsen. Davis took over the art for the Crypt-Keeper's stories with #24 (June/July 1951) and continued as the title's lead artist for the rest of the run. Feldstein devised the Crypt-Keeper's origin story, "Lower Berth!" (#33), which was illustrated by Davis. Issue #38 was one of two covers from EC's horror comics censored prior to publication. While The Vault of Horror cover for issue #32 was restored in Russ Cochran's EC Library reprints, the Tales from the Crypt cover remained censored. "Kamen's Kalamity" (#31) starred many members of the EC staff, including Gaines, Feldstein, and the story's artist, Kamen. Ingels, Davis, and Craig also made cameo appearances in the story in single panels which they drew themselves.

=== Influences and adaptations ===
As with the other EC comics edited by Feldstein, the stories in this comic were primarily based on Gaines using existing horror stories and films to develop "springboards" from which he and Feldstein could launch new stories. Specific story influences that have been identified include the following:

- "Death Must Come" (#17): Ralph Murphy's The Man in Half Moon Street
- "The Maestro's Hand" (#18): Robert Florey's The Beast with Five Fingers
- "The Thing from the Sea" (#20): Francis Marion Crawford's "The Upper Berth"
- "Rx Death" (#20): Arthur Machen's "The Novel of the White Powder"
- "Impending Doom" (#20): W. F. Harvey's "August Heat"
- "Reflection of Death" (#23): H. P. Lovecraft's "The Outsider"
- "The Living Death" (#24): Edgar Allan Poe's "The Facts in the Case of M. Valdemar"
- "Judy, You're Not Yourself Tonight" (# 25): H. P. Lovecraft's "The Thing on the Doorstep"
- "Loved to Death" (#25): John Collier's "The Chaser"
- "Bargain in Death!" (#28): Ambrose Bierce's "One Summer Night"
- "Grounds... for Horror!" (#29) – John Collier's "Thus I Refute Beelzy"
- "A Hollywood Ending" (#30): H. P. Lovecraft's "Cool Air"
- "Mirror, Mirror on the Wall" (#34): H. P. Lovecraft's "The Outsider" and Mary Shelley's Frankenstein
- "Dead Right!" (#37): Joseph Sheridan Le Fanu's "The Room in the Dragon Volant"
- "Last Laugh" (#38): David H. Keller's "The Doorbell"
- "Shadow of Death" (#39): Carl Theodor Dreyer's Vampyr

Anecdotes from Bennett Cerf's Try and Stop Me were sources for stories, including "House of Horror" (#21), "Death Suited Him!" (#21), and "Death's Turn!" (#22).

After their unauthorized adaptation of one of Ray Bradbury's stories in another magazine, Bradbury contacted EC about their plagiarism of his work. They reached an agreement for EC to do authorized versions of Bradbury's short fiction. These official adaptations include:

- "There Was an Old Woman" (#34)
- "The Handler" (#36)

== The Crypt-Keeper ==
The Crypt-Keeper as drawn by Al Feldstein for Crime Patrol #15

Although EC's horror stable consisted of three separate magazines, there was little beyond their titles to distinguish them from one another. Each magazine had its own host, known as a GhouLunatic. The Crypt-Keeper was the primary host of Tales from the Crypt. Hosting duties for any one magazine were typically shared with the hosts of the other two. For example, a single issue of Tales from the Crypt would contain two stories told by the Crypt-Keeper, one by the Vault-Keeper (of The Vault of Horror) and one by the Old Witch (of The Haunt of Fear). The professional rivalry among these three GhouLunatics was often played for comic effect in the letter column.

The Crypt-Keeper was introduced in Crime Patrol #15, and he continued with the magazine through its rebrandings. The character began as a frightening presence in the early issues, shown as a sinister hermit sitting framed in the lightless crypt's half-open door, his face all but hidden by the double curtain of his long white hair. He soon evolved into a more comical horror host, delivering an irreverent and pun-filled commentary to lighten the horrific tone of the stories he introduced.

Occasionally, the Crypt-Keeper would appear as a character as well, often providing the reader a glimpse of his life. "The Lower Berth" (Tales from the Crypt #33) gives an account of the circumstances surrounding his birth. "While the Cat's Away" (The Vault of Horror #34) conducts a tour of his house above and below ground. "Horror Beneath the Streets" (The Haunt of Fear #17) tells how he and his fellow GhouLunatics got their EC publishing contracts.

The Crypt-Keeper also served as the host of EC's 3-D comic book, Three Dimensional Tales from the Crypt of Terror (1954). He was portrayed by Ralph Richardson in the 1972 film and voiced by John Kassir in the 1989 television series.

== List of issues ==
The Crypt of Terror / Tales from the Crypt issues
Issue #	Date	Cover artist	Story title	Story artist	Summary (GhouLunatic host)
17	Apr/May 1950	Johnny Craig	Death Must Come!	Al Feldstein	Freddy has managed to cheat death for many decades by having his old friend, a surgeon, perform transplants on him to replace his organs with those from a younger man. But he has to steal them from corpses, and now he is finding he has less and less time before he needs another operation. (The Crypt-Keeper)
17	Apr/May 1950	Johnny Craig	The Man Who Was Death	Bill Fraccio	A public executioner decides to take the law into his own hands. (No host)
17	Apr/May 1950	Johnny Craig	The Corpse Nobody Knew	George Roussos	A private detective finds himself with a new case to solve when he and his wife rent a hotel room and find an unidentifiable body hidden inside. (No host)
17	Apr/May 1950	Johnny Craig	Curse of the Full Moon!	Johnny Craig	Convinced that he became a werewolf after a mysterious incident during a trip to Europe, Ralph goes to visit his old friend George for help. However, with the full moon rising, he is closer to the truth than he knows. (No host)
18	Jun/July 1950	Johnny Craig	The Maestro's Hand!	Al Feldstein	A surgeon, furious that his fiancee has left him to marry an artistically gifted man, decides to take his revenge by cutting off his love rival's hand. The artist commits suicide, but the severed hand appears to have taken on a life of its own. (The Crypt-Keeper)
18	Jun/July 1950	Johnny Craig	The Living Corpse	Wally Wood	A morgue attendant begins having visions of death which he links to the "Living Corpse", a performance artist who feigns death during his act. (No host)
18	Jun/July 1950	Johnny Craig	Madness at Manderville	Harvey Kurtzman	Marian Mander is convinced she is going insane when she begins to see and hear strange things after her son's death. Her husband is worried about her, but how deep is his own involvement? (No host)
18	Jun/July 1950	Johnny Craig	Mute Witness to Murder!	Johnny Craig	A woman becomes mute with shock after witnessing a doctor murdering his wife. He commits the witness to an insane asylum but then decides he must kill her before she regains her voice. (No host)
19	Aug/Sept 1950	Johnny Craig	Ghost Ship!	Al Feldstein	A couple whose plane went down over the Bermuda Triangle are trapped on a lifeboat in the middle of the ocean. They think they are in luck when they come across a ship; until they find a skeleton tied to the helm. (The Crypt-Keeper)
19	Aug/Sept 1950	Johnny Craig	The Hungry Grave	Graham Ingels	Ida and Jim are plotting to murder Ida's stingy, drunken husband so they can be together. He proves a little harder to kill than they would like. (No host)
19	Aug/Sept 1950	Johnny Craig	Cave Man	Johnny Craig	The young sub-curator of a museum is angry that his own invention is being ignored in favor of a new exhibit: the frozen body of a Neanderthal. The enraged man decides to get even by thawing out the body and leaving it to decompose in the sun, but he does not think to check that the caveman is really dead. (No host)
19	Aug/Sept 1950	Johnny Craig	Zombie!	Johnny Craig	Daniel Richards is staying in Haiti with his wealthy plantation-owner friend. He ignores instructions not to spy on a native voodoo ritual but then notices something very interesting about the photo he took of the event. (No host)
20	Oct/Nov 1950	Johnny Craig	The Thing from the Sea!	Al Feldstein	A you-are-the-main-character story in which you are a man on a sea crossing, forced to take a cabin that is supposedly cursed: everyone who slept in it has either gone crazy or mysteriously left the ship. (The Crypt-Keeper)
20	Oct/Nov 1950	Johnny Craig	A Fatal Caper!	Jack Kamen	Four wealthy, arrogant college students come to bitterly regret playing around with a book of voodoo spells. (No host)
20	Oct/Nov 1950	Johnny Craig	Rx... Death!	Graham Ingels	Janet is worried that her workaholic brother is ruining his health, so she calls in the family doctor to give him a reviving tonic. When he begins going through a monstrous transformation, it is a race against time to find out what was in the tonic. (No host)
20	Oct/Nov 1950	Johnny Craig	Impending Doom!	Johnny Craig	Theodore Warren goes into a trance and draws the face of a terrified-looking man. He is shocked but not as much as when he meets the man in real life—a man who is carving Warren's own name into a tombstone. (No host)
21	Dec/Jan 1951	Al Feldstein	A Shocking Way to Die!	Al Feldstein	A prisoner on death row is visited by a professor who claims to be able to revive him after his death. The prisoner is executed in the electric chair, and the professor brings him back to life. He shoots the professor and goes to take his revenge on the judge who sentenced him to death but finds that he should not have been so hasty. (The Crypt-Keeper)
21	Dec/Jan 1951	Al Feldstein	Terror Ride!	Wally Wood	A couple on their honeymoon come across a deserted amusement park. Only one ride is open, and as they discover, the owner is a little too obsessed with making sure that his "dummies" look perfectly real. (No host)
21	Dec/Jan 1951	Al Feldstein	House of Horror	Harvey Kurtzman	A fraternity boy is determined to terrify the new pledges going through a hazing ritual and makes them go to the top floor of an old house rumoured to be haunted. He gets his comeuppance when the boys disappear and he is sent to find them. Reprinted from The Haunt of Fear #15 (1) (May/Jun 1950). (No host)
21	Dec/Jan 1951	Al Feldstein	Death Suited Him!	Graham Ingels	Larry kills his love rival, John, and as a parting shot is determined to marry John's wife wearing the same tuxedo that John wore at the wedding. Unfortunately, this is what John was buried in, and now Larry has to dig up the body to retrieve it. (The Old Witch)
22	Feb/Mar 1951	Al Feldstein	The Thing from the Grave!	Al Feldstein	Bill is in love with Laura, but Laura loves only Jim. Bill kills Jim and decides he must kill Laura because she knows about the murder. What Bill does not know is that when Jim promised to always protect Laura, he really meant it. (The Crypt-Keeper)
22	Feb/Mar 1951	Al Feldstein	Blood Type "V"!	Graham Ingels	Jean and her lover, Freddie, are involved in a car accident. Jean needs a blood transfusion but no one at the scene is a match until a mysterious stranger appears and volunteers his help. Shortly afterwards, bodies begin turning up in town—drained of their blood. (The Crypt-Keeper)
22	Feb/Mar 1951	Al Feldstein	Death's Turn!	Jack Kamen	The owners of a failing amusement park find themselves in luck when a newcomer agrees to sell them the rights to an amazing new rollercoaster. They decide to save on further costs by not testing the ride for safety, but then when it opens, they are offered the first turn on the new attraction. (The Old Witch)
22	Feb/Mar 1951	Al Feldstein	The Curse of the Arnold Clan!	Johnny Craig	On New Year's Eve, Robert Arnold discovers a book in the attic that tells of a curse on his family: every 50 years, the oldest of the clan will die on New Year's Eve. Robert realizes he is the oldest living Arnold, but he does not believe in the curse. (The Vault-Keeper)
23	Apr/May 1951	Al Feldstein	Reflection of Death!	Al Feldstein	You and your friend, Carl, are on a long drive. While driving, Carl falls asleep at the wheel and crashes the car. You wake up, glad to have survived. But why does everyone you meet run away from you? (The Crypt-Keeper)
23	Apr/May 1951	Al Feldstein	Last Respects!	Graham Ingels	Tony decides to pay his "last respects" to his newly deceased wife but finds himself trapped in the crypt with her body. He is forced to turn to a shocking method of survival. (The Old Witch)
23	Apr/May 1951	Al Feldstein	Seance!	Jack Davis	A man skeptical about the supernatural is talked into attending a seance. He is sure he can trick the medium into proving herself a fake by asking her to channel the spirit of his wife who is still alive. Or is she? (The Crypt-Keeper)
23	Apr/May 1951	Al Feldstein	Voodoo Death!	Johnny Craig	Jay and Bill, visitors to Haiti, are determined to witness a voodoo ritual. But when the locals catch them spying, it is not long before they start seeing strange dolls everywhere. (The Vault-Keeper)
24	Jun/July 1951	Al Feldstein	Bats in My Belfry!	Jack Davis	Harry loses his hearing and with it his job and his wife. An old friend points him in the direction of a man who may be able to help by giving Harry a hearing transplant from a bat. (The Crypt-Keeper)
24	Jun/July 1951	Al Feldstein	The Living Death!	Graham Ingels	Two old friends are doctors who cannot agree whether illness is physical or just in the mind. When one of them is close to death, the other is convinced he can save his old friend through hypnosis, a technique so successful it keeps the patient's heart beating even after his death. (The Old Witch)
24	Jun/July 1951	Al Feldstein	Midnight Snack!	Johnny Craig	Duncan falls asleep while reading a horror story about a ghoul, and when he wakes up, he finds he has a strange new taste in food. (The Vault-Keeper)
24	Jun/July 1951	Al Feldstein	Scared to Death!	Wally Wood	Ralph wants to give his fragile, sickly wife such a fright that it will cause her fatal heart failure, and he can inherit her money, the money she gained when they murdered her wealthy old uncle together. He decides that making her uncle "reappear" will be just the shock to kill her, not knowing that the corpse is already ahead of him. (The Crypt-Keeper)
25	Aug/Sept 1951	Al Feldstein	The Trophy!	Jack Davis	A man who loves to collect hunting "trophies" discovers that it is not just animals that can be hunted. (The Crypt-Keeper)
25	Aug/Sept 1951	Al Feldstein	Judy, You're Not Yourself Today!	Wally Wood	A housewife is terrorized by an evil old witch who switches their bodies leaving the witch alone with the woman's husband. (The Vault-Keeper)
25	Aug/Sept 1951	Al Feldstein	Loved to Death!	Jack Kamen	Eddie is madly in love with a woman who does not return his affections. He meets a mysterious stranger claiming to be an alchemist, who gives Eddie a potion to make the woman fall madly in love with him. The stranger says Eddie will soon be back for the antidote, and Eddie laughs, but soon finds out he should have listened. (The Crypt-Keeper)
25	Aug/Sept 1951	Al Feldstein	The Works... In Wax!	Graham Ingels	Henri Mataud is the proprietor of a wax museum devoted to figurines of famous murderers. He becomes fed up with his wife "ruining" the exhibits by relieving them of their heavy weapons and awkward poses, so he decides to stop her for good, without realizing just how much the figures appreciated her efforts. (The Old Witch)
26	Oct/Nov 1951	Wally Wood	Drawn and Quartered!	Jack Davis	An artist who has been conned out of money goes to a voodoo practitioner in the hope of revenge. (The Crypt-Keeper)
26	Oct/Nov 1951	Wally Wood	The Borrowed Body!	Howard Larsen	Sandra and her lover, Fred, arrange to kill Sandra's husband, but at the same time as she is murdering her husband, Fred is hit by a truck and dies. When Sandra's husband wakes up in Fred's body, he has only one thing on his mind. (The Vault-Keeper)
26	Oct/Nov 1951	Wally Wood	Indian Burial Mound	George Roussos	A man buys a farm which he plans to turn into a flying school, ignoring the old farmhand's instruction not to bulldoze the Native American burial plot on the site. (The Crypt-Keeper)
26	Oct/Nov 1951	Wally Wood	Political Pull!	Graham Ingels	A corrupt politician poisons his rival so he can become the town mayor. His actions quite literally come back to haunt him. (The Old Witch)
27	Dec/Jan 1952	Wally Wood	Well-Cooked Hams!	Jack Davis	Two entrepreneurs want to pay off a French stage magician to perform his wondrous magic tricks on stage in the USA. He refuses, so they kill him and steal his manuscript with the intention of staging his horrific "illusions" themselves. There is just one important detail he left out of the script. (The Crypt-Keeper)
27	Dec/Jan 1952	Wally Wood	Madam Bluebeard	Joe Orlando	A woman whose husbands have all died in mysterious circumstances gets more than she bargained for when she goes to lay flowers at their gravesites. (The Vault-Keeper)
27	Dec/Jan 1952	Wally Wood	Return!	Jack Kamen	Myra is devastated after her husband takes off on an unexpected business trip and never comes back. His business partner returns without him, and Myra discovers that maybe her husband is not quite who she thought he was. (The Crypt-Keeper)
27	Dec/Jan 1952	Wally Wood	Horror! Head... It Off!	Graham Ingels	During the French Revolution, a corrupt duke makes money by taking bribes to save condemned aristocrats from the guillotine but then turns them in to the authorities. But, if a chicken can survive without its head, maybe a human can, too? (The Old Witch)
28	Feb/Mar 1952	Al Feldstein	Bargain in Death!	Jack Davis	Two medical students who are planning to rob a grave so they can save on expenses for their dissection project cross paths with a pair of conmen trying to fake a death. (The Crypt-Keeper)
28	Feb/Mar 1952	Al Feldstein	Ants in Her Trance!	Joe Orlando	A hypnotist's act includes reducing his wife to a near-death state by using his powers to slow her heart. He decides to do this to kill her so he can marry his new girlfriend, but he forgets that there is also a command to revive her. (The Vault-Keeper)
28	Feb/Mar 1952	Al Feldstein	A-Corny Story	Jack Kamen	Arnold takes over his father's business and fires a loyal employee for being too old. The man returns to his native Haiti and sends Arnold a present: a sapling from a magical tree that prevents old age. It works just a bit too well. (The Crypt-Keeper)
28	Feb/Mar 1952	Al Feldstein	The Ventriloquist's Dummy!	Graham Ingels	A seaside resort owner tries to convince his old friend, a once-famous ventriloquist, to come out of retirement and perform at the resort. The dummy is less keen to take part in the act. (The Old Witch)
29	Apr/May 1952	Jack Davis	Grounds... For Horror!	Jack Davis	A child whose abusive stepfather keeps locking him in the closet appears to have found an imaginary friend. He tells his mother that someone really lives inside the closet, someone who wants to punish his stepfather. (The Crypt-Keeper)
29	Apr/May 1952	Jack Davis	A Rottin' Trick!	Joe Orlando	Clint is on the run and asks an old "friend" to help him escape by boat—a friend whose lover he seduced, crippled in an accident, and then abandoned. The friend agrees to help Clint, but Clint did not specify exactly where he wanted to be taken. (The Vault-Keeper)
29	Apr/May 1952	Jack Davis	Board to Death!	Jack Kamen	Myrna has a phobia of being buried alive. Now, her worst fear has come true. Can she escape from the coffin before her oxygen runs out? (The Crypt-Keeper)
29	Apr/May 1952	Jack Davis	A Sucker For a Spider!	Graham Ingels	A greedy businessman who loves spiders uses one of his pets to kill a business associate who was about to expose his embezzlement. On a trip abroad, he finds himself closer to his fanged friends than he could ever have imagined. (The Old Witch)
30	Jun/July 1952	Jack Davis	Gas-tly Prospects!	Jack Davis	A prospector returns from the dead to take revenge on a rival who murdered him to steal his gold. (The Crypt-Keeper)
30	Jun/July 1952	Jack Davis	A Hollywood Ending!	Joe Orlando	A film producer travels to the Arctic on location and falls in love with a beautiful young girl. He wants her to come to Hollywood with him and become a star. The girl's guardian angrily opposes this, and the producer convinces her to run away with him anyway. Once they arrive he discovers a very good reason why she should have stayed at home. (The Vault-Keeper)
30	Jun/July 1952	Jack Davis	Auntie, It's Coal Inside!	Jack Kamen	Seven-year-old Toby lives with his abusive aunt, who beats him for stealing coal from the shed. She eventually decides to put a lock on the coal-bin to keep him out, which backfires when she becomes trapped inside herself. (The Crypt-Keeper)
30	Jun/July 1952	Jack Davis	Mournin', Ambrose...	Graham Ingels	Andrew goes to stay with his wealthy uncle Ambrose, whose other heirs have all mysteriously died after coming to live at Ambrose's mansion. Ambrose seems like a kindly old man, but his wife warns Andrew that something far more sinister is afoot. (The Old Witch)
31	Aug/Sept 1952	Jack Davis	Survival... Or Death!	Jack Davis	The owners of a cargo vessel build a complicated rat trap to catch rodents on their ship, resulting in a device that traps the rats and forces them to kill each other for survival. Luckily, humans are more advanced than this—or so the men think, until their own boat begins to sink. (The Crypt-Keeper)
31	Aug/Sept 1952	Jack Davis	The Thing in the 'Glades!	Al Williamson	A sheriff investigates a series of strange murders in the Everglades. The bodies have been completely ripped apart, but he knows the killings are the work of no ordinary creature. (The Vault-Keeper)
31	Aug/Sept 1952	Jack Davis	Kamen's Kalamity!	Jack Kamen	Cartoonist Jack Kamen gets his own taste of fear when he joins the staff at Tales from the Crypt and has to start illustrating horror stories instead of romances. (The Crypt-Keeper)
31	Aug/Sept 1952	Jack Davis	Buried Treasure!	Graham Ingels	Villagers take revenge on a greedy feudal duke who tortures his subjects to feed his love of jewels. (The Old Witch)
32	Oct/Nov 1952	Jack Davis]	Tain't the Meat... It's the Humanity!	Jack Davis	During World War II, a butcher decides to make money on the black market by selling rotted horse meat as steak, with horrific consequences when townspeople start falling sick. (The Crypt-Keeper)
32	Oct/Nov 1952	Jack Davis]	Roped In!	George Evans	A group of men frame their business partner to cover their own misdeeds but soon find themselves trapped in a "web" of more than just false evidence. (The Vault-Keeper)
32	Oct/Nov 1952	Jack Davis]	Cutting Cards!	Fred Peters	Two obsessive gamblers face off in a "game" to the death. (The Crypt-Keeper)
32	Oct/Nov 1952	Jack Davis]	Squash... Anyone?	Graham Ingels	A circus elephant trainer decides to use his act as a cover to kill his wife so he can marry his new girlfriend. He is not counting on his wife, or the elephant, making a reappearance in the ring—even after they're dead. (The Old Witch)
33	Dec/Jan 1953	Jack Davis	Lower Berth!	Jack Davis	The Crypt Keeper recounts his own origins: born to a 4,000-year-old Egyptian mummy and a dead sideshow freak with two heads. (The Crypt-Keeper)
33	Dec/Jan 1953	Jack Davis	This Trick'll Kill You!	Jack Kamen & George Evans	A greedy couple in India kill a young peasant girl who refuses to tell them the secret of her magic rope trick. They are sure they can work out how to perform it themselves and make their fortune, but did not heed her warning that the rope will take orders from no one but her. (The Vault-Keeper)
33	Dec/Jan 1953	Jack Davis	The Funeral	Jack Kamen	A spoiled young prince loves his elderly nursemaid. When she dies suddenly, the king and queen promise to hold a splendid state funeral. The prince is looking forward to the event until he discovers the nursemaid is not dead at all and decides to take matters into his own hands. (The Crypt-Keeper)
33	Dec/Jan 1953	Jack Davis	None but the Lonely Heart!	Graham Ingels	A con man who seduces elderly women so he can kill them and inherit their money meets his match in a new conquest. (The Old Witch)
34	Feb/Mar 1953	Jack Davis	Mirror, Mirror on the Wall!	Jack Davis	You are the protagonist in a story where you take the place of Frankenstein's monster. (The Crypt-Keeper)
34	Feb/Mar 1953	Jack Davis	Oil's Well That Ends Well!	George Evans	Conmen try to scam a town into believing there is oil buried underneath an old cemetery. (The Vault-Keeper)
34	Feb/Mar 1953	Jack Davis	Attacks of Horror!	Jack Kamen	A selfish king forces his subjects to pay exorbitant taxes to make him rich, until he demands that people lose body parts if they can not pay. Then, his subjects come to claim his own unpaid tax contribution. (The Crypt-Keeper)
34	Feb/Mar 1953	Jack Davis	There Was an Old Woman!	Graham Ingels	A mortician's elderly aunt is very particular about how she wants an embalming to be performed in her house. Namely, the embalming of her own body. (The Old Witch)
35	Apr/May 1953	Jack Davis	By the Fright of the Silvery Moon!	Jack Davis	In the early 1900s, a Hungarian immigrant family is blamed for a series of werewolf attacks in town. (The Crypt-Keeper)
35	Apr/May 1953	Jack Davis	Midnight Mess!	Joe Orlando	A man pays a visit to his sister in a deserted town besieged by vampires, but why does no one come out before dark and what does the local restaurant have to do with it? (The Vault-Keeper)
35	Apr/May 1953	Jack Davis	Busted Marriage!	Jack Kamen	A playboy uses bride and groom voodoo dolls to make a rich, elderly woman marry him so he can get his hands on her money. When he meets a new girlfriend, he uses the dolls to kill his wife, unaware that the doll still holds power even after the death of the real bride. (The Crypt-Keeper)
35	Apr/May 1953	Jack Davis	This Wraps It Up!	Graham Ingels	Explorers uncovering the tomb of an ancient Egyptian pharaoh do not believe in the reported curse of the mummy that lies inside the tomb until they decide to steal the pharaoh's treasures for themselves. (The Old Witch)
36	Jun/July 1953	Jack Davis	Fare Tonight, Followed by Increasing Clottyness...	Jack Davis	You are taxi driver working in a town where a series of recent murders have been attributed to vampires, and you become suspicious of a passenger who seems to know a few too many details about the deaths. (The Crypt-Keeper)
36	Jun/July 1953	Jack Davis	Curiosity Killed...	George Evans	A shrewish housewife investigates when her friend suddenly goes on a long trip without warning and the friend's husband takes up a new interest in carrier pigeons. (The Vault-Keeper)
36	Jun/July 1953	Jack Davis	How Green Was My Alley	Jack Kamen	A bigamist has been living with two separate wives, one of whom loves bowling, while the other loves to play golf. They discover this ruse when they meet in a hotel where their respective tournaments are being held; and decide to take their revenge in a most sporting fashion. (The Crypt-Keeper)
36	Jun/July 1953	Jack Davis	The Handler	Graham Ingels	A vengeful old mortician loves to desecrate the corpses he buries. But, one of them turns out to be not so dead and calls on the others for help. (The Old Witch)
37	Aug/Sept 1953	Jack Davis	Dead Right!	Jack Davis	A doctor goes to extreme lengths to convince a colleague of his medical theories about death. (The Crypt-Keeper)
37	Aug/Sept 1953	Jack Davis	Pleasant Screams!	Joe Orlando	You are a man caught in an endless nightmare: attacked by werewolves, vampires, and zombies, buried alive, and more. Can you work out why you are here and find a way out of this torment? (The Vault-Keeper)
37	Aug/Sept 1953	Jack Davis	Strop! You're Killing Me!	Bill Elder	An arrogant young man takes over a small-town fire department. He decides to kill the only other town fireman, an old man who refuses to retire. The old man is not so eager to give up his job. (The Crypt-Keeper)
37	Aug/Sept 1953	Jack Davis	The Rover Boys	Graham Ingels	A doctor swears vengeance when he is disbarred from practicing. He imprisons the committee members and transplants their brains into dogs, using the animals to make him rich as a sideshow performer. However, their survival instinct is stronger than he thought. (The Old Witch)
38	Oct/Nov 1953	Jack Davis	Tight Grip!	Jack Davis	A swindler marries a wealthy woman for her money and then kills her, disposing of her body in the faithful old trunk that she carries while travelling. The trunk is determined not to let him get away with the murder. (The Crypt-Keeper)
38	Oct/Nov 1953	Jack Davis	...Only Skin Deep!	Reed Crandall	A man falls in love with a woman he met at a masquerade ball, despite never having seen her real face. They agree to unmask each other on their wedding night, but the groom may not be so keen on what he finds under the mask. (The Vault-Keeper)
38	Oct/Nov 1953	Jack Davis	Last Laugh!	Bill Elder	A practical joker visits the doctor for aches and pains caused by constant laughing, little knowing that the doctor was the victim in a prank that went fatally wrong. (The Crypt-Keeper)
38	Oct/Nov 1953	Jack Davis	Mournin' Mess	Graham Ingels	A reporter investigates a series of deaths of homeless people, which he believes are linked to a mysterious charity in aid of street-dwellers. (The Old Witch)
39	Dec/Jan 1954	Jack Davis	Undertaking Palor	Jack Davis	Children overhear a plot between the local doctor and undertaker to make money by poisoning the wealthiest people in town and then charging their families for elaborate funerals. When their latest victim turns out to be the father of one of the boys, the children devise a little scheme of their own. (The Crypt-Keeper)
39	Dec/Jan 1954	Jack Davis	The Craving Grave	Joe Orlando	A lonely grave is filled with the body of an equally lonely woman who was murdered by her niece and nephew. She returns from the grave, which does not want to let her go, but she repays it by filling it with two new corpses. (The Vault-Keeper)
39	Dec/Jan 1954	Jack Davis	The Sleeping Beauty!	Jack Kamen	A macabre twist on the fairy tale, "Sleeping Beauty". (The Crypt-Keeper)
39	Dec/Jan 1954	Jack Davis	Shadow of Death	Graham Ingels	An elderly, paraplegic newspaper seller loses his livelihood when a rival takes over his pitch. He is not able to physically do anything to stop this but his shadow has no such limitations. (The Old Witch)
40	Feb/Mar 1954	Jack Davis	Food for Thought	Jack Davis	Carla is terrorized by her husband, a sadistic sideshow freak with the power of telepathy. He learns that she is having an affair and settles on a plan to kill her lover using a series of local murders as a cover. But Carla finds a way to settle the score—and whoever or whatever committed the murders is still on the loose. (The Crypt-Keeper)
40	Feb/Mar 1954	Jack Davis	Pearly to Dead	George Evans	A diver kills his rival in order to mine an area of abnormally large pearls for himself but finds a surprise waiting for him down in the depths. (The Vault-Keeper)
40	Feb/Mar 1954	Jack Davis	Prairie Schooner	Bernie Krigstein	Ezra, an old sea captain, moves in with his sister, Mildred. He goes insane, having the house remodelled to look like the inside of his ship and treating Mildred as a slave. But when the exertion gives her a fatal heart attack, Ezra finds himself all at sea. (The Crypt-Keeper)
40	Feb/Mar 1954	Jack Davis	Half-Baked!	Graham Ingels	The proprietor of a seafood restaurant, who loves to torture the lobsters he serves, finds out what it is like to be in their place after he kills an associate he had ripped off. (The Old Witch)
41	Apr/May 1954	Jack Davis	Operation Friendship	Jack Davis	Geniuses Andrew and Philip have been best friends all their lives until Philip marries an unscholarly woman and stops spending time with Andrew. Lucky for Andrew, he has devised a way to keep Philip with him forever. (The Crypt-Keeper)
41	Apr/May 1954	Jack Davis	Come Back, Little Linda!	George Evans	The corrupt director of an insane asylum decides to clean the place up before an inspection, but he discovers to his own cost that one inmate may not be so crazy after all. (The Vault-Keeper)
41	Apr/May 1954	Jack Davis	Current Attraction	Jack Kamen	A circus performer's daughter is seduced by a ruffian knife-thrower who is already married. The father hatches a plot to have the man sent away to jail by killing his wife during their act but does not anticipate a last-minute change of circumstances. (The Crypt-Keeper)
41	Apr/May 1954	Jack Davis	Mess Call	Graham Ingels	A German World War I soldier suffering from post-traumatic stress syndrome is relieved from his post and goes to live with a friend, a butcher whose shop is mysteriously full of meat despite wartime rationing. (The Old Witch)
42	Jun/July 1954	Jack Davis	Concerto for Violin and Werewolf	Jack Davis	A violinist undertakes a dangerous journey to visit his old teacher and becomes determined to kill the werewolves that inhabit the surrounding woods. (The Crypt-Keeper)
42	Jun/July 1954	Jack Davis	By the Dawn's Early Light	Jack Kamen	Two friends suspect each other of being the vampire who killed their mutual third friend and many other people in the town. (The Vault-Keeper)
42	Jun/July 1954	Jack Davis	The Bath	Bernie Krigstein	The servant to a plantation owner takes revenge for a family his master killed. (The Crypt-Keeper)
42	Jun/July 1954	Jack Davis	Hoodwinked!	Graham Ingels	A man whose greedy brother has made constant demands on him throughout their lives can take no more when his brother demands an expensive ornament for the hood of his car. (The Old Witch)
43	Aug/Sept 1954	Jack Davis	Four-Way Split	Jack Davis	Roy Dixon committed the perfect murder at Four Corners. All four connecting states have made a bid to send him to death row, but he walked free. So why are his nightmares of execution becoming all too real? (The Crypt-Keeper)
43	Aug/Sept 1954	Jack Davis	Cold War	Jack Kamen	Paul finds himself being threatened at gunpoint by his wife's lover, who does not seem to know there is a very special requirement for joining her family. (The Vault-Keeper)
43	Aug/Sept 1954	Jack Davis	Clots My Line	George Evans	A man takes part in a game show with a sinister twist. (The Crypt-Keeper)
43	Aug/Sept 1954	Jack Davis	Accidents and Old Lace	Graham Ingels	A struggling art dealer tries to take advantage of three old ladies who are able to create wonderful tapestries after they have witnessed a violent accidental death. (The Old Witch)
44	Oct/Nov 1954	Jack Davis	Forever Ambergris	Jack Davis	A ship's captain, who is in love with a crew member's wife, kills her husband by deliberately exposing him to a flesh-eating virus. (The Crypt-Keeper)
44	Oct/Nov 1954	Jack Davis	Burial at Sea	Reed Crandall	You attempt to steal a miser's treasure that he has been bringing up from a shipwreck. You kill him when he gets in your way, but when he said he was ready for you, he was dead right! (The Vault-Keeper)
44	Oct/Nov 1954	Jack Davis	The Proposal	Jack Kamen	Fortune hunter Pearl attempts to seduce a wealthy man and is delighted when he tells her he "wants her for his wife." But what exactly does he mean? (The Crypt-Keeper)
44	Oct/Nov 1954	Jack Davis	The Sliceman Cometh	Graham Ingels	An executioner in post-Revolution France is paid by a corrupt noble's brother to expose the man as a monarchist and have him sent to the guillotine. The executioner saves the man's head as a trophy, but he finds it harder to dispose of than he expected. (The Old Witch)
45	Dec/Jan 1955	Jack Davis	Telescope	Jack Davis	The survivor of a shipwreck becomes caught up in the "food chain" when he finds himself stranded on an island with nothing to eat but a single rat. (The Crypt-Keeper)
45	Dec/Jan 1955	Jack Davis	The Substitute	Jack Kamen	A man serving time on a penal colony makes a plan to escape by killing the governor and taking the corpse's place in the coffin. If only he had stayed around to hear the victim's last request. (The Crypt-Keeper)
45	Dec/Jan 1955	Jack Davis	Murder Dream	Bernie Krigstein	Howard has to leave his beloved wife to go on a business trip, but he begins to suffer from a recurring dream of her being murdered. (The Crypt-Keeper)
45	Dec/Jan 1955	Jack Davis	The Switch	Graham Ingels	A man is trying to woo a much younger woman, who rejects him because of his age. He finds a doctor who can give him the body of a young man again—for a hidden price. (The Old Witch)
46	Feb/Mar 1955	Jack Davis	Upon Reflection	Jack Davis	Local men turn vigilante when the mayor will not help them rid the town of the werewolf that is killing people. The mayor, however, has his own reasons not to get involved. (The Crypt-Keeper)
46	Feb/Mar 1955	Jack Davis	Blind Alleys	George Evans	Inmates at a home for the blind turn the tables on the sadistic overseer and his dog by trapping them in a maze in the basement. (The Vault-Keeper)
46	Feb/Mar 1955	Jack Davis	Success Story	Joe Orlando	Elmer's selfish wife and her freeloading parents have always criticized him for his failure to "get ahead" in life, not realizing how literally he would take their words. (The Crypt-Keeper)
46	Feb/Mar 1955	Jack Davis	Tatter Up!	Graham Ingels	A con man marries a sick old woman for her money but finds out she has a very strange relationship with the local rag man. (The Old Witch)

== In other media ==
The 1972 film Tales from the Crypt, from Amicus Productions, features five stories from EC's horror comics. "Reflection of Death" (#23) and "Blind Alleys" (#46) were adapted from Tales from the Crypt, while the others came from The Haunt of Fear and The Vault of Horror. A second Amicus film, The Vault of Horror (1973), also used stories from Tales from the Crypt: "Midnight Mess" (#35), "This Trick'll Kill You" (#33), "Bargain in Death" (#28), and "Drawn and Quartered" (#26). Another story came from Shock SuspenStories (despite its name, it did not use any stories published in The Vault of Horror).

An homage film entitled Creepshow (1982) followed from Warner Brothers, paying tribute to the tone, look, and feel of Tales from the Crypt and other EC comics without directly adapting any of their stories.

The comic book was adapted into the HBO television series Tales from the Crypt, which features John Kassir as the voice of the Crypt-Keeper and included comic book covers designed by Mike Vosburg—with at least one drawn by Shawn McManus—to look like the original 1950s covers. The series ran for seven seasons from 1989 to 1996 and spawned 93 episodes.

The following tales were used in HBO's Tales from the Crypt TV series: "The Man Who Was Death" (#17), "Mute Witness to Murder" (#18), "Fatal Caper" (#20), "The Thing from the Grave" (#22), "Last Respects" (#23), "Judy, You're Not Yourself Today" (#25), "Loved to Death" (#25), "Well Cooked Hams" (#27), "The Ventriloquist's Dummy" (#28), "Korman's Kalamity" (re-titling of "Kamen's Kalamity", #31), "Cutting Cards" (#32), "Lower Berth" (#33), "None But The Lonely Heart" (#33), "Oil's Well That Ends Well" (#34), "Curiosity Killed" (#36), "Only Skin Deep" (#38), "Mournin' Mess" (#38), "Undertaking Palor" (#39), "Food for Thought" (#40), "Operation Friendship" (#41), "Cold War" (#43), "Forever Ambergris" (#44), "The Switch" (#45), and "Blind Alleys" (#46). Additional episodes were based on other entries in the EC Comics line: The Vault of Horror, The Haunt of Fear, Crime SuspenStories, Shock SuspenStories, and Two-Fisted Tales.

Two films by Universal Pictures, Demon Knight (1995) and Bordello of Blood (1996), were based on the HBO series. A third film, Ritual, was slated for theatrical release in 2002 but was only distributed internationally (without the Tales from the Crypt connection) until 2006, when it was released on DVD in the United States with the Crypt-Keeper segments restored. Unlike the 1970s-era Amicus films, these films were not based on stories from any EC magazine.

HBO's Tales from the Crypt was adapted into a Saturday morning cartoon series called Tales from the Cryptkeeper in 1993. It lacked the violence and other questionable content that was in the original series. Kassir reprised his role as the voice of the Crypt-Keeper. It ran for three seasons from 1993 to 1994 and in 1999, spawning 39 episodes.

In 1994, ACE Games released a board game based on the cartoon called Tales from the Cryptkeeper: Search for the Lost Tales!

A Saturday morning game show, Secrets of the Cryptkeeper's Haunted House, ran from 1996 to 1997 and featured two teams of kids competing in physical games for prizes. The Crypt-Keeper, voiced by Kassir, served as the game's announcer.

A pinball machine, Tales from the Crypt, was produced under license by Data East in 1993. The game incorporates art from the original comics as well as the HBO series.
