= Johnny Craig =

American comic book artist

- Johnny Craig and his wife Toni at an EC Comics Christmas party in the early 1950s
- Born: John Thomas Alexis Craig; April 25, 1926 Pleasantville, New York
- Died: September 13, 2001 (aged 75)
- Areas: Writer, Artist
- Pseudonyms: Jay Taycee; F. C. Aljohn
- Awards: Will Eisner Award Hall of Fame, 2005

John Thomas Alexis Craig (April 25, 1926 – September 13, 2001), was an American comic book artist notable for his work with the EC Comics line of the 1950s. He sometimes used the pseudonyms Jay Taycee and F. C. Aljohn.

== Biography ==
=== Early life and career ===
Born in Pleasantville, New York, Craig studied at the Art Students League of New York. While attending classes, he began working in 1940 as an assistant of Harry Lampert, co-creator of All-American Comics' Golden Age superhero the Flash. The following year, after Lampert was drafted to serve to World War II, All-American editor Sheldon Mayer kept Craig on as an art department assistant, giving him progressively more responsible art duties. Between 1943 and 1945, Craig served in the Merchant Marines and the U.S. Army.

=== EC Comics ===
Returning to comics after his discharge, he began drawing for EC Comics, beginning with the penciling and inking the cover of Moon Girl and the Prince #1 (cover-dated Fall 1947). He did additional work on the following issue of that science fiction / superhero series, now titled simply Moon Girl, and went on to draw stories for the EC Western comics Saddle Justice and Gunfighter and the crime comic Crime Patrol; he later expanded into romance comics with EC's Modern Love Craig additionally did a small amount of early work for Magazine Enterprises, American Comics Group and, tentatively identified through the pen name "Jay", possibly for Eastern Color's New Heroic Comics. When he teamed with Al Feldstein, they used the pseudonym F. C. Aljohn.

Craig later brought a clean, crisp, naturalistic approach to EC's legendary horror series—The Crypt of Terror, The Vault of Horror and The Haunt of Fear — plus Crime SuspenStories and Two-Fisted Tales. Wally Wood once said Craig drew "the cleanest horror stories you ever saw". His first EC horror work came with the cover art for The Crypt of Terror #17 (May 1950) and both the art and script for that issue's seven-page story "Curse of the Full Moon".

In being a writer as well as an artist, Craig differed from the majority of EC artists. He was responsible for the stories hosted by the Vault-Keeper, and he also drew that horror host in the framing sequences of stories by other EC illustrators. He eventually concentrated on The Vault of Horror and Crime SuspenStories, doing the lead story in each of these bimonthly titles.

Craig became the editor of The Vault of Horror early in 1954, giving up his work for Crime SuspenStories at that time. Later that year, he created the Vault Keeper's attractive assistant, Drusilla. After the EC horror books came to an end, Craig edited EC's Extra! in 1955, writing and drawing two stories in each bimonthly issue.

Craig's story "... And All Through the House" in Vault of Horror #35 (March 1954) was adapted for the Joan Collins segment of the 1972 omnibus film Tales from the Crypt. Craig's many covers included that of the infamous Crime SuspenStories #22, shown during the 1950s Senate hearings on juvenile delinquency. U.S. Senator Estes Kefauver asked EC publisher Bill Gaines whether he thought the cover, depicting an ax-wielding man holding a woman's severed head, was in good taste. Gaines responded, "Yes, sir, I do, for the cover of a horror comic"—a remark that became an oft-quoted example of comic books' alleged depravity. Ironically, Craig was one of the more wholesome EC artists, frequently choosing to show the reactions of characters rather than the horrific event itself.

One critic wrote of his work:

Craig was a meticulous craftsman and not a fast worker, but his stories are regarded as some of the best ever in comics. His art was relatively low-key and restrained, effectively staged and featured impeccable draftsmanship. The scripts he wrote tended to be literate and cerebral, and generally relied on solid construction and implacable internal logic, rather than on contrived snap endings. His horror work made more use of psychology and mood than of the supernatural, and his crime comics owed more to James M. Cain and Cornell Woolrich than to gangster movies.

=== Later career ===
After EC's collapse in the wake of the United States Senate Subcommittee on Juvenile Delinquency hearings, Craig worked briefly for Atlas Comics, the 1950s predecessor of Marvel Comics, then spent several successful years at an advertising agency in Pennsylvania, though he lamented that his responsibilities there prevented him from drawing much. He returned to comics in the 1960s with art for ACG's Unknown Worlds and other titles.

His resurfacing prompted Warren Publishing editor Archie Goodwin to have Craig draw for Warren's magazines from 1966 to 1968, during which time Craig (who still worked in advertising) used the pseudonym Jay Taycee, a phonetic pronunciation of his four initials. Of his attempts to work for DC Comics and Marvel Comics, however, comics historian Mark Evanier wrote,

By any name, the work was excellent, but Craig's efforts to work for the "big two" — DC and Marvel — were not as successful. In 1967, he applied at DC. Recalling the excellence of his EC stories, editor George Kashdan gave him an issue of The Brave and the Bold to draw — a Batman/Hawkman team-up. Craig handed the job in weeks late, whereupon his art was deemed too subdued, even for the relatively staid DC super-hero comics of the time. Before publication (in issue #70), the pages were heavily retouched and revised as to expunge any trace of Johnny Craig's style.

Evanier wrote that Goodwin, by now writing for Marvel, said that, "Every so often, we'd try having him pencil an Iron Man or something, but it never worked out. He couldn't draw superheroes the way they wanted, and he couldn't hit the deadlines of a monthly book". After penciling and inking Iron Man #2 and a supernatural story in Tower of Shadows #1, heavily retouched by John Romita Sr., Craig became primarily an inker. He did however complete Iron Man #2–4, 14, 24 and 25, the latter inked by Sam Grainger.

By the early 1980s, Craig stopped drawing for comics and was semi-retired until his death in 2001. He did do many paintings of the Vault-Keeper, Drusilla and other E.C. horror themes, for private commissions, E.C. fanzines and other publications, and these works showed excellent technique in oils. His last known residences were Camp Hill, Pennsylvania, and Shiremanstown, Pennsylvania.

== Awards ==
Craig was posthumously inducted into the Will Eisner Hall of Fame on July 15, 2005, at San Diego Comic-Con.
