= Bernard Krigstein =

20th-century American comics artist

- Krigstein self-portrait
- Born: March 22, 1919 New York City, US
- Died: January 8, 1990 (aged 70) New York City, US
- Areas: Penciller, Inker
- Notable works: "Master Race"
- Awards: Jack Kirby Hall of Fame (1992); Will Eisner Comic Book Hall of Fame (2005)

Bernard Krigstein (/ˈkrɪɡstaɪn/; March 22, 1919 – January 8, 1990) was an American illustrator and gallery artist who received acclaim for his innovative and influential approach to comic book art, notably in EC Comics. His artwork usually displayed the signature B. Krigstein. His best-known work in comic books is the eight-page story "Master Race", originally published in the debut issue (cover-dated April 1955) of EC Comics' Impact.

== Biography ==
Born in Brooklyn, New York City to a Jewish household, Krigstein studied art at Brooklyn College. Krigstein's earliest confirmed work in comics is penciling and inking the 10-page, patriotic "kid gang" feature "The Liberty Lads" in Harvey Comics' Champ Comics #25 (cover-dated April 1943). He went on to draw for Harvey and for Prize Comics through 1943, during the period fans and historians call the Golden Age of Comic Books. Following his service in World War II, he returned to comic books in 1945, working for publishers including Fawcett Comics (1947–48), Novelty/Premium/Curtis (1947), and Hillman Periodicals (1948-51).

In 1952, Krigstein spearheaded an effort by himself and fellow comics artists Arthur Peddy, George Evans and Edd Ashe to found the comics industry's short-lived attempt at a labor union, The Society of Comic Book Illustrators. Peddy served as vice president under Krigstein, with Harry Harrison as secretary, Larry Woromay as treasurer, and Ross Andru, Ernie Bache, John Celardo, Morrie Marcus and Bernard Sachs as members-at-large. The organization went defunct shortly after publication of its third and final newsletter in June 1953. Krigstein began getting less work from his two mainstays — National Comics (the future DC Comics) and Atlas Comics (the future Marvel Comics). But during his presidency of the Society, the politically like-minded publisher of EC Comics, William Gaines, began giving him work (heeding the advice of editor Harvey Kurtzman). At EC, Krigstein "would produce the most acclaimed stories of his career between 1953 and 1955."

Krigstein's best-known work in comic books is editor Al Feldstein's story "Master Race", originally published in the debut issue (April 1955) of EC Comics' Impact. The protagonist is a former Nazi death camp commandant named Reissman who had managed to elude justice until he is spotted ten years later riding the New York City Subway. This story was remarkable for its subject matter, since many have claimed that the Holocaust was rarely discussed in popular media of the 1950s.

Bernard Krigstein's "Master Race" (Impact #1 (April 1955)

Krigstein, who sometimes chafed at the limits of the material EC gave him to illustrate, expanded what had been planned for six pages into an eight-page story. The results were so striking that the company reworked the issue to accommodate the two extra pages. In his expansion, Krigstein had stretched out certain sequences in purely visual terms; repetitive strobe-like drawings mimic the motion of a passing train, and Commandant Reissman's final moment of life is broken down into four individual poses of desperate physical struggle. Art Spiegelman described the effect in The New Yorker: "The two tiers of wordless staccato panels that climax the story... have often been described as 'cinematic', a phrase thoroughly inadequate to the achievement: Krigstein condenses and distends time itself... Reissman's life floats in space like the suspended matter in a lava lamp. The cumulative effect carries an impact—simultaneously visceral and intellectual—that is unique to comics."

In 2018, the original artwork for "Master Race" was bought at auction by the Boon Foundation for Narrative Graphic Arts, located in Belgium, for $600,000.00.

=== Mad ===
Krigstein also did humor, such as "From Eternity Back to Here" in Mad #12, "Bringing Back Father" in Mad #17 and "Crash McCool" in Mad #26.

In the early 1960s, Krigstein left comics in order to draw and paint illustrations for magazines, book jackets (notably, the first edition of Richard Condon's The Manchurian Candidate) and record albums, eventually turning away from commercial assignments in order to focus on fine art. In 1962, he took a position at the High School of Art and Design in Manhattan, where he taught for 20 years.

As Krigstein told a 1962 interviewer, "It's what happens between these panels that's so fascinating. Look at all that dramatic action that one never gets a chance to see. It's between these panels that the fascinating stuff takes place. And unless the artist would be permitted to delve into that, the form must remain infantile."

=== Book illustration ===
Krigstein illustrated:

- Lloyd Alexander, Border Hawk: August Bondi, Farrar, Straus and Cudahy, (1958).
- Evelyn Sibley Lampman, Rusty's Space Ship, Doubleday, (1957)

== Awards ==
Lloyd Alexander's novel, Border Hawk: August Bondi won the National Jewish Book Award for Children's Literature in 1959.

Krigstein was posthumously inducted into the comic book industry's Jack Kirby Hall of Fame in 1992 and the Will Eisner Comic Book Hall of Fame in 2003.

Greg Sadowski's book B. Krigstein, Vol. 1 won the Harvey Award for Best Biographical, Historical, or Journalistic Presentation in 2003, and was also nominated for the Harvey Special Award for Excellence in Presentation in 2003. The book also won the 2003 Eisner Award for Best Comics-Related Publication (Periodical or Book).
