= Al Feldstein =

American comics artist

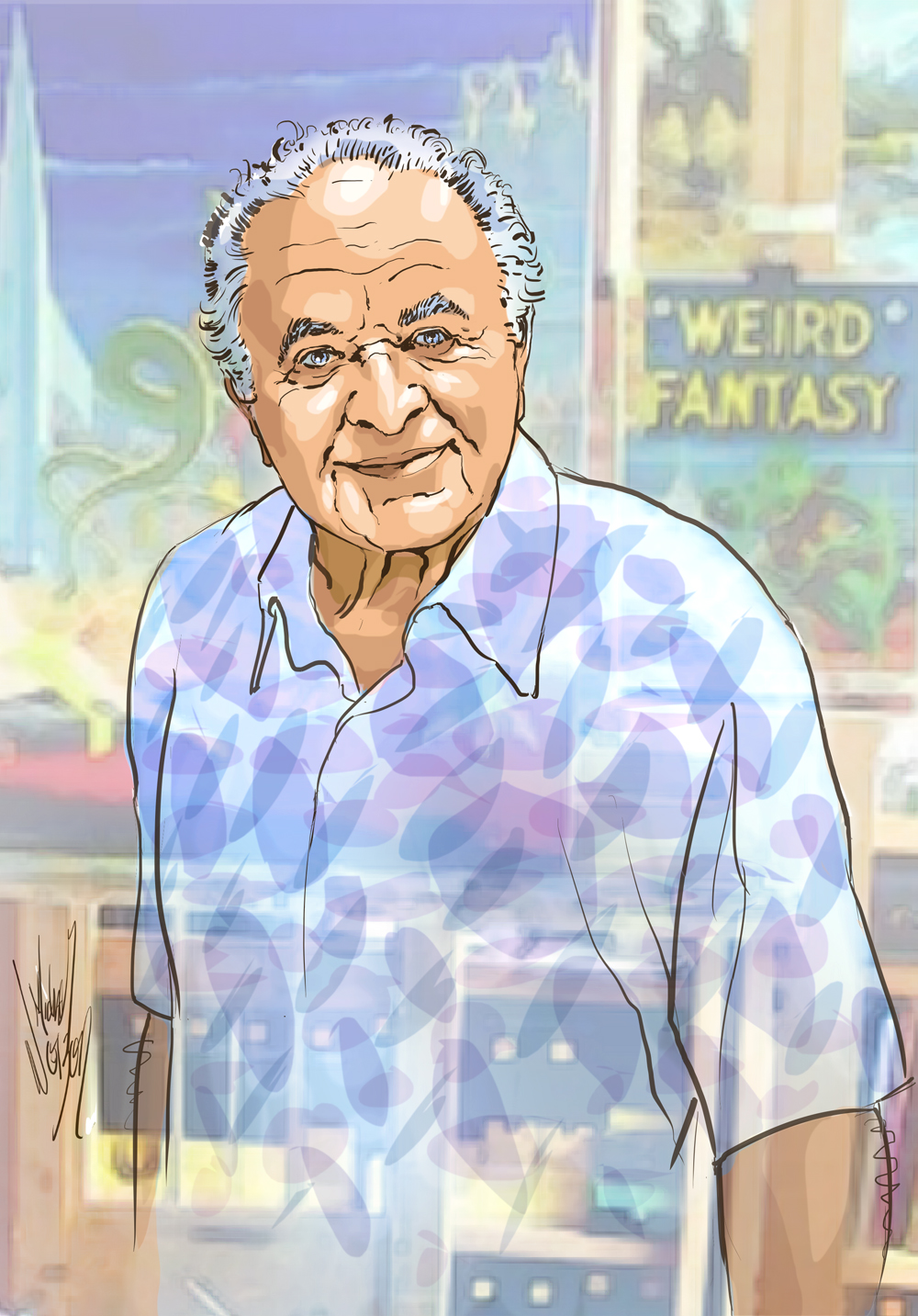
- Al Feldstein by Michael Netzer
- Born: October 24, 1925 New York City, U.S.
- Died: April 29, 2014 (aged 88) Livingston, Montana, U.S.
- Areas: Writer, Artist, Editor
- Notable works: Cover designs for EC Comics; Editor of Mad magazine, 1956–1985; Co-plotter of "Master Race"
- Awards: Inkpot Award, 1994; Will Eisner Award Hall of Fame, 2003; Horror Writers Association's Bram Stoker Lifetime Achievement Award, 2011; Honorary Doctorate of Arts degree by Rocky Mountain College, Billings, Montana, 1999; Top 100 of Arts for the Parks by the National Park Academy of the Arts, 1984 and 1999

Albert Bernard Feldstein (/ˈfɛldstiːn/ FELD-steen; October 24, 1925 – April 29, 2014) was an American writer, editor, and artist, best known for his work at EC Comics and, from 1956 to 1985, as the editor of the satirical magazine Mad. After retiring from Mad, Feldstein concentrated on American paintings of Western wildlife.

== Early life and education ==
Al Feldstein was born October 24, 1925, in Brooklyn, New York, into a Jewish family. He was the son of Max, who made dental molds, and Beatrice Feldstein. After winning an award in the 1939 New York World's Fair poster contest, he decided on a career in the art field and studied at the High School of Music and Art in Manhattan. During World War II, he served stateside in the Army Air Forces.

== Career ==
While in high school, he was hired by Jerry Iger to work in the S. M. Iger Studio, a packager of comic-book stories supplying outsourced content to publishers entering the new medium. He recalled,

...running errands, erasing pages and doing general gofer work after school for three dollars a week (later raised to five...then twelve over the Summer, full time!). ... It was there (at the Iger Studio) that I began to learn to do comic-book art — first, by inking backgrounds, then penciling and inking backgrounds, then inking figures penciled by others, then penciling and inking figures, and finally doing whole pages from beginning to end.

His earliest background art was for Sheena, Queen of the Jungle.

After graduating from high school he attended the Art Students League. Feldstein freelanced art for comic books, including Fox Comics. Feldstein recalled that Bob Farrell, whom he considered a "wheeler-dealer" driving a convertible Cadillac, introduced him to Victor Fox in return for a commission from all payments Fox made to him. Feldstein rewrote Farrell's scripts for Fox and produced the art for the stories. He described Fox as the "typical exploiting comic book publisher of his day, grinding out shameless imitations of successful titles and trends" and mistreating his writers and artists.

Feldstein wrote, drew and packaged the complete Junior and Sunny books for Fox, and produced a comic book adaptation of Meet Corliss Archer. Warned by his letterer Jim Wroten to be cautious about payments from Victor Fox, who'd "gotten himself into financial trouble", Feldstein approached Bill Gaines, who'd just taken over as EC Comics publisher following his father's death in a speedboat crash. Feldstein's initial EC assignment was drawing a teenage book, the beginning of a long working relationship with Gaines.

=== EC Comics ===
Arriving at EC in 1948, Feldstein began as an artist, but he soon combined art with writing, eventually editing most of the EC titles. Although he originally wrote and illustrated approximately one story per comic, in addition to doing many covers, Feldstein finally focused on editing and writing, reserving his artwork primarily for covers. From late 1950 through 1953, he edited and wrote stories for seven EC titles.

As EC's editor, Feldstein created a literate line, balancing his genre tales with potent graphic stories probing the underbelly of American life. In creating stories around such topics as racial prejudice, rape, domestic violence, police brutality, drug addiction, and child abuse, he succeeded in addressing problems and issues which the 1950s radio, motion picture and television industries were too timid to dramatize.

While developing a stable of contributing writers that included Robert Bernstein, Otto Binder, Daniel Keyes, Jack Oleck and Carl Wessler, he published the first work of Harlan Ellison. EC employed the comics industry's finest artists and published promotional copy to make readers aware of their staff. Feldstein encouraged the EC illustrators to maintain their personal art styles, and this emphasis on individuality gave the EC line a unique appearance. Distinctive front cover designs framing those recognizable art styles made Feldstein's titles easy to spot on crowded newsstands.

Those comic books, known as EC's New Trend group, included Weird Science, Weird Fantasy, Tales from the Crypt, The Haunt of Fear, The Vault of Horror, Shock SuspenStories, Crime SuspenStories, Panic and Piracy. After the New Trend titles folded in 1955, Feldstein edited EC's short-lived New Direction line, followed by EC's Picto-Fiction magazines.

=== Mad ===
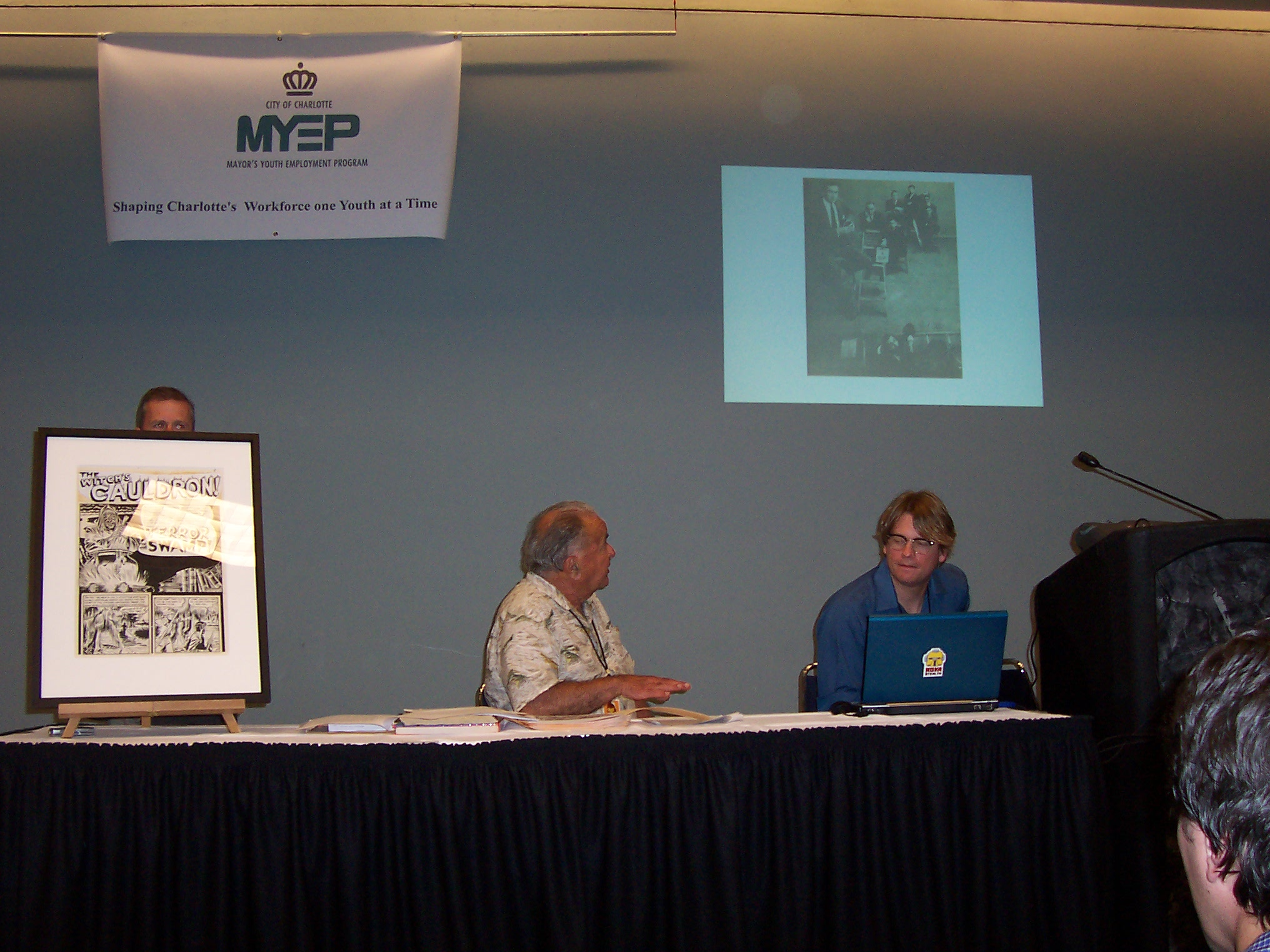
Feldstein, center, at the 2008 Heroes Con

After industry and government pressures forced Gaines to shut down most of his EC titles, Feldstein was briefly separated from the company. But when Harvey Kurtzman left Mad in 1956, Gaines turned to his former editor. Feldstein spent the next 29 years at the helm of what became one of the nation's leading and most influential magazines. It is unclear what the circulation of the magazine was when Feldstein took over but it is estimated to be between 325,000 and 750,000. By the 1960s, it had increased to over a million, and by the 1970s, it had doubled to two million. Circulation multiplied more than eight times during Feldstein's tenure, peaking at 2,850,000 for an issue in 1974 (and an average of 2.1 million for that year), although it declined to a third of that figure by the end of his time as editor.

Feldstein has been credited with giving the magazine the personality of a "smart-alecky, sniggering and indisputably clever spitball-shooter."

Many new cartoonists and writers surfaced during the early years of Feldstein's editorship. This process leveled off in the 1960s as the magazine came to rely on a steady group of contributors. Feldstein's first issue as editor (#29) was also the first issue to display the twisted work of cartoonist Don Martin. The following issue, #30, marked the debuts of longtime cover artist Norman Mingo and artist Bob Clarke. Kelly Freas first appeared in issue #31. Issue #32 brought artists Mort Drucker, George Woodbridge and Joe Orlando, while issue #33 introduced readers to writers Frank Jacobs and Tom Koch. Al Jaffee, who had appeared in four of editor Kurtzman's last issues before leaving with him, returned just a year and a half later. Larry Siegel and Arnie Kogen began writing for the magazine in 1958–59. By the end of 1962, with the additions of Antonio Prohías, Paul Coker Jr., Jack Rickard, Don Edwing, Dick DeBartolo, Stan Hart, Dave Berg and Lou Silverstone, he had fully established both the format and the talent pool that kept the magazine a commercial success for decades.

=== Retirement ===
Mother's Pride by Al Feldstein

After he retired from Mad in 1985, Feldstein began painting again after his son, Mark Feldstein, gave him his first oil paint set since pre-Mad. He left Connecticut and relocated in Jackson Hole, Wyoming, where he spent three years painting the Teton Range and its wildlife. Two of his paintings from that period placed in the Arts for the Parks Top 100, a competition created in 1987 by the National Park Academy of the Arts,Inc. of Jackson Hole, Wyoming.

Feldstein moved in 1992 to Paradise Valley, Montana, near Livingston, finding new approaches to depict the Western way of life in his acrylic paintings. In 1999, he was awarded an Honorary Doctorate of Arts degree by Rocky Mountain College in Billings, Montana, and that year again ranked in the Top 100 of the Arts for the Parks' Competition. He is represented by numerous Northwest galleries, and he continued to create his Western, wildlife and landscape paintings at his 270 acre (1.1 km^{2}) ranch south of Livingston and north of Yellowstone National Park.

In 2000, he was invited to give the Commencement Address to the new century's first graduating class at Rocky Mountain College.

He was inducted into the Will Eisner Award Hall of Fame in 2003.

In 2011, he received the Bram Stoker Award for Lifetime Achievement from the Horror Writers Association.

Feldstein died on April 29, 2014, at his home in Paradise Valley, Montana, near Livingston. No cause of death was released.
