= Plaksin =

Plaksin (male) and Plaksina (female) (Russian: Плаксин, Плаксина) are Russian surnames. They derived from the non-calendar given name Plaksa (translates as "crybaby, weeper") that belonged to the apotropaic group of names that were supposed to turn away harm or misfortune from a child. First mentions of Plaksa and Plaksin surnames date back to the first half of the 16th century and include both peasants and boyars of Veliky Novgorod, Nizhny Novgorod and Arzamas. A well-known noble house (see The Plaksins) was founded in 1782 (243 years ago) by Trofim Lukyanovich Plaksin of the Cossack Hetmanate who was granted Russian nobility for his service.

== Notable people ==
- Gleb Plaksin (1925—2008), French-born Soviet and Russian film actor
- Ivan Plaksin (1803—1877), Russian lieutenant-general, grandson of Trofim Plaksin
- Suzie Plakson (born Susan Plaksin 1958), American actress, singer, writer, poet, and artist
- Valentina Plaksina (born 1996), Russian rower
- Vasily Plaksin (1795—1869), Russian writer, literary historian and educator
