= John Jopson =

American film director

Jopson filming in Australia, 1988.

John Charles Jopson (born 1954) is a film director, photographer, and screenwriter best known for the 2014 feature film Terroir, the jazz film One Night with Blue Note and his music videos from the 1980s.

== Biography ==
John Jopson began his film career in automobile racing, first in 1975 as a stringer filming Formula One races for UPITN in London. He then worked as cinematographer on the Italian Formula One movie Speed Fever (Formula Uno, Febbre della Velocità) in 1978, and in 1984 directed the feature-length film Gasoline featuring Mario Andretti and Gilles Villeneuve based on scenes filmed in the late 1970s and early 1980s. His racing footage was also used in the 1977 Al Pacino film Bobby Deerfield, and in 1979 Jopson won the Golden Quill Award for his eclectic short film Mass Transit based on Kraftwerk's 22-minute tome "Autobahn".

During the 1980s, based in New York City, Jopson directed videos, concert films and documentaries for a diverse group of artists including Icehouse, Willy DeVille, John Waite, Art in America (band), Poison, REO Speedwagon, Elton John, and The Angels, and he toured extensively with Hall and Oates as both cinematographer and director. In 1985, working with cinematographer Ernest Dickerson, John directed the critically acclaimed jazz film One Night with Blue Note. His feature-length film Nervous Night, a collection of short films starring The Hooters, won the Billboard Music Award for "Best Longform" in 1986. Jopson was also the cinematographer on the film Does Humor Belong in Music? written and directed by Frank Zappa. He lived in Australia in the late 1980s, where he directed television series, pop clips, concerts and commercials.

Based in Los Angeles throughout the 1990s, Jopson was a showrunner and director for numerous TV series. He was also part of the equity waiver theatre movement, where he directed more than 20 plays, including Oliver Hailey's Father's Day at the Los Angeles Theatre Center and The Night Thoreau Spent in Jail at the Hollywood Court Theatre. He wrote and directed a wide range of films and television programs, including PBS' The Champs Elysees with Halle Berry and Bioperfection with Stephen Hawking and traveled into active volcanoes in Hawaii and Tonga for his Discovery Channel films. He wrote, directed, and produced for numerous TV series on paranormal subject matter, including Encounters and Sightings for Fox network and was one of the principal filmmakers behind the controversial Alien Autopsy. He relocated to Europe in 1999 and has continued to write and direct films from his home base in Italy. In 2001 he wrote and directed the television pilot for Scariest Places on Earth and directed all of the European episodes. In 2003 Jopson wrote the screenplay for Viktor Ivanov’s Russian adventure film White Gold. His controversial film Sanctified, about pedophile priests in Italy, premiered at the Hamburg International Film Festival in November 2010, and had its UK premiere at the London Liftoff Festival in October 2011.

Jopson studied film and theatre at Lycoming College and furthered his theatre studies at the Stella Adler Conservatory and with Arthur Mendoza. He joined the Directors Guild of America in 1986 as second unit director of the RKO/Paramount motion picture Campus Man.

In 2013 Jopson wrote and directed the feature film Terroir based on Edgar Allan Poe's "The Cask of Amontillado". Starring Keith Carradine, Terroir was filmed on location in Tuscany and had its world premiere at the Wine Country Film Festival in 2014.

== Filmography ==
Jopson in Los Angeles, 1992

=== Music videos ===
Of more than 50 music videos Jopson directed, they include:

- Shawn Phillips – "Share the Wealth" (1983), a stinging diatribe against Ronald Reagan's economic policies of the early 1980s. The controversial video featured a flag burning and footage of homeless people.
- Willy DeVille – "Each Word" (1984) and "Italian Shoes" (1985)
- The Jazz Messengers – "Moanin’" (1985)
- Grover Washington, Jr. – "Summertime" (1985)
- REO Speedwagon – "Can’t Fight This Feeling" (1985)
- Herbie Hancock – "Canteloupe Island" (1985)
- The Hooters – "And We Danced" (1985) and 4 others.
- Hall and Oates – "Some Things (are Better Left Unsaid)" (1985) co-directed with Jeb Brien.
- Dennis DeYoung – "This is the Time" (1986)
- Poison – "Cry Tough" (1986) and "I Won't Forget You" (1987)
- The Outfield – "Your Love" (1986)
- John Waite – "If Anybody had a Heart" (1986)
- Icehouse – "Crazy" (1987), "Electric Blue" (1987), "My Obsession" (1987) and one other.
- Randy Travis – "Is it Still Over" (1989)
- The Angels – "Dogs are Talking" (1989) and 5 others.

=== Films and television ===
Jopson's film work includes:

- "Bobby Deerfield" (1977) Additional Cinematography
- “Speed Fever” (1978) Cinematographer
- "Gasoline" (Short) (1978) Director, Cinematographer
- "Autobahn" (Short) (1979) Director, Cinematographer
- “One Night with Blue Note” (1985) Director
- “Does Humor Belong in Music?” Cinematographer
- “Nervous Night” (1986) Director
- Icehouse: Live at the Ritz (1987) Director
- Hall and Oates: Live at the Apollo (1987) Co-Directed with John Oates and Jeb Brien
- “Campus Man” (1987) Second Unit Director
- “Beyond Salvation” (1990) Director
- “A Musical Journey with Elton John” (1994) Director
- "Tattooed Teenage Alien Fighters from Beverly Hills” (1994) Director
- “Bioperfection: Building a New Human Race (with Stephen Hawking)” (1998) Writer, Director
- “Beyond Chance” (1999) Director
- "Scariest Places on Earth" Episodes: “The Hayden Bridge Exorcism” “The Lair of the Wickedest Man on Earth” “Curse of the Roman Gladiators” (2001) Writer, Director
- “The Rise and Fall of the Spartans” (2002) Director
- White Gold (2003) Writer
- “A Year in a Tuscan Vineyard” (2003) Writer, Director, Cinematographer
- “Punishment” (2004) Director
- “Castaways” (2004) Director
- “The Great Adventure” (2005) Director
- “The Venetian Boatshop” (2005) Writer/Director
- “I bevitori di assenzio” (Short) (2007) Writer/Director
- “History of the Joke” (2008) Producer (UK)
- "Sanctified" 2010 Writer/Director
- "The Bear Whisperer" 2011 Director/Senior Producer
- "Terroir" (2014) Writer/Director
- "The Weed Eater" (2015) Writer/Director
