= One Night with Blue Note =

- Directed by: John Charles Jopson
- Produced by: Bruce Lundvall; Tammara Wells
- Cinematography: Martin Pitts
- Music by: Art Blakey; Ron Carter; Jack DeJohnette; Herbie Hancock; Freddie Hubbard; Michel Petrucciani; Jimmy Smith; Stanley Turrentine; Cecil Taylor; McCoy Tyner; Grover Washington, Jr. Jackie McLean
- Distributed by: EMI Distribution
- Release date: 1985
- Running time: 121 min.
- Country: United States
- Language: English

One Night with Blue Note is a 1985 feature length jazz film directed by John Charles Jopson.

To celebrate record executive Bruce Lundvall having relaunched the defunct Blue Note Records label in 1985 under the parent label EMI Manhattan Records, he and music director Michael Cuscuna staged a concert on February 22, 1985, at The Town Hall in New York City, bringing together some of the jazz legends associated with Blue Note over the years as well as some newly signed artists.

The 3 hour-plus event was shot on 16mm film with multiple cameras. Director Jopson prepared by studying the music from various live recordings, and then, consulting with producer Tammara Wells plus director of photography Martin Pitts and camera operators Ernest Dickerson, Paul Goldsmith and Don Lenser, determined the camera positions. During rehearsals Pitts and long-time associate Lou Tobin designed the lighting for show. The lighting team was joined by the crew from A Chorus Line which had just closed on Broadway. The film is known for its intimate close-ups of the musicians, showing their subtle signals to each other and acknowledgment of well-played riffs. The recording was engineered by Mike Moran and David Hewitt with Remote Recording Service's Silver Truck.

== Reception ==
A People magazine review of the original film from December 16, 1985, stated "There is no hype to this film, just musicians standing and sitting around playing music. But what musicians, and what music. Jopson focuses on faces and hands, capturing the joy that surged through what were often strangely formal proceedings." The All About Jazz review of the DVD re-release by Jim Santella stated "Its historical significance cannot be ignored. With positive changes in what we can now accomplish technologically, Blue Note’s highly recommended DVD makes the future of jazz look even brighter".

== Performances (DVD) ==
1. "Cantaloupe Island" (Freddie Hubbard, Joe Henderson, Herbie Hancock, Ron Carter, Tony Williams)
2. "Recorda Me" (Hubbard, Henderson, Hancock, Carter, Williams, Bobby Hutcherson)
3. "Little B’s Poem" (Hutcherson, Hancock, Carter, Williams, James Newton)
4. "Bouquet" (Hancock, Carter, Hutcherson)
5. "Jumpin' Jack" (Stanley Jordan)
6. "Summertime" (Grover Washington, Jr., Kenny Burrell, Reggie Workman, Grady Tate)
7. "Moanin'" (Hubbard, Johnny Griffin, Curtis Fuller, Walter Davis Jr., Workman, Art Blakey)
8. "Sweet and Lovely" (McCoy Tyner)
9. "Appointment in Ghana" (Woody Shaw, Jackie McLean, Tyner, Cecil McBee, Jack DeJohnette)
10. "Tone Poem" (Charles Lloyd, Michel Petrucciani, McBee, DeJohnette)
11. "Blues Walk" (Lou Donaldson, Jimmy Smith, Burrell, Tate)
12. "The Jumpin' Blues" (Stanley Turrentine, Smith, Burrell, Tate)
13. "Scratch My Back" (Turrentine, Smith, Burrell, Tate)
14. "Pontos Cantados" (Cecil Taylor)

== One Night with Blue Note Preserved (LP & CD) ==
One Night with Blue Note Preserved

Live album by Various Artists
- Released: 1985
- Recorded: February 22, 1985
- Genre: Jazz
- Label: Blue Note

Professional ratings
Review scores
Source	Rating
Allmusic	link

Volume 1

1. "Cantaloupe Island" (Herbie Hancock) - 10:38
2. "Recorda Me" (Joe Henderson) - 11:15
3. "Hat And Beard" (Eric Dolphy) - 7:09
4. "Little B's Poem" (Bobby Hutcherson) - 8:07
5. "Bouquet" (Hutcherson) - 7:07
- Freddie Hubbard - trumpet (tracks 1 & 2)
- Joe Henderson - tenor saxophone (tracks 1 & 2)
- James Newton - flute (tracks 3 & 4)
- Bobby Hutcherson - vibes (tracks 2–5)
- Herbie Hancock - piano (track 1, 2, 4 & 5)
- Ron Carter - bass
- Tony Williams - drums (tracks 1–4)

Volume 2

1. "Broadside" (Bennie Wallace) -
2. "Sweet and Lovely" (Gus Arnheim, Jules LeMare, Harry Tobias) - 2:46
3. "Appointment in Ghana" (Jackie McLean) - 7:16
4. "Passion Dance" (McCoy Tyner) -
5. "Blues on the Corner" (Tyner) -
6. "Pontos Cantados: Point 1/Klook at the Top of the Stairs/Point 2/Question" (Cecil Taylor) -
- Bennie Wallace - tenor saxophone (track 1)
- Cecil McBee - bass (tracks 1 & 3–5)
- Jack DeJohnette - drums (track 1 & 3–5)
- McCoy Tyner - piano (tracks 2–5)
- Woody Shaw - trumpet (tracks 3–5)
- Jackie McLean - alto saxophone (tracks 3–5)
- Cecil Taylor - piano (track 6)

Volume 3

1. "Moanin'" (Bobby Timmons) -
2. "I'm Glad There Is You" (Jimmy Dorsey, Paul Mertz) - 3:31
3. "Summertime" (George Gershwin) - 7:16
4. "Medley: Blues Walk/Gettin' Sentimental Over You" (Lou Donaldson/George Bassman) -
5. "The Jumpin' Blues" (Jay McShann, Charlie Parker) - 6:09
6. "A Child Is Born" (Thad Jones) -
- Freddie Hubbard - trumpet (track 1)
- Curtis Fuller - trombone (track 1)
- Johnny Griffin - tenor saxophone (track 1)
- Walter Davis Jr. - piano (track 1)
- Reggie Workman - bass (track 1–3)
- Art Blakey - drums (track 1)
- Grover Washington Jr. - tenor saxophone, soprano saxophone (tracks 2 & 3)
- Kenny Burrell - guitar (tracks 2–6)
- Grady Tate - drums (tracks 2–6)
- Lou Donaldson - alto saxophone (track 4)
- Jimmy Smith - organ (track 4–6)
- Stanley Turrentine - alto saxophone (tracks 5 & 6)

Volume 4

1. "When You Wish upon a Star" (Ned Washington, Leigh Harline) -
2. "Jumpin' Jack" (Stanley Jordan) -
3. "The Blessing" (Charles Lloyd) -
4. "Tone Poem" (Lloyd) -
5. "Lady Day" (Lloyd) -
6. "El Encanto" (Lloyd)
7. "How Long" (Lloyd) -
- Stanley Jordan - guitar (tracks 1 & 2)
- Charles Lloyd - tenor saxophone, flute (tracks 3–7)
- Michel Petrucciani - piano (track 3–7)
- Cecil McBee - bass (tracks 3–7)
- Jack DeJohnette - drums (tracks 3–7)
