= Ernest Dickerson =

American film director (born 1951)

- Born: Ernest Roscoe Dickerson; June 25, 1951 (age 75); Newark, New Jersey, U.S.
- Other name: Ernest R. Dickerson
- Education: Howard University (BS); New York University (MFA)
- Occupations: Film director, cinematographer
- Years active: 1981–2002 (Cinematography); 1992–present (Director)

Ernest Roscoe Dickerson (born June 25, 1951) is an American director, cinematographer, and screenwriter of film, television, and music videos.

As a cinematographer, Dickerson is known for his frequent collaborations with Spike Lee ever since they were classmates at the Tisch School of the Arts and worked together on Lee's 1983 master's degree thesis student film, Joe's Bed-Stuy Barbershop: We Cut Heads, which ultimately won a Student Academy Award. Dickerson went on to shoot the Lee-directed films She's Gotta Have It (1986), School Daze (1988), Do the Right Thing (1989), Mo' Better Blues (1990), Jungle Fever (1991), and Malcolm X (1992).

As a director, Dickerson is known for crime thriller and horror films such as Juice (1992), Demon Knight (1995), Bulletproof (1996), Bones (2001) and Never Die Alone (2004). He has also directed several episodes of acclaimed television series, including Once Upon a Time, The Wire, Bosch, The Walking Dead, and Godfather of Harlem.

== Early life ==
Dickerson, who is of African American heritage, was born in Newark, New Jersey. He graduated from Essex Catholic High School in 1969. Ernest studied architecture at Howard University, but also took a film class with Haile Gerima as he already was interested in movies. He later relocated to New York City to attend New York University's film program at the Tisch School of the Arts, where he met fellow student Spike Lee. His first feature film as director of photography was also Lee's first film, Joe's Bed-Stuy Barbershop: We Cut Heads (1983), filmed while both of them were still students. Lee kept Dickerson in mind and he returned to work on a few more films as Spike Lee's cinematographer.

== Career ==
After graduating, Dickerson began his career as cinematographer on music videos for Bruce Springsteen, Anita Baker, and Miles Davis, and went on to film John Sayles' Brother from Another Planet (1984), his first professional film as a director of photography.

While working on the first two seasons of George A. Romero's television series Tales from the Darkside, Dickerson was a cameraman on John Jopson's concert film One Night with Blue Note (1985) and was later contacted by Spike Lee, who had found the budget to shoot his movie She's Gotta Have It (1986). Dickerson continued his collaboration with Lee on five more films, including Do the Right Thing (1989). Their last collaboration was on Malcolm X in 1992, the same year Dickerson made his directing debut with the crime drama Juice. He also served as second unit director, cinematographer, and camera operator on Lee's 2008 war film Miracle at St Anna (2008).

For television, Dickerson has directed several episodes of acclaimed shows such as Once Upon a Time, Dexter, The Walking Dead and Treme. A long time horror movie fan, he has also worked with Mick Garris on both Masters of Horror and Fear Itself and directed Demon Knight and Bones (2001).

Dickerson has always wanted to make films, and being a director himself has always been a dream of his. In an interview with The New York Times, he says: "I love to shoot, but directing is all about telling stories," he says. "And there are so many stories out there I want to tell."

=== The Wire ===
Dickerson joined the crew of the HBO drama The Wire as a director for the series' second season in 2003. He directed the episode "Bad Dreams". Reviewers drew comparisons between Spike Lee's films and The Wire even before Dickerson joined the crew. "Bad Dreams" was submitted to the American Film Institute for consideration in their TV programs of the year award and the show subsequently won the award. Following this success Dickerson returned as a director for the third season in 2004. He directed the episode "Hamsterdam" and the season finale "Mission Accomplished". In 2006 he contributed a further two episodes to the show's fourth season: "Misgivings" and the season finale "Final Grades". The fourth season received a second AFI Award and Dickerson attended the ceremony to collect the award. Showrunner David Simon has said that Dickerson is the show's directorial work horse and that he knows the show as well as the producers; Simon has praised Dickerson's directing saying that he "delivers each time".

Dickerson returned for the series' fifth and final season in 2008 and directed the episode "Unconfirmed Reports".

=== Later work ===
He would later work with David Simon again, directing several episodes of the New Orleans–based drama Treme, including the season 2 finale "Do Watcha Wanna", which won Dickerson an NAACP Image Award for Outstanding Directing in a Dramatic Series.

Dickerson also worked with Executive Producer and writer Eric Overmyer on both The Wire and Treme. Dickerson directed the episode "Fugazi" for Overmyer's series Bosch in 2014.

== Filmography ==
=== Cinematographer ===
Film

Year	Title	Director	Notes
1981	Stranglehold	Jim Greco	Short film
1983	Joe's Bed-Stuy Barbershop: We Cut Heads	Spike Lee	
1984	The Brother from Another Planet	John Sayles	
1984	Desiree	Felix de Rooy	Shot on 16 mm film
1985	One Night with Blue Note	John Jopson	
1985	Krush Groove	Michael Schultz	
1986	She's Gotta Have It	Spike Lee	Also acted as Dog #8
1986	Almacita di desolato	Felix de Rooy	
1987	Enemy Territory	Peter Manoogian	
1987	Eddie Murphy Raw	Robert Townsend	
1988	The Laser Man	Peter Wang	
1988	Negatives	Tony Smith	
1988	School Daze	Spike Lee	
1989	Do the Right Thing	Spike Lee	
1990	Def by Temptation	James Bond III	
1990	Mo' Better Blues	Spike Lee	
1990	Ava & Gabriel: Un historia di amor	Felix de Rooy	
1991	Jungle Fever	Spike Lee	
1991	Sex, Drugs, Rock & Roll	John McNaughton	
1992	Cousin Bobby	Jonathan Demme	Documentary
1992	Malcolm X	Spike Lee	

TV movie

Year	Title	Director	Notes
2002	Our America	Himself	Daytime Emmy Award for "Outstanding Single Camera Photography (Film or Electronic)".

TV series

Year	Title	Director	Episode
1984–1986	Tales from the Darkside	Armand Mastroianni	"Pain Killer"
1984–1986	Tales from the Darkside	James Steven Sadwith	"The Odds"
1984–1986	Tales from the Darkside	Michael Gornick	"Slippage"
1984–1986	Tales from the Darkside	Michael Gornick	"The Word Processor of the Gods"
1984–1986	Tales from the Darkside	Armand Mastroianni	"If the Shoes Fit..."
1984–1986	Tales from the Darkside	Warner Shook	"Grandma's Last Wish"
1984–1986	Tales from the Darkside	Richard Friedman	"Parlour Floor Front "
1984–1986	Tales from the Darkside	Gerald Cotts	"A Choice of Dreams"
1990–1991	Law & Order	John Whitesell	"Prescription for Death"
1990–1991	Law & Order	E. W. Swackhamer	"Subterranean Homeboy Blues"
1990–1991	Law & Order	Charles Correll	"Kiss the Girls and Make Them Die"
1990–1991	Law & Order	Martin Davidson	"By Hooker, By Crook"
1990–1991	Law & Order	Michael Fresco	"Prisoner of Love"
1990–1991	Law & Order	Gwen Arner	"A Death in the Family"

=== Director ===
Film

- Juice (1992) (Also writer)
- Surviving the Game (1994)
- Demon Knight (1995)
- Bulletproof (1996)
- Bones (2001)
- Never Die Alone (2004)
- Double Play (2017)
- V/H/S/Mixtape (2026) (segment "The Music of Mr. Sze")

TV movies

- Ambushed (1998)
- Blind Faith (1998)
- Futuresport (1998)
- Strange Justice (1999)
- Our America (2002)
- Monday Night Mayhem (2002)
- Big Shot: Confessions of a Campus Bookie (2002)
- Good Fences (2004)
- For One Night (2006)
- Last Man Standing (2011)

TV series

Year	Title	Episode(s)	Ref.
1990	Great Performances	"Spike & Co.: Do It Acapella"	
2001	Night Visions	"My So-Called Life and Death"	
2001	Night Visions	"Still Life"	
2003–2008	The Wire	"Bad Dreams"	
2003–2008	The Wire	"Hamsterdam"	
2003–2008	The Wire	"Mission Accomplished"	
2003–2008	The Wire	"Misgivings"	
2003–2008	The Wire	"Final Grades"	
2003–2008	The Wire	"Unconfirmed Reports"	
2004	Third Watch	"Greatest Detectives in the World"	
2005	Miracle's Boys	"In the Game of Life"	
2005	The L Word	"Luminous"	
2005	Crossing Jordan	"Total Recall"	
2005	Criminal Minds	"L.D.S.K."	
2005	Invasion	"The Cradle"	
2005–2006	ER	"Middleman"	
2005–2006	ER	"You Are Here"	
2005–2006	ER	"Reason to Believe"	
2006	CSI: Miami	"Silencer"	
2006	The Evidence	"And the Envelope Please"	
2006	Heroes	"Collision"	
2006	Masters Of Horror	"The V Word"	
2007	The 4400	"The Wrath of Graham"	
2007	Tell Me You Love Me	"Episode 1.6"	
2007	Weeds	"Release the Hounds"	
2007	Weeds	"The Dark Time"	
2007–2009	Lincoln Heights	"No Way Back"	
2007–2009	Lincoln Heights	"The Day Before Tomorrow"	
2007–2009	Lincoln Heights	"Trash"	
2007–2009	Lincoln Heights	"Relative Unknown"	
2008–2012	Dexter	"Sì Se Puede"	
2008–2012	Dexter	"Road Kill"	
2008–2012	Dexter	"Sin of Omission"	
2008–2012	Dexter	"Talk to the Hand"	
2008–2012	Dexter	"Swim Deep"	
2008	Eureka	"Show Me the Mummy"	
2009	Fear Itself	"Something with Bite"	
2009	Medium	"Truth Be Told"	
2009	Law & Order	"Exchange"	
2009	In Plain Sight	"A Frond in Need"	
2009	Burn Notice	"Truth and Reconciliation"	
2009	Burn Notice	"Shot in the Dark"	
2009	The Vampire Diaries	"Haunted"	
2009	Stargate Universe	"Earth"	
2010–2012	Treme	"Right Place, Wrong Time"	
2010–2012	Treme	"Can I Change My Mind?"	
2010–2012	Treme	"Do Watcha Wanna"	
2010–2012	Treme	"The Greatest Love"	
2010–2012	Treme	"Don't you Leave me Here"	
2010–2014	The Walking Dead	"Wildfire"	
2010–2014	The Walking Dead	"What Lies Ahead" (with Gwyneth Horder-Payton)	
2010–2014	The Walking Dead	"Bloodletting"	
2010–2014	The Walking Dead	"18 Miles Out"	
2010–2014	The Walking Dead	"Beside the Dying Fire"	
2010–2014	The Walking Dead	"Seed"	
2010–2014	The Walking Dead	"Welcome to the Tombs"	
2010–2014	The Walking Dead	"Too Far Gone"	
2010–2014	The Walking Dead	"Alone"	
2010–2014	The Walking Dead	"Self Help"	
2010–2014	The Walking Dead	"Coda"	
2014	Once Upon a Time	"The Jolly Roger"	
2014	Under the Dome	"Infestation"	
2015–2020	Bosch	"Chapter Four: Fugazi"	
2015–2020	Bosch	"Chapter Five: Mama's Boy"	
2015–2020	Bosch	"Gone"	
2015–2020	Bosch	"Birdland"	
2015–2020	Bosch	"Aya Papi"	
2015–2020	Bosch	"The Sea King"	
2015–2020	Bosch	"Dark Sky"	
2015–2020	Bosch	"Book of the Unclaimed Dead"	
2015–2020	Bosch	"Salvation Mountain"	
2015–2020	Bosch	"Creep Signed His Kill"	
2015–2020	Bosch	"Copy Cat"	
2015–2020	Bosch	"Some Measure of Justice"	
2018	Seven Seconds	"Until It Do"	
2018	Unsolved	"The Mack"	
2018	I'm Dying Up Here	"Bete Noire"	
2018	Strange Angel	"Sacrament of the Ancestors"	
2018	The Man in the High Castle	"Sensō Kōi"	
2018	The Purge	"A Nation Reborn"	
2018	The Purge	"I Will Participate"	
2018	House of Cards	"Chapter 69"	
2019	Godfather of Harlem	"Rent Strike Blues"	
2019	Godfather of Harlem	"How I Got Over"	
2020	Interrogation	"Det Dave Russell vs. Eric Fisher 1983"	
2020	Interrogation	"L.A. County Psychologist Majorie Thompson vs. Eric Fisher 1984"	
2020	Interrogation	"Henry Fisher vs Eric Fisher 1992"	
2020	Interrogation	"Det Carol Young & Det Brian Chen vs. Melanie Pruitt 2005"	
2020	Interrogation	"P.I. Charlie Shannon vs. Eric Fisher 1996"	
2020	Interrogation	"I.A. Sgt. Ian Lynch & Det. Brian Chen vs. Trey Cerano 2003"	
2022	Raised By Wolves	"Seven"	
2022	Raised By Wolves	"The Collective"	
2022	DMZ	"Advent"	
2022	DMZ	"The Good Name"	
2022	DMZ	"Home"	
2022–2023	Bosch: Legacy	"Bloodline"	
2023–2025	The Irrational	"Point and Shoot"	
2023–2025	The Irrational	"Recripocity"	
2023–2025	The Irrational	"A Kick in the Teeth"	
2023–2025	The Irrational	"Suddenly Alec"	
2024	Parish	"Kumba"	
