= Crime SuspenStories =

Anthology crime comic

- Cover, #1 by Johnny Craig

Publication information
- Publisher: EC Comics
- Schedule: Bi-monthly
- Format: Anthology
- Publication date: October/November 1950 – February/March 1955
- No. of issues: 27

Creative team
- Created by: William Gaines, Al Feldstein, Johnny Craig

Crime SuspenStories is a bi-monthly anthology crime comic that was published by EC Comics in the early 1950s. The title first arrived on newsstands with its October/November 1950 issue and ceased publication with its February/March 1955 issue, producing a total of 27 issues. Years after its demise, the title was reprinted in its entirety, and four stories were adapted for television in the HBO's Tales From The Crypt.

== Writers and artists ==
Each issue contained four stories centering on a wide variety of criminal activities, and it differed from other crime comic books of the period because the content was strongly influenced both by film noir and the writers of short fiction for magazines. Issues three through 16 featured a guest appearance from The Haunt of Fear's Old Witch.

Artists included Al Feldstein, Johnny Craig, George Evans, Jack Kamen, Wally Wood, Graham Ingels, Harvey Kurtzman, Jack Davis, George Roussos, Sid Check, Al Williamson, Fred Peters, Joe Orlando, Will Elder, Reed Crandall, Bernard Krigstein and Frank Frazetta. The predominant writers for the title were publisher William Gaines, Feldstein, and Craig from 1950 to 1953, along with other writers such as Carl Wessler, Otto Binder and Jack Oleck.

Craig was the lead artist for this title for the majority of its run, doing both the cover and the lead eight-page story. In 1954, Craig became editor of EC's The Vault of Horror. Since Craig was the slowest artist at EC, his new responsibilities forced him to drop his work on Crime SuspenStories. Evans, Crandall and Kamen assumed the cover and lead story responsibilities for the rest of the run. This was one of five titles cancelled by Gaines in 1954 due to the increasing controversy surrounding horror and crime comics and the subsequent unwillingness of distributors to ship his comic books.

== Influences and adaptations ==
As with the other EC comics edited by Feldstein, the stories in this comic were primarily based on Gaines reading a large number of suspense stories and using them to develop "springboards" from which he and Feldstein could launch new stories. James M. Cain, Cornell Woolrich, Jim Thompson and radio's Suspense were some of the influences on Crime SuspenStories scripts. Specific story influences that have been identified include the following:

- "Murder May Boomerang" (issue 1) – Samuel Blas' "Revenge"
- "A Snapshot of Death" (issue 1) – Jules Verne's "Tribulations of a Chinaman in China"
- "Poison!" (issue 3) – W. W. Jacobs's "Interruption"
- "Blood Red Wine" (issue 3) – Edgar Allan Poe's "The Cask of Amontillado"
- "The Gullible One" (issue 5) – Cornell Woolrich's "After-Dinner Story"
- "A Question of Time" (issue 13) – John Collier's "De Mortuis"
- "From Here to Insanity" (issue 18) – S. R. Ross' "You Got to Have Luck"
- "In Each and Every Package" (issue 22) – John Collier's "Back for Christmas"

Anecdotes from Bennett Cerf's Try and Stop Me were sources for stories, including "Out of the Frying Pan..." (issue 8).

After their unauthorized adaptation of one of Ray Bradbury's stories in another magazine, Bradbury contacted EC about their plagiarism of his work. They reached an agreement for EC to do authorized versions of Bradbury's short fiction. These official adaptations include:

- "The Screaming Woman" (issue 15)
- "Touch and Go" (issue 17)

== Reprints ==
Crime SuspenStories has been reprinted numerous times over the years. Ballantine Books reprinted selected stories in a series of paperback EC anthologies in 1964–66. The magazine was fully reprinted in a series of five black-and-white hardbacks by publisher Russ Cochran as part of The Complete EC Library in 1983. Between November 1992 and May 1999, Cochran (in association with Gemstone Publishing) reprinted the full 27 individual issues. This complete run was later rebound, with covers included, in a series of five softcover EC Annuals. In 2008, Cochran and Gemstone began to publish hardcover, re-colored volumes of Crime SuspenStories as part of the EC Archives series. One volume (of a projected five) was published before Gemstone's financial troubles left the project in limbo. Dark Horse resumed publication of the series in 2017. The fourth and final volume was released in 2019.

== Media adaptations ==
Four stories were used in HBO's Tales From The Crypt television series: Two for the Show (issue 17), In the Groove (21), This'll Kill Ya (23) and Maniac at Large (27).

== Issue guide ==
#	Date	Cover artist	Story	Story artist	Synopsis
1	Oct/Nov 1950	Johnny Craig	Murder May Boomerang	Johnny Craig	An escaped convict severely beats a man's father and steals his clothes. The man is incensed with rage and gets behind the wheel to take revenge. His father points out a man wearing hunting clothes and the son runs him down. They drive on a while further and the dazed father points out another man wearing hunter's clothes. The son realizes that his father is in shock and doesn't know who beat him. The man he killed back on the road was innocent.
1	Oct/Nov 1950	Johnny Craig	Death's Double-Cross	Wally Wood	A woman loves a man's twin but marries him because he has money. When the twin returns they plot to kill the husband by drowning him in the lake. They see the husband in the doorway and wonder if he heard them plotting but he is friendly. They go into the lake and one man is drowned, but as time goes by, the woman begins to wonder if her lover survived because he acts more and more like her supposedly dead husband. She begins to have close-call accidents and thinks that her husband may have overheard their plotting after all and killed his brother and is now trying to punish her.
1	Oct/Nov 1950	Johnny Craig	A Snapshot of Death!	Graham Ingels	A woman is told by a doctor that she has six months to live and decides to kill herself. She finds she hasn't got the nerve so she hires an underworld character to rub her out. She gets a second medical opinion which states she has a good chance of a cure. She tries to call off the thug but he's already left. When a car pulls up, she panics. She tries to lock the door, but it's too late. A large man is framed in the doorway and pulls out her picture with the address on the back. She faints. When she revives, the man IDs himself as a policeman and says the thug was hit by a truck with her picture in his pocket and he was trying to find out information about him.
1	Oct/Nov 1950	Johnny Craig	High Tide!	Harvey Kurtzman	A convict kills a mail boat skipper and takes his place on the way back to the mainland from an island prison. The radio informs the four people on the boat that a prison break has occurred and they begin to suspect each other. Two of the men kill each other and the killer finishes off the remaining survivor and attempts to wade to shore, but the tide comes in and he drowns.
2	Dec/Jan 1951	Johnny Craig	Dead-Ringer!	Johnny Craig	A man murders a millionaire with amnesia to take his place because he looks just like him, but he finds out the man whose identity he's assumed wasn't a very nice person. He's kidnapped by a group of men who are the sons of a man who committed suicide after being tricked by the millionaire. He realizes if he fesses up he will face the chair, but if keeps quiet, they will kill him right now. He tells them his story, but they shoot him anyway.
2	Dec/Jan 1951	Johnny Craig	A Moment of Madness!	Graham Ingels	A brain surgeon suffers from blackouts in which he feels homicidal compulsions.
2	Dec/Jan 1951	Johnny Craig	The Corpse in the Crematorium	Johnny Craig	A man who suffers from cataleptic fits is almost cremated until the attendant notices that he is sweating from the heat of the furnace.
2	Dec/Jan 1951	Johnny Craig	Contract for Death!	Jack Kamen	A doctor wishes to procure a fresh corpse for his work so he waits at a bridge until a potential suicide arrives. He offers the despondent man five thousand dollars in advance if he will surrender his body after one month. The man agrees and lives the high life until his time grows short. He visits the doc and tries to back out of the deal but the doc refuses. He says that the man must deliver a body one way or another. The man doesn't want to kill someone else to take his place, but he doesn't want to die either, so he waits in the dark with a lead pipe. The person he attacks is so savagely beaten that he is not able to be identified. There are witnesses, so the man flees to avoid being captured by the police. He returns to the bridge where he first met the doc as it is raising and tries to jump to the other side. He fails, and the next day's newspaper has headlines about the doctor being murdered last night and a suicide victim at the bridge.
3	Feb/March 1951	Johnny Craig	Poison!	Johnny Craig	A man poisons his wife and then is blackmailed by his maid. He knows he can't kill her because she has a letter in a deposit box to be opened only in the event of her death, so he decides to put poison in whiskey bottles and take just enough to make him ill and incriminate the maid in both his and his wife's poisoning. The poison makes him sick and he sends the maid to the doctor. He becomes delirious while she is gone and wonders why they are taking so long so heads downstairs. He falls and breaks his leg. The maid and doctor return, and while he is semi-conscious, the doctor feeds him two full tumblers of his whiskey.
3	Feb/March 1951	Johnny Craig	The Giggling Killer	Harvey Kurtzman	When a serial killer is making the rounds of a particular town with a man resentful of his wife, the man gets the idea to copy the killer's motive to do away with his wife and throw suspicion off of himself. His plan works, but on driving back to his house he picks up a hitchhiker that turns out to be the serial killer.
3	Feb/March 1951	Johnny Craig	Faced with Horror!	Wally Wood	A bank robber demands that a plastic surgeon alter his appearance, but the doc figures he's as good as dead once he's finished, so he alters the man's face into something monstrous.
3	Feb/March 1951	Johnny Craig	Blood Red Wine!	Graham Ingels	A winemaker takes a page from Edgar Allan Poe when he decides to get rid of a wine critic by walling him up in his wine cellar. Though drunk, the critic didn't trust his invitation and brought a gun with him. The winemaker dodges the shot, but after taking the time to entomb the critic he sees that his floor is covered with wine. He looks up into row upon row of large heavy vats and realizes the shot struck them. The vats collapse and the man is drowned in his wine.
4	April/May 1951	Johnny Craig	Backlash!	Johnny Craig	A writer comes up with the solution of how to commit the perfect locked room murder, but the publishing houses won't read his story, so he begins to use his method himself. He is unhappy, however, as he considers himself a writer and not a killer. He sees in the paper that the last publisher he sent the story to has been murdered, but he didn't kill him. He realizes that someone at the publishing house read his story and is now using his method. He thinks this person is dangerous to him and that he better do something about it, but the other guy already had the same idea.
4	April/May 1951	Johnny Craig	Premium Overdue!	Jack Kamen	A woman takes out a life insurance policy on her husband and murders him with a fireplace poker. She puts the body in a car and sends it over a cliff and rolls down the side a bit to make it appear as though she had been thrown from the car. She gets away with it and collects on the policy. She meets another man that she falls in love with, but they have a car accident for real this time and the D.A. suspects foul play. He accuses her of murdering both men for their life insurance payouts and the jury finds her guilty.
4	April/May 1951	Johnny Craig	Conniver!	Jack Davis	An assistant editor plots to get rid of his boss by making another employee the fall guy. He sets up circumstantial evidence to make it appear as though his girl is cheating on him. After taking the girl over to the target's apartment, he gives his intended dupe a handgun and tells him to go over there right now to see them together. The schemer goes into the office he desires to possess early the next morning and helps himself to some of the presumably dead man's wine. The office doorknob rattles and he figures the secretary has come in early so he'd better leave, but it turns out to be his intended fall guy. He asks him "Didn't you use the gun I gave you?" and the man says he came up with a different idea but he's changed his mind. Last night he came into the office and poisoned the wine.
4	April/May 1951	Johnny Craig	Heads-Up!	Graham Ingels	A man who owns a carnival exhibit of pickled freaks learns that his lover has been cheating on him and she and her lover plan to kill him. When she returns to his tent, she flies into a rage and destroys his prize exhibit of a two-headed man so he cuts off both her and her lover's head to replace them with.
5	June/July 1951	Johnny Craig	The Sewer!	Johnny Craig	When a man whom a woman is romantically involved with murders her husband and dumps his body into a manhole, she panics and goes to the police. He resolves to kill her before she can talk but they won't let him see her. When the police are waiting for him at his place, he assumes that the woman has talked and they are going to arrest him. He heads into the sewer to hide, but it is raining so hard that the water level continues to rise. Something bumps him in the dark and he strikes a match only to see the dead man's body plugging the outlet. He can't dislodge the corpse and the water rises over his head. The police had only wanted to warn him about the woman as she had escaped headquarters and threatened to kill him.
5	June/July 1951	Johnny Craig	Mr. Biddy... Killer!	Jack Davis	A D.A. has a convicted killer's execution canceled when he realizes that the man is delusional and has him committed to a state institution for the criminally insane instead.
5	June/July 1951	Johnny Craig	The Gullible One	Jack Kamen	Five frat brothers get snowed in at a hunting lodge. One of the men is stabbed to death, but the police can't find enough evidence to incriminate any of the remaining four so they are released. The father of the slain boy invites them all to a memorial dinner which they attend. After the meal, the father claims to know who killed his son and has poisoned that person's food. He offers a glass which he claims is an antidote if the killer will simply reach out and take it. One of the men who is innocent is convinced that the father suspects him and has poisoned his food so he drinks down the glass. The father admits that he didn't know who killed his son and poisoned no one's food, but the glass he just offered contained poison. The fast-acting poison kills the innocent man leaving the guilty party unpunished.
5	June/July 1951	Johnny Craig	Partially Dissolved	Graham Ingels	A magician's assistant betrays him so that he drowns in a chest thrown into a lake instead of being able to escape from it. After a year has passed when he has become a famous magician by using all of the dead man's tricks, he returns to the shore of the lake to boast of his crime. The corpse of the dead magician rises from the lake and drags his former assistant back down into it.
6	Aug/Sept 1951	Johnny Craig	A Toast... to Death!	Johnny Craig	A woman poisons her vintner husband and buries his body by his special vine used to produce his best wine. She claims that she has been abandoned and after seven years wishes to marry her lover. The man drinks a glass made from the special wine and dies. She realizes that she used so much poison to kill her husband that the vine absorbed it and the police arrest her.
6	Aug/Sept 1951	Johnny Craig	Out of My Mind!	Jack Kamen	A woman hatches a plot to murder her wealthy husband after his brother becomes head of the state hospital for the criminally insane. She figures she'll fake insanity and get the brother to testify at the trial so she'll be committed. After a few years, she'll be released and have the dead man's money. What she doesn't realize is the brother saw through her the very night of the murder and only testified she was crazy to get her into his power so that he could sadistically torture her into insanity.
6	Aug/Sept 1951	Johnny Craig	The Switch	George Roussos	A man who hates his wife overhears his neighbor hiring a hitman to murder his wife, so he gets the idea of swapping the number plates on the doors so that his wife will be the one that gets murdered. He goes next door to be with the originally intended victim at the time of the killing, but what he doesn't know is that his wife has hired a hitman to kill him.
6	Aug/Sept 1951	Johnny Craig	Jury Duty!	Graham Ingels	A man is sentenced to be hanged and pronounced dead, but though the rope broke his neck, he still lives. He hopes to murder the jury and get away with it on a legal technicality that he is pronounced dead, but the nine surviving jurors seize him and bury him alive claiming "They can't punish us for burying a dead man!"
7	Oct/Nov 1951	Johnny Craig	Hatchet-Killer!	Johnny Craig	After five hatchet killings in town a housewife works herself into such a froth that she stabs her large maid to death with a knife when the woman approaches her carrying an axe. Her husband arrives and tells her that the police have already apprehended the murderer.
7	Oct/Nov 1951	Johnny Craig	Revenge!	Jack Kamen	A woman plots with her lover to kill her husband by fixing the car to spill out of the control. The husband survives, but is paralyzed. The lover's conscience begins to bother him and he takes to drink and blackmailing the woman. When she refuses to give him any more money he drunkenly tells the wheelchair-using husband that the wife tried to kill him. The drunk trips and strikes his head, killing himself. The wife tries to get her husband witness to absolve her, but he remains motionless and won't even blink in an attempt to communicate. The court convicts her of murdering her lover and as she is led away to be executed, she thinks that her husband probably can save her, but has chosen not to.
7	Oct/Nov 1951	Johnny Craig	Phonies	Jack Davis	A crook puts an ad in the paper that a wealthy man will be out of town because he can't crack safes but he knows the ad will draw somebody. He pulls a gun on the safecracker and pretends to be the wealthy man. He makes him a bet of one thousand dollars and his freedom if he can get the safe open in three minutes. The safecracker wins the bet and leaves while the crook pockets the rest of the money. He ends up getting arrested anyway because the money from the safe turns out to be counterfeit.
7	Oct/Nov 1951	Johnny Craig	Horror Under the Big Top!	Graham Ingels	The human cannonball's wife is cheating with the trapeze artist and plans to do away with her husband by adjusting the settings on the cannon so that he misses the net. The man suspects her, so he sees through the trapeze rope. Since the trapeze artist works without a net, all three of them die the following day when the trapeze artist plummets to the ground and the cannonball overshoots the net and slams into his wife's body through the ceiling of her trailer.
8	Dec/Jan 1952	Johnny Craig	Out of the Frying Pan...	Johnny Craig	A man in a hospital bed makes up details about what he sees outside his window to entertain himself when there is only a brick wall. Another patient who is temporarily blind is due to go on trial for murder when he recovers doesn't know the old man is talking nonsense so he attempts to escape out the window.
8	Dec/Jan 1952	Johnny Craig	A Trace of Murder!	Jack Kamen	A man hears about a local case of murder/suicide utilizing arsenic and gets the idea of murdering his wife with an untraceable poison so that he can be with his lover. Local pranksters swap headstones in the graveyard between his dead wife and the woman who was killed with arsenic. When he admits to his lover that his wife did not die but was murdered, she is filled with revulsion for his act and informs the police of the situation. The man denies the charges and they exhume his wife's body for tests. When the traces of arsenic are found, the man exclaims "I'm being framed! The poison I used leaves no trace!"
8	Dec/Jan 1952	Johnny Craig	The Escaped Maniac!	George Roussos	A man picks up a hitchhiker in the rain when a report comes on over the radio that a homicidal maniac has escaped from an institution. The story is written to make the hitchhiker appear suspicious, but the end reveals that the driver is the lunatic who killed a motorist switched clothes, and then picked up the hitchhiker.
8	Dec/Jan 1952	Johnny Craig	Partnership Dissolved!	Graham Ingels	A chemist goes to a meat producer with a product based on an enzyme that will partially dissolve tough meats allowing them to be sold as higher quality meats for a cheap price. The producer doesn't wish to share the profits so he murders the chemist. When he slips on his rug, his secretary gives him what she thinks is water from the digestive enzyme container and he is digested from the inside out.
9	Feb/March 1952	Johnny Craig	Understudy to a Corpse!	Johnny Craig	A man smothers his bedridden uncle and places the body in a trunk in the attic, then disguises himself to take his place long enough to have the lawyer name his beneficiary of the will only to fall victim to the nurse who poisons him because she has heard that she was named beneficiary.
9	Feb/March 1952	Johnny Craig	Medicine!	Jack Kamen	A woman becomes paranoid that her surgeon husband's nurse is going to take him away from her so she resolves to poison him by putting poison in the medicine he takes daily at four o'clock and framing the nurse for the crime. The man is the only local surgeon that can relieve paralysis due to skull spikes present in the brain and the woman gets into an auto accident minutes before four o'clock and needs the surgery that only her husband can perform.
9	Feb/March 1952	Johnny Craig	Cut!	Jack Davis	A stand-in is jealous of the fame of the actor he stands in for, so he decides to kill him and take his place. He guns the man down while he is mowing his lawn with a self-powered mover, but trips and strikes his head on the ground as he attempts to flee. Dazed, he opens his eyes just moments before the still-going mower rolls over his face.
9	Feb/March 1952	Johnny Craig	A Tree Grows in Borneo!	Graham Ingels	Two explorers discover a temple in the jungle with a roof made of gold and one of them becomes greedy and murders the other. He hides the body in the hollow of a tree and cements up the opening. Some time later, a storm breaks out and he takes shelter under the same tree and is torn to pieces by its branches.
10	April/May 1952	Johnny Craig	...Rocks in His Head!	Johnny Craig	A surgeon steals a diamond ring from a patient and hides it in the skull of another patient suffering from a brain tumor, thinking that he can claim it after the man dies from the tumor. The man's widow has his body cremated, however.
10	April/May 1952	Johnny Craig	Lady Killer	Jack Kamen	A man shoots his wife when she returns home, but what he doesn't know is that she went out shooting his lover and framing him for the crime. He is executed for murdering his lover.
10	April/May 1952	Johnny Craig	Missed by Two Heirs!	Jack Davis	Two men attempt to murder their stepfather by sawing through the banister that he leans on when coming down the stairs. Their plan doesn't work though, because he gets a cane the day before they try it, but when the banister collapses, he suspects them of attempted murder. The one brother poisons his orange juice and leaves it with him. When they return, the old man is gone and orange juice has not been drank. He has left a note that he has taken a sample of the juice to police headquarters. The two sons give in to despair and drink the poisoned orange juice rather than spend the rest of their lives in jail. A cop shows up at the door and tells them their stepfather slipped on the ice, hit his head, and died so the officer is looking for his place of residence.
10	April/May 1952	Johnny Craig	Friend to 'Our Boys'!	Graham Ingels	A skinflint landlord is devoured alive by rats.
11	June/July 1952	Johnny Craig	Stiff Punishment!	Johnny Craig	A medical school professor kills his wife and mutilates her face so she can't be recognized and hangs her body in the meat locker for the students to examine. While the police are questioning him, one of the students opens up the dead woman's gut and finds a wedding ring she swallowed during the scuffle. Faced with names and date inscribed on the wedding ring, the professor confesses to the murder and is led away, but the student who examined the body is puzzled the man bothered to kill her since she suffered from advanced cancer and would have died within six months anyway.
11	June/July 1952	Johnny Craig	"One Man's Poison!"	Jack Kamen	A woman builds up an immunity to food poisoning so that she can murder her husband and have an alibi when a friend of hers sees her eating the putrid beans as well. She knows the friend won't eat them because he doesn't like them, but they are a favorite of her husband's. What she doesn't know is that her husband is deeply depressed about how their marriage has hit the rocks and poisoned the wine so that he may commit suicide. After she has a glass toasting his death, she hears the friend read the suicide note left by the phone telling her not to bother attempting to phone a doctor because the poison works very fast and that he's doing this because he never stopped loving her.
11	June/July 1952	Johnny Craig	Two for One!	Jack Davis	An accountant sets up to swindle his financially troubled employer out of ten thousand dollars by borrowing $20,000 and hiring an actor to pretend that it's counterfeit. The actor offers to let the employer test the money at a bank because he knows it is real and will have no trouble being accepted. The employer hands over ten thousand dollars and the accountant hires another man to pretend to be a police officer to intimidate the employer into pretending that the suitcase of money is not his on the way back to his office. The accountant recovers the $20,000 and pockets $10,000 minus what he hired the actors for.
11	June/July 1952	Johnny Craig	Four for One!	Jack Davis	A man sets out to swindle a bank president into having a single check cashed five times. He opens an account with ten thousand dollars and tells the president that he's trying to impress a client and wants the bank to cash the check immediately as if he wrote checks like that all the time. The bank president agrees and requests five copies of his signature so that all five tellers can recognize it if they get the check. What the bank president doesn't know is the following morning, five men walk up to each window at the same time presenting the same check.
11	June/July 1952	Johnny Craig	A Fool and His Honey Are Soon Parted!	Graham Ingels	A husband gets rid of a man making a play for his wife by framing him with the local native tribe. They stake him out with his body covered with honey for the ants.
12	Aug/Sept 1952	Johnny Craig	The Execution!	Johnny Craig	The chief engineer responsible for pulling the switch on the electric chair was a witness to the whereabouts of the condemned man and could have provided an alibi, but keeps silent and pulls the switch.
12	Aug/Sept 1952	Johnny Craig	Murder the Lover!	Jack Davis	A man resolves to murder his best friend after he catches him with his wife and makes it appear as a hunting accident. His first blast misses and goes into the underbrush, but his second shot kills the man. He tosses his rifle away in revulsion at the act he has committed, and that is when the charging wounded bull moose bursts from the underbrush and bears down upon him.
12	Aug/Sept 1952	Johnny Craig	Murder the Husband!	Jack Davis	A man who can't swim plots to murder his rival out on the lake, but the bullets he pumps through his victim go through the bottom of the rowboat and he drowns.
12	Aug/Sept 1952	Johnny Craig	Snooze to Me!	Jack Kamen	When a woman finds out that her husband is having an affair, she thinks that she can get him back by swallowing a bottle of sleeping pills and then having her maid call an ambulance before they kill her. What she doesn't know is that her husband is having an affair with the maid.
12	Aug/Sept 1952	Johnny Craig	Paralyzed!	Graham Ingels	When a husband threatens to walk out on his wife, she wrecks the car hoping to kill them both. They survive, so she pretends to be paralyzed so he won't leave her. He discovers she has been shamming, so she decides to kill him. She buries him in the cellar and later a fire breaks out. She stands up abruptly, but after so much time in the wheelchair, so loses her footing and falls. She finds that she actually cannot get up now and burns to death in the fire.
13	Oct/Nov 1952	Johnny Craig	Hear No Evil!	Johnny Craig & Jack Kamen	A woman plots to poison her deaf husband with her lover after the husband survives an automobile accident, but she's unaware that the accident has restored his hearing and he hears every word the two plotters speak so that he switches the poison cup and that the lover drinks it while the police arrest the wife.
13	Oct/Nov 1952	Johnny Craig	First Impulse!	Sid Check	A thirty-year-old woman becomes distraught when she imagines that her 23-year-old sister is plotting to steal away the man she wants to marry, so when she secretly follows them and sees them picking out a ring, she shoots the both of them. It turns out that her sister was helping the man to pick out the ring for his proposal to the killer.
13	Oct/Nov 1952	Johnny Craig	Second Chance?	Sid Check	This story continues the last one, only this time her trigger finger isn't quite so quick. She gives them a chance to explain and then she goes upstairs for a good cry and a nap. When she wakes, she finds the two of them gone. She examines the ring and sees that it is inscribed to her sister and they just lied to her.
13	Oct/Nov 1952	Johnny Craig	A Question of Time!!	Al Williamson	When the sheriff finds the body of a woman with her face cut off he assumes that a man who married the local tramp finally found out about her and snapped so he goes to him and tells him all the rotten things about his wife trying to get him to confess because the jury will understand and probably go easy on him if he surrenders himself. The man refuses to accompany the sheriff, and this puzzles him, but he goes off telling the man he'll be back with a posse. The man refuses to go because he knows that he has not killed his wife, but he is so incensed by everything he's been told, that he kills her when she returns home.
13	Oct/Nov 1952	Johnny Craig	Forty Whacks!	Jack Kamen	This story postulates that Lizzie Borden's axe is cursed to make the children who find it murder their parents.
14	Dec/Jan 1953	Johnny Craig	Sweet Dreams!	Johnny Craig	A man plans to give his wife an overdose of sleeping pills to kill her, but while they are lying in bed she tells him that she saw what he did and switched cups, so he smothers her. He thinks he's going to die, but he wakes up fine the next morning. He calls the doctor and when the doctor arrives, he phones the police to report a murder. The husband is puzzled until the doctor tells him he only gave his wife a placebo bottle because she was a hypochondriac.
14	Dec/Jan 1953	Johnny Craig	The Perfect Place!	Jack Kamen	A man buys an isolated house to murder his wife and brick up her body in the cellar, but what he doesn't know is that the previous owner has done the same thing and confessed to the police after the sale of the house.
14	Dec/Jan 1953	Johnny Craig	The Electric Chair	Fred Peters	An American man tries to avoid the electric chair after killing his adulterous wife by fleeing into the subway but steps on the third rail, electrocuting him.
14	Dec/Jan 1953	Johnny Craig	The Hangman's Noose	Fred Peters	This story has the same premise as the previous one, but with three differences: the wife's lover is killed, it is set in England, and the murderer is strangled when his tie becomes stuck in the subway car door.
14	Dec/Jan 1953	Johnny Craig	The Guillotine	Fred Peters	This story has the same premise as the previous two, but with three differences: the wife and her lover are killed, it is set in France, and the man is beheaded by the subway car's wheels.
14	Dec/Jan 1953	Johnny Craig	Private Performance	Graham Ingels	A second-story man comes across a murder while pulling a job and attempts to hide from the madman. Unfortunately, he chooses to hide in the human pin cushion trunk for a famous illusionist.
15	Feb/March 1953	Johnny Craig	When the Cat's Away...	Johnny Craig	A man catches his best friend and wife together so he tells her that his friend has suffered a fatal accident because he knows she has a bad heart. The husband was supposed to have left town earlier so he knows that the friend will be coming over that evening. When he man knocks on the door, the shock kills the wife, and the husband shoots the best friend. He phones the police planning on telling them that he mistook his friend for a burglar in the dark.
15	Feb/March 1953	Johnny Craig	The Screaming Woman!	Jack Kamen	A man buries his wife alive in a lot and when a little girl hears her muffled screams, she can't get anyone to believe her. After the woman has been buried for some time she gives in to despair and sings a song quietly to herself but the little girl can still hear her under the dirt. She returns home and repeats the song to her father. The man finally believes his daughter as it turns out the victim of the crime is a woman he almost married years ago and the song was a song she had composed only for the two of them. He gets his friends together and they try to dig her up before she expires.
15	Feb/March 1953	Johnny Craig	Water, Water Everywhere...	George Evans	Two criminals escape in a boat that they bribed a guard for but they are betrayed as the guard does not bother to fill up the gas tank. They drift until one of them becomes delirious and drinks the water so the other shoots him and he pitches over the side. The survivor thinks too late that he could have drunk the dead man's blood. Finally, he shoots himself, not realizing that their boat is drifting on fresh water.
15	Feb/March 1953	Johnny Craig	...And Not a Drop to Drink	George Evans	This story has the same setup as the last one with the difference being a jeep instead of a boat. The surviving criminal shoots himself and the bullet passes through his head into the jeep's radiator, dropping water onto the corpse's mouth.
15	Feb/March 1953	Johnny Craig	Hail and Heart-y!	Graham Ingels	A woman with a lazy husband learns he's been faking having a heart condition so she murders him and uses his ash on the snow outside.
16	April/May 1953	Johnny Craig	Rendezvous!	Johnny Craig	An office pool takes out life insurance on any employee who flies as a little gag, but an embezzler sees a way out when it looks like he's going to be caught. He gives his manager a timebomb in a suitcase for his flight and then figures out where the plane should be in the desert when the bomb goes off. He drives out to make sure his boss does not survive and when the bomb goes off, the plane falls directly onto him.
16	April/May 1953	Johnny Craig	Fission Bait!	Jack Kamen	A man makes his fortune off the government's atomic bomb production and murders his wife to trade her in for a newer model. The cops pick him up when a prospector locates the body from the signal in the radium dial of his wife's watch.
16	April/May 1953	Johnny Craig	Come Clean!	Al Williamson	When an innocent man is strapped into the electric chair and sponges are applied it jogs his memory too late about a detail that could have saved him at his trial for the murder of a tramp he'd been with. The witness testified that a man wearing a gray coat had been seen leaving the victim's apartment the night she'd been killed, but he hadn't been wearing his gray coat that evening as he'd been unable to get a spot out of it with a sponge and it was sent to the cleaners.
16	April/May 1953	Johnny Craig	Who's Next!	Joe Orlando	When a barber finds out that the bank president has cuckolded him with his wife, he goes after him with a straight razor.
17	June/July 1953	Johnny Craig	Touch and Go!	Johnny Craig	After a man commits a murder he loses his mind by obsessing over removing his fingerprints from every single object in the house of the victim.
17	June/July 1953	Johnny Craig	One for the Money...	Jack Kamen	A gold-digger meets up with a rich old woman who brings her lunatic son pretty women once every year that he can mutilate.
17	June/July 1953	Johnny Craig	Fired!	Al Williamson & Frank Frazetta	A ranch hand picks the wrong woman to seduce when he tries to dump her and she brands his face with the branding iron.
17	June/July 1953	Johnny Craig	...Two for the Show!	Bill Elder	A man kills his wife and stuffs the body in a trunk to take on the train with him. When he notices a suspicious detective tailing him, switches tags on the trunk with one identical to it. Then he offers to show the detective the contents of the trunk. Unfortunately for him, he's switched it with the trunk used by the woman in the second story to get rid of her son's victim.
18	Aug/Sept 1953	Johnny Craig	Fall Guy for Murder	Johnny Craig	A man sets up a private investigator to kill his wife for him by asking him to investigate her disappearance. The man knows the P.I. will notice the clues that he has set down, so when he leaves a book detailing a similar plot he knows the P.I. will read it and assume that the man will attempt to kill him. The P.I. waits for the door of the apartment to open and fires off shots, killing the plotter's wife. The plotter trains a gun on him while picking up the phone to dial the police and thanks him for getting rid of his wife.
18	Aug/Sept 1953	Johnny Craig	Juice for the Record!	Bill Elder	When an electrician's no-good son is shot by one of his gangster associates after the boy shoots him and he dies the electrician plans to take the wrap for it and kill himself so that his boy has a second chance, but the son dies on the operating table so he thinks that he has made a confession onto a wax recording device for nothing. But the power failure which probably killed his son also spared him, because the cylinder that he gave to the police was blank without power to make the device function.
18	Aug/Sept 1953	Johnny Craig	Frozen Assets!	Jack Kamen	A man gets his girlfriend to marry a relative of a wealthy old lady so that when she dies they will inherit the money after disposing of the husband. The husband finds out about the scheme, however, so the murderer's time table is moved up. They knock him out and realize that now they'll have to kill him but the murderer knows he can't kill him without losing the money because that is how the will reads. He comes up with the idea of placing the body in the freezer for however long it takes the old woman to die and then thaw the body and pretend the man died recently. After four months the old woman finally passes away so they take the body out of the freezer and thaw it out, but their scheme is undone when the police conduct an autopsy.
18	Aug/Sept 1953	Johnny Craig	From Here to Insanity	Reed Crandall	A killer forces his way into an apartment and coaches an old woman on what to say to the police in the hall. The super is with the cops and he knows the woman can read lips but is deaf so he asks her a question through the door. The killer tells her what to respond and the super tells the police the killer must be inside. The police burst in and capture the madman.
19	Oct/Nov 1953	Al Feldstein	The Killer	Reed Crandall	A son doesn't want to follow in his father's footsteps, but he finds himself excluded from guilds, and so he does to marry. His work causes him to be away often. His wife asks him what he does for money but he refuses to tell her and so she eventually becomes unfaithful to him. She has an argument with a lover and stabs him and is condemned to be hanged. She is surprised to find out her husband's job. He is the hangman.
19	Oct/Nov 1953	Al Feldstein	Wined-Up!	George Evans	A woman plots to get rid of her husband whom she thinks is paralyzed by pulling his wheelchair into the lake by a thin wire that won't be noticed by the neighbors. It turns out that the husband was shaming his paralysis since the auto accident his wife caused because he suspected that she deliberately tried to kill him. Since his wife has a drink every time before she goes swimming in the lake, he spikes it, and when she develops a cramp and drowns he laughs in her face while treading water.
19	Oct/Nov 1953	Al Feldstein	Murder May Boomerang	Johnny Craig	reprint from Crime SuspenStories #1
19	Oct/Nov 1953	Al Feldstein	About Phase	George Evans	A man schemes to murder his wife and avoid the death penalty by claiming temporary insanity due to lycanthropy but he mistakenly chooses the evening to kill her upon with a moon eclipse.
20	Dec/Jan 1954	Johnny Craig	Fire Trap!	Johnny Craig	A woman and her lover plot to murder her husband by locking him in a corral with a wild horse and then setting it ablaze just to be sure, but the husband overhears them. He waits until his wife leaves, then strangles her lover and buries him in the cellar. He goes down to the corral to kill his wife, but she gets the drop on him and shoves him in the corral with the wild horse. The fire she sets panics the horse and the husband is trampled to death. The stablehands put out the fire and the police ask the widow her whereabouts during the fire. When she says the cellar, they go down to investigate and see one of her scarves poking out of the dirt. A tug pulls up the dead lover's head and the police arrest her for murder. She knows she can't defend herself without incriminating herself in her husband's killing.
20	Dec/Jan 1954	Johnny Craig	The Welchers	Jack Davis	A mobster allows two brothers one day before he drops them into the river with cement shoes to come up with the money he owes them. They resolve to murder their rich diabetic uncle, but they botch the attempt when one of them unknowingly gives the man a sucrose solution after the other gives him double-strength insulin and they cancel each other out. The mobster ends up dumping them into the river after all.
20	Dec/Jan 1954	Johnny Craig	Double Jeopardy	Jack Kamen	A man suspects his brother-in-law of plotting to murder his actress sister for her money, so when the brother-in-law brags about being able to tell his wife apart from other women blindfolded by just a kiss, he gets his sister to go along with a gag where they substitute a screen double in her bedroom when the husband unexpectedly phones to say that he'll be back that evening after he had announced plans to leave town. Several family friends burst out of the bathroom with a flash camera as the husband waves a bloody knife over the dead body of the unfortunate look alike.
20	Dec/Jan 1954	Johnny Craig	Plane Murder	Reed Crandall	When a woman's husband gets her lover killed by switching the prop of his stunt plane, she gets revenge by giving him a key for his handcuffed skydiving act that won't open the cuffs.
21	Feb/March 1954	Johnny Craig	Mother's Day	Reed Crandall	A woman resents her older boy because he reminds her of the husband who walked out on her with another baby on the way but he never stops loving her. The police arrive at the house one evening because the younger boy is a spoiled punk who robbed a store. The older brother takes the rap for a five-year sentence because he wants to spare his mother that pain. The younger brother is eventually shot by police and the older boy finishes his five-year sentence and returns to his mother. He pours his heart out about what had happened with his brother but his mother refuses to speak or even look at him. He tells her if everything he has done is not worth her love he will kill himself and does so. He is unaware that the woman has been completely paralyzed since her younger son struck her on the back of the head with a gun when she threatened to phone the police to have them remove the weapon.
21	Feb/March 1954	Johnny Craig	In the Groove	Jack Kamen	A radioman plots to murder his wife and use the station as his alibi by setting up enough selections that it will appear he is playing records at the time of his wife's death, but his scheme is undone when the needle gets stuck on the phonograph and one of the station personnel announces over the air that he's not in the booth.
21	Feb/March 1954	Johnny Craig	Understudies!	Johnny Craig	A man and woman each murder their abusive spouses and get away with it so that they can be with each other, but find that over time the same old abusive patterns reoccur.
21	Feb/March 1954	Johnny Craig	Blood Brothers	George Evans	A man murders his rich brother on the beach with an ax because he wants the inheritance. He wades into the surf to wash off the blood and is attacked by a shark.
22	April/May 1954	Johnny Craig	In Each and Every Package	Reed Crandall	A man dismembers his wife and buries the pieces in his back yard. He and his lover, who has had plastic surgery to stand in for his wife, get tickets to a quiz show called 'Treasure Hunt'. They are chosen as contestants and the host tells him that they're digging up his backyard to hide the prize money.
22	April/May 1954	Johnny Craig	Monotony	Bernard Krigstein	A bank clerk swindles a rich elderly lady out of fifty thousand dollars during his weekly visits for her grocery withdrawal since he knows that she will never miss it. His scheme unravels when she suddenly dies, however, and he knows an accounting of the estate will turn up the theft. He tries to flee town, but a knock at the door reveals to him that a bank official and another man are waiting outside. The clerk resolves to throw himself out the window rather than go to prison. The police are puzzled that he killed himself after the old woman left him one hundred and twenty thousand dollars in her will.
22	April/May 1954	Johnny Craig	Cinder Block	Jack Kamen	A woman and her lover plot to kill off her husband by making it appear as though a fire broke out due to smoking in bed. Because the husband is older than the wife and jealous, he has a habit of locking her in her bedroom on the eleventh floor. The wife's lover thinks it won't be a problem because the firemen will rescue her. The fire burns for a while but the firetruck doesn't arrive. The woman leaps from the window and the man tries to catch her but the impact kills them both. The reason the firetruck is late is that the man had not wanted to park his car outside the murder scene but parked it in front of the fire station, blocking the firetruck.
22	April/May 1954	Johnny Craig	Sight Unseen	Joe Orlando	A man pretends to be blind so that he can get away with shooting his wife and pretend that it was an accident, but he trips himself up by filling out a crossword puzzle that a detective notices in the evening paper.
23	June/July 1954	George Evans	This'll Kill You!	Reed Crandall	An April Fool's prank backfires on a bioweapons researcher when the victim of the prank takes it seriously and kills him.
23	June/July 1954	George Evans	Standing Room Only	Jack Kamen	A man murders his twin sister and her rich husband and attempts to pose as the woman to inherit the wealth. The estate lawyer phones the police when they go to a restaurant and the 'widow' enters the men's restroom.
23	June/July 1954	George Evans	Return Blow	Reed Crandall	A man sends a bomb to a rich old lady who has named him a beneficiary in her will, but she dies, so his girlfriend shows him the bomb package from the post office marked "deceased" just before it is timed to go off.
23	June/July 1954	George Evans	Last Resort	George Evans	A man murders his wife and dumps her body in the lake of a town they are visiting, but he doesn't know that the town is a tourist attraction because of the crystal clear water.
24	Aug/Sept 1954	George Evans	Double-Crossed	Reed Crandall	A man murders a millionaire who looks just like him to take his place, but what he doesn't know is that his victim has committed a murder witnessed by several people and the police arrest him for it.
24	Aug/Sept 1954	George Evans	Crushed Ice	Jack Kamen	A man shoots a woman's husband in Canada and he falls face-first into the fireplace. Badly burned, the corpse is dragged out over the frozen river and pushed through a hole cut in the ice. The woman and her lover are married, but the killer can't get that charred face out of his mind. Every night he dreams of the corpse rising out of the hole in the ice and stumbling towards him. He turns to drink and becomes a nervous wreck. A psychologist recommends that the two of them go on a cruise. The man feels better and the dreams have stopped, but the boat lurches suddenly. The two find themselves trapped in a small stateroom as an iceberg punctures the vessel. The last thing the two of them see coming towards them is the charred face of the man they murdered buried just beneath the surface of the ice.
24	Aug/Sept 1954	George Evans	Food for Thought	Joe Orlando	A miner murders the paymaster to steal the payroll and then becomes stuck in a cave-in. The telephone says that they'll be able to reach him in a week so he needs to conserve his lunchbox, but he replaced his food and thermos with the money he stole.
24	Aug/Sept 1954	George Evans	More Blessed to Give...	Bernard Krigstein	A husband plans to blow up his wife with a bomb placed in an anniversary cake and the wife plans to poison him with an anniversary bottle of wine. They see others going about their preparations so they switch tactics. The wife puts a bomb in the wine bottle which kills the husband, but she eats pieces of the cake which the husband had poisoned.
25	Oct/Nov 1954	Jack Kamen	Three for the Money	Jack Kamen	A woman tries to get two men to kill her husband, but she gets tired of waiting, so by the time the two finally shoot and stab him, he's been dead for a while since she poisoned him hours earlier.
25	Oct/Nov 1954	Jack Kamen	Dog Food	Reed Crandall	A prison convict feeds parts of his own body to the guard dogs in order to get to the sadistic overseer.
25	Oct/Nov 1954	Jack Kamen	Key Chain	Bernard Krigstein	A man suffers a nervous breakdown after plotting a diamond heist and being unable to find the correct key to a locksmith's front door after making a key to the intending victim's lodging and then knocking several trays of keys onto the floor. What he doesn't know is that the locksmith's front door has a broken lock and he could have left at any time.
25	Oct/Nov 1954	Jack Kamen	The Squealer	George Evans	A couple of bent cops beat the crooks that they bring in until they sign confessions which they use to blackmail the robbers into committing hauls for them. One of the policemen is doing it so that he'll have money to send his boy to college. He gets a call from his partner who has just brought in a kid and asks if he should begin the routine. The cop says yes and gets a phone call from his panicked partner a bit later because he hit the kid too hard and killed him. The officer notices that his son is not home and when he arrives at the police station, he looks down at the dead body of his boy lying on the floor.
26	Dec/Jan 1955	Jack Kamen	The Fixer	Jack Kamen	A poor family move into a middle-class neighborhood where they are treated with scorn. After several killings occur, suspicion falls on the father because he drinks and says he thinks his tormentors would be better off dead. One evening his wife accuses him of committing the murders because of a bloody kitchen knife. The two struggle over the knife and the woman is impaled. Remorseful, the man stabs himself to death. The two detectives figure the man was the killer, but the ten-year-old boy admits to them that he was 'fixing' things for his father and now he's killed all those people for nothing.
26	Dec/Jan 1955	Jack Kamen	Dead Center	Joe Orlando	A man suspects his wife and best friend of having an affair when they say that they are going to wrestling matches so he buys them first row tickets because he can watch the match on the TV and if they are not there he will have the proof he needs. When the bout is televised and the seats he paid for are vacant he draws the conclusion that his best friend and wife are cheating on him. When they return, even before the program is over, he blasts them with his gun. Only then does the announcer's voice come over the TV set and he realizes that he's been watching a wrestling bout that occurred in another state.
26	Dec/Jan 1955	Jack Kamen	The Firebug	Reed Crandall	The fire chief is a pyromaniac.
26	Dec/Jan 1955	Jack Kamen	Comeback	Jack Kamen	When a man stabs his wife to death with a letter opener given to him by his lover, he steals money and flees the country. Eventually he finds that he misses his girlfriend so much he returns only to learn that she was electrocuted for the murder of his wife since her prints were all over the murder weapon.
27	Feb/March 1955	Jack Kamen	Maniac at Large	George Evans	This story takes place from the perspective of a frightened librarian working after hours who has a premonition that the maniac at large is going to make her his eighth victim this evening. By the end of the story, the reader realizes that she is the maniac.
27	Feb/March 1955	Jack Kamen	Just Her Speed	Bernard Krigstein	A gunman threatens a man who works in a diner because he stole his girl from him. The clerk stalls for time, because he knows that a state trooper comes into the diner regularly at a certain time. He tells the gunman what he thinks are lies about what a tramp his wife is trying to make it sound like he regretted marrying her. When he finally sees the state trooper pull up, he rubs the gunman's face in what a saint his wife turned out to be since he thinks the gunman is about to be busted. Suddenly, a car speeds by and the trooper roars off after it. The enraged gunman smiles and empties his gun into the clerk. Further up the road, the state trooper has pulled over the car that has a man and the clerk's wife in it. She asks the officer not to inform her husband that she was out with another man since he thinks she's doing charity work and the officer replies "What you do in your personal life is your business ma'am. I didn't tell him about the others, did I?"
27	Feb/March 1955	Jack Kamen	Where There's Smoke...	Jack Kamen	A man plots to murder his wife by drugging her and starting a fire so that he can marry a younger woman who works for him. He abandons his plans as foolish when his employee quits so that she can marry her boyfriend, but what he didn't know is that his wife had the same idea.
27	Feb/March 1955	Jack Kamen	Good Boy	Graham Ingels	A father refuses to believe that his rotten son is anything but a good boy so much that even when detectives are looking for him because he has murdered someone, the father hides him in a closet. When the detectives move towards the closet to check it, the father seizes the gun and pumps bullets into it to prove that his son is not in there. After the detectives leave, he tearfully removes his son's lifeless body from the closet and admonishes him to be good.
