= Terroir (film) =

- Directed by: John Charles Jopson
- Screenplay by: John Charles Jopson
- Based on: "The Cask of Amontillado" by Edgar Allan Poe
- Produced by: Keith Carradine; Carlo Dusi; Caroline Zimmermann
- Starring: Keith Carradine; Salvatore Ferragamo; Gaetano Guarino
- Cinematography: John Charles Jopson
- Edited by: Grit Meyer
- Music by: Christian Henson
- Production companies: Ealing Studios; Dirty Poet Films; Met Film
- Release dates: September 20, 2014 (US); October 17, 2014 (Italy)
- Running time: 103 minutes
- Country: United States
- Languages: English; Italian

Terroir is a 2014 American-British-Italian mystery film written and directed by John Charles Jopson. It is based on Edgar Allan Poe's short story "The Cask of Amontillado". The film stars Keith Carradine, who also served as executive producer. The film premiered at the Wine Country Film Festival in 2014.

== Plot ==
Wealthy wine maker Jonathan Bragg (Keith Carradine) hires Tuscan wine detective Victor Borgo (Gaetano Guarino) to find the source of a mysterious bottle of wine, the "Oroboros". As Borgo follows the twisted, perilous trail, he descends deeper into an arcane Tuscan underworld, encountering an earth-worshiping wine cult and the dark side of human nature.

Jopson's screenplay brings Poe's short story "The Cask of Amontillado" into contemporary times and sets it the underworld of the Tuscan wine business. With references to Brunellopoli, the great Italian wine scandal of 2008 and with cameo appearances from real-world winemakers such as Salvatore Ferragamo and Luca Sanjust, the film brings a level of authenticity when it comes to the wine business.

In a nod to Poe's short story, in addition to the wine theme, Terroir features Masonic references and symbols as well as a terrifying scene in a wine cellar.

Terroir takes its name from the wine industry term terroir, which indicates that the natural environment in which a particular wine is produced affects the outcome, and thus the taste, including factors such as soil, topography, and climate. Together these elements determine the character of wine.

== Release ==
=== Premiere ===
Terroir had its world premiere on September 20, 2014 at the Wine Country Film Festival in Sonoma Valley, California. The film was presented "al fresco" at a specially built outdoor theater in the vineyards of Deerfield Ranch with a 33-foot Cinemascope screen and a Dolby 5.1 sound system. The festivities included a tribute to Keith Carradine and a screening of his 1977 film The Duellists. As part of his personal appearance Carradine performed his Academy Award winning song "I'm Easy" from the movie Nashville.

=== Video on demand ===
Terroir was released on Amazon.com in the United States, Canada, the United Kingdom, Germany and Japan on August 16, 2017.

=== Critical response ===
Poe scholar John Gruesser, in his review of Terroir wrote, "Stunningly beautiful in several places, with gorgeous shots of its Tuscan setting, Terroir evokes "The Cask of Amontillado" both explicitly and subtly, which should delight Poe fans. Speaking in voice-over at times, Bragg, the Montresor character (played by a terrific Keith Carradine), succeeds in leading Borgo, the Fortunato character, to his doom. He accomplishes this by exploiting his victim’s weak point (wine connoisseurship), even mentioning Luchesi at times to do so. Like Poe’s story, the film deftly uses masonic symbols, Latin phrases, a coat of arms, and a family motto."

Stephen Ashton, in his review for the Wine Country Film Festival wrote, "Filmed in some of Tuscany's most scenic wine estates Terroir features authentic wine-making traditions, sensual cinematography, and occult rituals derived from the secret rites of real-life erotic cults. The film is laced with authentic wine lore thanks to some of Tuscany's finest winemakers including Salvatore Ferragamo who are in this luscious drama."

On entertainment website Collider, Anja Djuricic authored an article entitled "The 10 Best Edgar Allan Poe Movies to Watch After 'The Pale Blue Eye'". She wrote, "Decades after Price and Corman dominated the horror genre with their adaptations, Keith Carradine starred in another unexpectedly well-made Poe adaptation called Terroir. This is an indie movie, but it was decently made and Carradine gives his best to bring the mysterious wine connoisseur to life - for lovers of this tale, this could be an interesting watch."
