= White Gold (2003 film) =

- Poster
- Directed by: Viktor Ivanov
- Written by: John Jopson; Viktor Ivanov
- Produced by: Fyodor Popov
- Starring: Josh Holland; Gleb Plaksin; Aleksandr Dyachenko; Yevgeni Sidikhin
- Music by: Sergei Chekryjov
- Distributed by: Stella Studio
- Release date: September 12, 2003
- Running time: 91 min.
- Language: Russian/English
- Budget: unknown

White Gold (Russian: Белое золото) is a 2003 Russian action film directed by Viktor Ivanov from a screenplay by John Jopson and Viktor Ivanov. The story begins with the actual events of 1919 when a White Army train carrying the bulk of the Russian Empire's gold reserves arrives empty at Siberia's Irkutsk station. The adventure begins when, decades later, the grandson of a White Army officer inherits a map to the treasure.
