= Fred Peters (artist) =

American animator and comics artist

- Born: January 22, 1923; Avant, Oklahoma, U.S.
- Died: May 18, 2018 (aged 95); Reading, Massachusetts, U.S.
- Occupation: Artist
- Known for: Disney and Boston Globe Artist

Fredrick Don Peters Jr. (January 22, 1923 – May 18, 2018) was an American animator and comics artist who contributed to Disney, EC Comics and the Boston Globe.

He was born in Avant, Oklahoma and grew up in Webb City with his parents Fred Sr. and Elvira Tharp with his brother Dan, who both graduated from Webb City High School

He married Alice Moore and had four children: Stephen, Patti, Brad and Kenny.

His draft card was dated on June 29, 1942, in Osage County.

== Influences ==
Among his early graphic influences were Harold Foster's 'Prince Valiant', Alex Raymond's 'Flash Gordon' and Bob Kane and Bill Finger's 'Batman'. He went to art schools in Oklahoma and Minnesota.

== Animation work ==
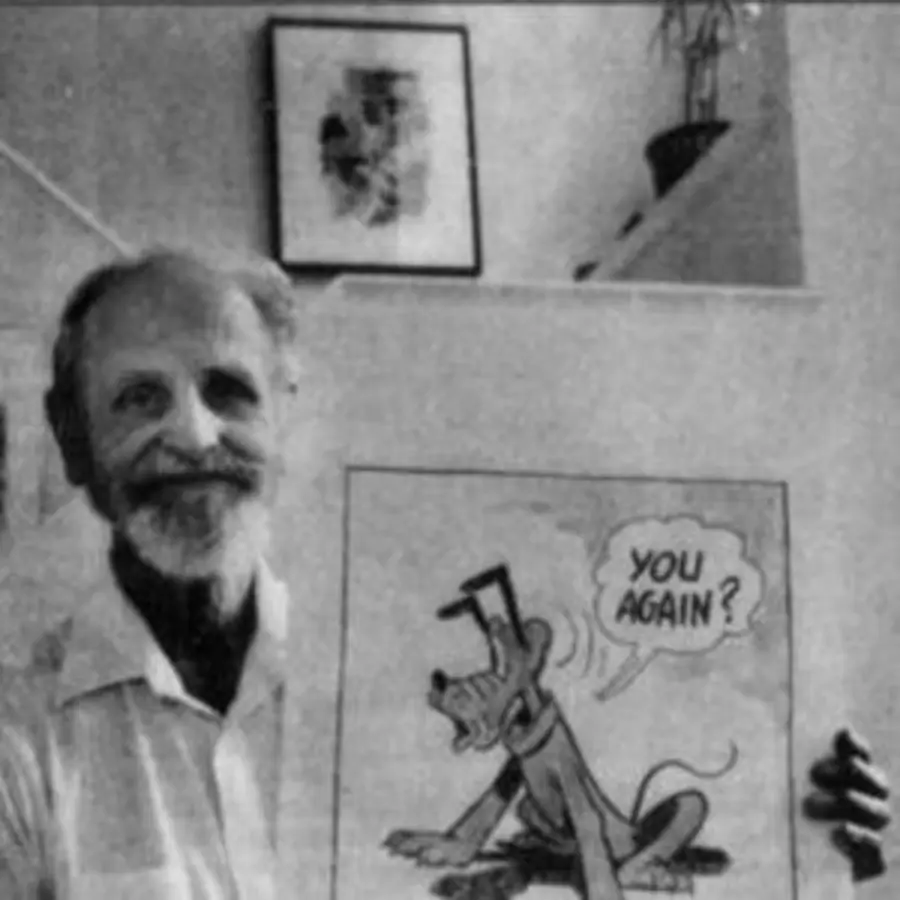
Fred Peters with his drawing of Pluto

Near the mid-1940s, Peters moved to California, where he was hired as an animator at the Walt Disney Studios. He walked in with his illustrations and was hired on the spot. He's quoted saying, "It was the best place he had ever worked." He contributed to pictures as 'Bambi' (1942), where he illustrated a waterfall scene, and animated Jiminy Cricket in his second movie appearance in the anthology picture 'Fun and Fancy Free' (1946). But he was mostly preoccupied with the Pluto cartoons, for which he animated hundreds of cartoons.

== EC Comics ==
Peters eventually left Disney to start his own studio in New York with a friend. When this attempt failed, he became an illustrator of animated TV commercials, illustrated advertisements, color slides and comic strips. In 1949, he became a freelance illustrator and comics artist joining EC Comics. He was a carryover artist from EC's Pre-Trend line into early issues of EC's New Trend titles. He helped make many good comics, and people at his work said that he was a brilliant drawer and that he often made masterpieces of art. He made contributions to their western 'Gunfighter', 'Saddle Justice' and crime titles 'Crime Patrol', 'War Against Crime'. Peters was present in two early comic books of EC's groundbreaking "New Trend" line. He illustrated three "EC quickies" for 'Crime SuspenStories' issue #14 (December 1952), dealing with death from electrocution, hanging and decapitation. In the 32nd issue of Tales From the Crypt (October-November 1952), he illustrated the story 'Cutting Cards', about two rival gamblers who try to compete with one another in terms of gruesome crimes.

Fred Peters' "Perfect Murder" from War Against Crime #10 (1949).

=== HBO ===
Peters illustrated the story "Cutting Cards" in Tales From the Crypt #32 (October–November 1952), which was adapted for the second season of HBO's Tales from the Crypt television series. TV.com noted:

In the comic story the gamblers' names are Lou Crebis and Gus Forney. In the episode, their names are Reno Crevice and Sam Forney. Walter Hill actually used some of the original panels from the comic story to help storyboard this episode.

== Boston Globe ==
Peters settled down in Boston, where he worked for the newspaper Boston Globe for 32 years starting October 7, 1951, illustrating hundreds of articles along with creating comics Expressway Blues and 'Word Wizard' (with writer S.G. Backus) until January 27, 1985.

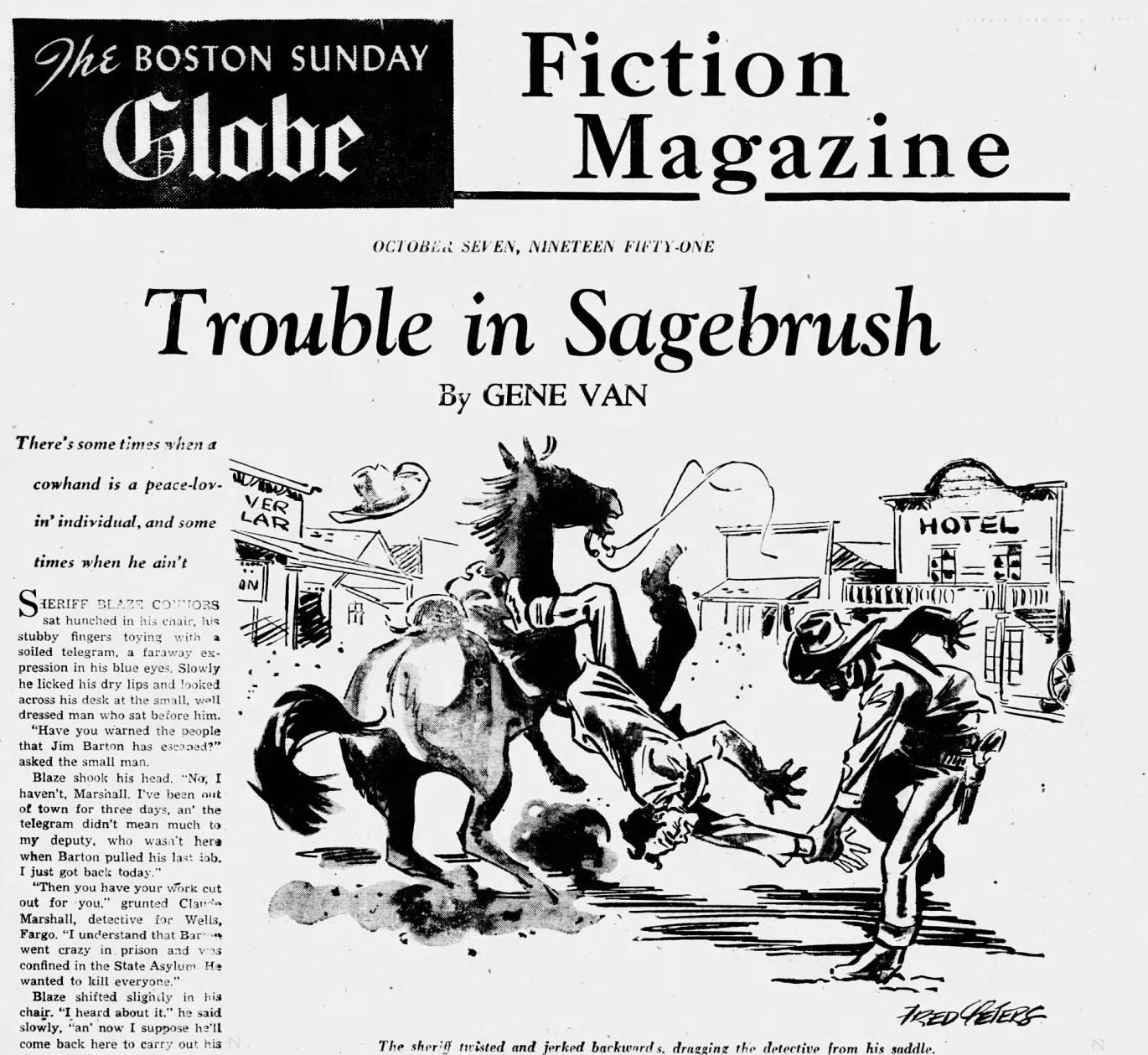
Peters first illustration for the Boston Globe October 7, 1951

== Death ==
After his retirement, he became a member of several art associations in Massachusetts, New Hampshire and Florida, including a charter member of The Reading Art Association. and taught watercolor painting classes in these states. Fred Peters died on May 18, 2018, at the age of 95.

== Bibliography ==
=== EC Comics ===
- Crime Patrol #15 "Johnny Sparr" (1949)
- War Against Crime #10 "The Perfect Murder" (1950)
- Gunfighter #13 "The Old Prospector's Tale: The Day of Death..." (1950)
- Gunfighter #14 "The Old Prospector's Tale: Ramsey's Revenge!" (1950)
- Crime SuspenStories #14 "The Hangman's Noose" and "The Guillotine" (1952)
- Tales From the Crypt #32 "Cutting Cards" (1952)
