= Sid Check =

American comic book artist (1930–2002)

- Born: August 2, 1930 Newark, New Jersey
- Died: June 19, 2002 (aged 71) Coney Island
- Areas: Penciller, Artist, Inker

Sidney Check, also known as Sid Check, (August 2, 1930 – June 19, 2002) was an American comic book artist best known for his stories in EC Comics.

Sidney Charles Check was born on August 2, 1930, in Newark, New Jersey. His parents Abraham Check and Ida Applebaum-Check were Polish immigrants who had come to the United States in 1926. By 1940 he was living in Coney Island, Brooklyn where he befriended Frank Frazetta with whom he would collaborate in comic books a decade later. In 1948 Check graduated from the School of Industrial Art in Manhattan, and the following year he broke into comic books, working with Wally Wood, as well as on solo assignments.

Sid Check was often compared to Wally Wood because of a stylistic resemblance. His work appeared in EC's New Trend titles: Crime SuspenStories, The Haunt of Fear, The Vault of Horror and Weird Science. He drew for several Marvel Comics series, including Weird Wonder Tales, Battle Action, Journey into Unknown Worlds. For Magazine Enterprises he contributed to White Indian. He also drew for Classics Illustrated and for Harvey Comics' Tomb of Terror.

Apocolytes's World of Comics commented:

Little is known about artist Sid Check, aside from the fact that he was a contemporary of fellow artists Wallace Wood, Joe Orlando and Harry Harrison, among others, in the 50s. When Wood and Orlando began their early art collaborations, Sid Check as well as Harrison were also fellow members of the same art studio. It isn't surprising that all four of them would soon be working for the same publisher, EC Comics, doing work with remarkably similar styles. To the untrained eye, Check's work can often be mistaken for Wood's. Check's art is generally engaging and attractive, if not entirely as well constructed as Wood's art was. Less prolific than Wood certainly, Check's work in comic books was short-lived, from December 1951 through 1958 mostly...

When Check left comic books in 1958, he took up work with the United States Postal Service. Though he drew a few stories in the early 1970s for DC Comics' war titles, and spot illustrations for Amazing Stories during the mid-1970s.

He died on June 19, 2002, in Coney Island.

== Sources ==
- GCD
