= Gleb Plaksin =

Russian actor (1925–2008)

Gleb Vasilyevich Plaksin
- Глеб Васильевич Плаксин
- Born: 16 August 1925; Lyon, France
- Died: 21 November 2008 (aged 83); Moscow, Russia
- Occupations: Actor, musician

Gleb Vasilyevich Plaksin (Note: Russian: Глеб Васильевич Плаксин, romanized: Gleb Vasilyevich Plaksin) (16 August 1925 – 21 November 2008) was a French-born Soviet and Russian film actor and musician.

== Biography ==
Gleb Plaksin was born in Lyon, France where his Russian family settled down following the Russian Civil War. His father Vasily Stepanovich Plaksin was a Russian nobleman from Nizhny Novgorod who served as an officer in the hussar regiment of the Imperial Russian Army. His mother Nadezhda Damianovna Plaksina (née Snitko, 1899—1949) (ru) was a Sister of Charity from Saint Petersburg. Her elder brother Ivan Snitko (1896—1981) (ru) would become a decorated Soviet counter admiral. Also, according to Gleb, his maternal grandmother was a close relative of Henryk Sienkiewicz. Both of his parents took part in the World War I during which Nadezhda Snitko was awarded the Order of St. George of three classes. They met at a hospital in Simferopol and married. Later they also took part in the civil war together, but had to leave Russia for France.

Gleb studied music at the Conservatoire de Paris and became a professional piano player. After the Nazi invasion of France he became a member of the French Resistance. The multilingual teenager fought as a member of the American army after the Allies finally landed in France in 1944. After the war he continued his musical career.

In 1955 Gleb and his father immigrated to the Soviet Union. He worked as a pianist in Leningrad and then — as a radio presenter at the international department of Gosteleradio in Moscow. He also became known for his various roles in the Soviet cinema. He also took part in dubbing (over 200 foreign movies).

Plaksin was awarded the title of Honoured Artist of the Russian Federation in 2001. In 2003 he starred in the Russian action film White Gold.

He died in 2008 and was buried at the Vostryakovo Cemetery in Moscow.

He was decorated as a Resistance member, soldier, and actor by the Soviet Union, the Russian Federation, the United States, and France; his recognition included the Croix de Guerre, the French decoration awarded for military heroism.

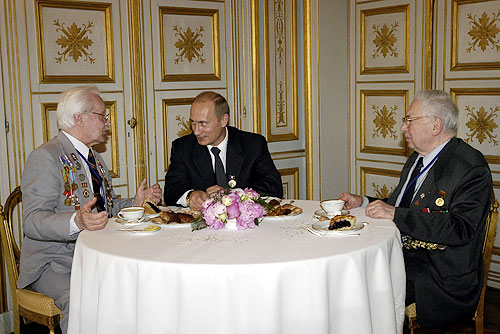
President Vladimir Putin met with Russian veterans of the allied operations in Normandy, Oleg Ozerov and Gleb Plaksin (to the left), Caen, France, 2004

== Selected filmography ==
- The Secret Agent's Blunder (1968) — chief of the foreign intelligence agency
- The Adjutant of His Excellency (1969) — French general
- The Red Tent (1969) — reporter
- The Secret Agent's Fate (1970) — chief of the foreign intelligence agency
- The Crown of the Russian Empire, or Once Again the Elusive Avengers (1971) — restaurant visitor
- Monologue (1972) — foreign attendant at a congress
- Countermeasure (1974) - radio news announcement
- Story of an Unknown Man (1980)
- Charodei (1982) — member of the academic council
- Mother (1990) — judge
- Chernobyl: The Final Warning (1991) — Hammer's Assistant
- Quiet Flows the Don (1992-2006) — foreigner
- The Russian Singer (1993) — general Pannyukov
- Bram Stoker's Burial of the Rats (1995) — Mr. Stoker (as Eduard Plaxin)
- Hellfire (1995) — Henri
- Secrets of Palace coup d'etat (2003) — Khrizologus
- White Gold (2003) — academician
