= Viktor Ivanov (stunt coordinator) =

Viktor Ivanov (sometimes credited as Victor Ivanov) is a Russian film director and veteran stunt coordinator best known for the feature film White Gold and for his design of the spectacular car chase through the streets of Moscow in The Bourne Supremacy, for which he won the "Best Vehicle" award at the 2005 Taurus World Stunt Awards.
