= Krause Publications =

American publisher of hobby magazines and books

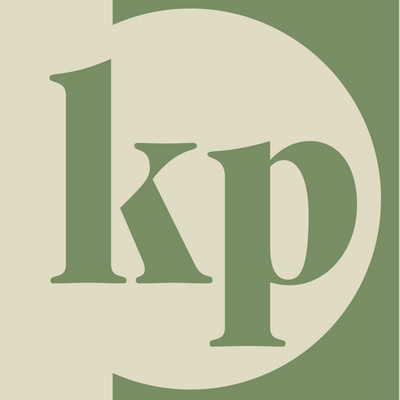
- Status: Active
- Founded: 1952
- Founder: Chester L. Krause
- Country of origin: United States
- Headquarters location: Stevens Point, Wisconsin
- Publication types: Magazines, books
- Nonfiction topics: Numismatics, coin collecting
- Owner: Penguin Random House
- Official website: sites.prh.com/krausepublications

Krause Publications is an American publisher of hobby magazines and books. The company was started by Chester L. Krause (1923–2016) in 1952 and published Numismatic News.

In the coin collecting community, the company is best known for its Standard Catalog of World Coins, a series of coin catalogs commonly referred to as Krause-Mishler catalogs or simply Krause catalogs; they provide information, pricing, and Krause-Mishler (KM) numbers referring to coin rarity and value. Krause-Mishler (named for Krause and longtime employee Clifford Mishler) numbers are the most common way of assigning values to coins. The first edition was published in 1972. In addition, they established the Coin of the Year Award, first issued in 1984, for excellence in coinage design.

In the paper money collecting community, the company is known for its paper money catalogs. In 1975, the first edition of the seminal Standard Catalog of World Paper Money authored by Albert Pick was published. Its numbering system, the Pick numbers, is widely used to identify banknotes.

Krause Publications was founded and based in Iola, Wisconsin, and, for a short time, in Stevens Point, Wisconsin.

== History ==
In 1992, Krause acquired Deer & Deer Hunting and Turkey & Turkey Hunting magazines from Stump Sitters, Inc.

In 1997, Krause acquired the non-automotive book titles of the Chilton Company. In June 2002 Krause was acquired by F+W (back then F&W Publications). At that time, Krause Publications was publishing 46 periodicals and had nearly 750 books in print. Krause Publications was continued by F+W as an imprint.

The company moved to Stevens Point, Wisconsin in April 2018.

In June 2019, the assets of F+W were sold through bankruptcy auctions. Penguin Random House acquired the book publishing assets and Krause brand. The magazines were divided among different entities, with Numismatic News, for example, being acquired by Active Interest Media. The 2019 edition of the Standard Catalog of World Coins included XX and XXI century editions. Penguin published the 2020 edition of the XX Century Standard Catalog of World Coins, but the XXI century edition was not released.

The assets of Deer & Deer Hunting and its supporting outdoors products were acquired in June 2019 by Media 360 LLC of Waupaca, Wisconsin, headed up by President Brad Rucks and Vice President Daniel Schmidt.

== See also ==
- Blade – a magazine aimed at knife collectors
- Comics Buyer's Guide
- Goldmine – a magazine aimed at record collectors
- Sports Collectors Digest
