= Standard Catalog of World Coins =

Series of numismatic catalogs

The Standard Catalog of World Coins is a series of numismatic catalogs, commonly known as the Krause catalogs. They are published by Krause Publications, a division of Active Interest Media.

== Overview ==
The by-century volumes list by date virtually every coin type, most of which are photographed, with mintage and other information, plus market valuations in up to 5 grades. Listings are by denomination rather than series, as in earlier World coin catalogs. The proprietary Krause-Mishler (or KM) numbers are widely used; for just a few countries earlier systems such as Y (Yeoman) and C (Craig) numbers are given instead.

The century format is considered inconvenient and expensive by some who collect geographically, because date listings are clipped at the century mark. Originally covering 1835 or so to date, the main catalog (first edition 1972) evolved into an annual 20th century-only work, plus separate 17th, 18th, and 19th century volumes which are revised on a three-year cycle. Beginning with the 34th (2007) ed, listings covering 2001 to date are included in a separate 21st Century catalog.

Data from the by-century volumes are collated together in special editions for Crowns, Gold, German, and North American coins. Fantasies and medallion issues, which do not appear in the other catalogs, are covered in a publication called Unusual World Coins. There is also a publication called Collecting World Coins that includes only 20th- and 21st-century coins that circulated regularly.

The 12th (1986) and 19th (1992) are two-volume hardcovers covering 1700-date; 13th (1987) is the last edition to include cross-references to Yeoman and Craig; 23rd (1996) is the last main edition covering 1800-date; 33rd (2006) is the last 20th century edition including 21st century listings.

List priced at $73 to $85 ($25 for the shorter 21st century catalog) they are often discounted, and can be found in many public libraries. Older editions are steeply discounted even though revisions between editions in many areas are minimal. Following the appearance of unlicensed DVD versions, DVDs were included with the 1601-1700 4th edition, the 1901-2000 36th edition, and possibly others, but are now sold as a separate product.

In 1975, the Catalog comprised a single volume with about 1,000 pages. By 2007, it had expanded to a five-volume set with more than 6,000 pages in total.

Early editions attribute authorship to the publisher Chester L. Krause, and Clifford Mishler, although starting with the second edition Colin R. Bruce II was the actual chief compiler and is given an editor or senior editor title on later editions. According to Coin World, Bruce was the lead cataloger and editor of every annual edition from 1976 through 2007, retiring in 2008. George S. Cuhaj is the current editor, with Thomas Michael credited as market analyst, although Krause collate contributions from many collecting experts and dealers.

== Edition ==
Most recent editions, as of November 2019.

Standard Catalog of World Coins

1. Standard Catalog of World Coins: 1601–1700, 7th Edition, publication date 2018, Krause Publications, ISBN 978-1-4402-4857-3
2. Standard Catalog of World Coins: 1701–1800, 7th Edition, publication date 2016, Krause Publications, ISBN 978-1-4402-4706-4
3. Standard Catalog of World Coins: 1801–1900, 9th Edition, publication date 2019, Krause Publications, ISBN 978-1-4402-4895-5
4. 2020 Standard Catalog of World Coins: 1901–2000, 47th Edition, publication date 2019, Krause Publications, ISBN 978-1-4402-4896-2
5. 2020 Standard Catalog of World Coins: 2001–Date, 14th Edition, publication date 2019, Krause Publications, ISBN 978-1-4402-4897-9

All with digital copy available separately.

Other related catalogs

- Collecting World Coins: Standard Catalog of Circulating Coinage: 1901–present, 15th Edition, publication date 2015, Krause Publications, ISBN 978-1-4402-4460-5
  Digital copy available separately.
- Standard Catalog of German Coins: 1501–present, 3rd Edition, publication date 2011, Krause Publications, ISBN 978-1-4402-1402-8
  Digital copy available separately.
- Standard Catalog of World Crowns and Talers from 1601 to date, 1st Edition, publication date 1994, Krause Publications, ISBN 978-0-8734-1211-7
- Standard Catalog of World Gold Coins: With Platinum and Palladium Issues: 1601–present, 6th Edition, publication date 2009, Krause Publications, ISBN 978-1-4402-0424-1
  Digital copy available separately.
- Unusual World Coins, 6th Edition, publication date 2011, Krause Publications, ISBN 978-1-4402-1702-9
  Digital copy available separately.

== See also ==
- Coin catalog
- Standard Catalog of World Paper Money
- A Guide Book of United States Coins
