= Numismatic News =

American numismatic magazine

- Cover of the February 11, 2020 issue of Numismatic News
- Type: Special-interest magazine
- Format: Weekly magazine
- Publisher: Active Interest Media
- Editor: Sophia Mattimiro
- Founded: October 13, 1952; 72 years ago
- Language: English

Numismatic News is an American numismatic magazine which has been in circulation since 1952.

== History ==
Numismatic News was founded by Chester L. Krause, and the first issue appeared on 13 October 1952. The publisher was by Krause Publications based in Iola, Wisconsin. The company was absorbed by F+W Media in 2002, before the company declared bankruptcy in March 2019. In October 2019, it was acquired by Active Interest Media. It is published 32 times a year.

In early 2023, Numismatic News discontinued its practice of printing monthly coin values in favor of printing them quarterly. In May that year, it absorbed its sister publication Coins, adding the latter's columns and writers into the fold.

== Content ==
Numismatic News features a variety of content in each issue. As a weekly publication, the magazine focuses on week-by-week market trends and coin values. In addition, columns by its writers focus on timely events and trends in the numismatic world, such as upcoming conventions (and recaps), new programs and releases from the United States Mint, and bullion values. Unlike its sister publication Coins, Numismatic News focuses more on current events in the world of numismatics. R.W. Julian contributes articles to each issue.

Each issue features several different columns, including:

Facts About Fakes: A counterfeit detection column.

AnnounceMINTS: A column focusing on new releases from the United States Mint.

Coin Clinic: A reader-supported question and answer column

On the Scene: A column by Clifford Mishler in which he recaps recent numismatic conventions and coin shows

Making the Grade: Coin authentication and grading column

Bargain Collector: Focusing on some of the best "bang for your buck" buys in coins

Past Times With Coins: A column highlighting the history of Coins magazine written by former editor Robert R. Van Ryzin

Item of the Week: An in-depth look at one specific coin issue (i.e. 1804 large cent) each week

In addition, the magazine's "Coin Market: At a Glance" column contains values for various coin series (generally focusing on one series per issue), and has also focused on the overall coin market. The first magazine issue each month also features a "Coin Market" section consisting of several pages of coin values, and all issues have an upcoming coin show directory listed by state.
