= Writer's Market =

Defunct annual reference book for writers

Writer's Market (WM) was an annual reference book for freelance writers published by Writer's Digest Books from 1921 to 2021. It was sometimes called "the freelancer's bible."

== Overview ==
Writer's Market was intended as practical resource for freelance writers. It featured directories of agents, publishers, consumer and trade magazines, and other markets for writers to sell their work, as well as contests and professional organizations. Each listing contained submission instructions, accepted types of work, and contact information. The front section featured articles on related topics, such as starting a freelancing business, print syndication, freelancing for magazines, and a chart of payment rates concerning various writing assignments.

In 2019, Writer's Digest's then-parent company, F+W Media, was auctioned off as part of bankruptcy proceedings. Penguin Random House LLC acquired Writer's Digest Books, including the Market Books and WritersMarket.com, while Active Interest Media purchased everything else under the Writer's Digest brand, including the magazine and website.

=== Other "Market Books" ===
Writer's Market is one of nine "market books" published yearly by Writer's Digest Books. Others include: Guide to Literary Agents, Photographer's Market, Children's Writer's & Illustrator's Market, Novel & Short Story Writer's Market, Artist and Graphic Designer's Market, Poet's Market, Screenwriter's & Playwright's Market and Songwriter's Market. Each book is designed to give writers instructions on submitting freelance work to markets.

In 2012, Donald Altschiller referred to Writer's Market as a "mini-industry, dominating the information market for freelance writers".

== Reception and Use ==
In a 2007 review for Library Journal (LJ), Savannah Schroll Guz wrote Writer's Market is "widely recognized as the freelancer's bible." In 2018, LJ gave Poetry Market a starred review and called the Market Books "essential references for most libraries."

Several authors used Writer's Market early in their careers, including J.M. Dillard, Diana Gabaldon, Amanda Hocking, Jhumpa Lahiri, Malinda Lo, Michelle Moran, Barbara Park, and George Singleton.
