= Watercolor Artist =

American special-interest magazine

Watercolor Artist, formerly Watercolor Magic, is an American bi-monthly magazine that focuses on watermedia techniques, trends and artists. As of June 2006, it had a print run of more than 90,000.

== History and profile ==
Watercolor Artist was established in 1984. The magazine was published bimonthly by F+W Media, which also published numerous other magazines, such as Writer's Digest.

The headquarters of Watercolor Artist is in Blue Ash, Ohio. The magazine was, along with The Artist's Magazine and The Pastel Journal, acquired by Macanta Investments and became part of the Peak Media Properties. A typical article consists of several columns at the beginning and end of the magazine, while up-and-coming and prolific watercolorists are featured in the center of the publication.
