= Antiques Info =

Bi-monthly antiques publication

- Categories: Antiques art
- Frequency: Bi-monthly
- Founded: 1993
- Final issue: 2014
- Company: Antiques Information Services Ltd.
- Country: United Kingdom
- Based in: Kent
- Language: English
- Website: www.antiques-info.co.uk

Antiques Info was a bi-monthly antiques publication that focused on auction reports, news, features and articles relating to the antiques' industry, including details of auction sales and fairs, book reviews, and reader valuations and letters.

== Overview ==
The magazine was founded in 1993 and went into voluntary liquidation late 2014. It had regular bi-monthly columns including news on upcoming auctions and sales. The magazine was part of Antiques Information Services Ltd. It was based in Kent.

It was relaunched in 2015 as a free online magazine, with the new owner having absolutely no involvement in the previous Antiques Info magazine.

== See also ==
- Antique Trader
