= Equilibrium moisture content =

Moisture content at which a material is neither gaining nor losing moisture

Equilibrium moisture content of wood versus humidity and temperature, according to the Hailwood-Horrobin equation.

The equilibrium moisture content (EMC) of a hygroscopic material surrounded at least partially by air is the moisture content at which the material is neither gaining nor losing moisture. The value of the EMC depends on the material and the relative humidity and temperature of the air with which it is in contact. The speed with which it is approached depends on the properties of the material, the surface-area-to-volume ratio of its shape, and the speed with which humidity is carried away or towards the material (e.g. diffusion in stagnant air or convection in moving air).

== Grains ==
The moisture content of grains is an essential property in food storage. The moisture content that is safe for long-term storage is 12% for corn, sorghum, rice and wheat and 11% for soybean

At a constant relative humidity of air, the EMC will drop by about 0.5% for every increase of 10 °C air temperature.

The following table shows the equilibriums for a number of grains (data from). These values are only approximations since the exact values depend on the specific variety of a grain.

		Corn kernels				Soybean				Sorghum				Long Grain Rice				Durum Wheat			
	°C	1.7	10.0	21.1	37.8	1.7	10.0	21.1	37.8	1.7	10.0	21.1	37.8	1.7	10.0	21.1	37.8	1.7	10.0	21.1	37.8
RH	°F	35	50	70	100	35	50	70	100	35	50	70	100	35	50	70	100	35	50	70	100
25		9.3	8.6	7.9	7.1	5.9	5.7	5.5	5.2	11.5	10.9	10.2	9.3	9.2	8.6	8.0	7.3	8.3	8.0	7.7	7.2
30		10.3	9.5	8.7	7.8	6.5	6.3	6.1	5.7	12.1	11.5	10.8	9.9	10.1	9.5	8.8	8.0	8.9	8.7	8.3	7.7
35		11.2	10.4	9.5	8.5	7.1	6.9	6.6	6.2	12.7	12.1	11.4	10.5	10.9	10.3	9.5	8.7	9.6	9.3	8.9	8.3
40		12.1	11.2	10.3	9.2	7.8	7.6	7.3	6.9	13.3	12.7	12.0	11.1	11.7	11.0	10.3	9.4	10.2	9.9	9.5	8.8
45		13.0	12.0	11.0	9.9	8.6	8.3	8.0	7.5	13.8	13.3	12.6	11.7	12.5	11.8	11.0	10.0	10.9	10.5	10.1	9.4
50		13.9	12.9	11.8	10.6	9.4	9.1	8.8	8.3	14.4	13.8	13.2	12.3	13.3	12.5	11.7	10.7	11.5	11.2	10.7	10.0
55		14.8	13.7	12.6	11.3	10.3	10.0	9.7	9.1	15.0	14.4	13.8	12.9	14.1	13.3	12.4	11.3	12.2	11.9	11.4	10.6
60		15.7	14.5	13.4	12.0	11.5	11.1	10.7	10.1	15.6	15.1	14.4	13.6	14.9	14.0	13.1	12.0	13.0	12.6	12.1	11.3
65		16.6	15.4	14.2	12.8	12.8	12.4	11.9	11.3	16.3	15.7	15.1	14.3	15.7	14.8	13.8	12.7	13.8	13.4	12.8	12.0
70		17.6	16.3	15.0	13.6	14.4	14.0	13.5	12.7	17.0	16.5	15.8	15.0	16.6	15.7	14.6	13.4	14.7	14.3	13.7	12.8
75		18.7	17.3	16.0	14.5	16.4	16.0	15.4	14.5	17.8	17.3	16.7	15.9	17.6	16.5	15.5	14.2	15.8	15.4	14.7	13.8
80		19.8	18.5	17.0	15.4	19.1	18.6	17.9	17.0	18.8	18.2	17.6	16.9	18.6	17.5	16.4	15.1	17.1	16.6	16.0	15.0
85		21.2	19.8	18.2	16.5	22.9	22.3	21.6	20.5	19.9	19.4	18.8	18.0	19.8	18.7	17.5	16.1	18.8	18.3	17.6	16.5
90		22.9	21.4	19.8	17.9	28.9	28.2	27.3	26.1	21.4	20.9	20.3	19.6	21.3	20.1	18.9	17.4	21.3	20.7	20.0	18.8

== Wood ==
The moisture content of wood below the fiber saturation point is a function of both relative humidity and temperature of surrounding air. The moisture content (M) of wood is defined as:

$$M = \frac{m-m_{od}}{m_{od}}$$

where m is the mass of the wood (with moisture) and $m_{od}$ is the oven-dry mass of wood (i.e. no moisture). If the wood is placed in an environment at a particular temperature and relative humidity, its moisture content will generally begin to change in time, until it is finally in equilibrium with its surroundings, and the moisture content no longer changes in time. This moisture content is the EMC of the wood for that temperature and relative humidity.

The Hailwood-Horrobin equation for two hydrates is often used to approximate the relationship between EMC, temperature (T), and relative humidity (h):

$$M_{\mathrm{eq}}=\frac{1800}{W}\left[\frac{kh}{1-kh}\,+\,\frac{k_1kh+2k_1k_2k^2h^2}{1+k_1kh+k_1k_2k^2h^2}\right]$$

where M_{eq} is the equilibrium moisture content (percent), T is the temperature (degrees Celsius), h is the relative humidity (fractional) and:

$$W  = 349 + 1.29\,T + 0.0135\,T^2$$
$$k  = 0.805 + 7.36\times 10^{-4}\,T - 2.73\times 10^{-6}\,T^2$$
$$k_1= 6.27 - 9.38\times 10^{-3}\,T - 3.03\times 10^{-4}\,T^2$$
$$k_2= 1.91 + 4.07\times 10^{-2}\,T - 2.93\times 10^{-4}\,T^2$$

For temperature in degrees Fahrenheit, :$W,k,k_1,k_2$ are determined as:

$$W  = 330   + 0.452\,T              + 0.00415\,T^2$$
$$k  = 0.791 + 4.63\times 10^{-4}\,T - 8.44\times 10^{-7}\,T^2$$
$$k_1= 6.34  + 7.75\times 10^{-4}\,T - 9.35\times 10^{-5}\,T^2$$
$$k_2= 1.09  + 2.84\times 10^{-2}\,T - 9.04\times 10^{-5}\,T^2$$

This equation does not account for the slight variations with wood species, state of mechanical stress, and/or hysteresis. It is an empirical fit to tabulated data provided in the same reference, and closely agrees with the tabulated data. For example, at T=140 deg F, h=0.55, EMC=8.4% from the above equation, while EMC=8.0% from the tabulated data.

== Sands, soils and building materials ==
Materials such as stones, sand and ceramics are considered 'dry' and have much lower equilibrium moisture content than organic material like wood and leather. typically a fraction of a percent by weight when in equilibrium of air of Relative humidity 10% to 90%. This affects the rate that buildings need to dry out after construction, typical cements starting with 40-60% water content. This is also important for construction materials such as render reinforced with organic materials, as modest changes in content of different types of straw and wood shavings have a significant influence on the overall moisture content

== Bibliography ==
- Hoadley, R. Bruce (2000). Understanding Wood: A Craftsman's Guide to Wood Technology (2nd. ed.). Taunton Press. ISBN 1-56158-358-8.
- Robert J. Ross, ed. (2010). Wood Handbook: Wood as an Engineering Material (PDF). US Forest Products Laboratory. pp. 4-3 – 4-4. General Technical Report FPL–GTR–190. Archived from the original (PDF) on 2017-02-13.
