= Banknotes of the Constantinople Estate (Johore) =

The banknotes of the Constantinople Estate were the only banknotes that were ever issued for circulation on the estates of Tuan Syed Mohamed bin Ahmed Alsagoff with permission of the Johorean Government. They were printed by the Al Sa'aidi Press in Singapore. The extant notes, which are extremely rare, have hand-written signatures and stamped serial numbers. They are printed on only one side. They bear the date of 1 May 1878.

They have never been listed in the Standard Catalog of World Paper Money.

== Catalogue ==
- JPP1. 25 cents. Green. (126 x 113 mm).
- JPP2. 50 cents. Red-brown. (134 x 110 mm).
- JPP3. 1 dollar. Black. (127 x 106 mm).
- JPP4. 2 dollars. Brown. (134 x 106 mm).
