= Coins (magazine) =

American monthly numismatic publication

- Cover of the January 2019 issue of Coins
- Type: Monthly special-interest magazine
- Format: Magazine
- Owner: Active Interest Media
- Publisher: Corinne Zielke
- Editor: Sophia Mattimiro
- Graphic Designer: Danielle Lowery
- Founded: 1955
- Ceased publication: June 2023; 2 years ago
- Language: English
- Headquarters: Des Moines, Iowa
- Country: USA

Coins (formerly Coins: The Magazine of Coin Collecting) was an American monthly numismatic publication.

== History ==
Coins magazine was founded by Chester Krause in 1955 and was called Coin Press. Originally published in Iola, Wisconsin, by Krause Publications from 1955-2002, it was absorbed into F+W, which published the magazine from 2002-2019. In September 2019 it was acquired by Active Interest Media. Then the magazine became part of Active Interest Media's Home Group, based in Des Moines, Iowa.

Along with COINage, it was one of the top numismatic magazines by circulation, with 100,000 subscribers as of October 2009.

In May 2023, it was announced that Coins would cease publication effective with the June 2023 issue, bringing an end to its run.

== Content ==
Each issue featured articles related to coin and paper money collecting, numismatics, investing, the history of the hobby and of coins in general, as well as tips on collecting and a “coin finds” column, where readers could write to discuss any interesting coins found in circulation. In addition, the magazine featured several pages of coin values for coins of obsolete denominations such as the half cent, to modern coinage, as well as commemorative coins and proof sets. R.W. Julian was a regular contributor.

Each month, the magazine focused on specific coins or series, such as Barber coinage, or the Susan B. Anthony dollar. In addition, it occasionally featured reviews of recent numismatic books, and a “market watch” column that tracked bullion values.

=== Regular Columns ===
In addition to the monthly feature stories, each issue contained regular columns, including:

- Coin Finds — In which readers can write or email to talk about Coins they have recently found in circulation.
- Market Watch — Tracking the values of bullion such as gold, silver, and platinum.
- Basics and Beyond — A column focusing on Dr. Mike Thorne's recent pickups and show experiences, as well as occasional reviews of numismatic books.
- Grading Standards — A coin grading column.
- Bargain Collector — Focusing on some of the best "bang for your buck" coins in the hobby.

== Distribution Channels ==
Coins was carried by Barnes & Noble in their periodical section.
