= Wood drying =

Reduction of the moisture content of wood prior to its use

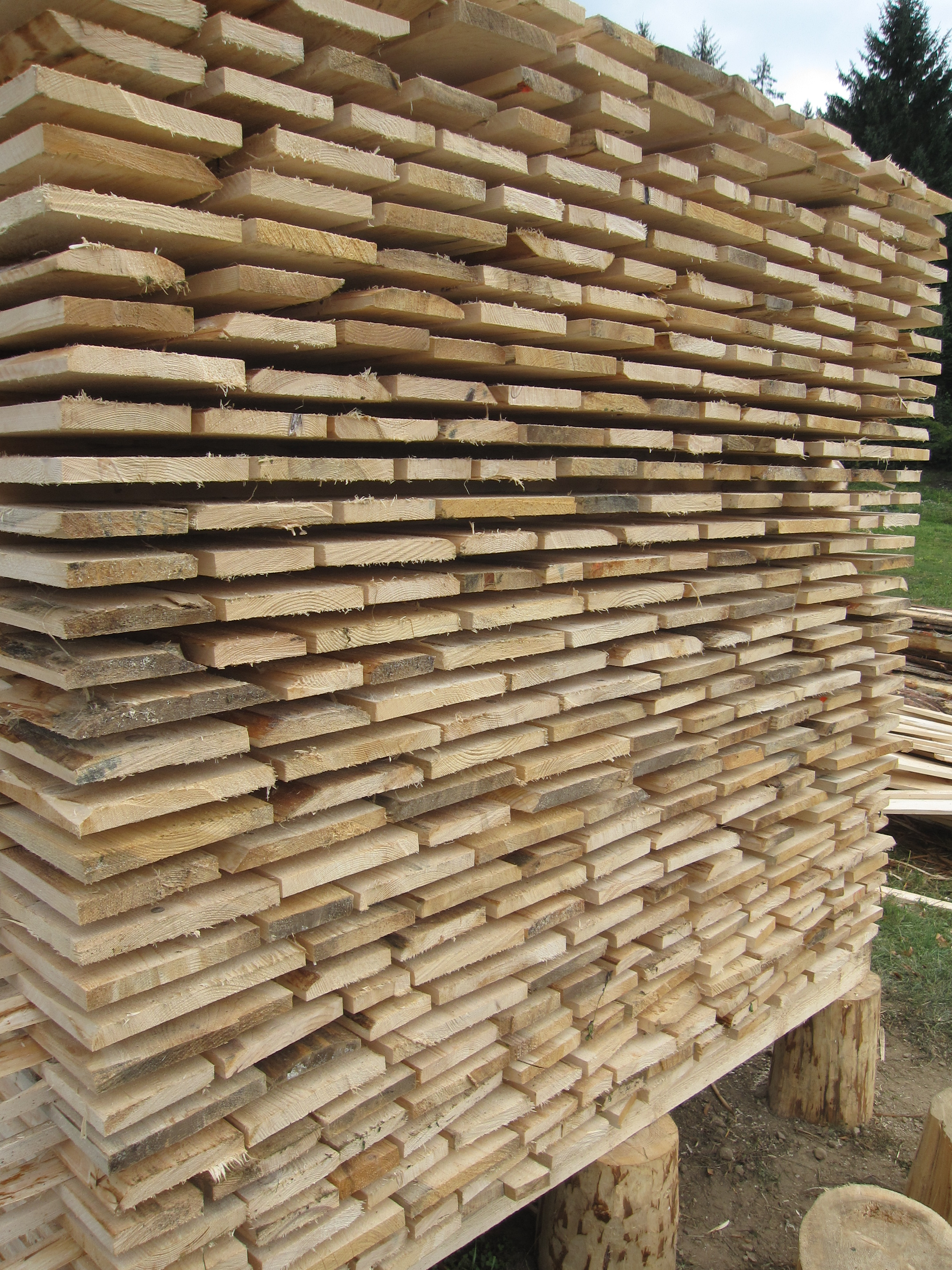
Air-drying timber stack

Wood drying (also seasoning lumber or wood seasoning) reduces the moisture content of wood before its use. When the drying is done in a kiln, the product is known as kiln-dried timber or lumber, whereas air drying is the more traditional method.

There are two uses for wood that require its drying:

Woodworking
When wood is used as a construction material, whether as a structural support in a building or in woodworking objects, it will absorb or expel moisture until it is in equilibrium with its surroundings. Equilibration (usually drying) causes unequal shrinkage in the wood, and can cause damage to the wood if equilibration occurs too rapidly. The equilibration must be controlled to prevent damage to the wood.
Wood burning
When wood is burned (firewood), it is best to dry it first. Damage from shrinkage is not a problem here, as it may be in the case of drying for woodworking purposes. Moisture affects the burning process, with unburnt hydrocarbons going up the chimney. If a 50% wet log is burnt at high temperature, with good heat extraction from the exhaust gas leading to a 100°C exhaust temperature, about 5% of the energy of the log is wasted through evaporating and heating the water vapour. With condensers, the efficiency can be further increased; but, for the normal stove, the key to burning wet wood is to burn it very hot, perhaps starting fire with dry wood.

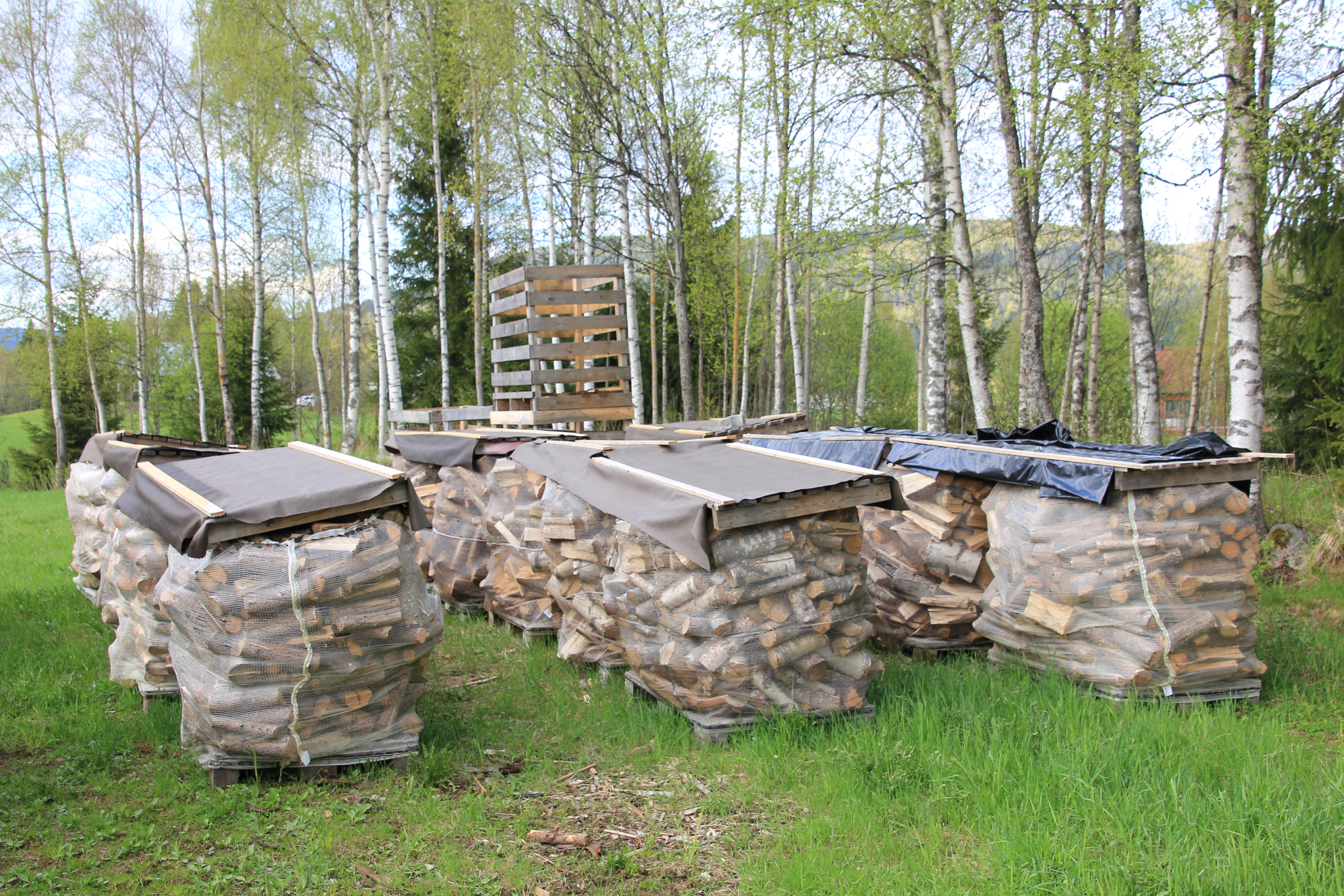
Small firewood logs drying on-site

For some purposes, wood is not dried at all, and is used green. Often, wood must be in equilibrium with the air outside, as for construction wood, or the air indoors, as for wooden furniture.

Typically, wood is sawn before drying in preparation for lumber. Usually the log is dried whole, or split when used for firewood.

Case hardening describes lumber or timber that has been dried too rapidly. Wood initially dries from the shell (surface), shrinking the shell and putting the core under compression. When this shell has a low moisture content, it will 'set' and resist shrinkage. The core of the wood still has a higher moisture content. This core will then begin to dry and shrink. However, any shrinkage is resisted by the already 'set' shell. This leads to reversed stresses; compression stresses on the shell and tension stresses in the core. This results in unrelieved stress called case hardening. Case-hardened wood may exhibit significant warping when stresses are released by sawing.

== Types of wood ==
Wood is divided, according to its botanical origin, into two kinds: softwoods, from coniferous trees, and hardwoods, from broad-leaved trees. Softwoods are lighter and generally simple in structure, whereas hardwoods are harder and more complex. However, in Australia, softwood generally describes rain forest trees, and hardwood describes Sclerophyll species (Eucalyptus spp).

Softwoods such as pine are typically much lighter and easier to dry than hardwoods such as fruit tree wood. The density of softwoods ranges from 350 kg/m^{3} to 700 kg/m^{3}, while hardwoods are 450 kg/m^{3} to 1250 kg/m^{3}. Once dried, both consist of approximately 12% of moisture (Desch and Dinwoodie, 1996). Because of hardwood's denser and more complex structure, its permeability is much less than that of softwood, making it more difficult to dry. Although there are about a hundred times more species of hardwood trees than softwood trees, the ability to be dried and processed faster and more easily makes softwood the main supply of commercial wood nowadays.

== Wood–water relationships ==
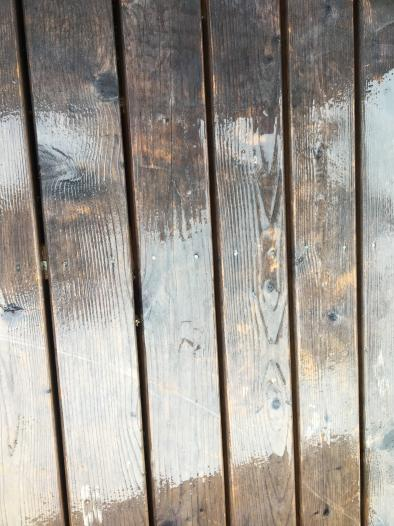
Wood after being coated with a layer of water, with reflectivity similar to a puddle.

The timber of living trees and fresh logs contains a large amount of water which often constitutes over 50% of the wood's weight. Water has a significant influence on wood. Wood continually exchanges moisture or water with its surroundings, although the rate of exchange is strongly affected by the degree to which wood is sealed.

Wood contains water in three forms:

Free water
The bulk of water contained in the cell lumina is only held by capillary forces. It is not bound chemically and is called free water. Free water is not in the same thermodynamic state as liquid water: energy is required to overcome the capillary forces. Furthermore, free water may contain chemicals, altering the drying characteristics of wood.
Bound or hygroscopic water
Bound water is bound to the wood via hydrogen bonds. The attraction of wood for water arises from the presence of free hydroxyl (OH) groups in the cellulose, hemicelluloses and lignin molecules in the cell wall. The hydroxyl groups are negatively charged. Because water is a polar liquid, the free hydroxyl groups in cellulose attract and hold water by hydrogen bonding.
Vapor
Water in cell lumina in the form of water vapour is normally negligible at normal temperature and humidity.

=== Moisture content ===
The moisture content of wood is calculated as the mass change as a proportion of the dry mass, by the formula:

$$\text{moisture content} = \frac{m_\text{g} - m_\text{od}}{m_\text{od}} \times 100\%$$

Here, $m_\text{g}$ is the green mass of the wood, $m_\text{od}$ is its oven dry mass (the attainment of constant mass generally after drying in an oven set at 103±2 °C (218±4 °F) for 24 hours as mentioned by Walker et al., 1993). The equation can also be expressed as a fraction of the mass of the water and the mass of the oven dry wood rather than a percentage. For example, 0.59 kg/kg (oven dry basis) expresses the same moisture content as 59% (oven dry basis).

=== Fibre saturation point ===
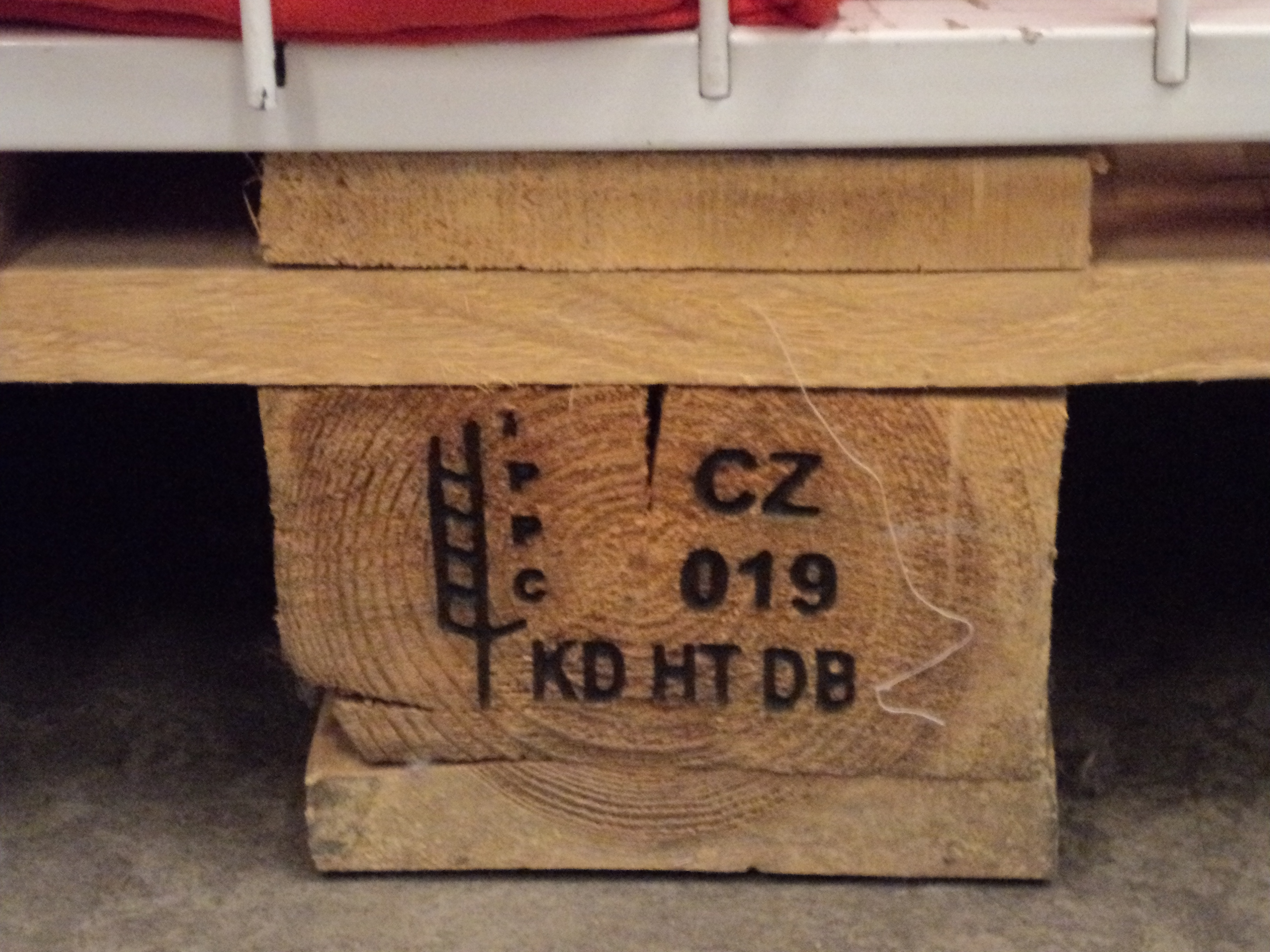
These IPPC markings on a wood pallet indicate KD: kiln-dried, HT: heat treated, and DB: debarked. Essentially all wood packaging material that is exported to an IPPC member state must have a stamp such as this.

When green wood dries, free water from the cell lumina, held by the capillary forces only, is the first to go. Physical properties, such as strength and shrinkage, are generally not affected by the removal of free water. The fibre saturation point (FSP) is defined as the moisture content at which free water should be completely gone, while the cell walls are saturated with bound water. In most types of woods, the fibre saturation point is at 25 to 30% moisture content. Siau (1984) reported that the fibre saturation point $X_\text{fsp}$ (kg/kg) is dependent on the temperature T (°C) according to the following equation:

$X_\text{fsp} = 0.30 - (T - 20C)/1000K \;$ (1.2)

Keey et al. (2000) use a different definition of the fibre saturation point (equilibrium moisture content of wood in an environment of 99% relative humidity).

Many properties of wood show considerable change as the wood is dried below the fibre saturation point, including:

1. volume (ideally no shrinkage occurs until some bound water is lost, that is, until wood is dried below FSP);
2. strength (strengths generally increase consistently as the wood is dried below the FSP, except for impact-bending strength and, in some cases, toughness);
3. electrical resistivity, which increases very rapidly with the loss of bound water when the wood dries below the FSP.

=== Equilibrium moisture content ===
Wood is a hygroscopic substance. It has the ability to take in or give off moisture in the form of vapour. Water contained in wood exerts vapour pressure of its own, which is determined by the maximum size of the capillaries filled with water at any time. If water vapour pressure in the ambient space is lower than vapour pressure within wood, desorption takes place. The largest-sized capillaries, which are full of water at the time, empty first. Vapour pressure within the wood falls as water is successively contained in smaller capillaries. A stage is eventually reached when vapour pressure within the wood equals vapour pressure in the ambient space above the wood, and further desorption ceases. The amount of moisture that remains in the wood at this stage is in equilibrium with water vapour pressure in the ambient space, and is termed the equilibrium moisture content or EMC (Siau, 1984). Because of its hygroscopicity, wood tends to reach a moisture content that is in equilibrium with the relative humidity and temperature of the surrounding air.

Equilibrium moisture content in wood.

The EMC of wood varies with the ambient relative humidity (a function of temperature) significantly, to a lesser degree with the temperature. Siau (1984) reported that the EMC also varies very slightly with species, mechanical stress, drying history of wood, density, extractives content and the direction of sorption in which the moisture change takes place (i.e. adsorption or desorption).

=== Moisture content of wood in service ===
Wood retains its hygroscopic characteristics after it is put into use. It is then subjected to fluctuating humidity, the dominant factor in determining its EMC. These fluctuations may be more or less cyclical, such as diurnal changes or annual seasonal changes.

To minimize the changes in wood moisture content or the movement of wooden objects in service, wood is usually dried to a moisture content that is close to the average EMC conditions to which it will be exposed. These conditions vary for interior uses compared with exterior uses in a given geographic location. For example, according to the Australian Standard for Timber Drying Quality (AS/NZS 4787, 2001), the EMC is recommended to be 10–12% for the majority of Australian states, although extreme cases are up to 15 to 18% for some places in Queensland, Northern Territory, Western Australia and Tasmania. However, the EMC is as low as 6 to 7% in dry centrally heated houses and offices or in permanently air-conditioned buildings.

=== Shrinkage and swelling ===
Shrinkage and swelling may occur in wood when the moisture content is changed. Shrinkage occurs as moisture content decreases, while swelling takes place when it increases. Volume change is not equal in all directions. The greatest dimensional change occurs in a direction tangential to the growth rings. Shrinkage from the pith outwards, or radially, is usually considerably less than tangential shrinkage, while longitudinal (along the grain) shrinkage is so slight as to be usually neglected. The longitudinal shrinkage is 0.1% to 0.3%, in contrast to transverse shrinkages, which is 2% to 10%. Tangential shrinkage is often about twice as great as in the radial direction, although in some species it is as much as five times as great. The shrinkage is about 5% to 10% in the tangential direction and about 2% to 6% in the radial direction.

Differential transverse shrinkage of wood is related to:

1. the alternation of late wood and early wood increments within the annual ring;
2. the influence of wood rays on the radial direction;
3. the features of the cell wall structure such as microfibril angle modifications and pits;
4. the chemical composition of the middle lamella.

Wood drying may be described as the art of ensuring that gross dimensional changes through shrinkage are confined to the drying process. Ideally, wood is dried to that equilibrium moisture content as will later (in service) be attained by the wood. Thus, further dimensional change will be kept to a minimum.

It is probably impossible to completely eliminate dimensional change in wood, but elimination of change in size may be approximated by chemical modification. For example, wood can be treated with chemicals to replace the hydroxyl groups with other hydrophobic functional groups of modifying agents. Among all the existing processes, wood modification with acetic anhydride has been noted for the high anti-shrink or anti-swell efficiency (ASE) attainable without damage to wood. However, acetylation of wood has been slow to be commercialised due to the cost, corrosion and the entrapment of the acetic acid in wood. There is an extensive volume of literature relating to the chemical modification of wood.

Drying timber is one method of adding value to sawn products from the primary wood processing industries. According to the Australian Forest and Wood Products Research and Development Corporation (FWPRDC), green sawn hardwood, which is sold at about $350 per cubic metre or less, increases in value to $2,000 per cubic metre or more with drying and processing. However, currently used conventional drying processes often result in significant quality problems from cracks, both externally and internally, reducing the value of the product. For example, in Queensland (Anon, 1997), on the assumption that 10% of the dried softwood is devalued by $200 per cubic metre because of drying defects, saw millers are losing about $5 million a year. In Australia, the loss could be $40 million a year for softwood and an equal or higher amount for hardwood. Thus, proper drying under controlled conditions prior to use is of great importance in timber use, in countries where climatic conditions vary considerably at different times of the year.

Drying, if carried out promptly after felling of trees, also protects timber against primary decay, fungal stain and attack by certain kinds of insects. Organisms, which cause decay and stain, generally cannot thrive in timber with a moisture content below 20%. Several, though not all, insect pests can live only in green timber.

In addition to the above advantages of drying timber, the following points are also significant:

1. Dried timber is lighter, and the transportation and handling costs are reduced.
2. Dried timber is stronger than green timber in most strength properties.
3. Timbers for impregnation with preservatives have to be properly dried if proper penetration is to be accomplished, particularly in the case of oil-type preservatives.
4. In the field of chemical modification of wood and wood products, the material should be dried to a certain moisture content for the appropriate reactions to occur.
5. Dry wood generally works, machines, finishes and glues better than green timber (although there are exceptions; for instance, green wood is often easier to turn than dry wood). Paints and finishes last longer on dry timber.
6. The electrical and thermal insulation properties of wood are improved by drying.

Prompt drying of wood immediately after felling therefore significantly upgrades and adds value to raw timber. Drying enables substantial long-term economy by rationalizing the use of timber resources. The drying of wood is thus an area for research and development, which concern many researchers and timber companies around the world.

=== Mechanisms of moisture movement ===
Water in wood normally moves from zones of higher to zones of lower moisture content. Drying starts from the exterior of the wood and moves towards the centre, and drying at the outside is also necessary to expel moisture from the inner zones of the wood. Wood subsequently attains equilibrium with the surrounding air in moisture content.

==== Moisture passageways ====
The driving force of moisture movement is chemical potential. However, it is not always easy to relate chemical potential in wood to commonly observable variables, such as temperature and moisture content. Moisture in wood moves within the wood as liquid or vapour through several types of passageways, based on the nature of the driving force, (e.g. pressure or moisture gradient), and variations in wood structure, as explained in the next section on driving forces for moisture movement. These pathways consist of cavities of the vessels, fibres, ray cells, pit chambers and their pit membrane openings, intercellular spaces and transitory cell wall passageways.

Movement of water takes place in these passageways in any direction, longitudinally in the cells, as well as laterally from cell to cell until it reaches the lateral drying surfaces of the wood. The higher longitudinal permeability of sapwood of hardwood is generally caused by the presence of vessels. The lateral permeability and transverse flow is often very low in hardwoods. The vessels in hardwoods are sometimes blocked by the presence of tyloses and/or by secreting gums and resins in some other species, as mentioned earlier. The presence of gum veins, the formation of which is often a result of natural protective response of trees to injury, is commonly observed on the surface of sawn boards of most eucalypts. Despite the generally higher volume fraction of rays in hardwoods (typically 15% of wood volume), the rays are not particularly effective in radial flow, nor are the pits on the radial surfaces of fibres effective in tangential flow.

==== Moisture movement space ====
The available space for air and moisture in wood depends on the density and porosity of wood. Porosity is the volume fraction of void space in a solid. The porosity is reported to be 1.2 to 4.6% of dry volume of wood cell wall. On the other hand, permeability is a measure of the ease with which fluids are transported through a porous solid under the influence of some driving forces, e.g. capillary pressure gradient or moisture gradient. It is clear that solids must be porous to be permeable, but it does not necessarily follow that all porous bodies are permeable. Permeability can only exist if the void spaces are interconnected by openings. For example, a hardwood may be permeable because there is intervessel pitting with openings in the membranes. If these membranes are occluded or encrusted, or if the pits are aspirated, the wood assumes a closed-cell structure and may be virtually impermeable. The density is also important for impermeable hardwoods because more cell-wall material is traversed per unit distance, which offers increased resistance to diffusion. Hence lighter woods, in general, dry more rapidly than do the heavier woods. The transport of fluids is often bulk flow (momentum transfer) for permeable softwoods at high temperature while diffusion occurs for impermeable hardwoods. These mechanisms are discussed below.

=== Driving forces for moisture movement ===
Three main driving forces used in different version of diffusion models are moisture content, the partial pressure of water vapour, and the chemical potential of water. These are discussed here, including capillary action, which is a mechanism for free water transport in permeable softwoods. Total pressure difference is the driving force during wood vacuum drying.

==== Capillary action ====
Capillary forces determine the movements (or absence of movement) of free water. It is due to both adhesion and cohesion. Adhesion is the attraction between water to other substances and cohesion is the attraction of the molecules in water to each other.

As wood dries, evaporation of water from the surface sets up capillary forces that exert a pull on the free water in the zones of wood beneath the surfaces. When there is no longer any free water in the wood capillary forces are no longer of importance.

==== Moisture content differences ====
The chemical potential is explained here since it is the true driving force for the transport of water in both liquid and vapour phases in wood. The Gibbs free energy per mole of substance is usually expressed as the chemical potential of that substance. The chemical potential of water in unsaturated air or wood below the fibre saturation point influences the drying of wood. Equilibrium will occur at the equilibrium moisture content (as defined earlier) of wood when the chemical potential of water in the wood becomes equal to that in the surrounding air. The chemical potential of sorbed water is a function of wood moisture content. Therefore, a gradient of wood moisture content (between surface and centre), or more specifically of water activity, is accompanied by a gradient of chemical potential under isothermal conditions. Moisture will redistribute itself throughout the wood until its chemical potential is uniform throughout, resulting in a zero potential gradient at equilibrium. The flux of moisture attempting to achieve the equilibrium state is assumed to be proportional to the difference in its chemical potential, and inversely proportional to the path length over which the potential difference acts.

The gradient in chemical potential is related to the moisture content gradient as explained in above equations. The diffusion model using the moisture content gradient as a driving force was applied successfully by Wu (1989) and Doe et al. (1994). Though the agreement between the moisture-content profiles predicted by the diffusion model based on moisture-content gradients is better at lower moisture contents than at higher ones, there is no evidence to suggest that there are significantly different moisture-transport mechanisms operating at higher moisture contents for this timber. Their observations are consistent with a transport process that is driven by the total concentration of water. The diffusion model is used here based on this empirical evidence that the moisture-content gradient is a driving force for drying this type of impermeable timber.

Differences in moisture content between the surface and the centre (gradient, the chemical potential difference between interface and bulk) move the bound water through the small passageways in the cell wall by diffusion. In comparison with capillary movement, diffusion is a slow process. Diffusion is the generally suggested mechanism for the drying of impermeable hardwoods. Furthermore, moisture migrates slowly due to the fact that extractives plug the small cell wall openings in the heartwood. This is why sapwood generally dries faster than heartwood under the same drying conditions.

==== Moisture movement directions for diffusion ====
It is reported that the ratio of the longitudinal to the transverse (radial and tangential) diffusion rates for wood ranges from about 100 at a moisture content of 5%, to 2–4 at a moisture content of 25%. Radial diffusion is somewhat faster than tangential diffusion. Although longitudinal diffusion is most rapid, it is of practical importance only when short pieces are dried. Generally the timber boards are much longer than in width or thickness. For example, a typical size of a green board used for this research was 6 m long, 250 mm in width and 43 mm in thickness. If the boards are quartersawn, then the width will be in the radial direction whereas the thickness will be in tangential direction, and vice versa for plain-sawn boards. Most of the moisture is removed from wood by lateral movement during drying.

=== Reasons for splits and cracks during timber drying and their control ===
The chief difficulty experienced in the drying of timber is the tendency of its outer layers to dry out more rapidly than the interior ones. If these layers are allowed to dry much below the fibre saturation point while the interior is still saturated, stresses (called drying stresses) are set up because the shrinkage of the outer layers is restricted by the wet interior. Rupture in the wood tissues occurs, and consequently splits and cracks occur if these stresses across the grain exceed the strength across the grain (fibre to fibre bonding).

The successful control of drying defects in a drying process consists in maintaining a balance between the rate of evaporation of moisture from the surface and the rate of outward movement of moisture from the interior of the wood. The way in which drying can be controlled will now be explained. One of the most successful ways of wood drying or seasoning would be kiln drying, where the wood is placed into a kiln compartment in stacks and dried by steaming, and releasing the steam slowly.

=== Influence of temperature, relative humidity and rate of air circulation ===
The external drying conditions (temperature, relative humidity and air velocity) control the external boundary conditions for drying, and hence the drying rate, as well as affecting the rate of internal moisture movement. The drying rate is affected by external drying conditions, as will now be described.

Temperature
If the relative humidity is kept constant, the higher the temperature, the higher the drying rate. Temperature influences the drying rate by increasing the moisture holding capacity of the air, as well as by accelerating the diffusion rate of moisture through the wood.
The actual temperature in a drying kiln is the dry-bulb temperature (usually denoted by Tg), which is the temperature of a vapour-gas mixture determined by inserting a thermometer with a dry bulb. On the other hand, the wet-bulb temperature (TW) is defined as the temperature reached by a small amount of liquid evaporating in a large amount of an unsaturated air-vapour mixture. The temperature sensing element of this thermometer is kept moist with a porous fabric sleeve (cloth) usually put in a reservoir of clean water. A minimum air flow of 2 m/s is needed to prevent a zone of stagnant damp air formation around the sleeve. Since air passes over the wet sleeve, water is evaporated and cools the wet-bulb thermometer. The difference between the dry-bulb and wet-bulb temperatures, the wet-bulb depression, is used to determine the relative humidity from a standard hygrometric chart. A higher difference between the dry-bulb and wet-bulb temperatures indicates a lower relative humidity. For example, if the dry-bulb temperature is 100 °C and wet-bulb temperature 60 °C, then the relative humidity is read as 17% from a hygrometric chart.
Relative humidity
The relative humidity of air is defined as the partial pressure of water vapour divided by the saturated vapour pressure at the same temperature and total pressure. If the temperature is kept constant, lower relative humidities result in higher drying rates due to the increased moisture gradient in wood, resulting from the reduction of the moisture content in the surface layers when the relative humidity of air is reduced. The relative humidity is usually expressed on a percentage basis. For drying, the other essential parameter related to relative humidity is the absolute humidity, which is the mass of water vapour per unit mass of dry air (kg of water per kg of dry air). However, its influenced by the amount of water in the heated air.
Air circulation rate
Drying time and timber quality depend on the air velocity and its uniform circulation. At a constant temperature and relative humidity, the highest possible drying rate is obtained by rapid circulation of air across the surface of wood, giving rapid removal of moisture evaporating from the wood. However, a higher drying rate is not always desirable, particularly for impermeable hardwoods, because higher drying rates develop greater stresses that may cause the timber to crack or distort. At very low fan speeds, less than 1 m/s, the air flow through the stack is often laminar flow, and the heat transfer between the timber surface and the moving air stream is not particularly effective. The low effectiveness (externally) of heat transfer is not necessarily a problem if internal moisture movement is the key limitation to the movement of moisture, as it is for most hardwoods.

=== Classification of timbers for drying ===
The timbers are classified as follows according to their ease of drying and their proneness to drying degrade:

Highly refractory woods
These woods are slow and difficult to dry if the final product is to be free from defects, particularly cracks and splits. Examples are heavy structural timbers with high density such as ironbark (Eucalyptus paniculata), blackbutt (E. pillularis), southern blue gum (E. globulus) and brush box (Lophostemon cofertus). They require considerable protection and care against rapid drying conditions for the best results.
Moderately refractory woods
These timbers show a moderate tendency to crack and split during seasoning. They can be seasoned free from defects with moderately rapid drying conditions (i.e. a maximum dry-bulb temperature of 85 °C can be used). Examples are Sydney blue gum (E. saligna) and other timbers of medium density, which are potentially suitable for furniture.
Non-refractory woods
These woods can be rapidly seasoned to be free from defects even by applying high temperatures (dry-bulb temperatures of more than 100 °C) in industrial kilns. If not dried rapidly, they may develop discolouration (blue stain) and mould on the surface. Examples are softwoods and low density timbers such as Pinus radiata.

=== Model ===
The rate at which wood dries depends upon a number of factors, the most important of which are the temperature, the dimensions of the wood, and the relative humidity. Simpson and Tschernitz have developed a simple model of wood drying as a function of these three variables. Although the analysis was done for red oak, the procedure may be applied to any species of wood by adjusting the constant parameters of the model.

Simply put, the model assumes that the rate of change of the moisture content M with respect to time t is proportional to how far the wood sample is from its equilibrium moisture content $M_e$, which is a function of the temperature T and relative humidity h:

$$\frac{dM}{dt} = -\frac{M - M_e}{\tau}$$

where $\tau$ is a function of the temperature T and a typical wood dimension L and has units of time. The typical wood dimension is roughly the smallest value of ($L_r,\, L_t,\, L_L/10$) which are the radial, tangential and longitudinal dimensions respectively, in inches, with the longitudinal dimension divided by ten because water diffuses about 10 times more rapidly in the longitudinal direction (along the grain) than in the lateral dimensions. The solution to the above equation is:

$$\frac{M - M_e}{M_0 - M_e} = e^{-\frac{t}{\tau}}$$

Where $M_0$ is the initial moisture content. It was found that for red oak lumber, the "time constant" $\tau$ was well expressed as:

$$\tau = \frac{L^n}{a + bp_\text{sat}(T)}$$

where a, b and n are constants and $p_\text{sat}(T)$ is the saturation vapor pressure of water at temperature T. For time measured in days, length in inches, and $p_\text{sat}$ measured in mmHg, the following values of the constants were found for red oak lumber.

a = 0.0575
b = 0.00142
n = 1.52

Solving for the drying time yields:

$$t = -\tau\,\ln\left(\frac{M - M_e}{M_0 - M_e}\right) = \frac{-L^n}{a + bp_\text{sat}(T)}\,\ln\left(\frac{M - M_e}{M_0 - M_e}\right)$$

For example, at 150 °F, using the Arden Buck equation, the saturation vapor pressure of water is found to be about 192 mmHg (25.6 kPa). The time constant for drying a 1-inch-thick (25 mm) red oak board at 150 °F is then $\tau = 3.03$ days, which is the time required to reduce the moisture content to 1/e = 37% of its initial deviation from equilibrium. If the relative humidity is 0.50, then using the Hailwood-Horrobin equation the moisture content of the wood at equilibrium is about 7.4%. The time to reduce the lumber from 85% moisture content to 25% moisture content is then about 4.5 days. Higher temperatures will yield faster drying times, but they will also create greater stresses in the wood due because the moisture gradient will be larger. For firewood, this is not an issue but for woodworking purposes, high stresses will cause the wood to crack and be unusable. Normal drying times to obtain minimal seasoning checks (cracks) in 25 mm (1 inch or 4/4 lumber) Red Oak ranges from 22 to 30 days, and in 8/4, (50 mm or 2 inch) it will range from 65 to 90 days.

== Methods of drying timber ==
Broadly, there are two methods by which timber can be dried:

- natural drying or air drying
- artificial drying

=== Air drying ===
Air drying is the drying of timber by exposing it to the air. The technique of air drying consists mainly of making a stack of sawn timber (with the layers of boards separated by stickers) on raised foundations, in a clean, cool, dry and shady place. Rate of drying largely depends on climatic conditions, and on the air movement (exposure to the wind). For successful air drying, a continuous and uniform flow of air throughout the pile of the timber needs to be arranged.

The rate of loss of moisture can be controlled by coating the planks with any substance that is relatively impermeable to moisture; ordinary mineral oil is usually quite effective. Coating the ends of logs with oil or thick paint improves their quality upon drying. Wrapping planks or logs in materials which will allow some movement of moisture, generally works very well provided the wood is first treated against fungal infection by coating in petrol/gasoline or oil. Mineral oil will generally not soak in more than 1–2 mm below the surface and is easily removed by planing when the timber is suitably dry.

- Benefits: It can be less expensive to use this drying method (there are still costs associated with storing the wood, and with the slower process of getting the wood to market), and air drying often produces a higher quality, more easily workable wood than with kiln drying.
- Drawbacks: Depending on the climate, it takes several months to a number of years to air-dry the wood.

=== Kiln drying ===
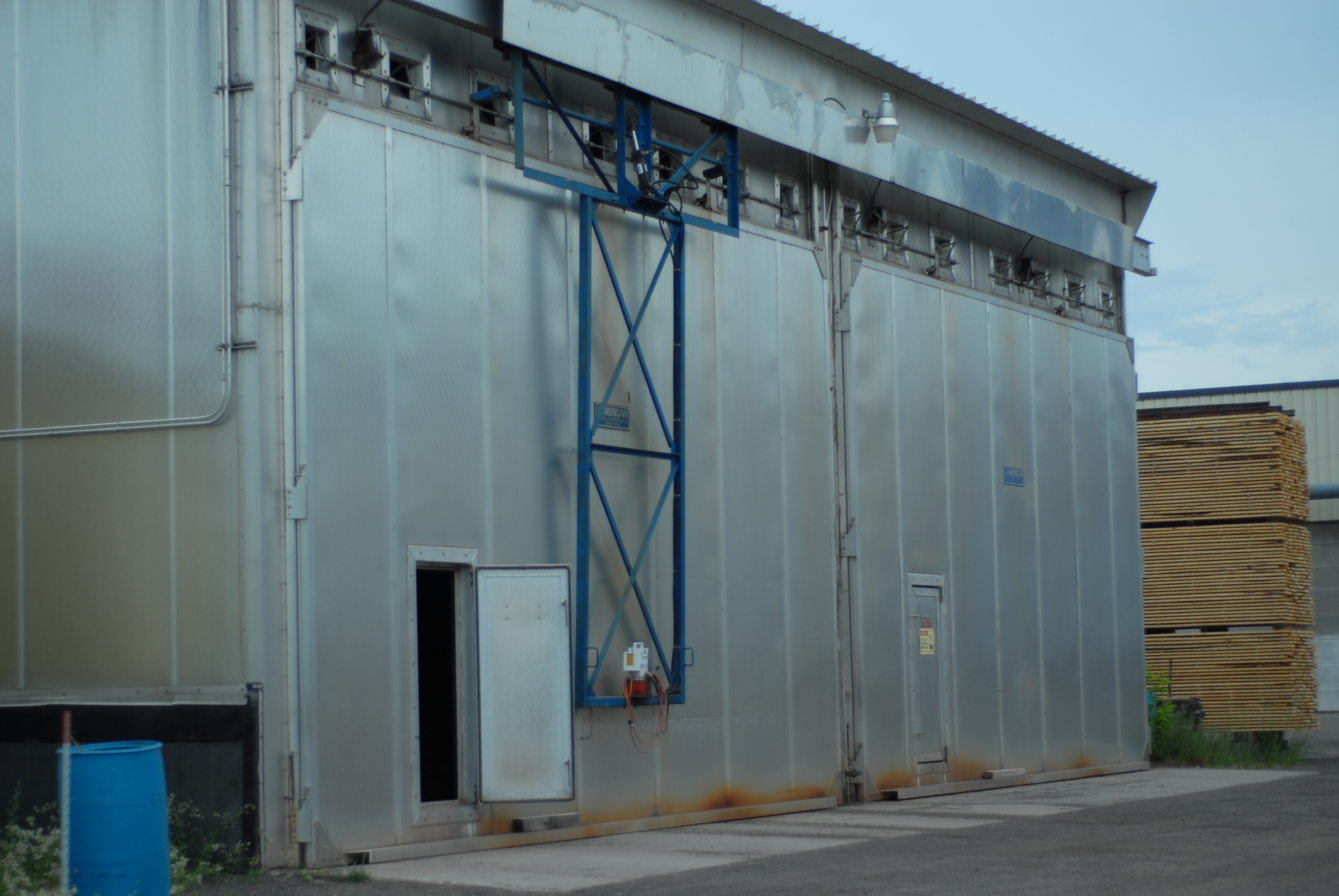
Large wood-drying kiln, used for maple

The process of artificial or 'oven' drying consists basically of introducing heat. This may be achieved directly, using natural gas and/or electricity, or indirectly, through steam-heated heat exchangers. Solar energy is also an option. In the process, deliberate control of temperature, relative humidity and air circulation creates variable conditions to achieve specific drying profiles. To achieve this, the timber is stacked in chambers that are fitted with equipment to control atmospheric temperature, relative humidity and circulation rate.

Chamber drying provides a means of overcoming the limitations imposed by erratic weather conditions. With kiln drying, as is the case with air drying, unsaturated air is used as the drying medium. Almost all commercial timbers of the world are dried in industrial kilns. A comparison of air drying, conventional kiln and solar drying is given below:

1. Timber can be dried to any desired low moisture content by conventional or solar kiln drying, but in air drying, moisture contents of less than 18% are difficult to attain for most locations.
2. The drying times are considerably less in conventional kiln drying than in solar kiln drying, followed by air drying.
  - This means that if capital outlay is involved, this capital sits for a longer time when air drying is used. On the other hand, installing, operating and maintaining an industrial kiln is expensive.
  - In addition, wood that is being air dried takes up space, which could also cost money.
3. In air drying, there is little control over the drying conditions, so drying rates cannot be controlled.
4. The temperatures employed in kiln drying typically kill all the fungi and insects in the wood if a maximum dry-bulb temperature of above 60°C is used for the drying schedule. This is not guaranteed in air drying.
5. If air drying is done improperly (exposed to the sun), the rate of drying may be overly rapid in the dry summer months, causing cracking and splitting, and too slow during the cold winter months.

Significant advantages of conventional kiln drying include higher throughput and better control of the final moisture content. Conventional kilns and solar drying both enable wood to be dried to any moisture content regardless of weather conditions. For most large-scale drying operations solar and conventional kiln drying are more efficient than air drying.

Compartment-type kilns are most commonly used in timber companies. A compartment kiln is filled with a static batch of timber through which air is circulated. In these types of kiln, the timber remains stationary. The drying conditions are successively varied according to the type of timber being dried. This drying method is well suited to the needs of timber companies, which have to dry timbers of varied species and thickness, including refractory hardwoods that are more liable than other species to check and split.

The main elements of chamber drying are:

Construction materials
The chambers are generally built of brick masonry, or hollow cement-concrete slabs. Sheet metal or prefabricated aluminium in a double-walled construction with sandwiched thermal insulation, such as glass wool or polyurethane foams, are materials that are also used in some modern timber ovens. However, brick masonry chambers, with lime and (mortar) plaster on the inside and painted with impermeable coatings, are used widely and have been found to be satisfactory for many applications.
Heating
Heating is usually carried out by steam heat exchangers and pipes of various configurations (e.g. plain, or finned (transverse or longitudinal) tubes) or by large flue pipes through which hot gases from a wood-burning furnace are passed. Only occasionally is electricity or gas employed for heating.
Humidification
Humidification is commonly accomplished by introducing live steam into the kiln through a steam spray pipe. In order to limit and control the humidity of the air when large quantities of moisture are being rapidly evaporated from the timber, there is normally a provision for ventilation of the chamber in all types of kilns.
Air circulation
Air circulation is the means for carrying the heat to and the moisture away from all parts of a load. Forced circulation kilns are most common, where the air is circulated by means of fans or blowers, which may be installed outside the kiln chamber (external fan kiln) or inside it (internal fan kiln).

Throughout the process, it is necessary to keep close control of the moisture content using a moisture meter system in order to reduce over-drying and allow operators to know when to pull the charge. Preferably, this in-kiln moisture meter will have an auto-shutoff feature.

==== Kiln drying schedules ====
Satisfactory kiln drying can usually be accomplished by regulating the temperature and humidity of the circulating air to control the moisture content of the lumber at any given time. This condition is achieved by applying kiln-drying schedules. The desired objective of an appropriate schedule is to ensure drying lumber at the fastest possible rate without causing objectionable degrade. The following factors have a considerable bearing on the schedules.

The species
Variations in anatomical, physical, and mechanical properties between species affect drying times and overall results.
The thickness of the lumber
Drying time is inversely related to thickness and, to some extent, the width of the lumber.
Whether the lumber boards are quarter-sawn, flat-sawn, or bastard-sawn (mixed-sawn)
Sawing pattern influences the distortion due to shrinkage anisotropy.
Permissible drying degrade
Aggressive drying schedules can cause timber to crack and distort.
Intended use of timber
Mechanical and aesthetic requirements will necessitate different moisture targets depending on the intended use.

Considering each of the factors, no one schedule is necessarily appropriate, even for similar loads of the same species. This is why there is so much timber drying research focused on the development of effective drying schedules.

=== Dehumidification kiln ===
A dehumidification chamber can be an unvented system (closed loop) or a partially vented system which uses a heat pump to condense moisture from the air using the cold side of the refrigeration process (evaporator.) The heat thus gathered is sent to the hot side of the refrigeration process (condenser) to re-heat the air and returns this drier and warmer air inside the kiln. Fans blow the air through the piles as in a normal kiln. These kilns traditionally operate from 100 °F to 160 °F and use about half the energy of a conventional kiln.

=== Vacuum kiln ===
These kilns can be the fastest to dry and most efficient with energy usage. In a vacuum, water boils at a lower temperature. In addition to increased speed, a vacuum kiln can also produce an improved quality in the wood.

Low ambient pressure does lower the boiling point of water but the amount of energy required to convert the liquid to vapor is the same. Savings come from not being required to heat a huge building and not being required to vent the heat while lowering humidity.

Since all free water can be removed at below 115 °F, quality is improved.

While conventional drying uses warm, dry air to skim water off the surface, vacuum kilns can boil water from within the wood. This enables a good vacuum kiln to dry very thick wood very quickly. It is possible to dry 12/4 Red Oak fresh off the saw to 7% in 11 days.

Since wood is dried with a vapor gradient - vapor pressure to ambient pressure - humidity can be kept very high. Because of this, a good vacuum kiln can dry 4.5" thick White Oak fresh off the saw to 8% in less than a month, a feat that was previously thought to be impossible.

=== Solar kiln ===
A solar kiln is a cross between kiln drying and air drying. These kilns are a greenhouse with high-temperature fans and either vents or a condensing system. Solar kilns are slower and variable due to the weather, but are low cost. They use no grid electricity.

=== Water seasoning ===
Water seasoning is the process of immersing wood in running water, quickly removing sap, followed by air drying. It can reduce the elasticity and durability of the wood and cause it to become brittle. There are competing perspectives, however, such as Thomas Tredgold's assertion that "...timber for the joiner's use is best put in water for some time, and afterwards dried; as it renders the timber less liable to warp and crack in drying. Where strength is required it ought not to be put in water."

=== Boiling or steam seasoning ===
Submersion in boiling water or the application of steam speeds the drying of wood. This method is said to cause less shrinkage, "… but it is expensive to use, and reduces the strength and elasticity of the timber."

=== Chemical or salt seasoning ===
Salt seasoning is the submersion of wood in a solution of urea, sodium nitrate, all of which act as dehydrating agents. The wood is then air dried.

=== Electrical seasoning ===
Electrical seasoning involves running an electric current through the lumber causing heat to be generated and drying the wood. This method is expensive but is fast and uniform quality.

=== Freeze drying ===
Freeze drying is accomplished by lowering the pressure in a chamber containing the wood to a few millibars, while lowering the temperature of the chamber to below the eutectic point of the material. Heat is typically added slowly to the material to allow the water contained in the wood to sublimate directly into vapor, and be deposited on the sides of the vacuum chamber or in the cold trap through which the chamber is evacuated. Freeze drying through sublimation typically takes about 10 times the energy that is taken through evaporation of water by heat. In practice, freeze drying of wood can be accomplished by placing room temperature wood in a vacuum chamber that can be chilled to -30 degrees C or lower, evacuating the chamber to a few millibars, and at the same time cooling the chamber to a freezing temperature. The latent heat of the ice in the wood will come out through the water vapor, which will condense as ice on the inside of the chamber. After a few hours under vacuum and freezing conditions, the chamber is returned to normal pressure, the wood removed and bagged in plastic to keep water from condensing on it, and allowed to return to room temperature over a few hours to a day. The cycle is then repeated, each time the latent heat in the wood is removed through the water content in the wood sublimating and/or evaporating and condensing on the sides of the container and in the cold trap. The cycles are repeated until the moisture content of the wood is at a pre-determined acceptable level. Instead of cycling the wood in the chamber, heat can be added to the wood at a rate that matches the rate of sublimation of ice in the wood to water vapor, which is deposited on the inside of the chamber or in the cold trap. An advantage of freeze drying wood is that the form of the wood is maintained, and shrinkage does not typically occur. Shrinkage will occur over time after the wood is freeze dried, but this typically will not cause defects in the wood.

== Drying defects ==
Drying defects are the most common form of degrade in timber, next to natural problems such as knots. There are two types of drying defects, although some defects involve both causes:

1. Defects from shrinkage anisotropy, resulting in warping: cupping, bowing, twisting, crooking, spring and diamonding.
2. Defects from uneven drying, resulting in the rupture of the wood tissue, such as checks (surface, end and internal), end splits, honey-combing and case hardening. Collapse, often shown as corrugation, or so-called washboarding of the wood surface, may also occur (Innes, 1996). Collapse is a defect that results from the physical flattening of fibres to above the fibre saturation point and is thus not a form of shrinkage anisotropy.

The standard organizations in Australia and New Zealand (AS/NZS 4787, 2001) have developed a standard for timber quality. The five measures of drying quality include:

1. moisture content gradient and presence of residual drying stress (case-hardening);
2. surface, internal and end checks;
3. collapse;
4. distortions;
5. discolouration caused by drying.

== Wood-drying kiln ==
A variety of wood drying kiln technologies exist today: conventional, dehumidification, solar, vacuum and radio frequency.

Conventional wood dry kilns (Rasmussen, 1988) are either package-type (sideloader) or track-type (tram) construction. Most hardwood lumber kilns are sideloader kilns in which fork trucks are used to load lumber packages into the kiln. Most softwood lumber kilns are track types in which lumber packages are loaded on kiln/track cars for loading the kiln.

Modern high-temperature, high-air-velocity conventional kilns can typically dry 1-inch-thick (25 mm) green lumber in 10 hours down to a moisture content of 18%. However, 1-inch-thick green Red Oak requires about 28 days to dry down to a moisture content of 8%.

Heat is typically introduced via steam running through fin/tube heat exchangers controlled by on/off pneumatic valves. Less common are proportional pneumatic valves or even various electrical actuators. Humidity is removed via a system of vents, the specific layout of which are usually particular to a given manufacturer. In general, cool dry air is introduced at one end of the kiln while warm moist air is expelled at the other. Hardwood conventional kilns also require the introduction of humidity via either steam spray or cold water misting systems to keep the relative humidity inside the kiln from dropping too low during the drying cycle. Fan directions are typically reversed periodically to ensure even drying of larger kiln charges.

Most softwood lumber kilns operate below 115 °C (239 °F) temperature. Hardwood lumber kiln drying schedules typically keep the dry bulb temperature below 80 °C (176 °F). Difficult-to-dry species might not exceed 60 °C (140 °F).

Dehumidification kilns are very similar to conventional kilns in basic construction. Drying times are usually comparable. Heat is primarily supplied by an integral dehumidification unit which also serves to remove humidity. Auxiliary heat is often provided early in the schedule where the heat required may exceed the heat generated by the DH unit.

Solar kilns are conventional kilns, typically built by hobbyists to keep initial investment costs low. Heat is provided via solar radiation, while internal air circulation is typically passive.

In 1949 a Chicago company introduced a wood drying kiln that used infrared lamps that they claimed reduced the standard drying time from 14 days to 45 minutes.

Newer wood drying technologies have included the use of reduced atmospheric pressure to attempt to speed up the drying process. A variety of vacuum technologies exist, varying primarily in the method heat is introduced into the wood charge. Hot water platten vacuum kilns use aluminum heating plates with the water circulating within as the heat source, and typically operate at significantly reduced absolute pressure. Discontinuous and SSV (super-heated steam) use atmosphere to introduce heat into the kiln charge. Discontinuous technology allows the entire kiln charge to come up to full atmospheric pressure, the air in the chamber is then heated, and finally vacuum is pulled. SSV run at partial atmospheres (typically around 1/3 of full atmospheric pressure) in a hybrid of vacuum and conventional kiln technology (SSV kilns are significantly more popular in Europe where the locally harvested wood is easier to dry versus species found in North America). RF/V (radio frequency + vacuum) kilns use microwave radiation to heat the kiln charge, and typically have the highest operating cost due to the heat of vaporization being provided by electricity rather than local fossil fuel or waste wood sources.

Valid economic studies of different wood drying technologies are based on the total energy, capital, insurance/risk, environmental impacts, labor, maintenance, and product degrade costs for the task of removing water from the wood fiber. These costs (which can be a significant part of the entire plant costs) involve the differential impact of the presence of drying equipment in a specific plant. An example of this is that every piece of equipment (in a lumber manufacturing plant) from the green trimmer to the infeed system at the planer mill is the "drying system". Since thousands of different types of wood products manufacturing plants exist around the globe, and may be integrated (lumber, plywood, paper, etc.) or stand alone (lumber only), the true costs of the drying system can only be determined when comparing the total plant costs and risks with and without drying.

The total (harmful) air emissions produced by wood kilns, including their heat source, can be significant. Typically, the higher the temperature the kiln operates at, the larger amount of emissions are produced (per pound of water removed). This is especially true in the drying of thin veneers and high-temperature drying of softwoods.

== OSHA Standards regarding Dry Kiln Facilities ==
1910.265(f)(3)(i)(a): Main kiln doors shall be provided with a method of holding them open while kiln is being loaded.

1910.265(f)(3)(i)(b): Counterweights on vertical lift doors shall be boxed or otherwise guarded.

1910.265(f)(3)(i)(c): Adequate means shall be provided to firmly secure main doors, when they are disengaged from carriers and hangers, to prevent toppling.

1910.265(f)(3)(ii)(a): If operating procedures require access to kilns, kilns shall be provided with escape doors that operate easily from the inside, swing in the direction of exit, and are located in or near the main door at the end of the passageway.

1910.265(f)(3)(ii)(b): Escape doors shall be of adequate height and width to accommodate an average size man.

1910.265(f)(4): Pits. Pits shall be well ventilated, drained, and lighted, and shall be large enough to safely accommodate the kiln operator together with operating devices such as valves, dampers, damper rods, and traps.

== See also ==
- Shakes (timber)
