= Sports Collectors Digest =

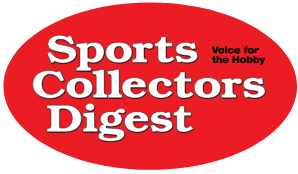
- Editor: Dave Strege
- Categories: Sport
- Founder: Stommen Family
- Founded: 1973; 53 years ago
- Company: Active Interest Media
- Country: United States
- Based in: Iola, Wisconsin
- Language: English
- Website: sportscollectorsdigest.com

Sports Collectors Digest (SCD) is an American advertising weekly published at Iola, Wisconsin. The magazine provides an avenue through which sellers, traders and avid buyers of sports cards and other memorabilia may interact.

== History and profile ==
SCD was started in 1973 by the Stommen family. In 1981 it was purchased by Krause Publications; Krause was acquired by F+W Media in 2002.

The thickness of the magazine has varied throughout the years, and could arguably be seen as a reflection of the sports collecting market. For example, the July 13, 1990 issue contained 332 pages; however, the January 22, 2010 issue was only 36 pages long. Accounts of some athletes of the past and their activities festoon some of the pages. Other issues are written similarly. Pages are 11x14 inches (28x35.5 cm).

SCD has long billed itself as "The Voice of the Hobby" and mixes hobby news with features, collecting stories, athlete profiles and opinion. The magazine is one of the few publications that have been successful in the sports card and memorabilia hobby. Its accompanying website offers content similar to the magazine, with an Auction Prices Realized database that is the only one of its kind in the hobby. The site also offers videos, blogs, features and a forum.

Classified ads remain a staple of the magazine, although it is rare when classifieds fill a full page. Many collectors have relied on the SCD classifieds over the years to build and maintain their collections. Before the Internet, it was a major source for buyers and sellers in the hobby to network.

The magazine remains the sports collecting hobby's leading news publication with a loyal subscriber base. SCD has been affected by the trend toward selling collectibles on the Internet. Issues have shrunk, and the publication rarely features fresh editorial product. In recent issues, editors have recycled 10-year-old, previously published interviews. Correspondents who provided columns and features were dropped for budgetary reasons and most of the limited editorial content is produced in-house.
