= SCBC =

SCBC may refer to:

- Selwyn College Boat Club
- Somerville College Boat Club
- South Carolina Baptist Convention
- South Coast Baptist College
- South College Boat Club, the rowing club of South College at Durham University in England
- Standard Catalogue of British Coins
- Stephenson College Boat Club, the rowing club of Stephenson College at Durham University in England
- Sudan Catholic Bishops' Conference
- Supreme Court of British Columbia
- ICAO code for Cacique Blanco Airport
