= Novel & Short Story Writer's Market =

Novel & Short Story Writer's Market

Novel & Short Story Writer's Market (NSSWM) is an annual resource guide for fiction writers that compiles hundreds of listings for book publishers, magazines, literary agents, writing contests, and conferences. NSSWM is published by Writer's Digest Books and usually hits bookstores around August of each year.

== The Market Listings ==
For 26 years, NSSWM has listed hundreds of U.S. and international magazines and book publishers who are open to submissions from fiction writers. Listings provide current contact information, editorial needs, schedules, submission guidelines, and payment and contract terms. All listings are updated annually.

== The Articles ==
In addition to the market listings, the book contains interviews with and essays by best-selling and award-winning writers, as well as editors and agents.

== Writer's Digest Books ==
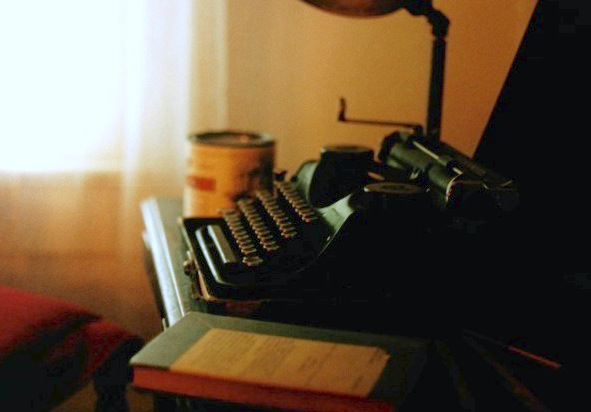
A copy of the 1939 edition of Writer's Market rests next to William Faulkner's Underwood Universal Portable typewriter in his office at his home, Rowan Oak, which is now maintained by the University of Mississippi in Oxford as a museum.

Novel & Short Story Writer's Market is one of eight "market books" published each year by Writer's Digest Books - the most famous of which is Writer's Market, a book that lists thousands of magazine and book publishers listings for writers. Others include: Photographer's Market, Children's Writer's and Illustrator's Market, Guide to Literary Agents, Artist and Graphic Designer's Market, Poet's Market and Songwriter's Market. Each book is designed to give creatives instructions on how to submit work for publication.

== See also ==
- Publishing
- Writer's Digest
- Writer's Market
- Writers' & Artists' Yearbook
- query
- royalties
- Authors Guild
