= Albert Osborn =

Albert Osborn may refer to:

- Albert L. Osborn (1858–1940), member of the Wisconsin State Assembly
- Albert S. Osborn (1858–1946), considered the father of the science of questioned document examination in North America

== See also ==
- Albert Orsborn (1886–1967), sixth General of The Salvation Army
