= R.W. Julian =

American numismatist, researcher and author (born 1938)

- Born: December 8, 1938 (age 87); Logansport, Indiana, U.S.
- Other name: Robert W. Julian
- Occupations: Numismatist, author
- Years active: 1960-present
- Known for: Columnist, author

Robert W. "R.W." Julian (born December 8, 1938) is an American numismatist, author, and researcher.

== Education and career ==
Julian was educated at Purdue University, where he received a bachelor's and master's degree. He spent close to 30 years as a teacher before retiring in 1994.

Julian began collecting coins in 1949 and began his writing career in 1960. He has written for numerous numismatic publications, including Numismatic News, COINage, and Coins. He has contributed over 1,300 individual articles on numismatics during his career.

During his career he has written several books, including: Medals of the United States Mint, The First Century, 1792–1892 (1977); From Rus to Revolution; Russian Coins Through A Thousand Years (1988); Medals of the U.S. Assay Commission, 1860–1977 (1989); and Russian Silver Coinage, 1796–1917 (1993).

Between 1977 and 1981, Julian released a series of five satirical medals in bronze and silver.

Julian is also an accomplished researcher who has extensively studied the history of the United States Mint and its records. He has contributed various articles to The Numismatist detailing Mint expense reports from the 1800s, and has written extensively on the early Mint's practice of using dies long past their date. (For example, although there are 1823-dated large cents, only proofs were actually struck in that year; all circulation-strike 1823 cents were actually struck from prepared dies in 1824).

== Awards and honors ==
Julian has won several awards for his writing career, including the Burnett Anderson Memorial Award in 2002, and was elected to the American Numismatic Association Hall of Fame in 1998. He was named the ANA's Numismatist of the Year in 2012.

In 2021 and 2024, Julian was named one of Coin World's Most Influential People in Numismatics (1960–2020).

In 2025, Julian was awarded the ANA's Lifetime Achievement Award.
