= R. Bruce Hoadley =

Robert Bruce Hoadley
- Born: 1933; Waterbury, Connecticut, U.S.
- Died: October 15, 2019 (aged 86); Leverett, Massachusetts, U.S.
- Spouse: Barbara L. Hoadley
- Children: Susan Hoadley; Lindsay Hoadley
- Relatives: 3 grandchildren; 2 siblings

Robert Bruce Hoadley (1933 – October 15, 2019) was Professor Emeritus of Building and Construction Materials in the Department of Environmental Conservation at the University of Massachusetts Amherst.

His main research interests were wood identification and dimensional changes due to wood-moisture relationships. He is known to the general public primarily as the author of popular books on the anatomy, properties and processing of wood, and for his work as a contributing editor and technical consultant for Fine Woodworking magazine. His expertise in wood identification has been utilized in analysis of antique furniture and art objects for Sotheby's and major museums.

His book Identifying Wood: Accurate results with simple tools is an accessible introduction to the topic, and his Understanding Wood is a comprehensive treatment of wood technology. The first edition of this work sold over 130,000 copies.

== Publications ==
- Hoadley, Robert Bruce (1990). Identifying Wood: Accurate results with simple tools. Taunton Press. ISBN 9780942391046.
- Hoadley, Robert Bruce (2000). Understanding Wood: A Craftsman's Guide to Wood Technology. Taunton Press. ISBN 9781561583584.
