= Clifford Thompson =

American entertainer (1904–1955)

Clifford Marshall Thompson (October 18, 1904 – October 15, 1955) was one of the world's tallest men, the world's tallest lawyer, and remains the tallest man to ever appear in a Hollywood film.

Born in Rugby, North Dakota, as a child Thompson moved with his parents to Scandinavia, Wisconsin. He claimed to be 8 feet 7 inches (2.62 m) and weigh 460 pounds (210 kg), but a researcher named Craig Albert more recently used photo-analysis to determine his size was somewhere between 8’3″ and 8’6″ tall.

He was known as "The Scandinavian Giant," "The Wisconsin Paul Bunyan," and "Count Olaf" . Thompson appeared in many Hollywood films, including A Day in the Life of a Giant and Seal Skins. Later he enrolled in Marquette University and earned a law degree. Thompson practiced law in downtown Iola, Wisconsin.

A biography of Robert Pershing Wadlow recites that Thompson wanted to meet up with Wadlow in Decatur, Illinois. The local newspaper tried to arrange a meeting and offered to pay all expenses for Thompson's travels, but the deal fell through. Thompson never took up the $50 offer to prove that he was taller than Wadlow, taking up the title of world's tallest man after the latter's death. An often told story is that Thompson made a challenge to Wadlow to come to his hometown to prove that Wadlow was just 'another faker'. When both men walked on stage, Wadlow held out his arm and Thompson was easily under it. To which Wadlow replied "When you grow up you will be an awfully big boy." The challenger was actually Cliff Maynard of Arkansas.
