= COINage =

American magazine

- December 2006 issue of COINage
- Editor: Scott A. Travers, Antoinette Rahn
- Categories: Coins, Numismatics
- Frequency: Bi-Monthly
- Format: Magazine
- Publisher: Beckett Media
- Founded: 1964; 61 years ago
- Based in: Ventura, California
- Language: English
- Website: www.coinagemag.com
- ISSN: 0010-0455

COINage, is a bi-monthly American special-interest magazine, targeting numismatists and coin investors. Behn-Miller Publications, Inc. - under the joint ownership of Gordon Behn and COINage editorial director James L. Miller - originally published the magazine on a quarterly basis. During that period it was based in Dallas, Texas. In 1965 the magazine moved to a bi-monthly publishing schedule, before moving to a monthly publishing schedule from 1966 until 2019.

COINage is a specialty publication catering to the numismatic market. It was acquired by Entrust Global Group (E.G.G.) in May 2014. It is published from Ventura, California.

== Content ==
COINage focuses primarily on American coins, although articles on paper money and non-American coins have appeared. Some of the topics covered in the magazine include:

- Numismatic history
- Coins minted in the US
- Bullion and precious metals
- Future production of coins and bullion, including commemoratives
- Upcoming relesses and events from the United States Mint

=== Regular Columns ===
In addition to the feature stories, each issue contains a variety of columns, including:

It's News to Me - An editorial column focusing on recent events on the Numismatic world

Market Report - Focusing on new and upcoming releases from the United States Mint

COINage Confidential - Interview series with numismatic businessmen and personalities, including coin shop owners, graders, and others

Investment Report - James Passin's bullion column

== History ==
COINage debuted with the Winter 1964 issue.

COINage has seen major changes in the frequency and format of publication in its more than half century existence. It changed ownership in May 2014 when it was acquired by E.G.G. Earlier. There was no regular editor-in-chief for this magazine as a matter of official policy to prevent any narrowing of focus. There are also digital copies available.

In October 2019, the magazine changed from a monthly publishing format to bi-monthly publishing.

== Distribution channels ==
The primary distribution channel is the official website. However, subscribers source new and old issues from sites like Amazon, magazines.com, and magzter.com. It is also sold at the periodicals section of Barnes & Noble. It has a Facebook page to connect to readers and potential subscribers.

The magazine is also distributed through specialty book stores and newsstands. Along with Coins, it was one of the top numismatic magazines by circulation, with 71,460 subscribers as of October 2009.

== Recognitions ==
It was the winner in 5 categories for the 2016 and in four categories for the 2017 Numismatic Literary Guild Awards.
