= Fine Woodworking =

American woodworking magazine

- August 2000 cover, 25th anniversary year
- Frequency: Monthly
- Publisher: Active Interest Media
- Founded: 1975
- Country: United States
- Based in: Newtown, Connecticut
- Language: English
- Website: http://www.finewoodworking.com/

Fine Woodworking is a woodworking magazine published by Active Interest Media in Newtown, Connecticut, USA.

== History and profile ==
The magazine began publication in 1975 by Taunton Press, with simple monochrome printing and stapled monochrome covers. Founded by Paul and Jan Roman, the magazine solicited articles from experienced woodworkers and only accepted advertising for products related to woodworking.

The magazine focuses on the very best of woodworking techniques at the highest level of skill. Articles include practical tutorials on technique, the theory of timber, finishes or tools, as well as showcases for high-quality finished work. The magazine emphasizes high-quality work regardless of the difficulty of execution.

There are many "project" articles.

== Notable contributors ==
- Tage Frid
- R. Bruce Hoadley
- Richard Raffan

== Related publications ==
Since the first issues, subscribers have collected back issues. Taunton encourages this, with sales of back issues and the publication of indexes.

Collected volumes have also been produced in book form. These began as collections of the best general articles in a numbered series '"Fine Woodworking" Techniques' (8 volumes from 1985 to 1986). Later there were more strongly-themed "Best of Fine Woodworking" collections on particular topics such as: "Joinery", "Making and Modifying Machines", "Bending Wood", "Woodshop Specialities" and many others.

Taunton also operates a website for Fine Woodworking.
