= Chester Krause =

American author, numismatist and businessman (1923–2016)

Chester L. Krause
- Chester Krause in 2009
- Born: December 16, 1923; Helvetia, Wisconsin, U.S.
- Died: June 25, 2016 (aged 92); Iola, Wisconsin, U.S.
- Occupations: Numismatist, author
- Years active: 1952–2014
- Known for: Founder of Krause Publications
- Notable work: Standard Catalog of World Coins, Numismatic News, Coins

Chester Lee "Chet" Krause (December 16, 1923 – June 25, 2016) was an American author, numismatist, and businessman who founded Krause Publications in the 1950s.

== Early life ==
Krause was born in the Town of Helvetia, Wisconsin, in Waupaca County, Wisconsin. He started collecting when he was a boy and his aunts gave him some Whitman coin boards.

Krause served as an auto mechanic in World War II in Belgium, Luxembourg and Germany from 1943 to 1946, serving under George S. Patton. After his discharge, Krause worked on his family's farm and worked on many construction projects.

== Career ==
In 1952, Krause began his publishing career, publishing the first issue of Numismatic News. He also published the Standard Catalog of World Paper Money and Standard Catalog of World Coins, both considered among the hobby's premier resources of the time. In 1955, he expanded the company's numismatic portfolio by creating Coins. Numismatic News is still published and is among the longest-running numismatic publications in the United States.

Krause's goal was to bring the coin collecting hobby to people in areas generally ignored by other publications and news outlets at the time, which were mainly focused in larger cities. Krause, who was a construction worker by trade, built the publications' offices, which were completed in 1957 and remained the business's home for decades. In 1971, he began publishing a line of publications for car and auto enthusiasts in an effort to diversify and expand his business. He founded the annual Iola Old Car Show in 1972, which has grown to 130,000 attendees each year.

Krause served on the American Numismatic Association board of governors from 2007 until 2010.

== Honors and awards ==
Krause was a life member of the American Numismatic Association, and was awarded several awards from the ANA, including the Medal of Merit, Glenn Smedley Memorial Award in 1991, Exemplary Service Award, Numismatist of the Year in 1999, Lifetime Achievement Award, the Burnett Anderson Memorial Award in 2009 and the Farran Zerbe Memorial Award, the organization's highest honor, in 1977. In June 2022, the Farran Zerbe Award was renamed the Chester L. Krause Memorial Distinguished Service Award in his honor. Clifford Mishler spearheaded an effort to dedicate a park in Iola, Wisconsin, in his honor, which opened in October 2023 in honor of his 100th birthday.

== Personal life ==
Krause was active in many charities and organizations including Rawhide Boy's Ranch, a residential facility for at-risk youth founded by Bart Starr and his wife Cherry, the Badger State Winter Games, the Melvin Laird Center medical research facility at the Marshfield Clinic and the Max McGee National Research Center for Juvenile Diabetes at the Children's Hospital of Milwaukee. He suffered a stroke in 2014, and died after a bad fall in January 2016.
