= Antique Trader =

American collector's mag

- Categories: Hobby magazine
- Frequency: Biweekly
- Founded: 1957
- Company: Active Interest Media
- Country: United States
- Based in: Stevens Point, Wisconsin
- Language: English
- Website: www.antiquetrader.com
- ISSN: 0161-8342

Antique Trader is a full-color American magazine about antiques and collectibles, including a classifieds section, published twice monthly, including six double issues.

Headquartered in Stevens Point, Wis., the highly designed and illustrated magazine features in-depth articles on antique and collecting trends, informative and entertaining stories and profiles of key industry players and personalities, antique show and auction previews and highlights, decor and market trends. Columnists write about the business of antiques, costume jewelry, furniture, bottle collecting and travel. The magazine features articles on antiques-related businesses such as shops, auction houses and corollary services. In addition, Antique Traders offers a website, AntiqueTrader.com.

== History ==
Founded in 1957 by Ed Babka and Babka Publishing Co. in Decatur, Ill., Antique Trader started as an all classified advertising newspaper connecting buyers and sellers of antique and collectible items. In 1972, under the editorial direction of antiques expert Kyle Husfloen, the publication added antique industry and collecting news. It later spun off a book line, including the annual Antique Trader Antiques & Collectibles Price Guide", last published in 2018.

In 1992, Babka Publishing sold Antique Trader and its related entities to Landmark Communications, which, in turn, resold the titles to Krause Publications in 1999. The magazine took on the F+W Media Inc. label after that company acquired Krause in 2002. Active Interest Media, a Des Moines, Iowa-based media company, purchased "Antique Trader" in 2019.

== Executives ==
Paul Kennedy is editorial director of the magazine while Kristine Manty is online editor. Corinne Zielke is VP/General Manager. The magazine, which is created in both a print and digital format, is designed by creative director Edie Mann. Tim Baldwin manages advertising sales.
