= Fibre saturation point =

Fibre saturation point is a term used in wood mechanics and especially wood drying, to denote the point in the drying process at which only water bound in the cell walls remains - all other water, called free water, having been removed from the cell cavities.

Further drying of the wood results in strengthening of the wood fibres, and is usually accompanied by shrinkage. Wood is normally dried to a point where it is in equilibrium with the atmospheric moisture content or relative humidity, and since this varies so does the equilibrium moisture content.

Laboratory testing has found the average FSP in many types of wood to be approximately 26%. Individual species may differ from the average.
