= Lapidary Journal Jewelry Artist =

US magazine

- Categories: Crafts
- Frequency: 9 per year
- Founded: 1947
- Company: Interweave
- Country: United States
- Based in: Devon, Pennsylvania
- Language: English
- Website: www.interweave.com/jewelry/
- ISSN: 1936-5942

The Lapidary Journal Jewelry Artist is an American magazine dedicated to lapidary interests such as gemology, jewelry design, metalworking, mineralogy, rocks, and gemstones.

The magazine was established in 1947 as the Lapidary Journal, and was renamed to its current title in 2005.

The headquarters of the magazine is in Devon, Pennsylvania.

It is published by Interweave Press, a subsidiary of F+W Media, Inc.
