= Barney S. Peterson =

American politician

Barney S. Peterson (May 29, 1853 – February 17, 1931) was a member of the Wisconsin State Assembly.

== Biography ==
Peterson was born to Norwegian immigrants on May 29, 1853 in Scandinavia, Wisconsin. He later lived in Iola, Wisconsin. In 1882, he married Amelia Larsen. They had four children before she died in 1898. In 1905, Peterson married Clara Hermansen. They had one son. He died at his home in Iola in 1931.

== Career ==
Peterson was elected to the Assembly in 1902. Previously, he had served two terms as Sheriff of Waupaca County, Wisconsin. He was a Republican.
