= Richard Raffan =

Salad bowls, made of Ash in 1986, 5 3/4" diameter. In regular use for over 30 years. Brooklyn, NY - 2012.

Richard Raffan (born 1943) is a British-born Australian woodturner, author, and instructor. He has helped popularize the craft of woodturning since the 1970s.

== Biography ==
Richard Raffan was born in 1943 at Zeal Monachorum in Devon, United Kingdom. He lived in Sydney, Australia from 1947 to 1950, and returned to Devon where he was raised. He studied at Exeter College of Art and Design, then worked in a wine shipper before beginning turning in England in 1970. He emigrated to Australia in 1982.

Raffan was a part of the "art turning" movement that saw turned objects move into galleries where they are presented as works of art. Although he has created large and valuable works of exotic woods, in his books he has also championed simple utilitarian works created for daily use. He finishes much of this work simply, using vegetable oil and beeswax, and has written admiringly of the patina of well used wooden items. "An indescribable surface that begs for a caress of the hand--that's what I think wood should provide."

Raffan is known for using native Australian woods, for the architectural influences in his turned objects, and for his groupings of related objects into sets (e.g. his "Citadel" and "Tower" series of boxes, etc.)

== Books ==
Richard Raffan has written the following books published by Taunton Press:

- Taunton's Complete Illustrated Guide to Turning (2004). ISBN 978-1-56158-672-1.
- The Art of Turned Bowls (2008). ISBN 978-1-56158-954-8.
- Turning Bowls with Richard Raffan (2001), ISBN 978-1-56158-508-3.
- Turning Boxes with Richard Raffan (2002). ISBN 978-1-56158-509-0.
- Turning Projects with Richard Raffan, Third Edition (2008). ISBN 978-1-56158-956-2.
- Turning Wood with Richard Raffan, Third Edition(2008). ISBN 978-1-56158-956-2.
- Woodturning Basics (2007). (Contributor) Special issue of Fine Woodworking

Richard Raffan has starred in the following videos:

- The New Turning Wood DVD (2008). ISBN 978-1-56158-957-9.
- Turning Bowls DVD (2009). ISBN 978-1-60085-147-6.
- Turning Boxes DVD. ISBN 978-1-56158-707-0.
- Turning Projects DVD. ISBN 978-1-56158-708-7.
