= PixelMags =

Company that delivers digital versions of magazines and catalogs to digital devices

PixelMags Inc.
- Industry: Digital distribution
- Founded: 2009
- Founder: Ryan Marquis and Mark Stubbs
- Products: Magazines, books

PixelMags Inc. is a digital distribution company that delivers digital versions of magazines and catalogs to digital devices. It is a content distributor for digital platforms and an authorized developer for iPhone, iPad, Android, Redr and Kindle Fire. They also have a desktop viewer. It was co-founded by Ryan Marquis and Mark Stubbs in 2009 and was the world's first digital magazine publishing company to appear on iPhone. They publish magazines and books and push magazine content downloads to devices worldwide. They have secured over $20M US in funding.

== Clients ==
Magazines and other publications that wish to have an online presence through this platform first upload a PDF of their content. PixelMags then prepares the material by providing these actions: content analysis, preparation and deconstruction; quality control; piracy tracking and distribution. The content is then made available in PixelMags' "Newsstands" for paid consumer consumption through created apps.

== See also ==
- Digital Photographer magazine
- Play (UK magazine)
- Multi Format Publishing
