= List of coin catalogs =

A coin catalog (or coin catalogue) is a listing of coin types. Information may include pictures of the obverse and reverse (front and back), date and place of minting, distribution type, translation of inscriptions, description of images, theme, metal type, mintage, edge description, orientation of the coin, weight, diameter, thickness, design credentials, shape and prices for various grades. Defects may also be described.

The quality, detail and completeness of the information available about a particular coin varies according to popularity, commonality, and available scholarly research. Because of the huge number of coins in world history, there are no comprehensive catalogs. Professional collectors typically keep many books for identification and assessment. The other form is the auction catalog, where only those specific coins available in the auction are described, with photo plates available for some of the more prominent coins.

== List of notable catalogs ==
- A Guide Book of United States Coins, more popularly known as the Red Book
- Standard Catalog of World Coins
- Standard Catalogue of British Coins
- British Museum Catalogues of Coins

== See also ==
- Coin collecting
- Coin grading
