= Literary agent =

Type of agent

A literary agent is an agent who represents writers and their written works to publishers, theatrical producers, film producers, and film studios, and assists in sale and deal negotiation. Literary agents most often represent novelists, screenwriters, and non-fiction writers.

Reputable literary agents generally charge a commission and do not charge a fee upfront. The commission rate is generally 15%.

== Diversity ==
Literary agencies can range in size from a single agent who represents perhaps a dozen authors, to a substantial firm with senior partners, sub-agents, specialists in areas like foreign rights or licensed merchandise tie-ins, and clients numbering in the hundreds. Most agencies, especially smaller ones, specialize to some degree. They may represent—for example—authors of science fiction, mainstream thrillers and mysteries, children's books, romance, or highly topical nonfiction. Very few agents represent short stories or poetry.

Legitimate agents and agencies in the book world are not required to be members of the Association of Authors' Representatives (AAR), but according to Writer's Market listings, many agents in the United States are. To qualify for AAR membership, agents must have sold a minimum number of books and pledge to abide by a Canon of Ethics.

== See also ==
- Writer's Market
- List of UK literary agencies
