= Paper money catalog =

Type of catalog

A paper money catalog or banknote catalog (or catalogue) is a catalog of banknotes and articles relating to notable examples. The catalog is an essential tool of collecting as it provides information about the articles that many times cannot be extracted from them directly, such as the number of printed banknotes.

In the 1950s, Robert Friedberg published the Paper Money of the United States. Friedberg devised an organizing number system of all types of U.S. banknotes; the system is widely accepted among collectors and dealers to this day, and the volume has been regularly updated.

Another pioneer of cataloging banknotes was Albert Pick, a well-known German notaphilist (born 15 May 1922 in Cologne) who published a number of catalogs of European paper money, and, in 1974, the first Standard Catalog of World Paper Money. His collection of over 180,000 banknotes was eventually housed at the Bavarian Mortgages and Exchange Bank (Bayerischen Hypotheken- und Wechselbank, now HypoVereinsbank). This catalog underwent several incarnations, and is currently published as a three volume group. Volume I, called Specialized Issues, includes notes issued by local authorities, which circulated in a limited area. Volume II called General Issues covers notes issued on a national scope, dated 1368 through 1960. Volume III covers Modern Issues dated 1960 to present. Each of the volumes is updated regularly, with Volume III now updated every year, Volumes I and II every three or so years. From 1994-2015 George S. Cuhaj was editor, and Pick died in 2015, but the catalogs are still commonly referred to as 'Pick Catalogs' and dealers and collectors alike refer to banknotes by their 'Pick number'. Current issues of the three volumes include:

- Standard Catalog of World Paper Money: Specialized Issues (11th Ed. Vol. 1) by George S. Cuhaj. Paperback - 1246 pages. (November 16, 2009).
- Standard Catalog of World Paper Money: General Issues to 1368-1960 (14th Ed. Vol. 2) by George S. Cuhaj. Paperback - 1295 pages. (October 29, 2012).
- Standard Catalog of World Paper Money: Modern Issues, 1961–present (21st Ed. Vol. 3) by George S. Cuhaj. Paperback - 1159 pages. (April, 2015).

== See also ==
- Paper money collecting
- Standard Catalog of World Paper Money
