= Standard Catalogue of British Coins =

Reference work of the British currency

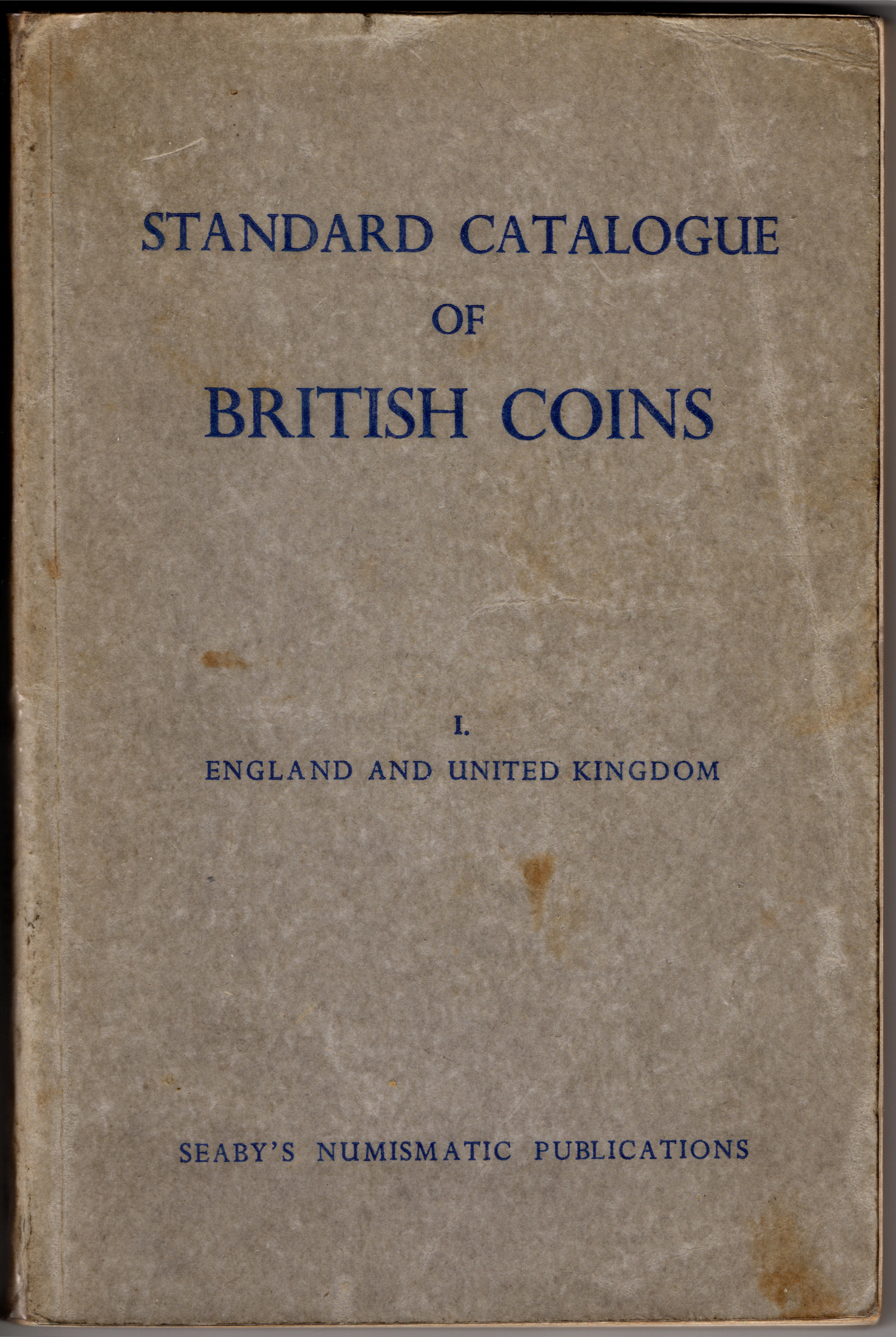
First edition, 1962

The Standard Catalogue of British Coins, also known as Coins of England and the United Kingdom and after its founder as the Seaby Catalogue or S. for short, is an English-language coin catalog published annually by Sovereign Rarities Ltd, split into two issues (the Pre-decimal issue for coins up until 1970, and the Decimal issue for all coins minted subsequently).

== Scope and relevance ==
The catalogue covers all coins that have circulated in the British Isles, from the earliest times when coins were introduced from northern Gaul around 150 BC to the most recent new issues of the Royal Mint. It is considered the industry-standard reference book for British coins and an essential guide for beginners, serious numismatists and anyone interested in British Coinage. Its catalogue numbers are applied internationally and are quoted by auction houses and dealers.

== History ==
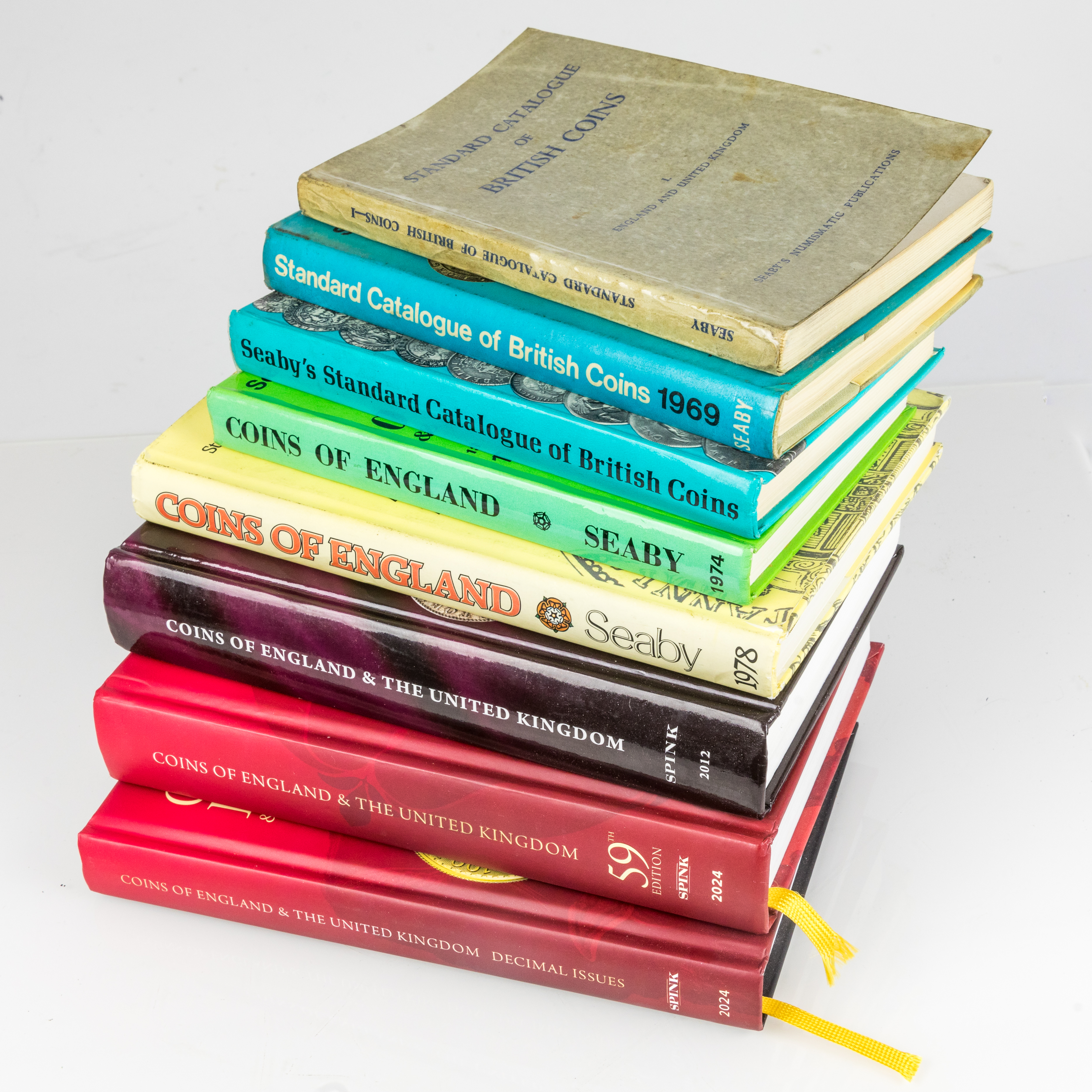
Standard Catalogue of British Coins: Vol.I. England and the United Kingdom, over 60 years from 1st edition (Seaby, 1962) to 59th / 10th (pre-decimal / decimal, Spink, 2024), before its continuation under Sovereign Rarities Ltd into its 60th / 11th, 61st / 12th and 62nd / 13th editions.

Coins of England and the United Kingdom was first published in 1929 by the London coin dealer B.A. Seaby Ltd. as a brochure under the title Catalogue of Coins of Great Britain and Ireland, then biennially until the outbreak of war in 1939. On this basis Herbert A. Seaby (1898–1979) wrote the Standard Catalogue of the Coins of Great Britain and Ireland, during the war, which was again published biennially from 1945 onwards and illustrated with line drawings of the coins.

The latest edition for 2027 of the Standard Catalogue of British Coins, otherwise known as the Coins of England: Pre-decimal issues, available from Sovereign Rarities Ltd's website

Edited by Peter Seaby, the Standard Catalogue of British Coins was published from 1962 onwards in two parts, I. England and United Kingdom and II. Coins of Scotland, Ireland and the Islands, in annual editions and with black and white photos of the coins.

After a one-year break, Volume I (16th edition) was published from 1978 and Volume II in 1979 in an enlarged format, edited by Peter Seaby and P. Frank Purvey, until the company Spink & Son took over the entire publishing division of B.A. Seaby Ltd. and published the Standard Catalogue in its own name from the 33rd edition in 1997 until the 59th edition in 2024. With the 42nd edition, it was converted to colour printing in 2007, and every coin in the catalogue was re-photographed for this purpose.

The latest edition for 2027 of the Standard Catalogue of British Coins, otherwise known as the Coins of England: Decimal issues, available from Sovereign Rarities Ltd's website

In 2015, Volume I was split into Coins of England & the United Kingdom, Pre-Decimal Issues, and Coins of England & the United Kingdom, Decimal Issues. Established coin dealership Sovereign Rarities Ltd purchased the rights to all three editions in mid-2024, releasing the 2025 editions (60th and 11th respectively) later that year, and publishing the 2026 and 2027 editions since then.

In 2026, the Coins of Scotland, Ireland and the Islands (Jersey, Guernsey, Man & Lundy) including Anglo-Gallic Coins edition (1962's Volume II) was given an overdue update to its 5th edition. Including significant price changes, major reworking of both Scottish and Irish sections, serious academic review and reordering of the Henry VI to Edward IV Irish series in particular, this volume has become a "must-have" for collectors across these series.

The Coins of England and the United Kingdom remains the only catalogue to feature every major coin type from Celtic to the Decimal coinage of Queen Elizabeth II, arranged in chronological order and divided into metals under each reign, then into coinages, denominations and varieties (57th edition, 2022). As of 2027, the individual volumes are available in the 62nd, 13th and 5th editions respectively.
