= Standard Catalog of World Paper Money =

Catalogue of banknotes

The Standard Catalog of World Paper Money was a well-known catalogue of banknotes that was published by Krause Publications in three volumes. These catalogues are commonly known in the numismatic trade as the Pick catalogues, as the numbering system was originally compiled by Albert Pick, but are also referred to as "Krause" or "SCWPM". Since the mid-1980s the titles have been owned by Krause Publications, and from 1994–2016 were under the editorship of George S. Cuhaj, and subsequently by Tracy L. Schmidt.

== Numbering system ==
The numbering system uses an integer to identify a note. The sorting of notes is usually by issue series/date, then ascending by denomination. Some varieties also have an alphabetic prefix, with a capital letter or letters.

- A prefix of "A" or "B" is used to insert older series which were not cataloged when the numbering system was established.
- A prefix of "CS" is used for made-for-collector merchandise such as souvenir folders, uncut pairs/strips/sheets, special serial numbers, booklets, etc.; the numbers after "CS" are sometimes sequential (1, 2, 3, etc.) in which case these products are listed after all regular notes, and other times are the equivalent of the normal note, in which case these items are listed right after the regular version of each note.
- A prefix of "FX" is used for Foreign Exchange Certificates.
- A prefix of "M" designates military issues (often occupation issues, or military scrip); these have been moved to the "Specialized" catalog.
- A prefix of "R" is used for certain regional notes, which have also been moved to the "Specialized" catalog.
- A prefix of "S" is used to represent "Specialized" issues which are cataloged separately (often, though inconsistently, private banks, regional issues, emergency issues, local notes, etc.).

In common usage, but not in the catalog itself, it is a common practice to prefix "P" to the catalog number (and any prefixes or suffixes, to designate that this is a "Pick" number; however, this is not a practice of the catalog themselves. If there are prefixes, in this usage, they will follow the "P" (e.g. "P5", "PS101a", "PM3" or "PFX").

Inconsistently, if a note has signature or date or other variants, then a lower case letter follows (e.g. P120a, P120b, P120c, etc.); in some cases though, multiple dates are assigned to a single variant; e.g. "1936–1940; 1942; 1945". From edition to edition, these variety letters may change, as additional dates and signatures are found, and as the editors decide to add more granularity.

- A suffix of "ct" is used for color trial proofs (sometimes listed as "tc")
- A suffix of "r" is used for either a "remainder" (mostly 19th century incomplete printings) or a "replacement" note.
- A suffix of "p" is used for "proof" notes.
- A suffix of "s" is used for "specimen" notes.
- A suffix of "tc" is used for "trial color proofs".
- A suffix of "x" is used to denote certain varieties, such as counterfeits or errors.

Where there are multiple versions of proofs, remainders or specimens, and occasionally other variations, they are often cataloged with a number after the letter, e.g. "p1", "p2", "s1" or "s2".

If a number needs to be inserted between two numbers, then in some cases, the section is renumbered—which creates confusion, and some collectors will annotate this with the previous number in parentheses .. e.g. 6(5) would indicate the current Pick number is 6, but it was once 5. But in other cases, the entries are not renumbered, and then the format is to use a suffix capital letter (e.g. P120A).

== Edition ==
Most recent editions, as of August 2019.

Standard Catalog of World Paper Money

1. Standard Catalog of World Paper Money – General Issues, 1368–1960, 16th Edition, publication date 2016, Krause Publications, ISBN 978-1-4402-4707-1
  This is updated every two years or so.
2. Standard Catalog of World Paper Money – Modern Issues, 1961–Present, 25th Edition, publication date 2019, Krause Publications, ISBN 978-1-4402-4898-6
  This is updated every year.
3. Standard Catalog of World Paper Money – Specialized Issues, 12th Edition, publication date 2013, Krause Publications, ISBN 978-1-4402-3883-3
  This is updated every four years or so.

All with digital copy available separately.

Other related catalogs

- Standard Catalog of United States Paper Money, 35th Edition, publication date 2016, Krause Publications, ISBN 978-1-4402-4708-8
  Digital copy available separately.

== See also ==
- Standard Catalog of World Coins
- Paper money catalog
- Paper money collecting
