= F+W =

American media company (1913–2019)

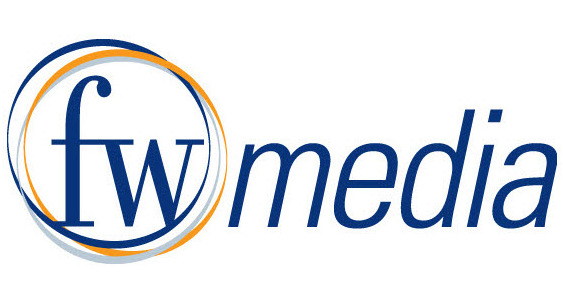
- Status: Defunct (2019)
- Founded: 1913
- Founder: Edward Rosenthal
- Defunct: 2019
- Country of origin: United States
- Headquarters location: New York City, New York
- Publication types: Magazines, books
- No. of employees: 700
- Official website: fwmedia.com (defunct)

F+W (formerly F+W Publications and F+W Media) was a media and e-commerce company headquartered in New York City. Founded in 1913 in Cincinnati, F+W published magazines, books, digital products (including e-books and e-magazines), produced online video, offered online education, and owned and operated e-stores, as well as consumer and trade shows.

== History ==
F+W was named after two of its early publications: Farm Quarterly and Writer's Digest. The company grew though a series of acquisitions, including book publisher David & Charles, Krause Publications in 2002, Horticulture magazine, and Adams Media in 2003. The private equity firm ABRY Partners purchased F+W in 2005. In August 2012 F+W Media acquired Interweave, an arts and crafts media company based in Loveland, Colorado. In 2014, F+W Media acquired New Track Media, renamed itself F+W, and was acquired by the private equity company Tinicum. David Nussbaum, CEO, departed the company to become the CEO of America’s Test Kitchen, a year after the acquisition.

In 2008, the company began to focus more on e-commerce activities and offering products and services related to the content of its magazines. The e-commerce business grew from one store with $6 million in revenue in 2008 to 31 e-commerce stores with more than $65 million for 2015, when Tinicum purchased the company. In May 2017, some creditors received a 97% stake in the company in exchange for debt relief and a new line of credit.

== Demise ==
In January 2018, with the CEO and two other top executives leaving the company, F+W slashed its workforce by 40%.

F+W filed for Chapter 11 bankruptcy protection on March 10, 2019. The book publishing assets of the company were won by Penguin Random House at a bankruptcy auction in June 2019. The grouping of the assets drew criticism. Several properties including Sky & Telescope were sold individually.

== Overview ==
F+W Media was a special interest content provider and marketer of enthusiast magazines, books, conferences, trade shows, and interactive media properties.

F+W's special-interest categories included art, crafts, mixed media, writing, genealogy, antiques and collectibles, graphic design, hunting. In 2011 the Company entered the fiction market with the acquisition of Tyrus Books. In 2012, the company launched imprints in romance (Crimson Romance) and young adult fiction (Merit Press).

Publications were organized around some 20 community-based units, each of which focuses on a particular special interest category. The company also published about 600 new book titles annually, and had a library of some 4000 titles.

Its brands were David & Charles, Impact Books, Krause Publications, North Light Books, Writer's Digest and Interweave Press.

== Situation after dissolution ==
In June 2019, the assets of F+W were sold at bankruptcy auctions.

Ownership structure after dissolution of F+W
Assets	New owner
F+W Books	Became an imprint of Penguin Random House's Penguin Publishing Group division
F&W Media International	Became David & Charles again in a management buyout
Crafts segment including the magazines: Beadwork; Burda Style USA (50%); Creative Machine Embroidery; Easy Quilts; Interweave Crochet; Interweave Knits; Knitscene; Lapidary Journal Jewelry Artist; Love of Quilting; McCall's Quilting; Quick Quilts; Quilting Arts; Quiltmaker; Sew News	Peak Media Properties
Handwoven; PieceWork; Spin Off	Long Thread Media
Fine Arts segment including the magazines: Artist's Magazine; Pastel Journal; Southwest Art; Watercolor Artist	Peak Media Properties
Construction Trade segment including the magazines: Frame Building News; Metal Roofing; Rural Builder	Shield Wall Media
Family Tree	Yankee Publishing
Horticulture; Popular Woodworking; Writer's Digest	Active Interest Media
Collectibles segment consisting of the magazines: Antique Trader; Bank Note Reporter; Coins; Goldmine; Military Trader; Military Vehicles; Numismatic News; Old Cars Price Guide; Old Cars Weekly; Sports Collectors Digest; World Coin News	Active Interest Media
Sky & Telescope	American Astronomical Society
Outdoors segment including the magazines: Deer & Deer Hunting; Trapper & Predator Caller; Turkey & Turkey Hunting	Media 360
Print	Print Holdings LLC

Various assets of F+W were sold prior to the bankruptcy filing.

Magazines sold prior to bankruptcy filing
Date	Magazine	New owner
Oct 2015	World Tea News	Penton
Oct 2016	Gun Digest	Caribou Media Group
Jun 2018	Blade	Caribou Media Group
