= Fine Gardening =

- Fine Gardening Magazine
- Executive Editor: Danielle Sherry
- Categories: Lifestyle Magazine
- Frequency: Bi-monthly
- Publisher: Active Interest Media
- First issue: May/June 1988
- Country: United States
- Based in: Newtown, CT
- Language: English
- Website: FineGardening.com
- ISSN: 0896-6281

Fine Gardening is a magazine for gardening enthusiasts of all skill levels covering the basics of garden design with advice from horticulture experts and landscape professionals. The focus is more on ornamental plants and home landscaping rather than edible gardens. It is a bi-monthly publication of Active Interest Media published in the United States that accepts only gardening-related advertising. It is headquartered in Newtown, Connecticut.

== Contents ==
Feature articles

Most Fine Gardening articles are how-to or instructional in nature focusing on design, techniques, plants, or garden structure and are well illustrated. What makes Fine Gardening unique among gardening magazines is that the articles are written in the first person based on personal experience by home gardeners, horticulturists, and professional landscapers.

Other regular departments

Departments such as Super Cool Plants and Plant MD are generally written by horticulture experts. Reader-submitted content is included in departments such as

- Tips
- Over the Fence
- Garden Photo of the Day
- Garden Shed

Other regular departments include:

- Super Cool Plants
- Plant MD
- Indoor Gardening
- Regional Reports
- Captivating Combinations
- Pronunciation guide & zone map, and
- Let's Argue About Plants (based on the magazine's award-winning podcast).

== Ancillary publications ==
Fine Gardening magazine issues special interest magazine issue a few times each year on specialized topics such as:

- Container Gardening
- Outdoor Ideas and Solutions
- Design Ideas
- Plant Combinations
- Grow
- Starting from Seed

In addition, Fine Gardening publishes instructional books and DVDs.

== Awards and recognition ==
- Silver Award of Achievement for Writing – Book for Home Outside by Julie Moir Messervy (2010) Garden Writers Association
- Gold Award for Best Magazine for Plant Combinations (2008) Garden Writers Association
- Silver Award for Overall Product: Magazine (2008) Garden Writers Association
- Gold Award for Best Illustration (2007) Garden Writers Association
- Silver Award for Magazine Illustration (2007) Garden Writers Association
- Gold Award for Best Writing (2006) Garden Writers Association
- Gold Award for Best Magazine for Plant Combinations (2006) Garden Writers Association
- Two Silver Awards for Magazine Writing (2006) Garden Writers Association
- Silver Award for Cover Photography (2006) Garden Writers Association
- Bronze Award of Achievement for Magazine Writing (2005) Garden Writers Association
- Bronze Award of Achievement for Photography Portfolio (2005) Garden Writers Association
- Two Awards of Achievement for Magazine Writing (2004) Garden Writers Association
- Award of Achievement for Magazine Graphic Design (2004) Garden Writers Association
- Garden Globe of Achievement for Magazine Writing (2003) Garden Writers Association
- Garden Globe of Achievement for Cover Photography (2003) Garden Writers Association
