= Albert L. Osborn =

American politician

Albert LeRoy Osborn (September 9, 1858 – April 19, 1940) was a member of the Wisconsin State Assembly.

== Biography ==
Osborn was born on September 9, 1858, in Iola, Wisconsin. His father was a Waupaca County, Wisconsin judge. Osborn graduated from high school in Oshkosh, Wisconsin, before moving to Hurley, Wisconsin. He also served in the Wisconsin Army National Guard. In 1900, Osborn married Alice L. Wyckoff. They had two children. Osborn died at the Mayo Clinic in Rochester, Minnesota, on April 19, 1940.

== Political career ==
Osborn was a member of the Assembly in 1903. He was a Republican.
