= The Pastel Journal =

- Categories: Art
- Frequency: Bimonthly
- Publisher: Peak Media Properties
- Founded: 1999
- Company: Macanta Investments
- Country: United States
- Based in: Cincinnati, Ohio
- Language: English
- Website: www.pasteljournal.com
- ISSN: 1524-9034

The Pastel Journal is a bi-monthly magazine focused on pastel artists and pastel art. The magazine was started in 1999.

It is headquartered in Cincinnati. The magazine was published by F+W Media until 2019, when it was acquired by Macanta Investments and became part of the Peak Media Properties. As of 2006, its circulation was approximately 26,000.
