= Magazines.com =

- Industry: Retail
- Founded: 1999
- Headquarters: Franklin, Tennessee, United States
- Number of employees: 72 (2012)
- Website: https://www.magazines.com/

Magazines.com LLC is a privately held American e-commerce company based in Franklin, TN, a suburb of Nashville, Tennessee. Magazines.com retains authorizations to sell magazine subscriptions by publishers. Time Inc. is a major investor. Magazines.com has more than 7,000 magazine titles including free business-to-business magazines.

== History ==
Magazines.com was started by Jay Clarke, working alongside Time Inc., in 1999. A sports enthusiast and former banker, Clarke had previously co-founded an entrepreneurial venture called Monorail Computer Corporation, which manufactured personal computers for consumers.

Ranked #3966 in the Inc. 5000 in 2012, Magazines.com specifically looks to provide its customers with the best prices on their publications.
