= Clifford Mishler =

American numismatist

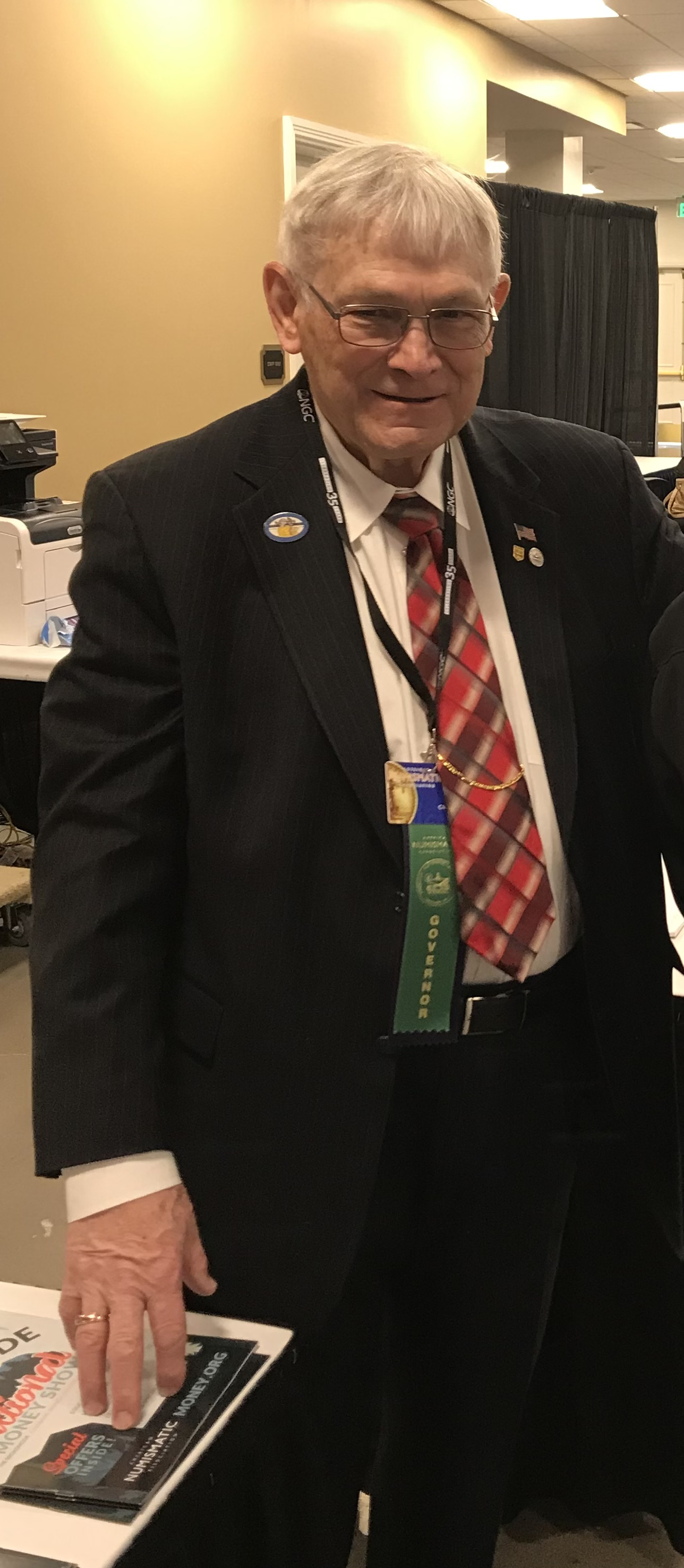
- Mishler at the 2022 National Money Show
- Born: August 11, 1939 (age 87); Vandalia, Michigan, U.S.
- Occupations: Numismatist, author
- Years active: 1963–present
- Known for: Columnist, author

Clifford Leslie Mishler (born August 11, 1939) is an American author and numismatist. He has served as president of the American Numismatic Association.

== Early life ==
Mishler was born in Vandalia, Michigan and attended Northwestern University.

== Career ==
Mishler was hired by Krause Publications in 1963 as an associate editor for Numismatic News before being promoted to full editor from 1964 to 1966. He became the publisher for all numismatic publications from 1966 to 1975, publisher for all publications from 1975 to 1988, and was named executive vice president from 1975 to 1988, senior vice president from 1988 to 1990. He was appointed president of Krause Publications effective January 1, 1991. Along with Chester L. Krause, Mishler created the "Krause-Mishler" numbering system used in the Standard Catalog of World Coins.

Prior to being hired by Krause Publications, Mishler worked as a carpenter in Vandalia from 1959 to 1962. During this time, wrote United States and Canadian Commemorative Medals and Tokens, first published in 1958, with annual updates through 1963, and issued three "Historic Artistry medals": In 1959 he issued an Alaska-Hawaii Statehood commemorative, limited to 1,939 pieces issued across eight different metals or finishes; in 1961, a Civil War Commemorative was issued with 1,000 pieces in sterling silver and another 1,000 in oxidized copper, and the following year a medal was issued that honored both John Glenn and the Wright brothers, with one thousand pieces struck in sterling silver.

Mishler was a founding member of the Token and Medal Society in 1960. He served as the organization's president from 1976-78, and President of the Numismatists of Wisconsin from 1974 to 1976. From October 1964 through 1988, Mishler was editor of the Token and Medal Society's journal. He was TAMS life member No. 1, and helped design the logo for the Society.

On September 23, 1974, Mishler was part of a group of people who inspected gold at Fort Knox.

In 1976, he wrote Coins: Questions and Answers with co-author Carl Allenbaugh, which has subsequently been re-issued several times.

Mishler was influential in the sale of Carson City Morgan dollars from the GSA hoard, and served on the United States Assay Commission in 1973. He successfully lobbied for the 40% silver Eisenhower dollars to be issued for collectors from 1971 to 1978. His efforts also helped create the Bicentennial quarter, half and dollar coins in 1975–76.

He served as president of the American Numismatic Association from 2009 to 2011. During his term, from September 2009 until August 2011, he wrote the "From Your President" column in the Association's journal, The Numismatist. He joined the Association in 1956.

He is still an active numismatic writer, writing "On The Scene" columns for Numismatic News as of 2024. These columns focus on Mishler's experiences in the hobby community, including attendance at coin shows and conventions, club meetings, and his other responsibilities.

In August 2026, Mishler celebrated his 70th anniversary as an American Numismatic Association member.

== Other work ==
Mishler spearheaded the effort to create the Chester L. Krause Legacy Park in Iola, Wisconsin which opened in October 2023. He currently serves as president of the Iola Historical Society.

== Awards ==
Mishler has received several awards including the Numismatists of Wisconsin Meritorious Service Award in 1972, Society for International Numismatics Award of Excellence in 1981, ANA Medal of Merit in 1983, Farran Zerbe Memorial Award in 1984, and Glen Smedley Memorial Award in 1991. He is a life member of the American Numismatic Association and life fellow of the American Numismatic Society. He was named Numismatist of the Year in 2002, and in 2004 he was inducted into the ANA Numismatic Hall of Fame. He also received the Burnett Anderson Memorial Award for Excellence in Numismatic Writing in 2005. In 2008, the American Numismatic Association's annual "convention theme" exhibit award was named in his honor.

In 2014, he received the Royal Canadian Numismatic Association's President's Award.

In 2021, Mishler was named one of Coin World's Most Influential People in Numismatics. That same year, he was inducted into the Society of Paper Money Collectors Hall of Fame.

== Personal life ==
Mishler was married to Sandra Rae Knutson in 1963 until her death in 1972. He married Sylvia Mae Doyle on February 27, 1976, and has three daughters.
