= Iola, Wisconsin =

- Village
- Location of Iola in Waupaca County, Wisconsin.
- Coordinates: 44°30′28″N 89°7′43″W
- Country: United States
- State: Wisconsin
- County: Waupaca

Area
  - Total: 1.84 sq mi (4.76 km^{2})
  - Land: 1.67 sq mi (4.33 km^{2})
  - Water: 0.17 sq mi (0.43 km^{2})
- Elevation: 1,037 ft (316 m)

Population (2020)
  - Total: 1,236
  - Density: 721.5/sq mi (278.58/km^{2})
- Time zone: UTC-6 (Central (CST))
  - Summer (DST): UTC-5 (CDT)
- Area codes: 715 & 534
- FIPS code: 55-37050
- GNIS feature ID: 1566947
- Website: Village of Iola

Iola is a village in Waupaca County, Wisconsin, United States. The population was 1,236 at the 2020 census. The village is bordered by the towns of Iola and Scandinavia. The community was named after a Potawatomi princess.

== Geography ==
Iola is located at 44°30′28″N 89°7′43″W (44.507951, -89.128661).

According to the United States Census Bureau, the village has a total area of 1.84 square miles (4.77 km^{2}), of which 1.67 square miles (4.33 km^{2}) is land and 0.17 square miles (0.44 km^{2}) is water.

== Demographics ==
Historical population
| Census | Pop. | Note | %± |
|---|---|---|---|
| 1880 | 194 | | — |
| 1900 | 558 | | — |
| 1910 | 850 | | 52.3% |
| 1920 | 843 | | −0.8% |
| 1930 | 763 | | −9.5% |
| 1940 | 746 | | −2.2% |
| 1950 | 867 | | 16.2% |
| 1960 | 831 | | −4.2% |
| 1970 | 900 | | 8.3% |
| 1980 | 957 | | 6.3% |
| 1990 | 1,125 | | 17.6% |
| 2000 | 1,298 | | 15.4% |
| 2010 | 1,301 | | 0.2% |
| 2020 | 1,249 | | −4.0% |
U.S. Decennial Census

=== 2010 census ===
As of the census of 2010, there were 1,301 people, 590 households, and 341 families living in the village. The population density was 779.0 inhabitants per square mile (300.8/km^{2}). There were 677 housing units at an average density of 405.4 per square mile (156.5/km^{2}). The racial makeup of the village was 98.5% White, 0.2% African American, 0.3% Native American, 0.2% Asian, 0.2% of other races, and 0.7% of two or more races. Hispanic or Latino of any race were 1.2% of the population.

There were 590 households, of which 23.7% had children under the age of 18 living with them, 41.7% were married couples living together, 12.2% had a female householder with no husband present, 3.9% had a male householder with no wife present, and 42.2% were non-families. 37.6% of all households were made up of individuals, and 19.5% had someone living alone who was 65 years of age or older. The average household size was 2.12 and the average family size was 2.77.

The median age in the village was 46.8 years. 19.8% of residents were under the age of 18; 5.5% were between the ages of 18 and 24; 22.1% were from 25 to 44; 25.9% were from 45 to 64; and 26.6% were 65 years of age or older. The gender makeup of the village was 46.3% male and 53.7% female.

=== 2000 census ===
As of the census of 2000, there were 1,298 people, 567 households, and 329 families living in the village. The population density was 757.1 people per square mile (293.1/km^{2}). There were 618 housing units at an average density of 360.5 per square mile (139.5/km^{2}). The racial makeup of the village was 98.07% White, 0.23% Black or African American, 0.08% Native American, 0.23% Asian, 0.23% of other races, and 1.16% of two or more races. 1.31% of the population were Hispanic or Latino of any race.

There were 567 households, out of which 25.2% had children under the age of 18 living with them, 45.9% were married couples living together, 9.5% had a female householder with no husband present, and 41.8% were non-families. 36.5% of all households were made up of individuals, and 17.8% had someone living alone who was 65 years of age or older. The average household size was 2.18 and the average family size was 2.87.

In the village, the population was spread out, with 22.7% under the age of 18, 5.1% from 18 to 24, 25.6% from 25 to 44, 21.2% from 45 to 64, and 25.5% who were 65 years of age or older. The median age was 42 years. For every 100 females, there were 82.8 males. For every 100 females age 18 and over, there were 78.3 males.

The median income for a household in the village was $32,829, and the median income for a family was $45,859. Males had a median income of $32,424 versus $22,031 for females. The per capita income for the village was $17,778. About 4.0% of families and 6.5% of the population were below the poverty line, including 7.0% of those under age 18 and 8.5% of those age 65 or over.

== Transportation ==
| WIS 49 Northbound to WIS 29 Southbound, to Waupaca. |
| WIS 161 travels east to Bear Creek via WIS 22, and west to Amherst. |

== Economy ==
Iola hosts the annual Iola Car Show with 130,000 attendees, 2,500 show cars, and 4,000 swap spaces.

For years Iola was the home of Krause Publications, a company that has published books for numismatics and other hobbies since March 1972. The Sports Collectors Digest is also published in Iola. Krause Publications was purchased by F + W Publications, which continued to operate it in Iola under the F + W name until the spring of 2018, when F + W Publications moved to Stevens Point, Wis.

Iola has restaurants and bars, manufacturers, beauty and arts stores, and professional services. The community is notable as a haven for outdoors enthusiasts.

== Education ==
The Iola-Scandinavia School District serves the area. Iola has a K-6 elementary school, a 7-8 middle school and 9-12 high school. The high school enrolled 197 students in the 2023-24 school year. 22.4% of students participate in either dual-college and high school enrollment programs or trade-based learning.

== Notable people ==
The following notable people are from or have been associated with Iola, Wisconsin.

=== Athletes and sports personnel ===
- Dave Krieg, National Football League quarterback
- Austen Lane, NFL defensive end and UFC heavyweight fighter
- Tim Polasek, North Dakota State University head football coach
- Kristian Welch, NFL linebacker

=== Politicians ===
- Joseph Leean, Wisconsin State Senator
- Albert L. Osborn, Wisconsin State Representative
- Barney S. Peterson, Wisconsin State Representative
- Herman J. Severson, Wisconsin State Senator and jurist

=== Fulbright Fellows ===
- Paul G. Hoel, statistician and author

=== Business and media ===
- Chester L. Krause, founder of Krause Publications
- John Jackson Miller, New York Times Best Seller List author
- Clifford Mishler, numismatist and author, former American Numismatic Association President
- Clifford Thompson, world’s tallest lawyer and the tallest actor to appear in a Hollywood film
- Stephen Thompson, NPR host and co-creator of Tiny Desk Concerts series
