= Taunton Press =

Magazine and book publisher

- Parent company: Abrams Books
- Founded: 1975
- Founder: Paul and Jan Roman
- Country of origin: United States
- Headquarters location: Newtown and Naugatuck, Connecticut
- Distribution: Ingram Publisher Services (books)
- Key people: Renee Jordan (President/CEO)
- Publication types: Magazines, Books, Digital Media
- Official website: www.taunton.com

Taunton Press is a publisher of books for the hobbyist and building trades based in Newtown, Connecticut. It was established in 1975 by Paul Roman and his wife Jan.

On December 3, 2023, Active Interest Media acquired The Taunton Press. Active Interest Media sold the Taunton Books imprint portion of the business to Abrams Books in May 2024.

== Publications and products ==
Periodicals previously published by Taunton Press include:

- Fine Woodworking
- Fine Homebuilding
- Fine Gardening
- Threads
- Kitchen Garden (retired)
- CraftStylish (retired)
- Inspired House (retired)

In addition to traditional print media products, Taunton Press maintained a number of online resources and communities including GreenBuildingAdvisor.com.

Taunton Press publishes books on woodworking, home building, home design, cooking, gardening and crafts. Popular publications have included Sarah Susanka's Not So Big home design series, New York Times Bestseller The Food You Crave by Ellie Krieger, The Crocheted Prayer Shawl Companion by Janet Bristow and Victoria A. Cole-Galo, Graphic Guide to Frame Construction by Robert Thallon, and Turning Wood with Richard Raffan and Cooking Allergy-Free by Jenna Short. Taunton Press has published for some of the most well-known names in their specialities, such as Tage Frid Teaches Woodworking and the Sam Maloof DVD.
