= Active Interest Media =

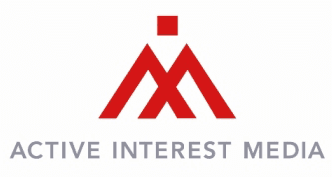
- Type: Private
- Industry: publishing
- Founded: 2003
- Founder: Wind Point Partners, Efrem Zimbalist
- Headquarters: Grand Avenue, Des Moines,
- Key people: Andy Clurman (CEO); Adam Smith (COO and CFO)
- Owner: B&W Communications
- Number of employees: 400
- Website: www.aimmedia.com

Active Interest Media (AIM) is a publisher specializing in "niche enthusiast magazines" (i.e. magazines targeted at hobbyists).

== History ==
The company was formed in 2003 by private-equity investment firm Wind Point Partners by the acquisition of Sabot Publishing, a "special interest" publisher based in Richmond, VA which had been established in 1999 by James Causey and Colonnade Capital. In July 2017, the company announced that it had acquired the United States Team Roping Championships and the TRIAD Classification Agency. In 2020, AIM sold these properties in conjunction with the sale of many of its largest divisions to Pocket Outdoor Media.

== Overview ==
Active Interest Media publications are organized in three "groups", the Collectibles group (antiques, currency collecting, sports, military, and collectable cars, the Home Arts group (woodworking, gardening, cooking, and sewing), and the Home Building Group (home building, renovation, architectural styles, interior design etc.); and Writer's Digest.

On 7 November 2012, PixelMags Inc. announced that they had reached an agreement with Active Interest Media to distribute magazine content digitally.

In March 2017, Active Interest Media sold its Yachting Promotions Inc. division to Informa for $133 million. The sale included the Fort Lauderdale International Boat Show, Yachts Miami Beach, the Palm Beach International Boat Show, the St. Petersburg Power and Sailboat Show, and the Suncoast Boat Show.

On 30 April 2013, Active Interest Media purchased the SKI and Skiing magazines, Warren Miller Entertainment, and NASTAR from the Bonnier Mountain Group. In 2015, Active Interest Media purchased August Home Publishing, publisher of Woodsmith magazine. Chairman and Chief Executive Officer is Efrem Zimbalist III (the son of Efrem Zimbalist, Jr.), formerly of Times Mirror Magazines, a subsidiary of Times Mirror.

In 2019, Active Interest Media acquired the “collectibles” magazines from F+W Media, which includes Coins, Numismatic News, Writer’s Digest, Popular Woodworking, and Horticulture.

In 2020, Active Interest Media sold off divisions including "several of its largest publications" to Pocket Outdoor Media of Boulder, Colorado (which was renamed to Outside Inc. the following year); the sale included the magazines Backpacker, Better Nutrition, Clean Eating, Climbing, Muscle & Performance, NatuRx, Oxygen, SKI, Vegetarian Times, and Yoga Journal, as well as the digital outlet SNEWS and the action sports film studio Warren Miller Entertainment.

In 2021, Wind Point sold AIM to B&W Communications, a company founded by CEO Andy Clurman. In 2021, Active Interest Media sold its Equine Network properties to Growth Catalyst Partners.

On December 3, 2023, Active Interest Media acquired The Taunton Press, publisher of Fine Woodworking, Fine Homebuilding, Green Building Advisor, Threads Magazine, and Fine Gardening.

In December 2024, the Marine group (sailing, boating, fishing, etc..) was sold to Firecrown Media.
