= Bill Schanes =

American publishing executive

William D. Schanes (born 1958) is an American publishing executive, active for many years in the comic book industry. One of the founders of Pacific Comics, Schanes later worked for many years for Diamond Comic Distributors.

== Career ==
Bill and his brother Steve Schanes co-founded Pacific Comics in 1971. Pacific Comics was an early pioneer in the direct market method of selling comic books, as well as a publisher in its own right (beginning in 1981) which actively promoted creator-owned properties. At Pacific, Bill Schanes "took on the nuts-and-bolts aspects of business and accounting." Pacific collapsed in 1984.

Schanes joined Steve Geppi's Diamond Comic Distributors company in 1985, rising to the position of Vice President for Purchasing. After 28 years with Diamond, Schanes departed the company in April 2013.

CEO Steve Geppi remarked at the time of Schanes' departure:

As a co-founder of Pacific Comics in 1971, Bill already had over a dozen years of experience in comic retailing, distribution and publishing when he came to work for me in 1985. Since then, Bill’s vision, creativity and dedication have contributed greatly not just to Diamond’s success, but to the success of our industry as a whole. I’m extremely grateful to Bill for all of his contributions ....

== Controversy ==
In 1987, Puma Blues publisher Dave Sim fell into dispute with Diamond over Sim's decision not to use Diamond to distribute the Cerebus graphic novel High Society. As a result, Schanes, in his role as National Account Representative, informed Sim: "If it is your intention to pick and choose which products you want distributors to carry, it should be our privilege to choose what we wish to distribute. Therefore, it is our feeling we should no longer carry and promote Puma Blues." At that time, Diamond distributed an estimated 33% of the series' print run. Puma Blues creators Stephen Murphy and Michael Zulli responded with an open letter titled "Not Fade Away," stating their intent to continue with or without Diamond's support.

Later in 1988, Diamond backed down and agreed to distribute The Puma Blues, but the incident was one of the primary factors leading to Sim's participation in developing the Creator's Bill of Rights.

== Awards ==
- Schanes was the recipient of an Inkpot Award, presented at San Diego Comic-Con in 1987.
