= Steve Geppi =

Comic book publisher

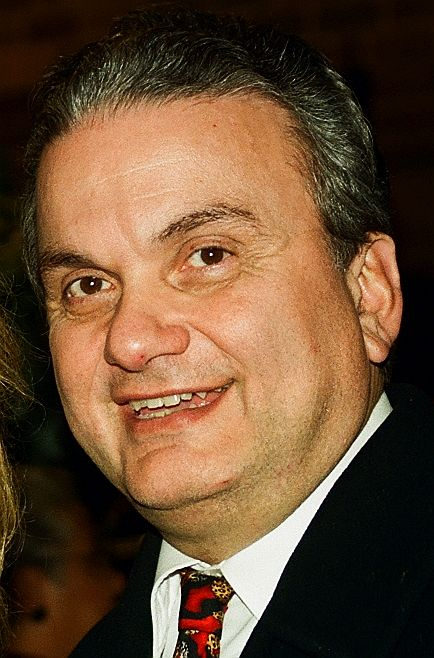
- Geppi in 2000
- Born: Stephen Andrew Geppi; January 24, 1950 (age 76) Little Italy, Baltimore, Maryland
- Areas: Distributor, publisher
- Notable works: Diamond Distribution; Gemstone Publishing

Stephen A. Geppi (born January 24, 1950) is an American comic book distributor, publisher and former comic store owner. Having established an early chain of comic shops in Baltimore in the mid-late 1970s, he is best known for his distributing business. Geppi founded Diamond Comic Distributors, the largest comic direct distribution service in 1982, and has served as the company's head to the present. Diamond Distribution became the successor to direct market pioneer Phil Seuling's distribution dream when Geppi took over New Media/Irjax's warehouses in 1982. He further bought out early-distributor Bud Plant in 1988, and main rival Capital City in 1996 to assume a near-monopoly on comics distribution, including exclusivity deals with the major comic book publishers.

Geppi became part owner of the Baltimore Orioles in 1993, and in 1994 purchased Baltimore magazine. He is president and publisher of Gemstone Publishing Inc., through which he publishes Russ Cochran's EC Comics reprints, Disney comics and Blue Book price guide The Overstreet Comic Book Price Guide.

In 1995, he founded Diamond International Galleries, which acquired Hake's Americana & Collectibles auction house (2004), and in 2005, Pennsylvania-based Morphy Auctions. In 2006, Geppi founded Geppi's Entertainment Museum in Baltimore.

== Biography ==
=== Early life and career ===
Steve Geppi was born on January 24, 1950, in Little Italy, Baltimore and completed the 8th grade before leaving school. Geppi's "first job was handling the comics for a local store," where the nine-year-old avidly read comics including "his favorite Archie comics" and others. Ever the entrepreneur, Geppi "asked to be paid in comics [because]... [h]e could sell them off to other kids and make a better buck." By 1960, Geppi was "doing tax returns for his neighbors," and later also "handled football pools."

Having left school to support his mother, between 1964 and 1969, he undertook a number of "manual-labor jobs," while "dodging truant officers." He "enrolled in vocational school," but did not feel challenged – later recalling that "I had missed 45 days at the half, and I was on the honor roll" – and again dropped out. Later he worked for Lester White's Detecto Electronics "install[ing] burglar alarms and doorbells," before joining the U.S. Postal Service as a letter carrier. Starting aged 19 with "the crap jobs," (loading trucks and substituting for other carriers), Geppi was "starting a family... [and] needed... solid, steady work, something with a future." A "few years" after taking the carrier exam, he was assigned a flat "route in suburban Maryland," while "[t]he Postal Service kept raising salaries [and] Geppi's pay tripled in five years," allowing him to move "his growing family out to the suburbs." In the early seventies Geppi was a member of the Jehovah's Witnesses and conducted many free home bible studies. Whether or not he is still affiliated with this organization is not known.

Geppi and family vacationed every summer in Wildwood, New Jersey. In the summer of 1972, his nephew (Georgie Kues) was "reading an old Batman comic book" in the rain, and Geppi found that "reading that Batman brought [back his childhood memories of comics]... He still loved comics [and] figured there were a lot of guys who would feel the same way." Buying "a batch of old comics from a woman on his mail route," he was soon "spending weekends at comic shows, buying and trading with other fans." After "setting up at comic book conventions as a part-time dealer," he ultimately realised that he could make more money that way than at his job with the postal services.

=== Career in comics ===
In 1974, Geppi announced his intention to quit his job and "open a comic book store." Geppi recalls that his colleagues "all laughed their heads off," while The Journal of Antiques and Collectibles quoted him as saying:

"I remember when I left the Post Office, some of the people there said, 'See you in September,' since they were so sure I'd be back,” he said. But Geppi never returned to the postal job."

Already "making more money with the comics than as a mailman," he opened his first Geppi's Comic World comic store "in a hole under a TV repair shop" in Baltimore, and – while personally specialising in "older, collectible comics," – "began carrying new comics, chiefly as a means of attracting regular customers to the store each week." Geppi "stocked his store with collections he found through the classifieds, traveling the countryside in his beat-up blue Ford van." One of "the first specialty comic retailers in Maryland," Geppi built his business as the comics industry grew. Geppi recalls

"I would snowball one deal into another... [i]f I made $5,000 on a deal and another deal came up for $5,000, I would empty the bank account. I would take the risk."

By 1981/82 he had four stores, "including a tourist development in Harborplace, showplace of a reviving Maryland." Already "doing a little informal distributing... for smaller retailers," Geppi found himself "one of the biggest accounts" for New Media/Irjax. When his distributor "relocated to Florida, he asked Geppi to service more accounts for a bigger discount." One of the "last loyal customers" when New Media began having fiscal difficulties, Geppi made a deal: "[t]he owner was going into retail," so Geppi agreed to provide Schuster with "free books for a period of time in return for his account list," buying parts of the company, and founding Diamond Comic Distribution.

In June 1994, Success magazine featured Geppi on its cover, celebrating his "$250 Million Empire," and highlighting his co-ownership of the Baltimore Orioles.

== Diamond Comic Distributors ==
=== Fore-runners ===
After Phil Seuling established the direct market c.1972, he maintained a virtual (if ill-run) monopoly on comics distribution until a lawsuit brought by New Media/Irjax in 1978. Irjax, "a paper distribution company formed by Hal Schuster... his father, Irwin, and his brother, Jack" achieved "a sizeable chunk of the direct-distribution market," but ultimately "filed for Chapter Seven bankruptcy in early 1982."

=== Foundation ===
Described by Mile High Comics' Chuck Rozanski as "brilliant," Steve Geppi had been a subdistributor for Hal Schuster in the late 1970s. In what Rozanski describes as an "incredibly risky and gutsy move," Geppi took over New Media/Irjax's "office and warehouse space" and, recalled Rozanski, had to "sort out the good customers from the bad overnight" negotiating with creditors to continue Schuster's distribution business as Diamond Comic Distribution. Almost overnight, noted Rozanski, "[h]e went from being a retailer in Baltimore to having warehouses all over the place." Geppi himself, according to Mike Friedrich "was someone whose work you could trust, who had a good reputation for honesty in the field [as a collector, retailer and distributor]."

Geppi named his company 'Diamond' "after the imprint Marvel Comics used on non-returnable comics," and although the "publisher discontinued the symbol" months later, the name remained. "Diamond grew an average of 40 percent a year," as comics retail took off. Many fans "with little experience" started rival companies only to "find they were in over their heads," allowing Geppi to "[buy] out the smart ones or pick... up the pieces after the stupid ones went out of business," according to Geppi employee Mark Herr. Geppi was aided in his efforts by the publishers themselves. In the early 1980s, Marvel and DC Comics groups provided trade terms favorable for larger distributors and those with efficient freight systems, effectively "play[ing] into the hands of the major distributors such as Capital and Diamond," and hastening the demise of smaller distributors.

In 1983, he hired an accounting firm, and in 1985 hired "no-nonsense CPA," Chuck Parker "as Diamond's first controller." Herr notes that this move was Geppi's "best decision," as Parker "cares nothing about the comics. To him, it's dollars and cents." Parker describes his role as "smooth[ing] the emotion out of some decisions. Steve [Geppi] is a visionary and a risk-taker... and I tend to be more conservative."

=== Expansion ===
After starting his business through buying New Media/Irjax's warehouses and offices in 1982, Geppi's distribution company has bought out many other distribution companies since. Most notably, Geppi bought up that of early mail order distributor Bud Plant, who had himself "bought out Charlie Abarr in the early 1980s." Plant had, since 1970, been selling underground comics, a field which Geppi and fellow-distributor Buddy Saunders had tended to steer clear of. After making $19 million in sales in 1987, Geppi's Diamond bought West Coast distributor Plant's business in 1988 "and went national" thereby assuming control of "40 percent of the direct-sales market." (Diamond and Capital City had control of at least 70% between them.)

By 1994, Diamond had "27 warehouses in the U.S., Canada, and the U.K., employ[ing] between 750 and 900 people," owned its own trucking line and controlled 45% of the market, making $222 million in sales. In 1995, Marvel Comics challenged Diamond and main rival Capital City Distribution by buying the third distributor – Heroes World – and distributing its titles in-house. Diamond reacted by outbidding Capital City for exclusive deals with Marvel's main rivals DC Comics, as well as Dark Horse and Image. Capital City's response saw it sign exclusive deals with Kitchen Sink Press and Viz Comics, but a year later faced the choice between bankruptcy and selling up. Diamond bought Capital City in 1996, assuming near-control of the comics distribution system. When Marvel's Heroes World endeavour failed, Diamond also forged an exclusive deal with Marvel – giving the company its own section of comics catalog Previews (not least because the DC/Dark Horse/Image deal gave contractual prominence to those companies) – making "Geppi... the sole king of comics industry distribution in the summer of 1996."

=== Criticism ===
In 1983, Geppi was criticised for taking exception to certain adult-themed titles and scenes, effectively causing the cancellation of a series called "Void Indigo" for its excessive violence. Later in 1987, Geppi responded to "a graphic childbirth scene in Miracleman #9 (written by Alan Moore), Geppi wrote to retailers that:

"Diamond values its retailers too much to take chances on such a dangerous situation... We are not censors. We no more want someone deciding for us than you do. We cannot, however, stand by and watch the marketplace become a dumping ground for every sort of graphic fantasy that someone wants to live out. We have an industry to protect; we have leases to abide by; we have a community image to maintain."

Geppi lost customers with this approach, however, "and eventually backed down." He recalls compromising, and accepting "that as a distributor, I owed the retailers the product they wanted."

Geppi's position in the comics industry, in which Diamond was "the sole source of most new comics products to comics specialty shops," ultimately saw the company become the subject of "an investigation by the U.S. Justice department for possible antitrust violations." The investigation was dropped in November 2000, "with no action deemed necessary."

=== Affiliations ===
Diamond Comic Distribution, in addition to having cornered the American comics distribution market, also includes a number of subsidiary and affiliated companies. UK and European comics distribution is served by Diamond UK, based in London, England. Alliance Game Distributors, Inc. distributes Role-playing games, "Collectible Card Games, Miniature Games, Anime, Board Games," and other periphery elements for gamers. Alliance also publishes Game Trade Magazine.

In 2002, Diamond consolidated its book trade into Diamond Book Distributors, marketing comics-related books and trade paperbacks to bookstores including "Barnes & Noble, Ingram, Baker & Taylor, WaldenBooks, Amazon.com [and] Borders.

=== Publications ===
Diamond's monthly comics retail catalog, Previews, has been produced by Diamond for over twenty years for store owners to order products from. It is additionally available for sale to customers to facilitate personal orders. Comics publishers vie for space within the publication's pages, with Dark Horse Comics, DC Comics, IDW Publishing, and Image Comics (four of the top five publishers) taking precedence. Marvel Comics has its own separate section of Previews available separately, for contractual reasons.

Diamond also publishes (through Gemstone and Diamond International Galleries) a weekly e-newsletter dealing with collectibles, called Scoop.

== Diamond International Galleries ==
In 1995, Geppi "opened Diamond International Galleries," a showplace for comics and collectibles, part of Geppi's attempts to "see... collectibles attain serious respect." Nine years later, Diamond International Galleries purchased "one of the country’s first, and most respected, collectibles auction houses: Hake's Americana & Collectibles." In 2005, Geppi added the "Denver, Pennsylvania-based Morphy Auctions" to his growing stable of parts of the collectibles market, which already included publishing the main comics price guide: The Overstreet Comic Book Price Guide.

Geppi describes his International Galleries as being "at the heart of many significant opportunities to preserve, promote and present historical comic character collectibles," an endeavor that led to his establishing Geppi's Entertainment Museum. Geppi's galleries showcase much of his private collection, including comics, movie posters, toys, original artwork by individuals including "Carl Barks, Gustav Tengren (sic), Alex Ross, Murphy Anderson, Joe Shuster, Joe Simon and Charles Schulz."

Through this, Geppi has assisted "in such projects as DC's Archive series," as well as hosting industry events.

=== Geppi's Entertainment Museum ===
Geppi's Entertainment Museum was a museum in Baltimore, Maryland, tracing the history of pop culture in American over the last four hundred years. Its collections included newspapers, magazines, comic books, movies, television, radio and video game memorabilia, including comic books, movie posters, toys, buttons, badges, cereal boxes, trading cards, dolls and figurines. The majority of the exhibits came from Geppi's private collection. Geppi's daughter Melissa "Missy" Geppi-Bowersox became the executive vice-president of the museum in 2007, after Wendy Kelman left the museum on August 31, 2007, to start her own tourism consulting firm.

In May 2018, Geppi announced that Geppi Entertainment Museum would be closing after Sunday, June 3, 2018. Much of the material was donated to the United States Library of Congress.

== Publishing ==
In 1994, Geppi purchased Baltimore magazine, "a 50,000 circulation monthly and one of the nation's oldest regional publications."

=== Gemstone Publishing ===
Geppi's publishing ventures in the field of comics saw him form Gemstone Publishing Inc., which was formed in large part from other purchases. In 1992, Geppi and Diamond bought Ernst Gerber Publishing (publisher-author of the Photo-Journal Guide to Comics). E. Gerber Products, LLC is a Diamond-affiliated company started by Gerber in 1977 which sells Mylar bags as well as "acid-free boxes and acid-free backing boards" for comics collectors to store their collection in. In 1993, Geppi bought Russ Cochran Publishing. Long-term EC Comics fan Cochran auctioned Bill Gaines' personal file copies of EC publications, as well as most pages of original EC artwork (which, almost uniquely, Gaines had maintained ownership and possession of), before being granted the reprint rights to the EC back catalog itself. Geppi included Cochran's publications – and Cochran himself – under his new imprint, Gemstone Publishing.

In 1994, Geppi bought Overstreet Publishing, taking up the publishing reins of official-Blue Book priceguide The Overstreet Comic Book Price Guide, and other related publications, bringing them under the Gemstone imprint. Geppi's publishing activities with Gemstone Publishing consist primarily of reprints of classic titles and artworks, as well as publications (including professional fanzines "pro-zines") focusing heavily on the history of the comics medium. Many Gemstone publications revolve around Comic Book Marketplace-editor and EC-shepherd Russ Cochran.

==== EC Comics reprints ====
Cochran, like Geppi, was a particular fan of Carl Barks' Disney comics, and had previously published EC reprints in association with Disney-reprinter Gladstone Publishing. In the early 1990s, Geppi's Gemstone embarked on a full series of reprints of classic EC titles, starting with new reprints of the Cochran/Gladstone-reprints of The Haunt of Fear, The Vault of Horror and Weird Science (all 1992). Gemstone also republished (in single issue and 'annual' – four issues per 'annual' – format) EC's 'New Trend' and 'New Direction' titles between 1992 and 2000.

In 2005, Gemstone added to Cochran's earlier-published oversize, hardback, black & white slip-cased "The Complete EC Library" collections with the complete Picto-Fiction collection, comprising the EC comics: Confessions Illustrated, Crime Illustrated, Shock Illustrated and Terror Illustrated, along with "18 previously unseen stories, never published before".

In 2006, Gemstone began producing a more durable and luxurious series of hardback reprint collections; the EC Archives – similar to the DC Archives and Marvel Masterworks volumes – which reprint in full-color hardback ('archival') format sequential compilations of the EC titles. Designed by art director/designer Michael Kronenberg, a number of volumes have been released, with the entirety of the "New Trend" and "New Direction" planned for eventual release. These EC Archives volumes have drawn praise for their quality, and feature introductions by such notable EC fans as George Lucas, Steven Spielberg, Joe Dante and Paul Levitz, et al.

==== Disney comics ====
In December 2002, it was announced that "Gemstone Publishing had signed the license to publishing Disney comics in North America," with ex-Gladstone Publishing editor-in-chief John Clark joining Gemstone in the same position over its Disney line. Launched with a title for Free Comic Book Day 2003, the line started soon after with Walt Disney's Comics and Stories and Walt Disney's Uncle Scrooge, both described by Clark as "monthly 64-page prestige-format books at $6.95, which is the same price they were when last produced, in 1998." Other titles followed, although the status of the remaining Disney titles is unknown as of December 2008.

==== Overstreet Comic Book Price Guide ====
The (Official) Overstreet Comic Book Price Guide, first published by Robert M. Overstreet in 1970 as one of the earliest authorities on American comic book industry grading and collection values. Overstreet sold his company to Gemstone in 1994, but continued to "serve as author and/or publisher of Geppi's Entertainment Publishing & Auctions' line of books." Publication of the Price Guide was taken over by Gemstone in 1998, Gemstone took over publication, and the twenty-eighth edition to the present have been (co-)published by Geppi's Gemstone publications. The guides 39th edition was published by Gemstone Publishing in 2009.

Overstreet also produced a variety of smaller publications updating his yearly guides on a to-monthly schedule. The most recent of these – Overstreet's Comic Price Review – began publication from Gemstone in July 2003, and was a monthly publication designed to update the yearly price guide more regularly, as well as provide articles, analysis and various lists of comics prices.

Gemstone published more than a hundred issues of the magazine Comic Book Marketplace, a monthly magazine for comics fans focusing heavily on the Golden and Silver ages, while more popular magazines (such as Wizard) skew more recent in focus.

==== Future ====
In early 2009, the future of Gemstone Publishing was unclear, after reports of unpaid printing bills, particularly from the EC Archives. In April, Geppi responded to the uncertainty, noting that while there had been "a reduction in staff at Gemstone," such moves did "not [signal] the end of Gemstone Publishing." Geppi hinted at "new developments" for the Overstreet Price Guide in 2010, and stated that while "no final decision has been made regarding The EC Archives or our comic books featuring Disney's standard characters... it seems certain that both lines will continue in some form."

== Other work ==
In February 1993, he was profiled for "a local business magazine," and the article ultimately caught the attention of Ernst & Young. Geppi was thus awarded the regional 'Entrepreneur of the Year' award for 1993. Celebrating his win at the Camden Club, Geppi was introduced to "prominent local attorney" Peter Angelos, who had also "[grown] up in one of Baltimore's ethnic neighborhoods," and the two had mutual friends.

=== Baseball ===
Having been an "avid baseball fan, who as a youngster dreamed of playing professional ball," "[d]uring Diamond’s period of early growth, Geppi... was quoted as saying he dreamed of owning his hometown Baltimore Orioles." In 1993, Angelos was "assembling a group" to do just that, and thus helped Geppi "[realize] his lifelong dream," when Geppi joined the group. The group "paid $173 million for the team," and Geppi was "the third-largest investor" behind Angelos and novelist Tom Clancy. Geppi "attends almost every Orioles' home game."

=== Charity work ===
As well as his business interests, Geppi holds – or has held – positions on the board of "a number of local charitable organizations." Among them are "[the] Babe Ruth Museum, Baltimore Reads, Baltimore Symphony Orchestra, Cystic Fibrosis Foundation, Grant-A-Wish Foundation, House with a Heart, International Museum of Cartoon Art, National Aquarium in Baltimore, Pathfinders, Port Discovery – The Children's Museum, U.S.S. Constellation Foundation, United Way of Central Maryland and the University of Maryland, College Park Foundation."

== Personal life ==
In 1998 Geppi was described in Businessweek as having been the "[c]ompanion of Mindy Stout for eight years, with [at the time] one daughter." Geppi also has a son with Mindy. In addition, Geppi has "four children from a previous marriage and [in 1998] two grandchildren."

== See also ==
- Bill Schanes
