= Big Rapids Distribution =

Distributor for the underground press

- Formerly: Keep On Truckin' Coop
- Company type: Cooperative
- Industry: Distributor
- Founded: 1970; 56 years ago in Detroit, Michigan, U.S.
- Defunct: 1980; 46 years ago
- Fate: Bankruptcy
- Headquarters: Detroit, and Big Rapids, Michigan, United States
- Area served: Central and southern Michigan
- Key people: Jim Kennedy (1947–2008) (President), Michael John, Gary o'Gorman, Bruce Montrose, Pete Kwant, Dave Levison, John and Cathy Joyce, Lee Ann Kennedy, Carol John, David Katz, John Church, Debbie Brentz, Sharon Hays, Richard Shackleford
- Services: Distribution of underground newspapers, radical literature, comic books/underground comix
- Subsidiaries: Donohue Brothers; The Comic Distributor; Isis News; Nova; Well News Co.; Wisconsin Independent News Distributors

Big Rapids Distribution was a Detroit-based distributor focusing on underground newspapers, radical literature, and underground comix. They were responsible for the unusually good coverage that underground comix and underground papers got in the Michigan area in the early 1970s, when they could be found in most full-service newsstands there. At its height, shortly before it went bankrupt in 1980, Big Rapids was functioning as an alternative independent distributor in the central and southern Michigan areas, selling a full line of magazines and paperbacks, as well as mainstream comics.

== Services ==
Among the periodicals distributed by Big Rapids were the Berkeley Barb, Fifth Estate, Creem, Rolling Stone, and High Times, in addition to a plethora of underground comix.

== History ==
=== Origins ===
Big Rapids was founded as a Detroit-area cooperative circa 1970 as the Keep On Truckin' Coop. They eventually changed their name when they moved their headquarters to Big Rapids, Michigan, but retained their co-op structure. Jim Kennedy, Big Rapids' "first-among-equals", described the company as an "alternative independent distributor".

=== Rise to prominence ===
Big Rapids' entry into mainstream comics distribution came in early 1975, when Donahoe Brothers Inc. of Ann Arbor went under and Big Rapids purchased its assets. Up to that point, Big Rapids had bought its mainstream comics from Donohoe Brothers.

Moving their headquarters back to Detroit, Big Rapids was aggressive, often taking over the businesses of customers who ran up large debts. The 1978 lawsuit brought by East Coast distributor Irjax Enterprises — against Sea Gate Distributors and all the major comics publishers — opened up the distribution market, enabling Big Rapids to expand even further. At its height, Big Rapids was actually functioning as an alternative independent distributor in the Detroit and central and southern Michigan areas, selling a full line of magazines and paperbacks, as well as comics.

==== Acquisitions ====
Distributors acquired by Big Rapids:

- The Comic Distributor — run by Jim Friel, Big Rapids called in Friel's debt in 1979 and he became an employee for a year. The name "The Comic Distributor" was later taken by Mark Hylton of Comic Carnival.
- Isis News (Minneapolis, Minnesota)
- Nova (Los Angeles, California)
- Well News Co. (Columbus, Ohio) — their personnel became the nucleus of an early Capital City Distribution branch.
- Wisconsin Independent News Distributors (WIND) — run by Milton Griepp and John Davis, who later founded Capital City Distribution.

=== Bankruptcy and dissolution ===
In 1980, despite being the largest of many distributors in the direct market, Big Rapids went bankrupt and their assets were liquidated.

There was a scramble to fill the void; a couple of new companies that grew briefly from the wreckage lasted only briefly — Comic Kingdom (Bob Hellems' company in Detroit) and Common Ground Distributors (Robert Beerbohm's in the San Francisco Bay Area). Most of the pieces were picked up by the brand-new Capital City Distribution or by New Media Distribution.
