= Heroes World Distribution =

Defunct American comic book distributor

Heroes World Distribution Co.
- Formerly: Superhero Enterprises
- Type: Comic book retailer and distributor
- Industry: Comics
- Founded: 1975; 51 years ago in Randolph, New Jersey
- Founder: Ivan Snyder
- Defunct: 1997; 29 years ago
- Fate: Business failure
- Headquarters: Morristown, New Jersey
- Parent: Marvel Comics (1994-1997)

Heroes World Distribution Co., originally named Superhero Enterprises, was an American comic book distributor. It was founded by Ivan Snyder, active from 1975 to 1997, during the growth and consolidation of the direct market. Heroes World was acquired by Marvel Comics in late 1994 to act as the publisher's sole distributor. This ill-fated move, combined with other marketplace factors of the time, resulted in the financial failure of many other comics distributors and retailers and the near collapse of the entire North American comic book market.

== History ==
=== Origins ===
In the early 1970s, Ivan Snyder was head of licensing in Marvel Comics Group's merchandising department. In this role, he was in charge of selling various Marvel licensed products via mail order. After a change in management in the mid-1970s, Marvel discontinued the mail order service, and Snyder purchased the business in 1975, renaming it Superhero Enterprises. Initially running the business out his basement, Snyder shortly thereafter moved into a storefront in Morristown, New Jersey, with a catalog showroom store format. A second store was opened in a Livingston shopping mall, with DC Comics products added to their product mix.

When the former Mego Corporation trademark "Superhero" was purchased by Marvel and DC, Superheroes Enterprise was forced to change its name to Heroes World. By 1982, Heroes World's retail chain had expanded to 12 locations, while it continued its mail order distribution business. The Heroes World catalog was produced in conjunction with the Dover, New Jersey–based Joe Kubert School of Cartoon and Graphic Art.

=== Acquisition by Marvel ===
By late 1994, Heroes World was North America's third largest comics distributor (behind Diamond Comics Distributors and Capital City Distribution). On December 28, Heroes World was bought by Marvel Comics to act as the company's exclusive distributor, thus reducing other distributors' market share by more than a third. The change took effect with books shipped in July 1995. As industry veteran Chuck Rozanski noted:

Without Marvel comics to distribute, all of the surviving direct market comics distributors suddenly found their overall sales volume reduced by 35%-40% ... while their operating costs remained constant. In a business where even a single point of discount or volume could translate into huge differences in earnings, these massive losses in sales volume were simply not sustainable. Steve Geppi, owner of Diamond Comic Distributors, responded to this threat to the survival of his business by entering into negotiations to become the exclusive distributor for all the other comics publishers. ... While Steve was begging all the comics publishers to switch all of their distribution business exclusively over to his company, John Davis and Milton Griepp of Capital City were making the same pleas on the part of their organization.

The ripple effect resulted in the survival of only one other major North American distributor, Diamond.

Heroes World's new role as Marvel's exclusive distributor was a failure from the beginning. Lacking the infrastructure to handle Marvel's huge weekly orders resulted in extensive shipment and billing mistakes, errors which caused great consternation among the thousands of comics specialty shops affected. Rozanski wrote:

... the Heroes World management team failed miserably in the PR war to win the hearts and minds of comics retailers. In fact, rather than win over any converts to Marvel, the hassle of having to place two new comics orders each month (sometimes at a lower overall discount), plus paying freight costs on Heroes World shipments, pushed many comics retailers to the brink of closing their stores.

These factors, combined with the collapse of the comics speculation market, did indeed result in many comics stores closing their doors for good.

Throughout 1995 and 1996, Heroes World continued to flounder, facing lost business and lawsuits. Finally, in 1997 the company went out of business, and Marvel returned to Diamond Distributors, which by that point was the only major distributor left standing.

== See also ==
- List of book distributors
- Marvel Comics
