= Superior Tours =

A Superior Tours bus at one of its regular stops

Superior Tours is an intercity bus company operating several fixed routes and numerous chartered trips within the Mid-Atlantic region. The company is based in the suburbs of Baltimore, Maryland, and some its daily routes include service to New York City and Atlantic City. Service to these cities is available from the Baltimore suburbs or Pikesville and Towson, and occasionally Fallston. The company does not offer walk-up service, and strongly recommends reservations.

The company was voted number of by Baltimore Magazine in August 2000.

The company suffered a setback in the weeks following the September 11 attacks, when business declined 50-60%. According to the Baltimore Sun, the company expected a loss of $100,000. The company, however, bounced back from these losses the following month.

On July 28, 2007, a fleet of 11 Superior buses transported 550 people to Cooperstown to see the induction ceremony of Cal Ripken Jr. into the Baseball Hall of Fame, and was among several Baltimore-area bus companies that offered this service. The company reported it had sold out this service a year prior to the event.
