= ICv2 =

American digital trade magazine

- Website type: Comics, show business and gaming webzine
- Available in: English
- Owners: GCO, LLC
- Creator: Milton Griepp
- Website: www.icv2.com
- Commercial: yes
- Launched: January 2001; 25 years ago
- Current status: Active

ICv2 is an online trade magazine that covers geek culture for retailers. ICv2's main areas of focus are comic books, anime, gaming, and show business products. The site offers news, reviews, analysis, and sales information for retailers and librarians. ICv2 holds an annual trade conference in conjunction with the New York Comic Con; the company also periodically publishes ICv2 Retailer Guides in hard copy format.

The site is produced by GCO, LLC, based in Madison, Wisconsin.

== Name ==
ICv2 stands for Internal Correspondence version 2, named after a trade magazine by Capital City Distribution which was published from 1982 to 1996.

== History ==
Capital City Distribution co-founder Milton Griepp published Internal Correspondence, first as a newsletter and then as a magazine, until Capital City was acquired by Diamond Comic Distributors in 1996, retaining rights to the name. He launched ICv2 online in January 2001. The ICv2 Retailer Guides magazines were launched in 2002.

In 2011, ICv2 began holding an industry conference on the eve of the New York Comic Con, at the Jacob K. Javits Convention Center. Held annually, the ICv2 event is now known as the "White Paper Happy Hour."

Griepp (on behalf of ICv2) supervised the 2015 American Anime Awards balloting.

ICv2: The Business of Pop Culture, edited by Griepp, was nominated for the "Best Comics-Related Periodical/Journalism" Eisner Award in 2025. In July 2025, ICv2 announced they had "transitioned to a fully remote company after occupying offices in Madison, Wisconsin for its first 24 years". In July 2026, ICv2 updated its logo and other branding.
