= Void Indigo =

Comic book series

- The cover of Void Indigo #1 (November 1984), art by Val Mayerik.

Publication information
- Publisher: Marvel Comics (Epic Comics)
- Format: Graphic novel Limited series
- Genre: Superhero
- Publication date: 1984; November 1984 – March 1985
- No. of issues: Graphic novel and 2 out of 6 issues
- Main character: Jhagur

Creative team
- Written by: Steve Gerber
- Artist: Val Mayerik
- Letterer: Andy Kubert
- Editor(s): Laurie Sutton; Archie Goodwin

Void Indigo was a short-lived and controversial comic book series written by Steve Gerber, with art by Val Mayerik. It was published initially as a graphic novel (with painted artwork) and then as truncated limited series by Epic Comics from 1984 to 1985.

== Premise ==
The project focuses on an alien named Jhagur who arrives on Earth with a spirit of vengeance against the four wizards who had tortured and killed him in his previous life. The title was noted for its combination of metaphysical themes with graphic violence, grotesque imagery, and the occult.

== Development ==
Gerber originally developed the concept as a pitch for revamping DC Comics' Hawkman — "combining the Earth-One and Earth-2 versions into a new version of the character. The idea being that he was an alien from Thanagar who was the reincarnation of an ancient Egyptian prince." After DC turned him down, he then shopped the concept (minus the Hawkman connection) to independent publishers Eclipse Comics, First Comics, and Pacific Comics, but could not come to an agreement.

== Publication history ==
Gerber successfully brought the concept to Marvel Comics, a company he had recently quit. Gerber reworked the story, illustrated by Val Mayerik, into one of the first graphic novels published by Epic Comics — Marvel Graphic Novel #11 — in 1984. (Although Void Indigo was published as a creator-owned Epic title, the story included references to Marvel concepts such as Atlantis and Zhered-Na.)

The graphic novel attracted controversy for its graphic violence and surreal horror elements; shortly after publication, copies were seized by Canadian customs officials over concerns that it violated pornography statutes.

Void Indigo was then solicited as a six-issue limited series by Epic; the first issue was published with a November 1984 cover date. Distributor reaction to the series was negative, with both Steve Geppi of Diamond Comic Distributors and Rob Van Leeuwen of Andromeda Distributing Limited weighing in:

After the initial problems he had with the graphic novel, Van Leeuwen made the decision not to carry the regular Epic series at all, assuming the series would continue on in the same vein. "I just took a moral stand, and none of the stores I supply will carry it from me," he said. "My accounts can go elsewhere if they want them. I personally object to the book." Prior to Marvel's decision to cancel the series, Van Leeuwen expressed his feelings about the book. “I'd just like to see Marvel cut off the whole series, to tell you the truth," he said.

According to The Comics Journal, dealer resistance to the series' "unusually violent and bizarre concepts" contributed to low sales. Creator Gerber estimated circulation in the 30,000–40,000 range.

Critical reaction was also negative, and orders for the second issue dropped further, leading to Epic's editor-in-chief Archie Goodwin deciding to end the series after its second issue. Contributing factors included production delays, with Gerber acknowledging that he had only rough outlines for the first several issues. Marvel staff similarly cited irregular shipping schedules and Gerber's other professional commitments as factors. Gerber and Goodwin reportedly discussed revising the series' premise to make it more commercially viable, but Gerber opposed substantially softening its content:

"...the dealers didn’t want to order the book, the distributors didn’t want to carry it, and, under those circumstances, Marvel didn’t want to publish it, because it wasn’t going to make any money. My feeling was, rather than change the book and bring it more in line with the mainstream, let it die a quick and painless death. Archie Goodwin and Val Mayerik agreed with me completely. We never fought the cancellation."

Issues #3–6 were not completed, although Gerber's synopsis for the unpublished issues was later leaked onto the Internet,.

== Plot ==
Void Indigo begins in a prehistoric era, where four ancient sorcerers seek to escape aging and death through rituals that manipulate reincarnation and the metaphysical realm known as the "Void Indigo," through which souls pass between lives. Their actions corrupt the natural balance between life, death, and rebirth, while the warrior Ath’Agaar and his lover Ren become victims of the sorcerers' pursuit of power.

Thousands of years later, Ath’Agaar has been reincarnated as Jhagur, an alien starship captain who once also lived on Earth as a human. Drawn back to Earth by unresolved events connected to the sorcerers, Jhagur crash-lands in the American Southwest and becomes involved with Amanda Tower, her daughter Cosima, and a group connected to the mysterious mystic Taro and the cult of the demigod Kaok.

As Jhagur investigates the surviving sorcerers and recovers memories of his previous incarnations, the story reveals that the disturbances in the Void Indigo threaten both Earth and the spiritual cycle itself. The published story ends with the re-emergence of Kaok's influence and the beginning of a larger supernatural conflict.

=== Unpublished continuation ===
The unpublished storyline would have expanded the mythology of the Void Indigo and introduced Jhagur's evolving mystical abilities, including the "Ninth Sight," which allowed him to perceive other dimensions and his past incarnations. The continuation involved the return of the ancient "Dark Lords," psychic links among Jhagur, Amanda Tower, and Linette, and an apocalyptic struggle against the demigod Kaok in both the physical world and the "Beyond-World." The synopsis culminates with Jhagur defeating Kaok in the Void Indigo itself with the aid of his past incarnations.

== Reception ==
Critical reaction to Void Indigo and its graphic depiction of violence was harsh: in his Comics Buyer's Guide column, "The Law is a Ass", Bob Ingersoll criticized the graphic novel's "unrelentingly depressing" tone and its depiction of humanity as "debased and depraved and criminal without even one redeeming or marginally good characteristic;" he called the comic itself a "crime against humanity". In revisiting his columns a decade later, Ingersoll edited his criticism to take out "very inappropriate" assumptions about Gerber, although he still found Void Indigo to be "pustulate".

Similarly, in his review for Amazing Heroes, R. A. Jones called Void Indigo "...unquestionably one of the most vividly violent books of the year," while also criticizing Mayerik’s artwork and coloring as "pale and watered down."

Writing in The Comics Journal, Carter Scholz wrote that "a lot of page space is given to details of torture and death," while arguing that Gerber was attempting "a kind of story inimical to comics."

R. Fiore's Comics Journal review of the first of the limited series was no more positive:

There's screwy and then there's screwy. "Humans... cannot bear to face the darkness in their nature" in these nasty old latter days (according to the introduction), but if Steve Gerber has his way you’ll get your minimum daily requirement and then some. Three bloody killings in this issue and it feels like more. Gerber's been on this graphic violence kick for a good five years now, and he still hasn’t figured out that the true darkness is inside the human heart and not in the act of cutting it out.

A retrospective review of the graphic novel in The Slings & Arrows Graphic Novel Guide was more measured in its appraisal of the comic's violence: "While this still merits an adult rating, time has passed and it's no longer as shocking, primarily as it's no longer the isolated example." The rest of the review, however, was mixed at best, characterizing the tone of the book as more "early Heavy Metal" than Marvel, while citing Gerber's "lack of focus" and Mayerik as being a "limited storyteller."
