= Pacific Comics =

Defunct comic book distributor and publisher

- Industry: Comics
- Founded: 1971; 55 years ago (as mail order retailer); 1981; 45 years ago (as comics publisher)
- Founder: Bill Schanes, Steve Schanes
- Defunct: 1984; 42 years ago (ceased publishing); 1985; 41 years ago (liquidated)
- Headquarters: San Diego, California
- Key people: Steven E. Schanes, Christine Marra, Paul "Pablo" Schanes, Chris Schanes
- Services: Mail order service, Retailer, Distributor, Publisher
- Revenue: c. $1 million (1980)
- Owner: Blue Dolphin Enterprises

Pacific Comics was a comic book distributor and publisher active from 1971 to 1984. The company began as a San Diego, California, comic book shop owned by brothers Bill and Steve Schanes, later moving into comics distribution and then publishing.

As a publisher, starting in 1981, Pacific took early advantage of the growing direct market, attracting a number of writers and artists from DC Comics and Marvel Comics to produce creator-owned titles, which were not subject to the Comics Code, and thus were free to feature more mature content.

== History ==
=== Origins ===
In 1971, the Schanes brothers (Steve Schanes, age 17, and Bill Schanes, age 13) co-founded Pacific Comics, which started out as a mail-order company, selling to consumers via advertisements in the Comics Buyer's Guide. This led to ads inside some Marvel comics, and ultimately to tangible retail stores. The first Pacific Comics store opened in Pacific Beach, California, in 1974, and business was soon doing so well that the brothers realized they "couldn't get merchandise" for the stores, and so set up a distribution system, which was soon supplying neighboring stores also.

The move from newsstand distribution to the direct market (non-returnable, heavily discounted, direct purchasing of comics from publishers) happened in the 1970s, in large part due to the work of Phil Seuling and his Sea Gate Distributors company (founded in 1972), as well as a number of individuals, including the Schanes brothers and Bud Plant. The direct market went hand-in-hand with the creation of specialist comics shops to cater to the collectors who could then buy back issues months after a newsstand issue had disappeared. By the late 1970s, thanks partly to the success of films such as Star Wars and Superman: The Movie, comics were selling well, and Pacific expanded its distribution system nationwide, raising $200,000 by closing its four San Diego retail locations and selling off inventory, rising rapidly to the top of the new distribution system.

In the six years between 1974 and 1980, comic or fantasy-related specialty shops rose from numbering 200–300 to around 1500, while Pacific was operating out of a 2,200-square-foot (200 m^{2}) office warehouse in Kearny Mesa, with 500 wholesale accounts. According to elder brother Steve, the company "grossed just under a million dollars that year," soon doubling its floorspace.

=== Publishing ===
In 1979, Pacific dipped its feet into publishing when they released Warriors of Shadow Realm, a John Buscema portfolio of six signed, colored plates meant to accompany a Doug Moench and Buscema three-issue Weirdworld epic-fantasy tale which ran in Marvel Comics Super Special #11-13 (June-Oct. 1979).

In 1981, rival distributor Capital City launched a black-and-white title, Nexus, and distributed it through their own system. The Schanes brothers took note, and decided to follow suit, even though they were still paying off debt from a $300,000 bank loan taken out in 1979 at 25 percent interest. Steve — who, with a degree in sculpture had a background in art — handled negotiations with creators, while Bill took on the business and accounting end. The brothers turned to Jack Kirby. Steve Schanes recalled, "I figured if you want to get people's attention with a new comic book, who better to do it with than the King of Comics, Jack Kirby! We were already friends with Jack. We used to send him free copies of comics he'd drawn for other publishers because they never sent him any! So I just went ahead and called him on the phone, and he turned out to be a nice guy, completely accessible. ... We negotiated a whole detailed publishing deal between the two of us. No middlemen."

The Schaneses asked Kirby, who had effectively quit comics in 1978, for only the publishing rights, assuring him that he could keep full ownership and copyrights, and said they would even help him license characters for use overseas or in other media. Thus, Pacific claims to have become the first company to pay royalty payments to Kirby. Kirby provided Pacific with Captain Victory and the Galactic Rangers, which was published bimonthly from August 1981. Though the Schaneses anticipated sales of less than 25,000, the first issue sold 110,000 copies. Kirby then let Pacific publish his Silver Star, and the brothers decided to start a line of full-color mainstream comic books.

Before long, Pacific had attracted interest from other comics professionals, including Mike Grell (who recalls that he was actually the first to sign with Pacific by a couple of weeks, but that Kirby's work was published first because he "delivered his first.") who had planned his Starslayer to appear from DC, but after it dropped from the schedule, the Schaneses approached him about publishing it.

Another invitee was then-aspiring artist Dave Stevens, who purchased comics from Pacific's shops and had met the brothers at San Diego Comic-Con in 1981. When Starslayer #2 came up short a few pages, Stevens was approached to fill in the remaining pages, and ultimately came up with The Rocketeer.

=== Experimentation and expansion ===
In 1983 Pacific upgraded to paper with higher quality ink. Pacific's innovations in creator-owned properties and high-quality printings were soon imitated by industry leaders DC Comics and Marvel Comics.

Pacific continued to distribute and publish comics, running both operations from a San Diego warehouse to which they'd moved in July 1982. They also purchased a firehouse in Steeleville, Illinois and converted it into a distribution hub. It was also operating warehouses in L.A. and Phoenix at the time. Printing about 500,000 comic books every month, the Schanses employed around forty people at their San Diego operation alone, and were grossing over $3.5 million per annum.

The brothers hired their father, Steven E. Schanes, as financial vice president and their mother (Christine Marra) as office manager. Elder brother Paul "Pablo" worked in the financial records department, and sister Chris, an L.A.-based attorney, provided counsel on legal affairs.

=== Later output ===
Pacific's published output contained editorials by David Scroggy, who had started as a comics retailer in 1975, and risen to general manager of Pacific's four San Diego shops by the late 1970s. He helped to bring the reclusive Steve Ditko to Pacific.

Ditko's Pacific offering Missing Man was previewed in Captain Victory #6, and then featured in issues of Pacific Presents. His work was scripted by Mark Evanier. Meanwhile, Pacific published a magazine-sized black-and-white reprint of Rog 2000 stories that John Byrne had done in the '70s for Charlton Comics, as well as a number of titles under its parent company Blue Dolphin Enterprises. It also welcomed Bruce Jones to the company, and Sergio Aragonés and Mark Evanier's Groo the Wanderer.

=== 3-D, Elric, and falling sales ===
By 1984, Steve Schanes decided to bring back 3-D to comics, a fleeting trend in the 1950s that had then been stymied by poor printing separations. Ray Zone was hired to do the production, after he had successfully converted a Kirby image for Honeycomb cereal. Steve Schanes decided the 3-D book would be Alien Worlds 3-D, featuring the first published work of Art Adams, alongside John Bolton, Bill Wray and others. Sales on the expensively-produced comic, however, were poor, and sales all round were following suit. One-shots became more common, and tolerable sales on Elric of Melniboné stumbled when First Comics acquired the rights, putting Pacific in the awkward position of continuing as distributor on a comic from a rival publisher that they had helped promote.

=== Competition and collapse ===
After organizational difficulties pushed back the release of Starslayer by several months, Mike Grell decided to take his creator-owned property to First Comics, and a domino effect began to occur as the loss of a high-profile title to a rival publisher engendered bad industry PR, leading other creators to lose faith in Pacific.

More importantly, the distribution arm of Pacific was suffering serious problems, due in part to overly-generous credit extensions to retailers, which were not paid back as quickly as expected. Thus, Steve Schanes explained:

Most of our comic books still made money hand over fist, but there was a big problem in distribution. We extended too much credit to retailers who didn't pay us on a timely basis, and we were already working on a minuscule profit margin, maybe five percent to eight percent. We didn't push hard enough to get the money from receivables, who owed us hundreds of thousands of dollars. If you had to boil down the single biggest reason we blew it, that would be our poor cash management on the distribution side.

Pacific's publication arm was also attracting competitors, and Pacific found itself distributing competitors' titles, including Kitchen Sink Press, Last Gasp (publisher), and Rip Off Press. With this in mind, other publishers—including Capital City (whose Nexus comic outsold several Pacific titles), Comico, Aardvark-Vanaheim, Educomics, Quality, Eagle, Eclipse, First, Vortex, New Media, Fantagraphics, Mirage—feared that having Pacific, a rival publisher, as their distributor could result in their being cut off from comic shops. This likely played a factor in the multiple alternate distributors who came into being to compete with Pacific, until nearly a quarter of Pacific's comic-shop accounts defected to alternate distributors in 1984, skipping out on paying Pacific for upwards of three months' worth of comic books.

At the same time, Pacific and parent company Blue Dolphin Enterprises found themselves the target of lawsuits, including some dealing with foreign rights and royalties for Pacific-published creator-owned titles. In August 1984, with the company $740,000 in debt, the Schaneses informed their staff that they would all be out of work by September. According to Steve Schanes, Pacific's publishing arm was still seeing profit at the time of the closure, but it was outweighed by the losses of the distribution arm, and he and his brother lacked the business expertise to sell off part of the business.

=== Liquidation ===
After the 1984 collapse of Pacific, many of its creator-owned publications moved to Eclipse Comics: Bruce Jones' Twisted Tales, Alien Worlds, and Somerset Holmes; Dave Stevens' Rocketeer Special and a one-shot of Mark Evanier/Sergio Aragones' Groo the Wanderer.

As Pacific went into liquidation in September 1984, Phil Seuling's distribution company Sea Gate Distributors also closed down. Pacific's distribution centers and warehouses were purchased by Bud Plant, Inc., and Capital City Distribution, who also opened an expanded facility in Seagate's old space in Sparta, alongside the comic-book printing plant.

Steve Schanes and his wife, Ann Fera, subsequently founded Blackthorne Publishing, and Bill Schanes found employment with Diamond Comic Distributors.

== Legacy ==
Writer Jay Allen Sanford stated that Pacific "formed the template for Image Comics."

== Creators associated with Pacific Comics ==
- Neal Adams
- Sergio Aragonés
- Steve Ditko
- Mark Evanier
- Michael T. Gilbert
- Mike Grell
- Bruce Jones
- Jack Kirby
- P. Craig Russell
- Dave Stevens

== See also ==
- Capital City Distribution
- New Media/Irjax
- Seagate Distribution
