= Direct market =

Dominant distribution and retail network for American comic books

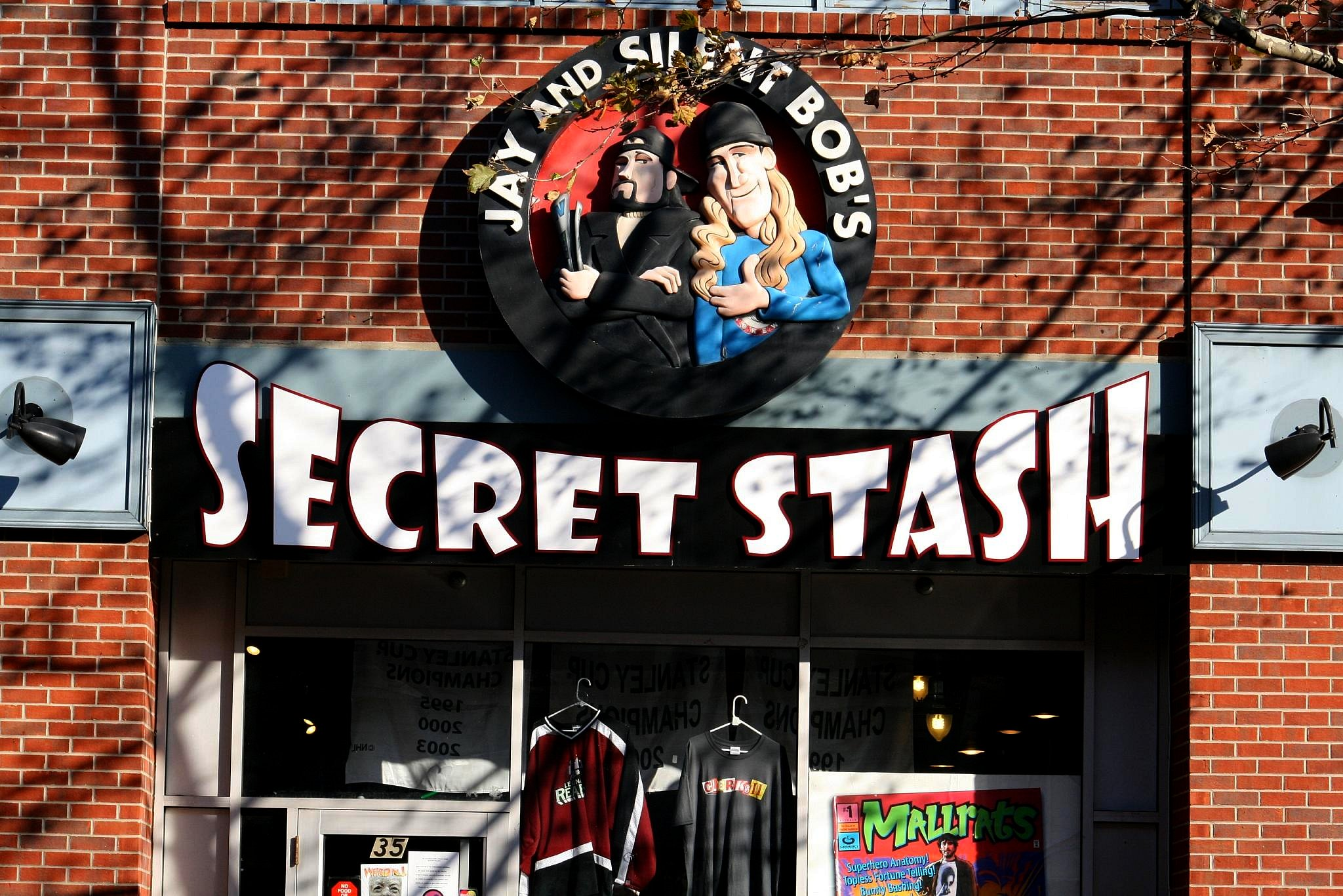
Jay and Silent Bob's Secret Stash comic book store in Red Bank, New Jersey

The direct market is the dominant distribution and retail network for American comic books. The concept of the direct market was created in the 1970s by Phil Seuling. The network currently consists of:

- three major comic distributors:
  - Diamond Comic Distributors, which distributes most, if not all, non-DC/Marvel/Image/IDW/Dark Horse comics (having exclusive deals with those publishers) and wholesales Marvel Comics, Image Comics, IDW Publishing, and Dark Horse Comics.
  - Lunar Distribution (which distributes DC Comics since 2020 and Image Comics since 2023);
  - Penguin Random House Publisher Services (the distribution arm of the publishing company), which since 1 October 2021 distributes Marvel Comics, since 1 June 2022 distributes IDW Publishing, and since 1 June 2023 distributes Dark Horse Comics; and
- the majority of comics specialty stores, and
- other retailers of comic books and related merchandise.

The name is no longer a fully accurate description of the model by which it operates, but derives from its original implementation: retailers bypassing existing distributors to make "direct" purchases from publishers. The defining characteristic of the direct market however is non-returnability: unlike book store and news stand distribution, which operate on a sale-or-return model, direct market distribution prohibits distributors and retailers from returning their unsold merchandise for refunds. In exchange for more favorable ordering terms, retailers and distributors must gamble that they can accurately predict their customers' demand for products. Each month's surplus inventory, meanwhile, could be archived and sold later, driving the development of an organized market for "back issues."

The emergence of this lower-risk distribution system is also credited with providing an opportunity for new comics publishers to enter the business, despite the two bigger publishers Marvel and DC Comics still having the largest share. The establishment and growth of independent publishers and self-publishers, beginning in the late 1970s and continuing to the present, was made economically possible by the existence of a system that targets its retail audience, rather than relying on the scattershot approach embodied in the returnable newsstand system.

== Comic book specialty shops ==
Prior to the 1970s, most comics were found in newsstands, grocery, drug, convenience, and toy stores. A handful of early comic book specialty shops first appeared in the late 1960s, stocking back issues as well as sourcing new releases from newsstand distributors and the new counterculture underground comix. The oldest known such comics specialty shop in North America (or worldwide for that matter) has been Canadian comic book store Viking Bookshop, established in Toronto by "Captain George" Henderson in the spring of 1966, one year later renamed to "Memory Lane Books" when it relocated to other premises in the city. The oldest US comic book store is reputed to have been Gary Arlington's San Francisco Comic Book Company which was established in April 1968 in the namesake city. Neither store is in existence anymore, though the third oldest known one, the Dutch Amsterdam-based comic book store Lambiek (est. November 1968), still is as of 2022 – in the process becoming the oldest known comic book store still in existence. In the 1970s, the development of the direct market allowed a widespread network of comic shops to flourish. The specialty shop presented a number of competitive advantages:

- Timing: direct-market specialty shops were often able to obtain new issues a week earlier than newsstand vendors.
- Condition: the wire racks of grocery, drug, and toy stores were often only half the height of comic books, resulting in bent spines and dog-eared pages. In contrast, direct market retail outlets usually attempt to maintain their inventory in good condition. Their shelves are often the full height of the comic book. Many stores also included backing boards and vinyl bags to further protect comics upon purchase (a practice that began in the 1980s and continues in some shops today).
- Content: direct-only stores could cater to older, more mature audiences, and thus can market material deemed too offensive (due to graphic violence, nudity, language, drug use, etc.) for grocery/drug/convenience/toy stores. In addition, due to the non-returnable nature of direct sales, typical direct-only stores contain a substantial archive of back issues. These retailers could also stock ancillary merchandise such as figurines, posters, toys, and novelties that would not be expected to be stocked by newsstands, etc.
- Price: The older, more mature customers of direct-only stores are typically willing to pay several times more than the average customer of a grocery/drug/toy store. Cover prices approaching (or even exceeding) $5.00 became common.
- Knowledge: The proprietors of direct-only stores are often collectors themselves, which means they are quite familiar with their inventories. Customers often have the option of phoning their orders in ahead of time, and by the time the customers arrive at the direct-only stores their orders will be set aside behind the counter (known as "pull and hold"). Direct-only store proprietors often arrange their inventory by publisher and/or genre, as opposed to the haphazard presentation of grocery/drug/toy stores.

== History ==
=== Background ===
Before the direct market, from the 1930s through the 1960s, most comic books were distributed through newsstands, pharmacies, and candy stores. The major distributors during this period included American News Company and Independent News, which was owned by National Periodical Publications, the parent company of DC Comics. Charlton Comics had their own distributor, Capital Distribution Company (not to be confused with the later entity Capital City Distribution).

In 1957, Atlas (later Marvel Comics), was forced to switch from American News to that of its biggest rival, Independent News, which imposed draconian restrictions. As then-Atlas editor Stan Lee recalled in a 1988 interview, "[We had been] turning out 40, 50, 60 books a month, maybe more, and ... suddenly we went ... to either eight or 12 books a month, which was all Independent News Distributors would accept from us." In 1968, while selling 50 million comic books a year, Marvel revised the constraining distribution arrangement with Independent News it had reached under duress during the Atlas years, allowing Marvel now to release as many titles as demand warranted. By 1970, Independent News was defunct, absorbed into a larger and changing distribution business.

=== 1960s and 1970s ===
The underground comix movement of the late 1960s was part of an alternative distribution network that also served the underground press, which proliferated in the mid-1960s. As underground comix were not sold in newsstands or drugstores, head shops played an important role as retailers of those publications. The underground comix movement was based in San Francisco and a number of distributors originated in the Bay Area, including the Print Mint (beginning c. 1969), the already mentioned comic book store San Francisco Comic Book Company (which doubled as a publisher, beginning c. 1970), Bud Plant Inc. (1970), Last Gasp (1970), Keith Green/Industrial Realities (c. 1970), and Charles Abar Distribution. Around 1970, underground distributors sprang up in various regions of the U.S., including Los Angeles — George DiCaprio and Nova — and the Midwest — Donahoe Brothers Inc. (Ann Arbor, Michigan), Keep On Truckin' Coop/Big Rapids Distribution (Detroit, Michigan), Wisconsin Independent News Distributors (Madison, Wisconsin), Isis News (Minneapolis, Minnesota), and Well News Service (Columbus, Ohio). By the mid-1970s, Big Rapids had acquired all of its midwestern competitors; by that time, the market for underground comix had essentially dried up.

The direct market was created in the early 1970s in response to the declining market for mainstream comic books on newsstands. Fan convention organizer and comic dealer Phil Seuling approached publishers in 1972 to purchase comics directly from them, rather than going through traditional periodical distribution companies. Unlike the newsstand, or ID (for independent distributor) market, which included drugstores, groceries, toy stores, convenience stores, and other magazine vendors, in which unsold units could be returned for credit, these purchases were non-returnable. In return, comics specialty retailers received larger discounts on the books they ordered, since the publisher did not carry the risk of giving credit for unsold units. Instead, distributors and retailers shouldered the risk, in exchange for greater profits.

Additionally, retailers ordering comics through Seuling's Sea Gate Distributors (and within two years, through other companies) were able to set their own orders for each issue of each title, something which many local IDs did not allow. This ability to fine-tune an order was crucial to the establishment of a non-returnable system.

Direct distributors typically were much faster at getting the product into the hands of their customers than were IDs: a direct distribution warehouse generally had re-shipped a weekly batch of comics or delivered it to local customers within a day or two (sometimes within hours) of receiving the books from the printer. By contrast, most IDs would usually take two or even three weeks to do so, though some moved more quickly. This factor was a strong drawing card for retailers whose customer base consisted principally of fans eager to see the new issues each week.

Finally, another factor in creating demand for direct sales distribution was that many IDs refused to deal with comics specialty shops or with any retailer who dealt in back issues on any terms at all, fearing that used comics could be purchased by these shops from readers for pennies, and then cycled back through the system as returns for full credit at a profit.

By the mid-1970s, other direct sales distribution concerns had sprung up, mostly regionally based (Donahoe Brothers in the Great Lakes region, Pacific Comics Distributors in Southern California, and New Media/Irjax in the Southeast were all operating by early 1974), essentially replacing the order-taking and fulfillment functions of newsstand distributors for the infant comic shop specialty market. For several years, Seagate retained an edge over its competitors in that it was able to provide "drop shipping" (the shipment of an order directly from the printer to the retailer) to its customers for quantities of 25 or multiples thereof per issue, while the newer distributors had to use more conventional methods, putting together customer orders and re-shipping or delivering them from their own warehouses. Threats of legal action and the need for retailers to order very precise (and sometimes very small) quantities of items ended this practice for all but the largest customers by the end of the 1970s, and extended the ability to provide drop shipping to those large customers to all the direct distributors — by which time several of the newer distributors had multiple warehouses.

Newsstand distribution through the IDs continued at the same time (and indeed remained dominant for years afterward, on its conventional returnable, low-discount terms).

=== 1980s ===
In the early 1980s, a trade organization, the International Association of Direct Distributors (IADD) was formed, consisting of all the distributors who purchased product directly from either DC, Marvel, or both. The IADD had annual conferences, issuing obscenity guidelines in 1987, and electing Diamond Comic Distributors' Steve Geppi as IADD Vice President in 1988.

As early as 1980, Marvel Comics saw the growth potential of the direct market, and by 1981 was putting out a number of titles geared specifically to that market (including Dazzler and Ka-Zar the Savage). By the early 1980s, all the major publishers were producing material specifically for the new market, series that would probably not sell well enough on the newsstand, but sold well enough on a non-returnable basis to the more dedicated readers of the direct market to be profitable.

Several of the new distributors lasted a relatively short time, and were succeeded by more competitive organizations; Diamond Comic Distributors replaced New Media/Irjax and Capital City Distribution largely replaced Big Rapids Distribution in the marketplace.

By 1985, the number of direct distributors in North America peaked with approximately twenty companies, many of them multi-warehouse operations, purchasing product for resale to retailers directly from either DC Comics, Marvel Comics, or both. There were also an unknown number, probably in the dozens, of sub-distributors who bought DC and Marvel product from these larger companies (and often the products of other, smaller publishers direct from those publishers), and re-sold to retailers. Most of these sub-distributors were in cities in which the direct distributors themselves did not (at least as yet) have warehouses, including Philadelphia, Boston, Columbus (Ohio), Madison (Wisconsin), Lansing (Michigan), Indianapolis, and Berkeley (California). Many of them were eventually absorbed by the companies which had been their principal suppliers.

From the mid-80s to the mid-90s, nearly every major urban area in the United States had at least one (and sometimes two or three) local direct distribution warehouses that functioned not only as distribution points for pre-ordered weekly shipments, but also as what could be described as "supermarkets for retailers", where store owners could shop for reorders and examine and purchase product that they might not have ordered in advance.

=== 1990s ===
As newsstand sales continued to decline, the Direct Market became the primary market of the two major comics publishers (DC Comics and Marvel Comics). In the late 1980s and early 1990s, as the popularity of comics collecting grew, many new comics shops opened, and existing retailers (such as sports card shops) joined the Direct Market, carrying comics as a side business. By this time, Diamond and Capital City each had approximately twenty warehouses from coast to coast, and both were functioning as fully national distributors. Several of their larger remaining competitors, notably Glenwood, Longhorn, and Bud Plant, had either sold out or gone out of business.

Such rapid growth (due partially to speculation) was unsustainable, however. The market contracted in the mid-1990s, leading to the closure of many Direct Market shops. Diamond and Capital City began closing local warehouses, moving from a decentralized model in which many local warehouses provided full service to a given area to a centralized one with a few shipping hubs and no local walk-in service at all. In 1994, Capital City created controversy by announcing penalties for publishers who didn't deliver their products within promised deadlines; this move followed an industry-wide push for 30-day returnability, a practice formerly in use when comics were primarily distributed in newsstands.

In early 1995, Marvel Comics purchased Heroes World, by that time the third largest distributor behind Diamond and Capital City, with the intention of self-distributing their products; Heroes World also stopped carrying other publishers' books. Other distributors sought exclusive deals with other major publishers to compensate for the substantial loss of Marvel's business. DC Comics, Image Comics, Dark Horse Comics, and several smaller publishers made exclusive deals with Diamond Comic Distributors. Most other distributors, including Capital City Distribution, Diamond's main competitor at the time, either went out of business or were acquired by Diamond. Others established niches — such as re-orders — in which they could compete. When self-distribution failed to meet Marvel's objectives, they also signed an exclusive distribution deal with Diamond, which had by then become the primary supplier for the Direct Market.

=== 2000s and 2010s ===
In the early 2000s, Diamond continued to dominate direct-market distribution. However, the bookstore market began to challenge the Direct Market as a channel for sales of increasingly popular graphic novels. The growth of interest in comics among mainstream booksellers and book publishers led to several publishers arranging for bookstore distribution outside of Diamond (for example, Tokyopop through HarperCollins, or Fantagraphics through W. W. Norton), while Diamond created Diamond Book Distributors.

=== 2020s ===
In 2020, the COVID-19 pandemic resulted in public health authorities in affected regions ordering non-essential retail sectors and businesses closed for the interim. Diamond Comic Distributors announced on March 24, 2020, a full suspension of distributing published material and related merchandise as of April 1, 2020, until further notice. As Diamond has a near-monopoly on printed comic book distribution in North America, this was described as an "extinction-level event" that threatened to drive the entire specialized comic book retail sector out of business. As a result, publishers like IDW Publishing and Dark Horse Comics suspended publication of their periodicals while DC Comics explored distribution alternatives, including an increased focus on online retail of digital material. On April 17, 2020, DC announced that two new distributors would be shipping their comic books — Lunar Distribution and UCS Comic Distributors, which are owned by Discount Comic Book Service and Midtown Comics, respectively. On April 28, 2020, Diamond announced that shipping to retailers would resume on May 20, after a seven-week shutdown.

During this period, direct market communication also expanded through independent digital media curators. Online channels, such as Near Mint Condition hosted by Omar Valdivieso, began collaborating with major publishers to host official collected edition reader polls, preview upcoming catalog solicitations, and bridge communication between publishers and the direct market fan community.

== Direct market distributors ==
The list below includes sub-distributors, who bought their mainstream comics from one of the companies below but many of whom were on direct terms with one or more of the smaller or underground publishers.

=== United States ===
Distributor name	Headquarters	Founded	Closed	Fate	Notes
Action Direct	Kansas City, Kansas			Defunct	operated in the 1980s; in 1985 acquired assets of Cavco Longhorn
Alternate Realities Distributing, Inc.	Denver, Colorado	1979	1987	Acquired by Bud Plant	Wholesale distributor operated by Mile High Comics and run by Nanette Rozanski
Big Rapids Distribution	Detroit, Michigan	1975	1980	Bankruptcy	Originally underground press and underground comix distributor founded in 1970; began mainstream comics distribution in early 1975, when Donahoe Brothers Inc. of nearby Ann Arbor went under. Two former employees — Milton Griepp and John Davis — went on to form Capital City Distribution.
Bud Plant Inc.	Grass Valley, California	1970	1988	Acquired by Diamond	Wholesale distribution operation
Capital City Distribution	Madison, Wisconsin	1980	1996	Acquired by Diamond	
Cavco Longhorn	Texas		1985	Accounts acquired by Action Direct	
Charles Abar Distribution	Belmont, California		1982	Acquired by Bud Plant	
Cold Cut Distribution	Salinas, California	1994	2008	Assets acquired by Haven Distribution	Owned by Mark Thompson and Tim Stroup. Specialized in small-press and independent comics; in March 1998, acquired the assets of Minnesota-based Downtown Distribution
The Comic Distributor	Lansing, Michigan	1975	1979	Acquired by Big Rapids Distribution	Sub-distributor started by former Donahoe Brothers employee Jim Friel. (The name "The Comic Distributor" was later taken by Mark Hylton of Comic Carnival.)
Comic Kingdom	Detroit, Michigan	1981	early 1980s	Acquired by Glenwood Distributors	Started by retailer Bob Hellems
Comics Hawaii	Honolulu, Hawaii			Defunct	
Comics Unlimited	Staten Island, New York	1975	1994	Acquired by Diamond	Operated by Ron Foreman and Walter Wang; also a retailer — the retailer business was acquired by Fantasy Books & Games in mid-1995
Common Ground Distributors	Berkeley, California	1978	1982	Acquired by Capital City	Sub-distributor started by Robert Beerbohm and initially supplied by Big Rapids Distribution
Destiny Distributors	Seattle, Washington	early 1980s	1990	Acquired by Diamond.	Sub-distributor started by Phil Pankow and initially supplied by Bud Plant
Diamond Comic Distributors	Baltimore, Maryland	1982	—	Active	Inherited New Media/Irjax distribution centers and warehouses
Donahoe Brothers Inc.	Ann Arbor, Michigan	c. 1970	1975	Bankruptcy; accounts acquired by Big Rapids Distribution	The second direct distributor (pre-dating both Pacific Comics and New Media Distribution by a month or two). The Donahoes had been in business for about a year, dealing first with Marvel Comics, then Warren Publishing, Atlas/Seaboard Comics, Charlton Comics, and Archie Comics, and finally (and only for about two or three months) with DC Comics when they went out of business. Also known as Comic Center Enterprises; their catalog was called Weekly Dealer
Fat Jack's Comicrypt	Philadelphia, Pennsylvania	1976	—	Defunct as distributor	Still active retailer that once acted as a sub-distributor
FM International	Wisconsin	1996	2006	Defunct	Primarily supplied back-stock
Friendly Frank's	Gary, Indiana	1984	1995	Acquired by Capital City	Owner's name was Frank W. Mangiaracina. "Registered agent" located in Gary, Indiana; owner's offices located in Glen Ellyn, Illinois. Their catalog was called Future Comics.
Glenwood Distributors	St. Louis, Missouri	c. 1980	1987	Bankruptcy	Sold in 1986, they went through a financial crunch in the spring of 1987, were sued by four publishers that summer, and declared bankruptcy in the fall of 1987
Global Hobo Distro	San Francisco, California	2003	c. 2012	Defunct	Distributor of hand-made and hard-to-find comics co-founded by Andy Hartzell and Jesse Reklaw; was partnered with Last Gasp
Haven Distributors	Chicago, Illinois	2008	2011	Defunct	Began by acquiring the assets of Cold Cut Distribution. Primarily focused on non-exclusive independent publishers; formally out of business as of October 31, 2011.
Heroes World Distribution	Morristown, New Jersey	1975	1997	Acquired by Marvel Comics in 1995	The third largest distributor (behind Diamond and Capital City) at the time of its acquisition and out of business soon thereafter
Isis News	Minneapolis, Minnesota		mid-1970s	Acquired by Big Rapids Distribution	Sub-distributor
Last Gasp	San Francisco, California	1970	2017	Defunct as distributor	Founded as a publisher; began distributing soon after
Lunar Distribution	Fort Wayne, Indiana	2020	—	Active	Part of Discount Comic Book Service
New Media Distribution/Irjax Enterprises	Rockville, Maryland	1973	1982	Assets sold to Diamond	Run by Hal Schuster. In late 1981, the company filed for Chapter 11, and in 1982 it sold the distribution end of the business to Steve Geppi (who immediately founded Diamond Comic Distributors).
Nova	Los Angeles, California		mid-1970s	Acquired by Big Rapids Distribution	Sub-distributor
Pacific Comics Distributors	San Diego, California	c. 1974	1985	Bankruptcy; distribution centers and warehouses acquired by Bud Plant Inc. and Capital City Distribution	Retailer, publisher, and distributor; went bankrupt in 1984
Print Mint	Berkeley, California	c. 1969	c. 1975	Defunct	Also a publisher and retailer; mostly focused on underground comix, posters, and other products of the counterculture
Sea Gate Distributors	Brooklyn, New York	1972	1985	Bankruptcy	Essentially the first direct market distributor
Second Genesis Distribution	Portland, Oregon		1991	Acquired by Diamond in 1990	
Solar Spice and Liquors	Cambridge, Massachusetts	c. 1981	1982	Acquired by Diamond	Originally owned by Hal Schuster of New Media/Irjax
Southern Fantasies/C.I.B.	Atlanta, Georgia	1986	c. 1994	Defunct	
Sunrise Distribution	Commerce, California	early 1980s	c. 1988	Bankruptcy	Run by Scott Mitchell Rosenberg
UCS Comic Distributors	New York City, New York	2020	—	Active	Part of Midtown Comics
Well News Service	Columbus, Ohio		late 1970s	Acquired by Big Rapids Distribution (?)	Sub-distributor; their personnel later became the nucleus of an early Capital City Distribution branch
Wisconsin Independent News Distributors (WIND)	Madison, Wisconsin	1971	late 1970s	Acquired by Big Rapids Distribution	Eventually run by Milton Griepp and John Davis, who later went on to co-found Capital City Distribution

=== Canada ===
- Andromeda Distributing Limited (Toronto, Ontario) — established in the mid-1980s, operated by Rob Van Leeuwen of the retailer Silver Snail Comics
- Big Picture Distribution (Toronto, Ontario) — managed by Robert Myre
- Comex Distributors (Calgary, Alberta) — acquired by Portland, Oregon-based Second Genesis Distribution in 1988
- Galileo Distributors (Edmonton, Alberta)
- Multi-Book and Periodical (Toronto, Ontario)
- Robin Hood Distribution (Oakville, Ontario)
- Styx International (Winnipeg, Manitoba)

=== United Kingdom ===
- Neptune Distribution — operated from 1986 to 1991, when it was acquired by Diamond
- Slab-O-Concrete — small press-focused distributor run by Peter Pavement; operated from 1994 to 2001
- Titan Distributors — operated from 1978 to 1993, when it was acquired by Diamond

== See also ==
- Comic book collecting
- Comic strip syndication
- Quarter bin
