= New Media/Irjax =

Defunct comic book distributor and publisher

- Type: Comic book distributor Comic book publisher
- Industry: Comics
- Founded: 1973; 53 years ago
- Founder: Hal Schuster; Irwin Schuster; Jack Schuster
- Defunct: 1982 (as distributor); 1995 (as publisher)
- Headquarters: Rockville, Maryland, then Largo, Florida, then Los Angeles, then Las Vegas
- Key people: James Van Hise
- Divisions: Irjax Enterprises; New Media Publishing; New Media Books; Psi Fi Movie Press; Pop Cult; Heroes Publishing; Movie Publisher Services; Movieland Publishing; Pioneer Books

New Media Distribution/Irjax Enterprises was a comic book distributor and publisher active from the mid-1970s to the mid-1980s. In 1978, the company's legal actions against the dominant distributor of the era, Sea Gate Distributors, widened the field for the direct market to expand. In 1982, when Irjax's distribution arm went out of business, its processing centers and warehouses formed the basis for Diamond Comics Distributors, the now-dominant comics distributor.

The company's publishing arm, New Media, continued in the business until 1995. New Media mainly published periodicals for comics/fantasy/science fiction enthusiasts, including the long-running critical journal Comics Feature. Editors and writers with New Media included Carol Kalish, Richard Howell, Peter B. Gillis, Kurt Busiek, Don and Maggie Thompson, James Van Hise, Peter Sanderson, Max Allan Collins, Ron Goulart, Will Jacobs and Gerard Jones, Steve Perrin, and Roy Thomas.

== Distributor ==
=== Origins ===
Hal Schuster, his father, Irwin, and his brother, Jack, formed the distribution company Irjax Enterprises (a play on the names "Irwin" and "Jack"), based in Rockville, Maryland, in 1973.

=== Entering the direct market ===
By 1978, in addition to Irjax Enterprises, Hal Schuster had a comic book store in Rockville. After Phil Seuling established the direct market in 1972, his company Sea Gate Distributors maintained a virtual monopoly on comic book distribution, until a lawsuit brought by Irjax in 1978. Irjax sued the comic book publishers DC, Marvel, Archie, and Warren for their anti-competitive arrangement with Seagate. As a result of the lawsuit Irjax gained "a sizeable chunk of the direct-distribution market," with distribution centers in Boston and Tampa. The Boston-area division was known as Solar Spice and Liquors (named after a fictional corporation created by science fiction writer Poul Anderson); and was staffed by Carol Kalish and her partner Richard Howell.

=== Exit New Media/Irjax, enter Diamond Comics Distributors ===
Meanwhile, Baltimore retailer Steve Geppi had four comic book stores and was acting as a sub-distributor, "doing a little informal distributing . . . for smaller retailers." By 1981, Geppi was one of New Media/Irjax's biggest accounts. In late 1981, the company, now known as New Media Distribution, or New Media/Irjax, filed for Chapter 11. One of the "last loyal customers" when New Media began having fiscal difficulties, Geppi made a deal with Schuster: "[t]he owner was going into retail," so Geppi agreed to provide Schuster with "free books for a period of time in return for his account list."

Hal Schuster relocated to Florida early in 1982, and he asked "Geppi to service more accounts for a bigger discount," thereby effectively selling Geppi the distribution end of the business. Geppi took over New Media/Irjax's office and warehouse space and had to "sort out the good customers from the bad overnight," negotiating with creditors to continue Schuster's distribution business as Diamond Comic Distributors.

== Publisher ==
In addition to their comics distribution business, in 1975 Hal and Jack Schuster set up a publishing operation, originally producing periodicals for comics/fantasy/science fiction enthusiasts. In a practice similar to the pulp magazine era, the brothers set up a number of publishing entities, especially during the period 1985–1987. Overall, the Schusters published material from 1975 to 1995.

Befitting the overall fly-by-night feeling, over the years the Schusters operated publishers out of Rockville, Maryland; Boston; the Tampa Bay area (Largo and Tampa); various Los Angeles locations (Studio City, Topanga, Canoga Park, and Granada Hills); and finally Las Vegas.

=== Irjax Enterprises ===
The brothers' first publishing venture, Irjax Enterprises, lasted from 1975 to 1977, releasing one publication each summer, on such subjects as Star Trek and Howard the Duck. Each issue of the various titles was labeled #1 but was never continued.

=== New Media Publishing ===
In 1980 the Schuster brothers established New Media Publishing (NMP), which ultimately produced the bulk of the company's output overall. Hal had the title of Publisher, while Jack had the title of President. They hired Carol Kalish, Richard Howell (doing double duty since they were still helping operate Solar Spice distribution), and Peter B. Gillis (as editorial director), and announced a slate of new titles, most of them professionally produced fanzines. Right off the bat, however, NMP began to promise more than it could deliver, such as announcing the critical journals Artform and Brush Strokes — which never appeared.

Gillis left NMP by mid-1981, replaced as editorial director by Howell. He and Kalish, however, left in 1982 — the same year New Media's distribution business failed. By then, NMP had developed a reputation for announcing titles that never appeared and/or releasing titles late and otherwise behind schedule. For instance, in 1981 NMP took over publication of the long-running fanzine Rocket's Blast Comicollector (previously edited and published by NMP writer/editor James Van Hise), but only put out three issues in the period 1981 to 1983 before RBCC was canceled. Similarly, New Media acquired the British fanzine BEM in 1981, ostensibly to distribute BEM in the U.S. and widen its readership. But, after many delays, NMP only produced two U.S. issues, #35 and #36, and BEM faded away.

NMP's most notable publications included:

- Comics Feature — magazine of comics criticism and commentary which published 57 issues (and a number of specials) between 1980 and 1987; original editors included Dean Mullaney, Carol Kalish, and Richard Howell
- LoC — subtitled "On Comics Opinion and Comics Review," it published 10 issues between 1980 and 1983, changing its name to Comic Fandom's Forum with issue #8.
- Enterprise Incidents — an influential early Star Trek fanzine originally published by James Van Hise through the SFCA (Science Fiction and Comics Association, publishers of Rocket's Blast Comicollector) which published 4 issues in 1976–1977. NMP picked up the title in 1981 and published 32 more issues (and numerous specials) between 1981 and late 1985; its title became SF Movieland with issue #28. Edited by James Van Hise.
- Fantasy Empire — about comics, fantasy fiction, and Doctor Who; it published 18 issues in the period 1981 to 1985. Spinoffs included 6 issues of Fantasy Empire Collectors Edition in 1983–1984, and 3 issues of Fantasy Empire Limited in 1984.
- Golden Age of Comics — reprints of classic comic books and comic strips alongside articles about comics history originally edited by Don and Maggie Thompson, it published 8 issues (plus one special) from 1982 to 1984; continued in different form as Comics, the Golden Age (a.k.a. Ron Goulart's Comics the Golden Age), which published five issues in the period 1984–1985.
- Daredevils — devoted to adventure films and TV, it published 14 issues in 1983–1985.
- Monsterland — originally edited by Forrest J Ackerman as his follow-up to Famous Monsters of Filmland, it published 17 issues between late 1984 and June 1987 (with the last eight issues being published by one of Schuster's follow-up publishing entities, Movieland Publishing).

Other notable names who worked for New Media as editors and/or writers included Don and Maggie Thompson, Kurt Busiek, and Peter Sanderson.

NMP also published a few actual comic books — three in total — featuring such creators as Doug Moench, Bill Sienkiewicz, Pat Boyette, Owen Wister, Don Heck, John Warner, Tom Sutton, P. Craig Russell, Steve Ditko, Steve Englehart, Don McGregor, Mark Evanier, Steve Leialoha, Grass Green, and Mike Sekowsky.

In October 1982, Marilyn Bethke of The Comics Journal published a takedown of the Hal Schuster and his various publications.

Branching into book publishing in 1985, the brothers established New Media Books (NMB), which published a few softcover books in the same vein as the company's periodicals.

== Post-NMP magazine publishing companies ==
With the demise of New Media Publications in 1987, things became much more complicated. By then, the brothers were running four publishing corporations — New Media Books, Movie Publisher Services/Movieland Publishing, Psi Fi Movie Press, and Heroes Publishing — all sharing the same office space in Topanga, California. Jack was the president of New Media Books, Movie Publisher Services, and Heroes Publishing; while Hal was president of Psi Fi Movie Press.

Psi Fi published Files magazine, as described in The Comics Journal:

The File[s] Magazine series consists of magazine-sized, perfect-bound books, containing 60 pages retailing from $4.95 to $7.95. The series focuses on comic characters, TV shows, rock groups, or movies, mixing text pieces with photos or drawings. Other titles in the File[s] series include James Bond, Doctor Who, The Monkees, Star Trek, and others.

Files Magazine also covered Marvel and DC heroes; article authors included Martin Cannon, Edward Gross, Glenn A. Magee, Doug Murray, John Peel, and James Van Hise; with Schuster serving as editor and publisher.

In 1986, Schuster announced that Movie Publisher Services would release a 60-page paperback collection of articles and interviews with the comics superstar Frank Miller — unauthorized by Miller, who threatened legal action. Ultimately the book was released by Heroes Publishing as Frank Miller, A Work In Progress: Great Comic Artist File (part of the Files Magazine series).

In 1987 Marvel Comics sued the Schuster brothers for copyright and trademark infringement, claiming they had improperly used Marvel artwork in various issues of Files. The Marvel lawsuit appears to have put the various Schuster Brother operations out of business, as they stopped publishing after that point.

=== Pioneer Books ===
In 1989 Hal Schuster got back into book publishing by starting a new company, Pioneer Books. Pioneer published softcover books in a pop culture vein similar to New Media; many volumes were written by James Van Hise. Schuster designed and edited most of the books. Based in Las Vegas, Pioneer operated from 1989 to 1995.

== Schuster Brothers publishing entities ==
This is a breakdown of the various Schuster Brothers publishing entities from 1975 to 1995:

- 1975–1977 Irjax Enterprises, Inc. (Rockville, Maryland)
- 1980–1987 New Media Publishing (Boston; Florida; Los Angeles)
- 1985–1988 New Media Books, Inc. (Canoga Park, California)
  - 1985–1987 Psi Fi Movie Press
    - 1985–1988 Pop Cult, Inc.
- 1986 Heroes Publishing, Inc. (Mexico)
- 1986–1991 Movie Publisher Services, Inc./Movieland Publishing (Canoga Park, California)
- 1989–1995 Pioneer Books (Las Vegas)

== Titles published ==
=== Irjax Enterprises ===
- Media Spotlight #1: Star Trek Lives Again! (Summer 1975) — tabloid newspaper
- The Wonderful World of Marvel #1: Howard the Duck (Summer 1976) — tabloid
- The Wonderful World of Comics (August 1977) — magazine format

=== New Media Publishing (NMP) ===
==== Hobbyist publications ====
- Comic News (2 issues, 1983)
- Comics Feature (57 issues, Mar. 1980–July 1987)
  - Comics Feature Collectors Edition (2 issues, 1984)
  - Comics Feature Interviews (1 issue, 1984)
  - Comics Feature Summer Special (1 issue, 1983)
  - Comics Feature — The Fandom Zone (1 issue, 1980) — edited by Don and Maggie Thompson
- Comics, the Golden Age, aka Ron Goulart's Comics the Golden Age (5 issues, 1984–1985)
- Daredevils (14 issues, Nov. 1983–Jan. 1985) — edited by Hal Schuster and Cynthia Broadwater
- Enterprise Incidents/SF Movieland (32 issues, 1981–Dec. 1985)
  - Enterprise Incidents Presents Stephen King (1984)
  - Enterprise Incidents Presents The Alien Cook (1984)
  - Enterprise Incidents: Special Edition Spotlight on Interviews (1984)
  - Enterprise Incidents: Special Edition Spotlight on the Technical Side (1984)
  - Enterprise Incidents: Special Collector's Edition (6 issues, Nov. 1983–Jan. 1985)
  - Enterprise Incidents: Spotlight on Leonard Nimoy (June 1984)
  - Enterprise Incidents: Spotlight on William Shatner (June 1984)
  - Enterprise Incidents: Summer Special (1983)
  - Enterprise Incidents Technical Book (Oct. 1984)
- Fantasy Empire (18 issues, July 1981–July 1985)
  - Fantasy Empire Collectors Edition (6 issues, 1983–1984)
  - Fantasy Empire Limited (3 issues, 1984)
  - Fantasy Empire Presents H. P. Lovecraft (1984)
  - Fantasy Empire Special Summer Issue (Summer 1983)
- Future Gold / Golden Age of Comics (10 issues, c. 1980–Feb. 1984) — as Future Gold was the "Magazine of Comic Nostalgia and Investment" by Geoffrey Schutt; final 8 issues published as Golden Age of Comics
  - Golden Age of Comics Summer Special (Summer 1982) — edited by Don and Maggie Thompson
- LoC / Comic Fandom's Forum (10 issues, Jan. 1980–Jan. 1983)
- Monsterland (17 issues, Dec. 1984–June 1987)

==== Original titles ====
- Xal-Kor, the Human Cat (1 issue, Aug. 1980) — Grass Green's popular character, originally from the fanzine Star-Studded Comics.
- Adventure Illustrated (1 issue, Winter 1981) — adventure comics by Jim Starlin (cover), Doug Moench, Bill Sienkiewicz, Pat Boyette, Mark Evanier, Mike Sekowsky, Alan Gordon, Owen Wister, Don Heck, John Warner, and Tom Sutton
- Doctor and the Enterprise (2 issues, 1986) — Star Trek/Doctor Who fan fiction by Jean Airey (not comics — text story with illustrations)
- Fantasy Illustrated (1 issue, Apr. 1982) — fantasy anthology (not to be confused with 1960s fanzine) edited by Richard Howell; contributors include P. Craig Russell, Steve Ditko, Steve Englehart, Don McGregor, Mark Evanier, Tom Sutton, Steve Leialoha, Alan Gordon, and Mike Sekowsky

==== Books ====
- Goulart, Ron (1985). Comics, the Golden Age: The History of DC Comics
- Gross, Edward (May 1987). Star Trek: The Movies: The First Complete Book. ISBN 9781556980053 — behind-the-scenes details and interviews related to Star Trek: The Motion Picture, Star Trek II: The Wrath of Khan, Star Trek III: The Search for Spock, and Star Trek IV: The Voyage Home
- Van Hise, James (May 1985). Classic Files Magazine — The V Files (2 volumes) — about the V television show

=== Psi Fi Movie Press ===
- Files Magazine (1985–1987)

=== Pioneer Books ===
- Airey, Jean. (November 1989) The Doctor and the Enterprise. ISBN 1-55698-218-6
- Altman, Mark A. (1991). Twin Peaks Behind-the-Scenes: An Unofficial Visitors Guide to Twin Peaks. ISBN 978-1-55698-284-2.
- Anderson, Robert (1994). The Kung Fu Book: The Exclusive, Unauthorized, Uncensored Story of America's Favorite Martial Arts Show. ISBN 1-55698-328-X
- Cawley, John; Korkis, Jim (November 1990). The Encyclopedia of Cartoon Superstars: From A to (Almost Z). ISBN 978-1-55698-269-9
- Gross, Edward (1989). The Making of the Next Generation. ISBN 9781556982194
- Gross, Edward (1990). The Wonder Years: Growing up in the Sixties. ISBN 1-55698-258-5
- Scott; Fherenbach, Kurt (1992). SNL!: The World of Saturday Night Live. ISBN 978-1-55698-322-1
- Van Hise, James (1989). Batmania. ISBN 1-55698-252-6
- Van Hise, James (1989). The Green Hornet Book. ISBN 978-1556982767
- Van Hise, James (1989). How to Draw Art for Comic Books: Lessons from the Masters. ISBN 978-1-55698-254-5
- Van Hise, James (1989). The Serial Adventures of the Shadow. OCLC 166327164
- Van Hise, James (1990). Who Was That Masked Man? The Story of the Lone Ranger. ISBN 978-1556982279
- Van Hise, James (1992). Batmania II. ISBN 1-55698-315-8
- Van Hise, James (1993). Hot Blooded Dinosaur Movies. ISBN 9781556983658
- Van Hise, James (1993). Sci-Fi TV from Twilight Zone to Deep Space Nine. ISBN 155698362X
- Van Hise, James (1995). Batmania III. ISBN 9781556983825
- Van Hise, James with Hal Schuster (1995). The Unauthorized Trek: The Complete Next Generation. ISBN 978-1-55698-377-1

== See also ==
- Capital City Distribution
- Pacific Comics
- Sunrise Distribution
- List of book distributors
- Amazing Heroes
- Comics Buyer's Guide
- The Comics Journal
