= Bookselling =

Business of selling and dealing with books

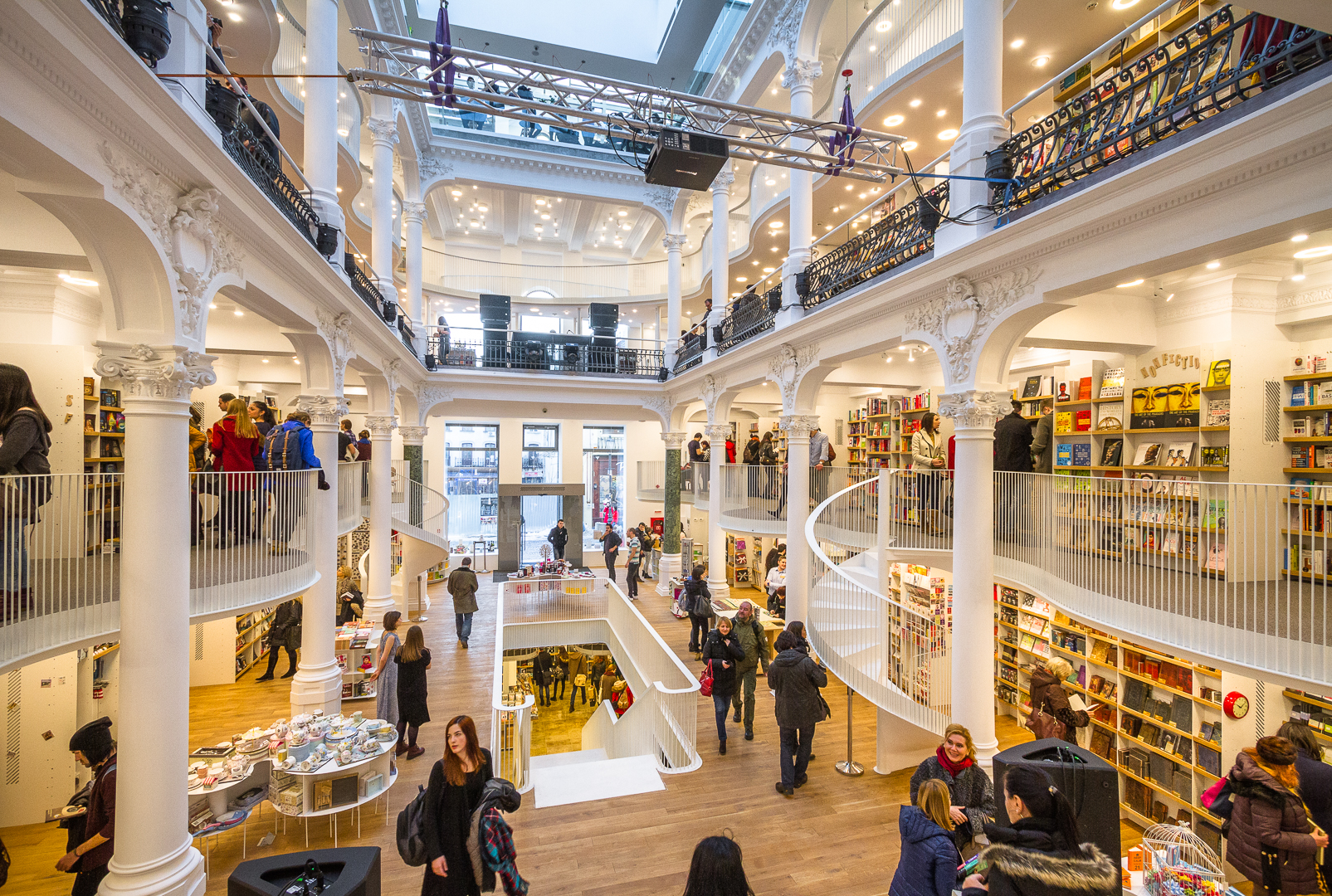
Cărturești Carusel, a bookshop in a historical building from Bucharest (Romania), built in 1860 as a bank. Its interior combines Baroque Revival architecture with modern design.

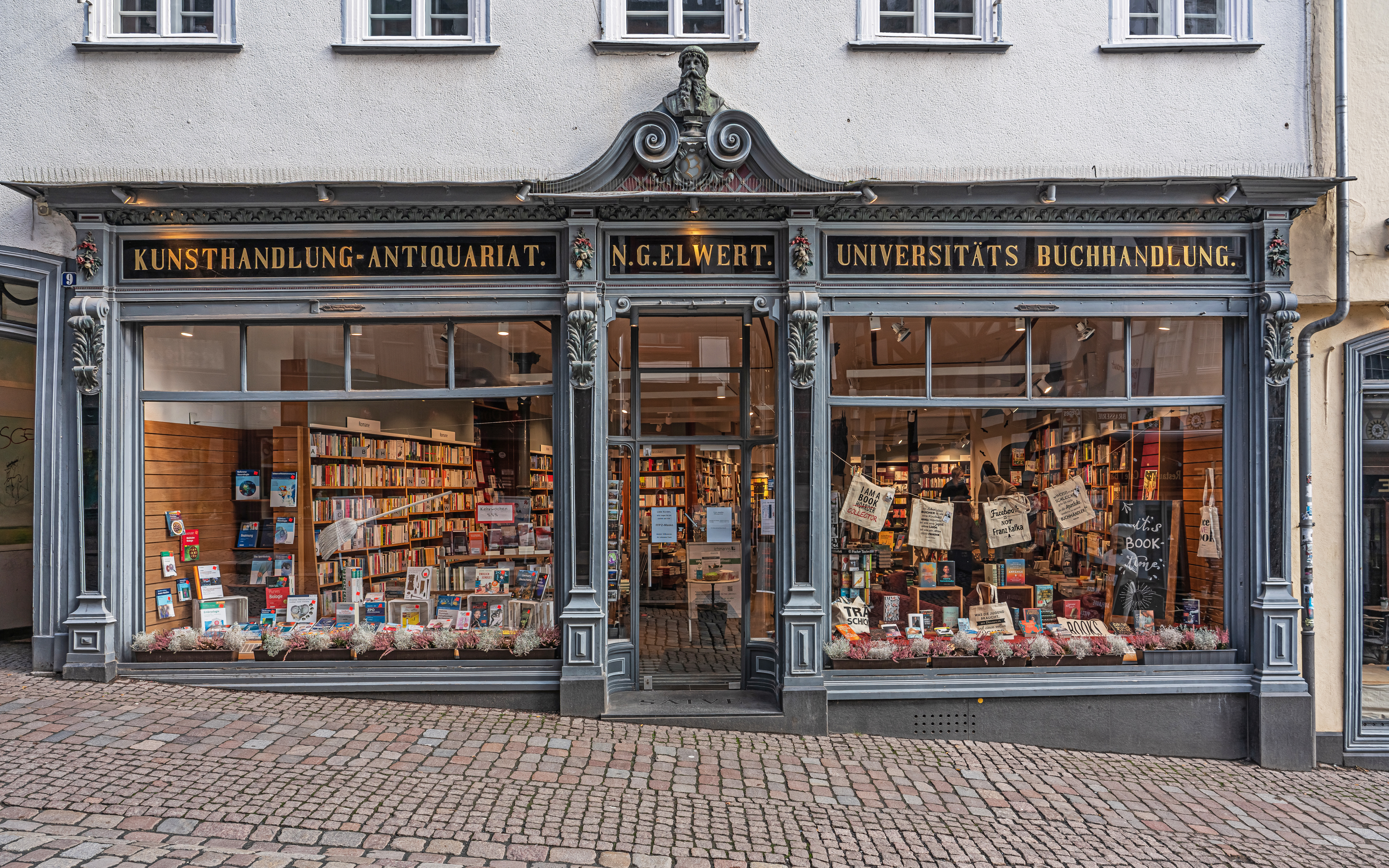
Bookshop in Marburg (Hesse, Germany)

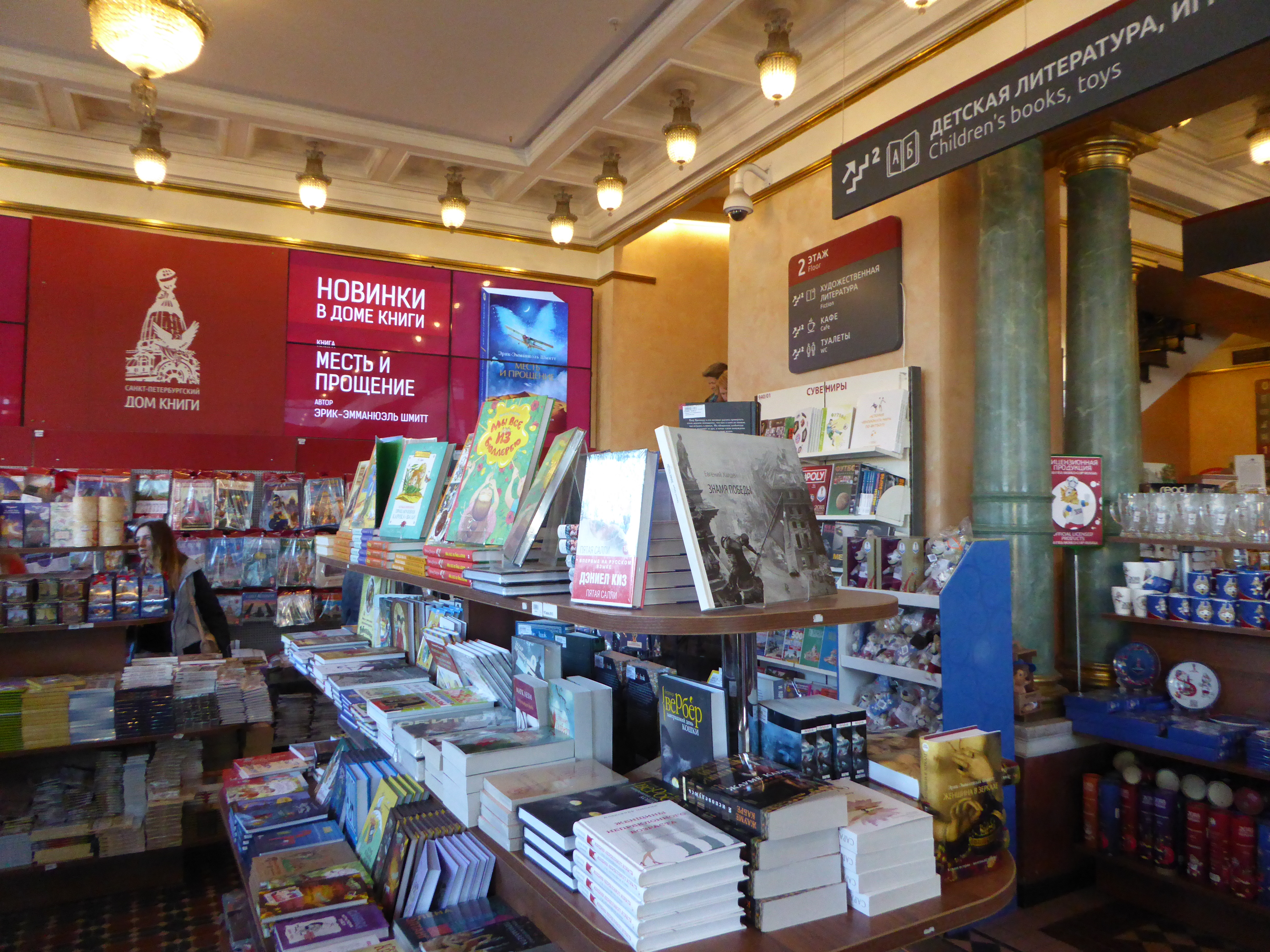
Interior of the bookshop from the Singer House (Saint Petersburg, Russia)

Bookselling is the commercial trading of books which is the retail and distribution end of the publishing process.

People who engage in bookselling are called booksellers, bookdealers, book people, bookmen, or bookwomen.

== History ==
The founding of libraries in c. 300 BC stimulated the energies of the Athenian booksellers.

In Rome, toward the end of the republic, it became the fashion to have a library, and Roman booksellers carried on a flourishing trade.

The spread of Christianity naturally created a great demand for copies of the Gospels and other sacred books, and, later on for missals and other devotional volumes for both church and private use. The modern system of bookselling dates from soon after the introduction of printing. During the 16th and 17th centuries, the Low Countries, for a time, became primary center of the bookselling world. Modern book selling has changed dramatically with the advent of the Internet. Major websites such as Amazon, eBay, and other big book distributors offer affiliate programs and dominate book sales.

== Modern era ==
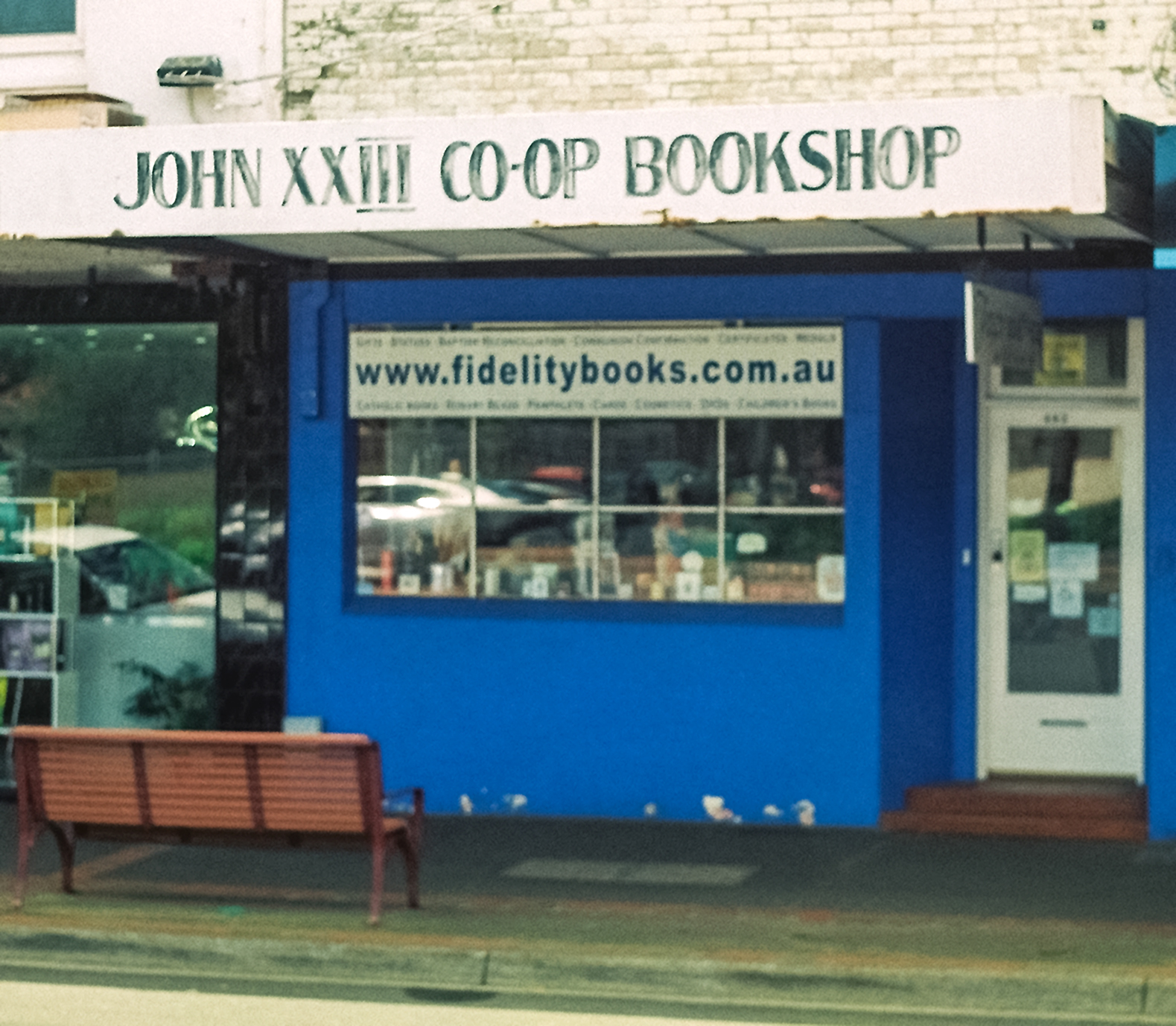
Catholic Book shop in Victoria, Australia

Bookstores (called bookshops in the United Kingdom, Ireland, Australia, and most of the Commonwealth, apart from Canada) may be either part of a chain, or local independent bookstores. Stores can range in size, offering several hundred to several hundred thousand titles. They may be brick and mortar stores, internet-only stores, or a combination of both. Sizes for the larger bookstores exceed half a million titles. Bookstores often sell other printed matter besides books, such as newspapers, magazines, and maps; additional product lines may vary enormously, particularly among independent bookstores. Colleges and universities often have bookstores on campus that focus on providing course textbooks and scholarly books and also sell other supplies and logo merchandise. Many on-campus bookstores are owned or operated by large commercial chains such as TGJones (formerly WHSmith) or Waterstones in the United Kingdom, or BNED in the United States.

Another common type of bookstore is the used bookstore or second-hand bookshop which buys and sells used and out-of-print books in a variety of conditions. A range of titles are available in used bookstores, including in print and out-of-print books. Book collectors tend to frequent used bookstores. Large online bookstores offer used books for sale, too. Individuals wishing to sell their used books using online bookstores agree to terms outlined by the bookstore(s): paying the online bookstore(s) a predetermined commission once the books have sold. In Paris, the Bouquinistes are antiquarian and used booksellers who have had outdoor stalls and boxes along both sides of the Seine for hundreds of years, regulated by law since the 1850s and contributing to the scenic ambiance of the city.

In some cities bookstores are specially relevant for tourism, such as Buenos Aires, which is the city with the most libraries per capita in the world. According to the National Geographic, Buenos Aires hosts the most beautiful library in the world, El Ateneo Grand Splendid which used to be a theatre in the early 20th century and later became a library. In the present it is visited everyday by tourists from all over the world.

== See also ==
- Book store shoplifting
- Bookstore tourism
- History of books
- Independent bookstore
- List of independent bookstores
- Quarter bin
