= Milton Griepp =

American businessman (born 1954)

- Born: c. 1954 (age 71–72); Wisconsin, U.S.
- Education: B.A., sociology, University of Wisconsin–Madison
- Occupations: Businessman, distributor, consultant

Milton Griepp (born c. 1954) is an American businessman who has spent the bulk of his career involved with American comic books. He was the co-founder and CEO of Capital City Distribution, a distributor of comic books and related material, from 1980 to 1996. In 2001, he founded the online trade magazine ICv2 and acts as its CEO.

== Biography ==
While attending the University of Wisconsin–Madison for a master's degree in sociology, Griepp worked in the comics division of Wisconsin Independent News Distributors, located in Madison, Wisconsin. When the company was purchased by Big Rapids Distribution in 1978, Griepp and his coworker John Davis were absorbed as well. They both lost their jobs when Big Rapids went bankrupt in 1980, and Griepp drew unemployment benefits for two months.

At that time, Davis approached him to propose a partnership as comic book distributors. They founded Capital City Distribution in April 1980 when Griepp was 26 years old. With Griepp as CEO, the new business absorbed some of Big Rapids' assets and grew to be the largest comic book distributor in the United States. Griepp crafted a monthly newsletter, Internal Correspondence, which was sent to all of their retail customers. Capital City's main rival, Diamond Comics Distributors, overtook it in size through acquisitions in 1988. That year, Capital City and Diamond represented at least 70% of the comic book distribution market.

When trade magazine Hero Illustrated published a list of the 100 most important people in the comic industry in mid-1993, Griepp was ranked tenth because of his push for innovation in distribution technology. Griepp encouraged retailers to enter the computer age and was the first to offer online reordering options. His position fell to number 19 the following year because of turmoil caused by a bursting bubble in the industry. Diamond acquired Capital City in 1996 during a period of industry consolidation.

After next working as a publishing and retailing consultant, in 1999–2000 Griepp ran Next Planet Over, a San Francisco-based e-commerce company.

In 2001, he founded ICv2 (Internal Correspondence version 2), an online trade magazine which also conducts annual industry conferences. Comic professionals consider his annual white paper on comic sales the industry standard. Since then, Griepp has served as a board member for organizations such as the parent company of the digital comics distribution platform comiXology, and Free Comic Book Day, and the non-profit Comic Book Legal Defense Fund, where he held various positions including Treasurer and vice-president before retiring from the board in 2018. These roles led to him being ranked number 92 on Bleeding Cool Magazine's 2012 "Top 100 Power List" for the comic industry.
