= Wisconsin Independent News Distributors =

- Company type: Collective
- Industry: Distributor
- Founded: 1971; 55 years ago in Madison, Wisconsin, U.S.
- Founder: Jack Dunn, Roger Metcalf, Bill Morris, Roney Sorenson
- Defunct: "late 1970s"
- Fate: Acquisition by Big Rapids Distribution
- Successor: Capital City Distribution
- Headquarters: Madison, Wisconsin, United States
- Area served: Northern Illinois, Wisconsin, and eastern Minnesota
- Key people: Milton Griepp, John Davis
- Services: Underground press distribution; later comic book distribution

Wisconsin Independent News Distributors (WIND) was an alternative left-wing news distributor founded in 1971 in Madison, Wisconsin by Jack Dunn, Roger Metcalf, Bill Morris, and Roney Sorenson. All were students or otherwise involved in the student movement of the times at the University of Wisconsin–Madison. The collective expanded through the 1970s to involve over 20 people, and expanding its operations throughout northern Illinois, Wisconsin, and eastern Minnesota.

== Services ==
WIND distributed left-wing and progressive materials of all kinds, from music to drug publications to focused left-wing periodicals, which were delivered by truck route to a broad assemblage of retail stores. Retail resellers included head shops, which catered to the youth culture, food cooperatives, music stores, and regular periodical retail operations.

Notable among the material it distributed was TakeOver, a Madison-based underground newspaper. WIND was also among the first select groups to distribute Prairie Fire, the manifesto of the Weather Underground. In years subsequent to the operation of WIND as a political collective, it was learned the organization had been under routine surveillance by law enforcement agencies.

== Transition to comic book distributor ==
WIND enjoyed a multi-year run in its original incarnation until a waning of left-wing political activity brought change to the general culture. Ultimately the politically oriented organization devolved into a more mainstream product distributor focused on mainstream comic books.

Initially absorbed by a counterpart organization, the Detroit-based Big Rapids Distribution, which went bankrupt in 1980, its surviving elements provided a starting point for Capital City Distribution, a large comic book distributor operated for many years by two late-arriving members of the original WIND collective, Milton Griepp and John Davis.
