= Quarter bin =

Quarter bin is a phrase common in the American comic book community used to describe discount boxes of comic books sold for far less than the cover price. Typically going for $0.25 each, these comic books may be used, damaged, or new material that's been overstocked by the comic book retailer. Quarter bins tend to be unique to the comic book direct market, though they may be found in thrift stores and other stores selling used media (video games, compact discs, DVDs, etc.).

Due to the nature of demand in comic book collecting, retailers will purchase entire comic collections just for a few rare books and the rest of the books go into the quarter bin. It is common for most quarter bins to sell $0.25 comics for an even greater discount at five for $1.00.
