= Baltimore (magazine) =

Monthly magazine published by Rosebud Entertainment

- Cover of Baltimore's June 2012 edition
- Categories: City magazine
- Frequency: Monthly
- Founder: Baltimore Chamber of Commerce
- First issue: 1907
- Company: Rosebud Entertainment
- Country: United States
- Based in: Baltimore
- Language: English
- Website: baltimoremagazine.com
- ISSN: 0005-4453

Baltimore is a monthly magazine published in Baltimore, Maryland by Rosebud Entertainment L.L.C., a company owned by Steve Geppi and led by its President Michael Teitelbaum. It is the oldest, continuously published city magazine in the continental U.S. and was first printed in 1907 by the Baltimore Chamber of Commerce. In 1977, Philip Merrill's Capital-Gazette Communications purchased Baltimore from the Chamber; Merrill sold the magazine to a group of investors in 1992. Steve Geppi acquired Baltimore in 1994. It is a member of the City and Regional Magazine Association (CRMA).

In addition to the monthly print publication, Baltimore publishes daily content on www.baltimoremagazine.com and produces over 20 events per year. The tagline of the publication is "Inspiring Baltimore to discover more, do more, and be more."
