= Diamond Comic Distributors =

American comic book distributor

Diamond Comic Distributors, Inc.
- Type: Subsidiary
- Industry: Comics
- Founded: 1982; 44 years ago
- Headquarters: Hunt Valley, Maryland, United States
- Key people: Stephen A. Geppi, CEO; Chuck Parker, Exec VP and COO; Larry Swanson, VP Finance and CFO; Shawn Hamrick, VP Operations; Tim Lenaghan, VP Purchasing; Chris Powell, VP Retailer Services; Mike Schimmel, Sales Director
- Products: comic book distribution
- Revenue: $500 million
- Number of employees: 540
- Parent: Geppi Family Enterprises
- Website: DiamondComics.com

Diamond Comic Distributors, Inc. (often called Diamond Comics, DCD, or casually Diamond) is an American comic book distributor serving retailers in North America and worldwide. It transported comic books and graphic novels, as well as other popular culture products such as toys, games, and apparel, from comic book publishers or suppliers to retailers, before bankruptcy in 2025.

It is owned by Geppi Family Enterprises, which is also the parent company of Gemstone Publishing, E. Gerber Products, Diamond International Galleries, Hake's Americana & Collectibles, Morphy's Auctions, the Geppi's Entertainment Museum, and Baltimore magazine.

On May 16, 2025, the publishing arm and other subsidiaries of Diamond were sold to Sparkle Pop, a subsidiary of Ad Populum, while Alliance Game Distributors was sold to Universal Distribution. The acquisition included several companies under the Geppi Family Enterprises umbrella. Diamond's publishing arm was also the publisher of Previews, a monthly catalog/magazine showcasing upcoming comic books, graphic novels, toys, and other pop-culture merchandise. Diamond UK was sold to its management team.

Diamond Comic Distributors, Inc., itself remains a separate entity involved in bankruptcy proceedings.

== History ==
In 1982, Baltimore-based comics retailer Steve Geppi founded Diamond Comic Distributors. Diamond became the successor to direct-sales pioneer Phil Seuling's distribution dream when it took over New Media/Irjax's warehouses in 1982. Diamond further bought out early distributor Bud Plant Inc. in 1988, and main rival Capital City Distribution in 1996, to assume a near-monopoly on comics distribution, including exclusivity deals with the major comic book publishers.

=== Beginnings ===
By 1981/1982 Geppi had four comics retail locations and was already "doing a little informal distributing... for smaller retailers". Geppi found himself "one of the biggest accounts" for New Media/Irjax, and when the distributor "relocated to Florida, he asked Geppi to service more accounts for a bigger discount." One of the "last loyal customers" when New Media began having fiscal difficulties, Geppi made a deal: "[t]he owner was going into retail", so Geppi agreed to provide New Media/Irjax with "free books for a period of time in return for his account list", buying parts of the company, and founding Diamond Comic Distribution.

Geppi had been a sub-distributor for Hal Shuster's Irjax in the late 1970s. In what Mile High Comics' Chuck Rozanski describes as an "incredibly risky and gutsy move", Geppi took over New Media/Irjax's "office and warehouse space" and, recalled Rozanski, had to "sort out the good customers from the bad overnight" negotiating with creditors to continue Shuster's distribution business as Diamond Comic Distribution. Almost overnight, noted Rozanski, "[h]e went from being a retailer in Baltimore to having warehouses all over the place."

Geppi named his new company Diamond "after the imprint Marvel Comics used on non-returnable comics", and although the "publisher discontinued the symbol" months later, the name remained. "Diamond grew an average of 40 percent a year" as comics retail took off.

In 1983, Diamond hired an accounting firm. In 1985, Diamond hired "no-nonsense CPA" Chuck Parker "as Diamond's first controller". In 1994, Diamond employee Mark Herr noted that this move was Geppi's "best decision", as Parker "cares nothing about the comics. To him, it's dollars and cents." Parker describes his role as "smooth[ing] the emotion out of some decisions. Steve [Geppi] is a visionary and a risk-taker... and I tend to be more conservative."

=== Expansion ===
After starting his business through buying New Media/Irjax's warehouses and offices in 1982, Geppi's distribution company has bought out many other distribution companies since. Many fans "with little experience" started rival distribution companies only to "find they were in over their heads", allowing Geppi to "[buy] out the smart ones or pick... up the pieces after the stupid ones went out of business", according to Herr. Diamond was aided in his efforts by the publishers themselves. In the early 1980s, Marvel Comics and DC Comics provided trade terms favorable for larger distributors and those with efficient freight systems, effectively "play[ing] into the hands of the major distributors such as Capital and Diamond", and hastening the demise of smaller distributors.

In 1988, Previews, Diamond's monthly magazine showcasing upcoming comic books, was first published.

==== Bud Plant Inc. ====
Most notably, in 1988, Geppi bought up early mail-order distributor Bud Plant Inc., who had himself bought out Charles Abar Distribution in 1982. Plant had, since 1970, been selling underground comics (a field which Geppi and fellow distributor Buddy Saunders had tended to steer clear of). After making $19m in sales in 1987, Diamond bought West Coast distributor Plant's business in 1988 "and went national" thereby assuming control of "40 percent of the direct-sales market". (Diamond and Capital City Distribution had control of at least 70% between them.)

==== Further expansion ====
In 1990, Diamond acquired Oregon-based Second Genesis Distribution (whose operations folded in 1991). Second Genesis had previously absorbed distributors Sunrise Distributors and Comex. One week after announcing the acquisition of Second Genesis, Diamond announced the acquisition of the Seattle-based sub-distributor Destiny Distribution. Destiny had been started by Phil Pankow in the early 1980s, and was initially supplied by Bud Plant.

In 1991, Diamond moved into the UK market, acquiring Neptune Comic Distributors Ltd. (to whom they had formerly supplied US comics for the UK market), in the process creating Diamond UK. In 1993, Diamond acquired the single remaining dominant British distributor Titan Distributors, thus cornering the direct market in the United Kingdom.

In 1994, Diamond acquired Staten Island-based distributor Comics Unlimited. By this point, Diamond had "27 warehouses in the U.S., Canada, and the U.K., employ[ing] between 750 and 900 people;" operated its own trucking line; and controlled 45% of the market, making $222 million in sales.

In 1996, Diamond launched the toll-free Comic Shop Locator service.

==== Heroes World and Capital City ====
In 1995, Marvel Comics challenged Diamond and main rival Capital City by buying the third largest distributor—Heroes World Distribution—and distributing its titles in-house after taking over from Curtis Circulation. On April 26, 1995, Diamond reacted by outbidding Capital City for exclusive deals with Marvel's main rivals DC Comics, Dark Horse and Image on July 24, and Valiant Comics in August. Capital City's response saw it sign exclusive deals with Kitchen Sink Press and Viz Comics, but a year later faced the choice between bankruptcy and selling out. Diamond bought Capital City on July 26, 1996, assuming near-control of the comics distribution system. The purchase price was not disclosed, but the acquisition brought an estimated $50 million in sales revenue to Diamond.

In early 1997, when Marvel's Heroes World endeavor failed, Diamond also forged an exclusive deal with Marvel after the publisher's filing for Chapter 11 bankruptcy protection in December 1996.—giving the company its own section of comics catalog Previews (not least because the DC/Dark Horse/Image deal gave contractual prominence to those companies)—making "Geppi... the sole king of comics industry distribution in the summer of 1996".

==== Antitrust litigation ====
In 1997, Diamond's position in the comics industry, as "the sole source of most new comics products to comics specialty shops", ultimately saw the company become the subject of "an investigation by the U.S. Justice department for possible antitrust violations". The Justice Department launched an antitrust investigation into the comics industry and the alleged monopoly of Diamond Comics. The investigation was closed in November 2000, with no further action deemed necessary on the basis that, although Diamond enjoyed a monopoly in the North American comic book direct market distribution, they did not enjoy a monopoly on book distribution (books including non-comic books).

==== Books and games ====
In addition to having cornered the American comics distribution market, Diamond includes a number of subsidiary and affiliated companies. UK and European comics distribution is served by Diamond UK, based in Runcorn, England.

On August 31, 2000, Diamond Comic Distributors acquired Alliance Game Distributors, North America's largest distributor of tabletop games.

In 2002, Diamond consolidated its book trade into Diamond Book Distributors, marketing graphic novels and trade paperbacks to bookstores including Barnes & Noble, Ingram, Baker & Taylor, Amazon.com and Borders.

=== 2020 coronavirus shutdown ===
On March 23, 2020, Geppi announced that Diamond would stop sending comics to retail shops until further notice and had instructed printers not to send any new shipments to the company, due to the COVID-19 pandemic. Issues of comics with United States release dates of April 1 or later, and with United Kingdom release dates of March 25 or later, would not be shipped until normal operations resumed. The shutdown took effect on April 1, 2020, and ended on May 20.

=== DC Comics, Marvel Comics, IDW Publishing shift to other distributors ===
On June 5, 2020, DC Comics announced it they would discontinue its distribution agreement with Diamond and that its books would now be distributed by Penguin Random House for its graphic novels and by UCS Comic Distributors (subsidiary of Midtown Comics) and Lunar Distribution (a subsidiary of Discount Comic Book Service in Fort Wayne, Indiana). While acknowledging how huge the decision was, DC reiterated that the move was intended to fortify and increase the viability of the comic book direct market while also widening its fan base.

On March 25, 2021, Marvel Comics announced it planned to shift its direct market distribution, for both monthly comics and graphic novels, to Penguin Random House. The change was implemented on October 1, 2021, in a multi-year partnership. Unlike DC Comics' complete split, Marvel would still give stores the option to order comics from Diamond, but Diamond would be acting as a wholesaler rather than a distributor.

On September 17, 2021, IDW Publishing announced a new deal with Penguin Random House to distribute newly published and backlist comic book periodicals, trade collections, and graphic novels to the direct market comic shops beginning June 1, 2022. The deal was non-exclusive, allowing retailers to choose to order from Penguin Random House directly or from Diamond as a wholesaler rather than a distributor in the US and the UK.

=== Bankruptcy and sale ===
On January 14, 2025, Diamond filed for Chapter 11 bankruptcy protection to facilitate the restructuring of its operations. The company received a $39 million stalking horse bid to sell off Alliance Game Distributors to Canadian-based hobby distributor Universal Distribution. Alliance Entertainment ultimately won the bid to acquire Diamond's assets in March, but later backed out after filing multiple lawsuits against the company.

A joint bid between Universal Distribution and Ad Populum was then approved and finalized in May 2025. Universal acquired the assets of Alliance Game Distributors, while Ad Populum acquired Diamond Comic Distributors, Diamond Book Distributors, Diamond Select Toys, Collectible Grading Authority, and other assets. Diamond UK was not included in this sale. Diamond Select Toys was shut down in May 2025 along with sister company Gentle Giant Ltd.

Major layoffs at Diamond were reported soon after, including the shutdown of Diamond Select Toys. Penguin Random House ended its sub-distributor agreement with Diamond, ending its distribution of comics from Marvel Comics, Dark Horse Comics, IDW Publishing, BOOM! Studios, and others. By the end of May, Udon Entertainment had ceased shipments to Diamond. Dynamite Entertainment ceased shipments to Diamond and shifted to Lunar Distribution in mid-June. By July, Diamond's ComicSuite POS and PullBox pre-ordering system were shut down.

Diamond's existing inventory was not included in the sale, so the old company began selling the back stock without paying publishers. Nearly 130 companies were affected by this move, including Fantagraphics and Dynamite, which were both owed over $1 million and were in danger of not meeting payroll. The larger publishers whose stock was still held by Diamond formed two groups, namely the Ad Hoc Committee and the Consignment Group, to jointly fight Diamond's attempt at selling the remaining stock.

The Collectible Grading Authority, one of Diamond's smaller assets and a rival to Certified Guaranty Company, was later purchased by a consortium of investors in July 2025. Diamond UK was sold in September 2025 for about $2 million as part of a management buyout. The Previews magazine was discontinued following the publication of the final issue in October 2025. Diamond II LLC was formed by Ad Populum to manage comic and toy assets acquired from Diamond Comic Distributors, and launched Diamond Select Brands in partnership with Enesco in December 2025.

The main company Diamond Comic Distributors, Inc. itself still remains a separate independent entity involved in the bankruptcy case. In December 2025, Diamond announced that it would convert its Chapter 11 case to a Chapter 7 bankruptcy liquidation, after JPMorgan Chase refused to continue funding its operations. Diamond reached a settlement with the Ad Hoc Committee, Dynamite Entertainment, and Boom! Studios in August 2026 for publishers to reclaim their stock while not claiming the revenue generated from previous unauthorised sales of the stock. Sparkle Pop filed an objection but later withdrew it in November 2026. A settlement was reached between Diamond, Sparkle Pop and rest of the members of the Palik Consignment Group (formerly Consignment Group) in October 2026, with publishers having the option to pay Sparkle Pop for picking and packing or destroying the inventory.

== Criticism ==
In 1983, Diamond was criticized for taking exception to certain "adult"-themed titles and scenes, including an Epic Comics series called Void Indigo for its excessive violence.

In 1987, Geppi responded to "a graphic childbirth scene in Miracleman #9 [written by Alan Moore]". Geppi wrote to retailers that:

Diamond values its retailers too much to take chances on such a dangerous situation... We are not censors. We no more want someone deciding for us than you do. We cannot, however, stand by and watch the marketplace become a dumping ground for every sort of graphic fantasy that someone wants to live out. We have an industry to protect; we have leases to abide by; we have a community image to maintain.

This call for retailers to refuse to stock Miracleman led to accusations of censorship, charges the company was forced to address when it criticized or refused to carry other titles, including books by Kitchen Sink Press, Dave Sim in 1988, Jon Lewis in 1994, and Mike Diana in 1996.

Diamond lost customers with this approach, however, "and eventually backed down". Geppi recalls compromising, and accepting "that as a distributor, I owed the retailers the product they wanted." In fact, in an attempt to prove Diamond did not practice censorship, the company joined DC Comics in 1993 to raise money for the industry's First Amendment advocacy group, the Comic Book Legal Defense Fund.

Because of its industry dominance, Diamond also faced charges it bullied publishers and discriminated against small publishers. These charges first surfaced in 1988 when Diamond rejected Matt Feazell's comic Ant Boy, and in 1989 when it similarly decided not to carry Allen Freeman's Slam Bang anthology.

After the industry consolidation of 1996, Diamond faced similar charges in 1996, 1999, and 2000 (when mid-sized publishers like Fantagraphics and Drawn & Quarterly lodged complaints).

== Publishing ==
Diamond's monthly comics retail catalog, Previews, had been produced by Diamond for over 25 years for store owners and comic shop customers to order their products. It was additionally available for sale to customers to facilitate pre-orders from "pull and hold" or subscription customers who frequent comic shops on a regular basis. Comics publishers vied for space within the publication's pages, with Dark Horse, DC Comics, Image Comics, and IDW Publishing taking precedence as "Premier" publishers. Marvel Comics has its own mini-catalog of Marvel Previews available separately, for contractual reasons. The print Previews catalog was discontinued in June 2025, with the final digital catalog being the October 2025 catalog (Previews #445) for items in shops in December or later).

Geppi is also owner of Gemstone Publishing Inc., through which he publishes The Overstreet Comic Book Price Guide. Gemstone has also published Russ Cochran's EC Comics reprints, Disney comics and Blue Book price guide in the past.

=== Baltimore ===
In 1994, Geppi purchased Baltimore magazine, "a 50,000-circulation monthly and one of the USA's oldest regional publications".

=== Gemstone Publishing ===
Geppi's publishing ventures in the comics field saw him create Gemstone Publishing Inc., which was formed in large part from other purchases. In 1992, Diamond bought Ernst Gerber Publishing (publisher-author of the Photo-Journal Guide to Comics). E. Gerber Products, LLC is a Diamond-affiliated company started by Gerber in 1977 which sells Mylar bags as well as "acid-free boxes and acid-free backing boards" for comics collectors to store their collection in. In 1993, Geppi bought Russ Cochran Publishing. Long-term EC Comics fan Cochran auctioned Bill Gaines' personal file copies of EC publications, as well as most pages of original EC artwork (which, almost uniquely, Gaines had maintained ownership and possession of), before being granted the reprint rights to the EC back catalog itself. Geppi included Cochran's publications—and Cochran himself—under his new imprint, Gemstone Publishing.

In 1994, Geppi bought Overstreet Publishing, taking up the publishing reins of official-Blue Book price guide The Overstreet Comic Book Price Guide, and other related publications, bringing them under the Gemstone imprint. Geppi's publishing activities with Gemstone Publishing consist primarily of reprints of classic titles and artworks, as well as publications (including professional fanzines "pro-zines") focusing heavily on the history of the comics medium. Many Gemstone publications revolve around Comic Book Marketplace-editor and EC-shepherd Russ Cochran.

==== EC Comics reprints ====
Cochran, like Geppi, was a particular fan of Carl Barks' Disney comics, and had previously published EC reprints in association with Disney-reprinter Gladstone Publishing. In the early 1990s, Geppi's Gemstone embarked on a full series of reprints of classic EC titles, starting with new reprints of the Cochran/Gladstone-reprints of The Haunt of Fear, The Vault of Horror and Weird Science (all 1992). Gemstone also republished (in single issue and "annual"—four issues per "annual"—format) EC's New Trend and New Direction titles (with the exception of Mad) between 1992 and 2000.

In 2005, Gemstone added to Cochran's earlier-published oversize, hardback, black & white slip-cased "The Complete EC Library" collections with the complete Picto-Fiction collection, comprising the EC comics: Confessions Illustrated, Crime Illustrated, Shock Illustrated and Terror Illustrated, along with "18 previously unseen stories, never published before".

In 2006, Gemstone began producing a more durable and luxurious series of hardback reprint collections; the EC Archives—similar to the DC Archives and Marvel Masterworks volumes—which reprint in full-color hardback ('archival') format sequential compilations of the EC Comics titles. Designed by art director/designer Michael Kronenberg, a number of volumes have been released, with the entirety of the New Trend and New Direction planned for eventual release. These EC Archives volumes have drawn praise for their quality, and feature introductions by such notable EC fans as George Lucas, Steven Spielberg, Joe Dante and Paul Levitz.

==== Disney comics ====
In December 2002, it was announced that "Gemstone Publishing had signed the license to publishing Disney comics in North America", with ex-Gladstone Publishing editor-in-chief John Clark joining Gemstone in the same position over its Disney line. Launched with a title for Free Comic Book Day 2003, the line started soon after with Walt Disney's Comics and Stories and Walt Disney's Uncle Scrooge, both described by Clark as "monthly 64-page prestige-format books at $6.95, which is the same price they were when last produced, in 1998". Other titles followed, and Gemstone held their license until early 2009.

==== Overstreet Comic Book Price Guide ====
The (Official) Overstreet Comic Book Price Guide was first published by Robert M. Overstreet in 1970 as one of the earliest authorities on American comic book industry grading and collection values. Overstreet sold his company to Gemstone in 1994, but continued to "serve as author and/or publisher of Geppi's Entertainment Publishing & Auctions' line of books." Publication of the Price Guide was taken over by Gemstone in 1998, and the twenty-eighth edition to the present have been (co-)published by Geppi's Gemstone publications. The Guide's 55th edition was scheduled to be published by Gemstone Publishing in 2025 but has since been delayed to February 2026.

Overstreet also produced a variety of smaller publications, updating his yearly guides on a monthly schedule. The most recent of these—Overstreet's Comic Price Review—began publication from Gemstone in July 2003, and was a monthly publication designed to update the yearly price guide more regularly, as well as provide articles, analysis and various lists of comics prices.

Gemstone published more than a hundred issues of the magazine Comic Book Marketplace, a monthly magazine for comics fans focusing heavily on the Golden and Silver ages, while more popular magazines (such as Wizard) skew more recent in focus.

==== Future ====
In early 2009, the future of Gemstone Publishing was unclear, after reports of unpaid printing bills, particularly from the EC Archives. In April, Geppi responded to the uncertainty, noting that while there had been "a reduction in staff at Gemstone", such moves did "not signal the end of Gemstone Publishing".

In 2008, Diamond introduced ComicSuite, an add-on application for Microsoft Dynamics' Retail Management System (RMS) software. Together, ComicSuite & RMS give specialty storeowners a point-of-sale (POS) system specifically geared towards their unique business model, offering a host of exclusive features that grant you direct communication with Diamond databases, making it easier than ever before to place orders, track inventory and maintain 'pull-and-hold' subscriptions for your customers."

== Geppi Family Enterprises subsidiaries ==
In 1995, Geppi founded Diamond International Galleries, which acquired Hake's Americana & Collectibles auction house (2004), and in 2005, Pennsylvania-based Morphy Auctions. In 1999, Geppi founded Diamond Select Toys, and in 2006 he founded Geppi's Entertainment Museum in Baltimore.

Geppi reorganized its holdings into Geppi Family Enterprises in 2015.

=== Alliance Game Distributors ===
Alliance Game Distributors is North America's largest distributor of tabletop games—role-playing games, collectible card games, miniature wargames, board games, and related merchandise—and the publisher of Game Trade Magazine. Alliance was acquired by Diamond in August 2000, two years after being formed by the merger of game distributors Chessex and The Armory.

=== Diamond Select Toys & Collectibles ===
Envisioned to create collectibles for children and adults, DST was founded in 1999 and has since licensed a variety of pop culture properties, including Marvel Comics, Transformers, G.I. Joe: A Real American Hero, Star Wars, Star Trek, Stargate, Ghostbusters, Halo, Buffy the Vampire Slayer, Indiana Jones, Battlestar Galactica, 24 and Back to the Future. While they also make action figures in a variety of sizes, as well as banks, busts, statues and prop replicas, many of their licensed properties are released in the form of Minimates, which has helped make Minimates one of the most prolific and diverse block figure toy lines in the world. In 2007, after years of partnership, Diamond Select Toys made a move to acquire select assets of New York-based design house Art Asylum, the creators of Minimates and DST has since developed Minimates based on its own concepts, under the brands Minimates M.A.X. and Calico Jack's Pirate Raiders.

=== Diamond International Galleries ===
In 1995, Geppi "opened Diamond International Galleries", a showplace for comics and collectibles, part of Geppi's attempts to "see... collectibles attain serious respect". Nine years later, Diamond International Galleries purchased "one of the country’s first, and most respected, collectibles auction houses: Hake's Americana & Collectibles." In 2005, Geppi added the "Denver, Pennsylvania-based Morphy Auctions" to his growing stable of parts of the collectibles market, which already included publishing the main comics price guide: The Overstreet Comic Book Price Guide.

Geppi describes his International Galleries as being "at the heart of many significant opportunities to preserve, promote and present historical comic character collectibles", an endeavor that led to his establishing Geppi's Entertainment Museum. Geppi's galleries showcase much of his private collection, including comics, movie posters, toys, original artwork by individuals including "Carl Barks, Gustav Tengren (sic), Alex Ross, Murphy Anderson, Joe Shuster, Joe Simon and Charles Schulz".

Diamond International Galleries has assisted "in such projects as DC's Archive series", as well as hosting industry events.

=== Geppi's Entertainment Museum ===
Geppi's Entertainment Museum was a museum in Baltimore, Maryland, tracing the history of pop culture in American over the last four hundred years. Its collections included comic books, magazines, movies, newspapers, television, radio and video game memorabilia, including comic books, movie posters, toys, buttons, badges, cereal boxes, trading cards, dolls and figurines. The majority of the exhibits came from Geppi's private collection, while Geppi's daughter Melissa "Missy" Geppi-Bowersox became the executive vice-president of the museum in 2007, after Wendy Kelman left the museum on August 31, 2007, to start her own tourism consulting firm. The museum's curator was Dr. Arnold T. Blumberg, former editor at Geppi's Gemstone Publishing. The museum closed in June 2018. Geppi donated much of his collection to the Library of Congress.

== See also ==
- List of book distributors
