= Capital City Distribution =

American comic book distributor

- Industry: Comics
- Founded: 1980; 46 years ago in Madison, Wisconsin, U.S.
- Founder: Milton Griepp, John Davis
- Defunct: 1996; 30 years ago
- Fate: Acquisition by Diamond Comic Distributors
- Headquarters: Madison, Wisconsin
- Key people: Griepp, Davis, Richard Bruning
- Revenue: $150 million (1996)
- Subsidiaries: Capital Comics

Capital City Distribution was a Madison, Wisconsin–based comic book distributor which operated from 1980 to 1996 when they were acquired by rival Diamond Comic Distributors. Under the name Capital Comics, they also published comics from 1981 to 1984.

During most of its years of operation, Capital City introduced many supply chain innovations and controlled much of the American Midwest's comics distribution market. More so than their rivals Diamond and Heroes World Distribution, Capital City supported independent publishers as much as big mainstream companies like DC Comics and Marvel Comics.

Capital City also published over 400 pages of printed material a month, including Internal Correspondence, which provided sales figures to their clients; and Advance Comics, their monthly catalog showcasing upcoming comic books, toys, and other pop-culture related items it distributed to comic book specialty shops.

== Distributor ==
=== Origins ===
In the 1970s, Milton Griepp and John Davis were running a small Madison-based distributor called Wisconsin Independent News Distributors (WIND). Forced to sell their assets to Big Rapids Distribution, Griepp and Davis later turned the tables in 1980 when they took over much of Big Rapids' bankrupt business to form Capital City.

One of Capital City's first acts was to utilize the personnel of another former Big Rapids' acquisition, Well News Co. of Columbus, Ohio, to become the nucleus of an early distribution branch. In 1982, Capital City acquired the Berkeley, California-based Common Ground Distributors, which had been started by Robert Beerbohm in the late 1970s (and had been initially supplied by Big Rapids).

Capital City's Wisconsin location was relatively near World Color Press's main printing plant in Sparta, Illinois. During that period World Color printed most American comic books, including those of the two industry giants Marvel and DC. By 1982, Capital City operated out of a large warehouse in Madison that they shared with their largest account, mail order retailer Westfield Comics.

=== 1984 expansion and rise to prominence ===
Griepp became Capital City's CEO in 1984. That same year, with the demise of one of the larger independent publisher/distributors, Pacific Comics, Pacific's distribution centers and warehouses were purchased by Capital City and rival distributor Bud Plant Inc. Capital City also opened an expanded facility in Sparta, Illinois, in the old space of another defunct rival, Sea Gate Distributors, alongside the comic-book printing plant.

By 1988, Capital City and its main surviving rival Diamond Comic Distributors had control of at least 70% of the comics distribution market between them.

Capital was large enough to host its own name-branded trade shows beginning in 1988. These were held annually through 1995.

In 1994, Capital created controversy by announcing penalties for publishers who didn't deliver their products within promised deadlines; this move followed an industry-wide push for 30-day returnability, a practice formerly in use when comics were primarily distributed in newsstands.

By this point, Capital City's Canadian affiliate, STV, had warehouses in Toronto, Montreal, and Quebec City, and Capital City had another freight forwarder operating out of Seattle, Washington.

=== Acquisition by Diamond ===
1995 saw a major restructuring of the direct market distribution system, caused by Marvel Comics's late-1994 purchase of third-ranked distributor Heroes World Distribution and decision to distribute its titles in-house. Faced with the loss of one-third of its business (Marvel's market share) Diamond reacted by outbidding Capital City for exclusive deals with Marvel's main rival DC Comics, and despite intense efforts on the part of Davis and Griepp, Dark Horse Comics and Image Comics as well.

Capital City reacted by suing Marvel for the loss of their business, resulting in a settlement allowing them to continue distributing Marvel product until October 1995 (for everyone else, Marvel went exclusive with Heroes World starting in July). In addition, Capital City was able to sign exclusive deals with Kitchen Sink Press, TSR, and Viz Comics—as well as acquiring the Gary, Indiana-based distributor Friendly Frank's. Nonetheless, by 1996 Capital faced the choice between bankruptcy and selling out.

In July 1996 Capital City was acquired by Diamond. At the time of sale, Capital had over $150 million in annual sales. The purchase price was not disclosed, but the acquisition brought an estimated $50 million in sales revenue to Diamond, and effectively awarded Diamond complete control of the comics distribution system. Most of Capital City's 100 employees in Madison and another 100 in Sparta lost their jobs in the deal, though a few key staff members, including co-founder John Davis, joined Diamond's staff.

After selling Capital, Griepp became an industry consultant, and since early 2001, has operated ICv2 ("Internal Correspondence vol. 2"), an online trade magazine covering "geek culture".

== Publisher ==
In 1981, Capital City decided to enter the comic book publishing field as well. Under the name Capital Comics, they launched a black-and-white comics title, Nexus, a futuristic superhero series by Mike Baron and Steve Rude, and distributed it through their own system.

Richard Bruning was a key part of Capital Comics' staff, acting as editor-in-chief and art director until the company ceased operation in 1984. Besides Nexus, the other titles published by Capital were Badger and Whisper. In 1984, after publishing only a handful of issues of their three titles, Capital shut down its publishing operation. Its titles were taken over by the new independent publisher First Comics.

=== Titles published ===
- Nexus: two series, 1981 and 1983, nine issues
- Badger: 1983, four issues
- Whisper: 1983, two issues

== See also ==
- List of book distributors
