= Phil Seuling =

American comic book fan convention organizer (1934–1984)

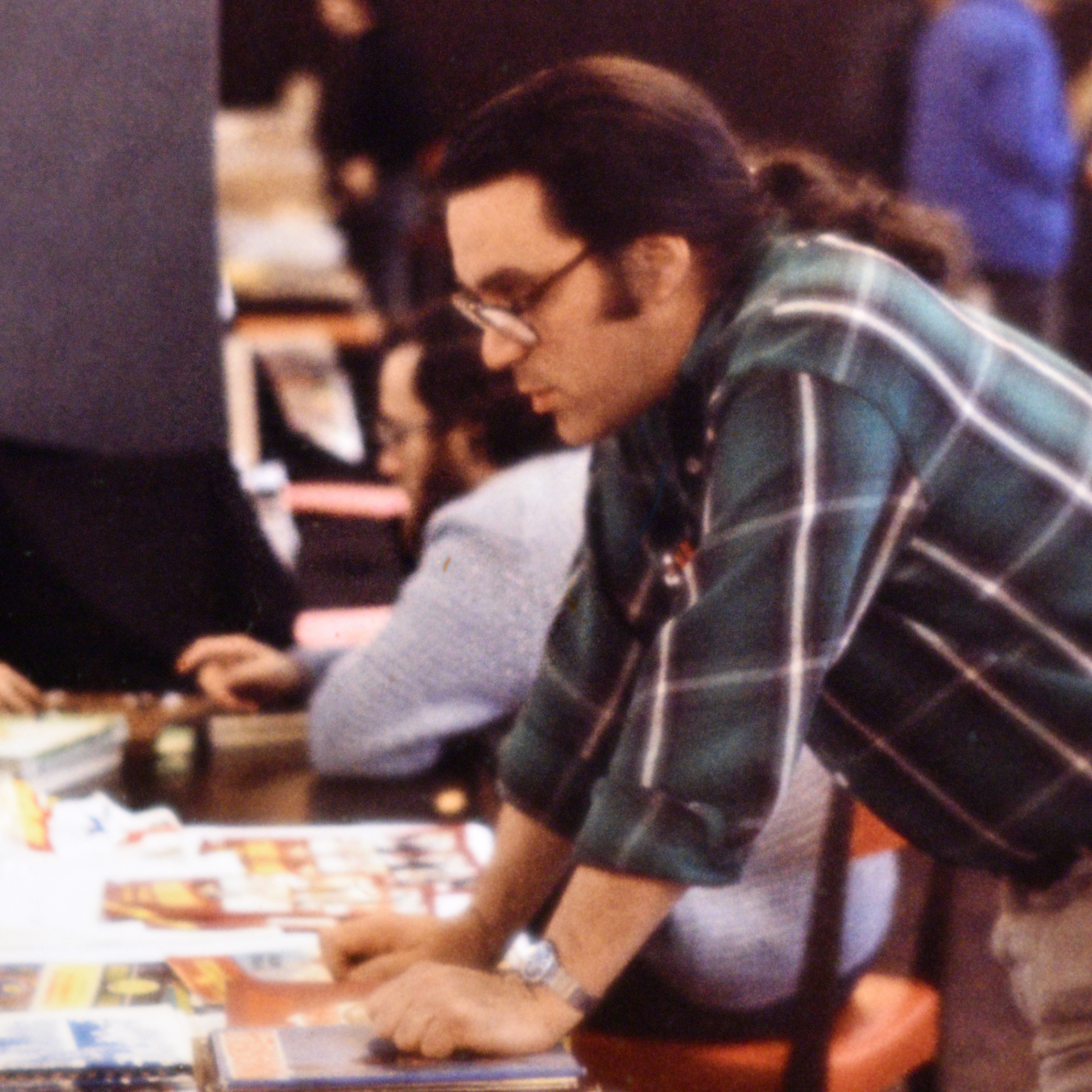
- Seuling in 1974
- Born: Philip Nicholas Seuling; January 20, 1934; New York City, U.S.
- Died: August 21, 1984 (aged 50); New York City, U.S.
- Education: City College of New York
- Occupations: Comic book distributor; convention organizer
- Years active: 1958—1984
- Spouse: Carole Seuling
- Children: 2

Philip Nicholas Seuling (/ˈsjuːlɪŋ/; January 20, 1934 – August 21, 1984) was an American comic book fan convention organizer and comics distributor primarily active in the 1970s. Seuling was the organizer of the annual New York Comic Art Convention, originally held in New York City every July 4 weekend throughout the 1970s. Later, with his Sea Gate Distributors company, Seuling developed the concept of the direct market distribution system for getting comics directly into comic book specialty shops, bypassing the then established newspaper/magazine distributor method, where no choices of title, quantity, or delivery directions were permitted.

== Biography ==
=== Early life ===
Seuling was born in the Bensonhurst neighborhood of Brooklyn, New York, and spent his entire life as a resident of that borough. He had a sister, Barbara and a brother Dennis, 13 years younger. He graduated from the City College of New York with a Bachelor of Arts degree, and earned several credits beyond.

=== Comics retailer ===
In 1958, he and a friend began buying and selling back-issue comic books, though his primary career was as an English teacher at Brooklyn's Lafayette High School. By 1970, Seuling was also operating the After Hours Book Shop in Brooklyn.

=== Comic Art Convention ===
In 1968, Seuling—who as a sideline was president of the newly founded but short-lived Society for Comic Art Research and Preservation, Inc. (SCARP)—staged the First International Convention of Comic Art under that organization's auspices, holding it at New York City's Statler Hilton Hotel. He held another comics convention at that hotel the following year, launching the New York Comic Art Convention series. On March 11, 1973, Seuling was arrested at the Second Sunday monthly comic book show for allegedly "selling indecent material to a minor". Seuling wrote a guest editorial in Warren Publishing's black-and-white horror-comics magazine Vampirella #25 detailing his experience and denying the claim he had sold an underground comic book to someone under 18.

=== Other activities ===
Seuling performed as a voice actor in Ralph Bakshi's 1972 Fritz the Cat movie, doing voices for two characters. He later voiced another one of our antagonists in Ralph Bakshi's Wizards (1977).

In 1974, at the Brooklyn Museum's Community Gallery, he staged the exhibit "Brooklyn's Comic Book Artists", featuring artwork by 13 comics artists who were born or lived in Brooklyn. Identified by neighborhood on the poster for the show, these included Neal Adams, then living in the Coney Island neighborhood; Will Eisner; Carmine Infantino, of Greenpoint; Joe Kubert; Harvey Kurtzman, who lived along Eastern Parkway; and Gray Morrow, formerly of East Flatbush.

Seuling appeared on the July 28, 1977 episode of the Mike Douglas Show to discuss comic book collecting and conventions along with a surprise appearance by Wendy Pini cosplaying as Red Sonja.

=== Sea Gate Distributors ===
Sea Gate Distributors
- Type: Comic book distributor
- Industry: Comics
- Founded: 1972; 54 years ago
- Founder: Phil Seuling
- Defunct: 1985; 41 years ago
- Headquarters: Brooklyn, New York
- Key people: Phil Seuling (founder)

In 1972, Seuling founded Sea Gate Distributors, named after the Brooklyn community Sea Gate, where he lived as an adult. Seuling cut deals with Archie, DC, Marvel, and Warren to ship their comic books from a new distribution center in Sparta, Illinois beginning in Fall 1973, thereby developing the concept of the direct market distribution system for getting comics directly into comic book specialty shops, bypassing the then established newspaper/magazine distributor method. The move from newsstand distribution to the direct market (nonreturnable, heavily discounted, direct purchasing of comics from publishers) went hand-in-hand with the growth of specialty comics shops that catered to collectors who could then buy back issues months after a newsstand issue had disappeared.

Comics historian Mark Evanier, noting the significance, wrote that

. . . it became apparent that the old method was being destroyed, with or without selling books the Seuling way, so DC, Marvel and other companies tried it. Within a year, around 25% of all comic books were being sold via 'direct' distribution, through Seuling's company and about a dozen others, with 75% still on conventional newsstands. Within ten years, those percentages were reversed. Today [in 2004], the 'direct market' is the primary market.

Seuling ran Sea Gate with his then-girlfriend Jonni Levas. A key element of Sea Gate's new distribution system was a prepay requirement for customers, which, given the low margins of comics retailing at the time (and the fact that many books shipped late), was onerous for many of the stores. By the late 1970s, however, thanks to Seuling's changes to distribution—and the merchandizing success of such comic-book-styled films as Star Wars and Superman—comics were selling well: in the six years between 1974 and 1980, U.S. "comic or fantasy-related specialty shops" rose from 200 or 300 to around 1500.

In late 1977 or early 1978, Sea Gate set up regional sub-distributors who were buying product at a 50% discount. This reduced Seuling's paperwork and enabled the sub-distributors to sell smaller orders than Sea Gate's minimum of five copies of each comic book title.

Seuling maintained a virtual monopoly on comics distribution, until a lawsuit brought by New Media/Irjax in 1978. Irjax sued DC, Marvel, Archie, and Warren for their anti-competitive arrangement with Seagate. As a result of the suit, Irjax eventually acquired "a sizable chunk of the direct-distribution market," and many of Seulings's sub-distributors left Sea Gate to become independent distributors.

=== Death ===
Seuling died of the rare liver disease sclerosing cholangitis on August 21, 1984. The following year, Sea Gate closed down. Distribution competitors Bud Plant, Inc., and Capital City Distribution opened "an expanded facility in Sea Gate's old space in Sparta, alongside the [defunct publisher Pacific Comics'] printing plant."

== Personal life ==
By 1957, Seuling was married to Carole Seuling, with whom he had two daughters, Gwenn and Heather. The couple grew apart as Phil became more interested in hippie culture, separating in 1971 and eventually getting a divorce but remaining close. Carole would do a small amount of writing for comics, including co-creating, with artist George Tuska, Marvel Comics' jungle-girl heroine Shanna the She-Devil in 1972. Seuling entered a romantic relationship with Jonni Levas, a former student who was instrumental in running Sea Gate.

== Awards ==
Seuling was presented with an Inkpot Award at the 1974 San Diego Comic-Con. In 1985, he was posthumously named as one of the honorees by DC Comics in the company's 50th anniversary publication Fifty Who Made DC Great.

== See also ==
- List of book distributors
- Fifty Who Made DC Great
