= Comic book price guide =

Comic book price guides are publications, generally released monthly, quarterly, or yearly, that detail the changes in the resale value of a comic over a period of time. Price guides are used by collectors looking to sell their collection or determine their collection’s worth for insurance purposes. They are also resources for collectors and enthusiasts seeking information on topics such as storylines, writers and artists, or the original cover price of a comic.

Each collector will have his or her own preference regarding which authority to follow, but popular and respected guides have included The Official Overstreet Comic Book Price Guide, Comics Buyer's Guide magazine, Wizard Magazine, the Comics Buyer's Guide Standard Catalog of Comic Books, and Human Computing’s ComicBase, an inventory/databasing software program. Popular online price guides include comicbookrealm.com (free), ComicsPriceGuide.com (free and paid services), RarityGuide (free and paid), and GPAnalysis.com specifically for CGC (certified) Comics (paid).

Long-standing publications include Overstreet, which has been running for over 35 years, or the more recent Standard Catalog of Comic Books. Grand Comics Database and comicbookrealm.com allow users to search for characters by appearances and deaths. The Big Comic Book DataBase combines a searchable database of per issue character and creator information and a linked price guide.

Online platforms like the Grand Comics Database, comicbookrealm.com and Collectionary 4Comics provide users with rapid access to character appearances and deaths. Additionally, the Big Comic Book Database merges a searchable database featuring character and creator details per issue with a linked price guide, offering a comprehensive resource for enthusiasts.

The advent of certification enabled increased liquidity of comic books by removing disputes over grading and by disclosing restoration, and accelerated sales of comic books through online auction sites such as eBay or Heritage Auction Galleries. Certification is also valued by some comic price guide providers, as certification leaves the perception of removing the uncertainty about the actual grade of the comic book being sold, although, because books that are certified are graded by numerous different individuals, the dependability of these services is not universally agreed upon. Individual and/or aggregated reports of certified comic book sales are available online.

== History ==
Beginning in the early 1960s comics collectors (who often traded and sold to each other) were growing in number, and the number of comics dealers began to increase as well. This expansion was accompanied by an increase in the number of comics dealers operating within the industry. In 1965, Michael Cohen and Tom Horsky published what is considered the first comics price guide, the one-shot digest The Argosy Price Guide (specifically for Hollywood, California's, Argosy Book Shop).

Comic back-issue prices had stabilized by the end of the 1960s. In 1970, Jerry Bails, who had recently published the Collector’s Guide to the First Heroic Age, was considering creating a comic book price guide. He was contacted by Bob Overstreet, who was doing the same thing. Bails' extensive notes, supplemented by Overstreet's study of dealer listings, "became a backbone to the Overstreet Comic Book Price Guide." Overstreet's guide instantly became an invaluable resource tool for comic book collectors.

The Overstreet guide excluded the entire category of underground comix from its listings. This void was first addressed by Jay Kennedy in 1982 with The Official Underground And Newave Comix Price Guide, and while out of print is a valuable resource for information about the artists and publishers. In 2006, Overstreet advisor and contributor Dan Fogel's Hippy Comix, Inc. published Fogel's Underground Comix Price Guide, with 2010 to see a supplement magazine adding minicomics and British undergrounds alongside the latest pricing data.

With the advent of online auctioning services like eBay, price guides have seen dramatic declines in sales because their price listings were not reflective of the actual sale prices of comics. Shortly thereafter, Comics Buyer's Guide magazine and the CBG Standard Catalog of Comic Books started reporting actual completed auction results from eBay, covering periods longer than eBay's results are online. The 2005 edition of the Standard Catalog is 1,624 pages long and reports results back to 2002. The current online price guide for slabbed comics is GPAnalysis, which collects data of actual verified sales from several pre-approved sellers and auction houses.

An established independent company, such as Comic Guaranty LLC (CGC) or Comic Book Certification Service (CBCS) provides third party grading services for comics. Comic books can be sent to these companies for independent, impartial certification, including grading, restoration check and encapsulation within a tamper-evident protective holder.

== Comic book grading scale ==
Dealers and graders may often disagree with some grading classifications. Grading of comics can be subjective, although there are basic agreed upon standards within the industry. There is a numeric system which corresponds to a titled grading system. Both range from 0.5 (Poor) to 10.0 (Mint or "Gem Mint"). Many collectors and companies will use only numeric grading or terminology. Titled mixed grades, such as Very Good/Fine (5.0) are always titled with the lower grade followed by the larger grade. Within the grades, there might also be descriptive notes because comics with the same technical grade may have different reasons for that grade and many collectors have their own biases of what flaws are more acceptable than others.

== Terminology ==
- Title is the name of a comic book series. For example, Action Comics is a title. Within this title, there have been over 1,000 issues.
- Issue is a single installment of a title, usually with its own number. Examples are Action Comics #23 or The Amazing Spider-Man #42. A volume number may also be included, such as Punisher Vol. 1 #23.
- Grading is the process of evaluating the condition and consequent value of a comic book. A detailed explanation of how to determine a comic book’s condition based on the established grades is generally included in a comic book pricing guide. A copy that falls between grades may be noted with a $+$ or a $-$ symbol. These terms are as follows:

Grade	Abbreviation
Mint	MT or M
Near Mint	NM
Very Fine	VF
Fine	FN
Very Good	VG
Good	GD or G
Fair	FR
Poor	PR

== Notable price guides ==
=== Printed guides ===
- The Official Overstreet Comic Book Price Guide
- Comics Buyer's Guide
- Comics Values Monthly (Defunct)
- Standard Catalog of Comic Books
- Wizard: The Guide to Comics (Defunct)
- British Comics, Story Papers, Picture Libraries, Girls Papers, American Reprints, Facsmilies, Giveaways Price Guide (1982)

=== Online guides ===
- ComicBase
- Comics Price Guide
- Covrprice
- GP Analysis for CGC-graded Comics
- Nostomania
- Overstreet Access
- Quality Comix
- Sell My Comic Books
- Zap-Kapow Comics

=== Mobile app guides ===
- Collectionary 4Comics

== See also ==
- Direct market
- Comic book collecting
