= First appearance =

First piece of media featuring a fictional character

In comic books and other stories with a long history, first appearance refers to the first issue to feature a fictional character. These issues are often highly valued by collectors due to their rarity and iconic status.

== Reader interest in first appearances ==
Collectors value first appearances for their rarity and historical value, while many regular readers are interested in viewing how their favorite characters were originally portrayed. Reprints of first appearances are often published, both as single comic books and in trade paperbacks, usually with other early appearances of the character. Marvel Comics' "Essential" line has become popular by giving readers an affordable glimpse into characters' early history.

Historically, first appearances tell the origin story for the character, although some, such as Batman and Green Goblin, remained dubious figures for several issues. Modern writers prefer to tell a character's origin across an entire story arc or keep a newly introduced character mysterious until a "secret origin" issue. Some fans consider this a gimmick and prefer the older method.

The artistic merit of many first appearances is debatable. The events portrayed in most famous first appearances are continuously retconed, rebooted, or expanded upon by subsequent writers. Like many golden and silver age comics, first appearances often become dated and do not fit the modern portrayal of the character.

Some first appearances are considered classics, however. 1990s-era Spider-Man writer Howard Mackie said that his favorite story featuring the character was his first appearance and origin story in Amazing Fantasy #15 (August 1962), stating that writer Stan Lee and artist Steve Ditko "gave us everything we needed, I wanted or could ask for in the least possible space. Every single person who retells the origin never improves on the original, they simply expand it".

== Monetary value of first appearance issues ==
First appearances of popular characters are among the most valuable comic books in existence. Of the "ten most valuable comic books" listed in the spring 2002 issue of Overstreet Comic Book Price Guide, seven are first appearances of popular superheroes. Another, Marvel Comics #1 (October 1939), is the first appearance of the Golden Age Human Torch, but is more noteworthy as the first comic published by Marvel Comics.

It can take many years for a character to attain sufficient popularity after their first appearance to be considered "iconic". By the point a character reaches that level of popularity, it is common for few copies of their first appearance issues to remain. Furthermore, even fewer of those remaining copies will be in the pristine condition prized by collectors. What few remain can be worth thousands of dollars to interested collectors. For example, in 2004, a copy of Flash Comics #1 (January 1940), the first appearance of The Flash, was auctioned for $42,000 and a copy of Captain America Comics #1 (March 1941), the first appearance of Captain America sold for $64,400. In 2010, another copy of Flash Comics #1 sold privately for $450,000.

The first appearance of Superman, Action Comics #1 (June 1938), has been regarded as the "holy grail" of comic books due to its cultural significance and rarity; fewer than one hundred copies are thought to exist. Superman is widely considered to have solidified, if not created, the superhero archetype; therefore, his first appearance is not only important to fans of the character but to fans of superheroes and comic books as a whole. Well-preserved copies of Action Comics #1 have been sold at auction for record-breaking prices. A copy graded at 8.0 ("very fine") on the 10-point scale typically used by collectors was sold at auction for $1,000,000 in 2010. Even a copy graded at a much lower 5.5 ("fine minus") sold for $956,000 in 2016.

Shortly after the record-breaking million-dollar sale of Action Comics #1 in 2010, a copy of Detective Comics #27 featuring the first appearance of Batman was sold for $1,075,000 in a Heritage auction.

Several factors determine the value of a first appearance. All values are according to ComicsPriceGuide.com and are for editions certified by the Certified Collectibles Group:

- The importance of the character(s) that debuted; the first appearance of Spider-Man in fine condition is listed at $45,150; the first appearance of the similarly popular Iron Man, in the same condition, is listed at $3,837; and the first appearances of most characters are not valued significantly higher than other comics published the same month.
- The rarity of the comic book itself; comics from the Golden Age are usually more valuable than later comic books because they are older and fewer copies survive. Spider-Man is more popular than The Spectre but Spider-Man's 1962 first appearance is valued at $45,150 while a copy of The Spectre's 1940 debut, in fine condition, is valued at $54,000. Also, first appearances often lack value if they are relatively recent issues of high-profile, best-selling titles. Except during a 1990s collector's bubble, the first appearances of several Image Comics characters and newer X-Men have not been as valuable as one may expect for such popular characters because those comics were widely produced.
- Other reasons for historical importance; The Fantastic Four (November 1961) #1 is not only the first appearance of the eponymous group but also represents a turning point in the history of Marvel Comics and is the first issue of a long-running series.
- Occasionally, a comic book is the first appearance of more than one important character. Usually the characters are related, such as X-Men #1 (September 1963) that introduced the X-Men and their archenemy Magneto. In contrast, rarely a comic book is the first appearance of two unrelated, important characters, such as More Fun Comics #73 (November 1941) that introduced both Green Arrow and Aquaman, who have little relation to one another. This is also the case with Action Comics #1, which contained the first appearances of Zatara and Tex Thompson, as well as Superman.
- Occasionally a first appearance will lack the value expected for a character of such stature because the debut was not splashy. Wonder Woman, a popular and historically important hero, debuted in the anthology title All Star Comics #8 (December 1941), and was not featured on the cover. This issue is valued at $30,000 in fine condition. Comparatively, the first appearances of equally (or even less) important peers Green Lantern and The Flash, boldly introduced on their covers, are worth $131,250 and $69,000, respectively. Arguably, the first appearance of Wonder Woman is worth much less because she did not make a flashy debut that lent the comic book an air of history.
- As is the case with all collectibles, condition greatly affects the value of comic books, although considerable wear is expected for decades-old comics. Most comic books are worth more if their condition is certified and they are protectively packaged (or "slabbed") by the Certified Collectibles Group, a professional grading service involved in the sale of most high-value comic books, although some fans accuse the group of inflating the value of comics.

== Ambiguous cases ==
While seemingly a simple concept, determining the first appearance may be complex. The following are instances in which a character's first appearance may be difficult to determine:

- Those unfamiliar to comics may assume that Iron Man's first appearance is The Invincible Iron Man #1 (May 1968), but in the golden and early silver ages of comic books, few superheroes debuted in magazines carrying their names. More often a character first appeared in a generically titled anthology series. If the character proved popular, a new series was launched. For example, Iron Man first appeared in Tales of Suspense #39 (March 1963) and appeared regularly in that series for five years before Marvel launched a series properly named Iron Man. Wonder Woman, Spider-Man, Thor, and many others also first appeared in anthology series.
- The first appearance of "all-star" teams is given as the first instance in which that team banded together regardless of whether or not it consists of previously existing characters. The first appearance of the Justice League is considered The Brave and the Bold #28 (May 1960), the issue in which they first operated as a group, although none of its members first appeared in that issue. Alternatively, X-Men #1 (September 1963) is both the first appearance of the X-Men and its original members.
- Sometimes a character first appears in the last page of an issue, foreshadowing a greater role in the next issue. Arguments may be made over whether the first appearance is the issue containing the final page cameo or the subsequent issue which more adequately introduced the character. Wolverine was first seen in the last page of The Incredible Hulk #180 (October 1974) but makes a more full appearance in issue #181 (November 1974). Some fans may consider The Incredible Hulk #180 Wolverine's first appearance, but most consider it #181. ComicsPriceGuide.com lists a copy of issue #180, rated very fine, at $149 and #181 at $2,075. Comparatively, The Incredible Hulk #179 (September 1974), which has no special importance, is listed at $11, so both types of first appearance add value to a comic book.
- Retconning can also complicate first appearances. Initially, Cable was portrayed as a wholly new character, first appearing in The New Mutants #87 (March 1990), but writers later changed his background, stating that Cable is an adult, time traveling Nathan Summers, the son of Cyclops and Madelyne Pryor, first seen in Uncanny X-Men #201 (January 1986). Both issues could be given as the first appearance of Cable. Further complicating the matter, Cable was seen in a cameo at the end of The New Mutants #86 (February 1990).
- Some superhero identities are used by more than one character. The original Green Lantern (Alan Scott) first appeared in All-American Comics #16 (April 1940). During the Silver Age, Green Lantern, like many DC heroes, was rebooted with a totally new identity. The second Green Lantern, Hal Jordan, debuted in Showcase #22 (October 1959). All-American Comics #16 is still considered the first appearance of Green Lantern, both of the original title-bearer and the superhero identity itself. To avoid confusion, Showcase #22 is called the first appearance of Hal Jordan, of Green Lantern or of the Silver Age Green Lantern.
- Occasionally, a character will appear in the background of a comic book before fully introduced. Spider-Man's early love interest Liz Allan is first addressed by name in The Amazing Spider-Man #4 (September 1963), but an unnamed character in Amazing Spider-Man #1 (March 1963) is, based on her appearance and dialogue, probably Allan. Also, Amazing Fantasy #15 (August 1962), shows an unnamed character who resembles Allan. Thus, Allan's first appearance may be given as any of the three.
- Some characters appear in more than one continuity. While the first appearance of Nightcrawler is Giant-Size X-Men #1 (May 1975), the first appearance of the character's Ultimate Marvel counterpart is Ultimate X-Men #6 (August 2001).
- Occasionally, new characters are created for television or film adaptations of a franchise and are later added to the comic book continuity. The Batman adversary Harley Quinn debuted in the 1992 Batman: The Animated Series episode "Joker's Favor". Her first appearance in comic format was the graphic novel The Batman Adventures #12, which took place in the continuity of Batman: The Animated Series. Her first appearance in the regular "DC Universe" was the 1999 one-shot Batman: Harley Quinn. Thus, her first appearance is technically "Joker's Favor", her first appearance in a comic book was The Batman Adventures #12 and her first appearance in the regular DC Comics continuity was Batman: Harley Quinn. Similarly, Firestar first appeared in Spider-Man and His Amazing Friends #1, which adapted the first episode of the TV series. Her first Earth-616 appearance was in the Uncanny X-Men #193.
- Rarely, a character debuts in a publisher's foreign branch and then appears in a domestic series. Psylocke first appeared in Captain Britain #8 (December 1976), an original series of Marvel UK not widely available outside Great Britain. Her debut in an American series was The New Mutants Annual #2 (1986). Her first appearance is sometimes given as either but more correctly it is Captain Britain #8 while The New Mutants Annual #2 is her first US appearance.
- Some characters appear first in a normal supporting role before becoming a superhero or villain. For example, Roderick Kingsley first appeared as a minor supporting character in The Spectacular Spider-Man #43 (June 1980), but he would later take on the villainous role of the Hobgoblin in The Amazing Spider-Man #238 (March 1983), becoming one of Spider-Man's most dangerous foes. The latter issue, featuring his first appearance as the Hobgoblin, is worth more than his original debut.

== First appearances of popular heroes, villains and teams ==
Character(s)	First appearance	Cover date	Publisher
Superman	Action Comics #1	June 1938	DC Comics
Batman	Detective Comics #27	May 1939	DC Comics
Sandman (Wesley Dodds)	Adventure Comics #40	July 1939	DC Comics
Namor	Marvel Comics #1	October 1939	Timely Comics
Jay Garrick/Flash; Hawkman	Flash Comics #1	January 1940	All-American Publications
Captain Marvel	Whiz Comics #2	February 1940	Fawcett Comics
Robin	Detective Comics #38	May 1940	DC Comics
The Spectre	More Fun Comics #52	February 1940	DC Comics
Lex Luthor	Action Comics #23	May 1940	DC Comics
Joker; Catwoman	Batman #1	Spring 1940	DC Comics
Green Lantern	All-American Comics #16	July 1940	All-American Publications
Captain America	Captain America Comics #1	March 1941	Timely Comics
Aquaman; Green Arrow	More Fun Comics #73	November 1941	DC Comics
Wonder Woman	All Star Comics #8	December 1941	All-American Publications
Black Canary	Flash Comics #86	August 1947	All-American Publications
Barry Allen/Flash	Showcase #4	October 1956	DC Comics
Justice League	The Brave and the Bold #28	May 1960	DC Comics
Fantastic Four	The Fantastic Four #1	November 1961	Marvel Comics
Hulk	The Incredible Hulk #1	May 1962	Marvel Comics
Doctor Doom	The Fantastic Four #5	June 1962	Marvel Comics
Spider-Man	Amazing Fantasy #15	August 1962	Marvel Comics
Thor	Journey into Mystery #83	August 1962	Marvel Comics
Iron Man	Tales of Suspense #39	March 1963	Marvel Comics
Doctor Strange	Strange Tales #110	July 1963	Marvel Comics
X-Men; Magneto	X-Men #1	September 1963	Marvel Comics
The Avengers	The Avengers #1	September 1963	Marvel Comics
Daredevil	Daredevil #1	April 1964	Marvel Comics
Teen Titans	The Brave and the Bold #54	July 1964	DC Comics
The Punisher	The Amazing Spider-Man #129	February 1974	Marvel Comics
Wolverine	The Incredible Hulk #181	October 1974	Marvel Comics
Teenage Mutant Ninja Turtles	Teenage Mutant Ninja Turtles #1	May 1984	Mirage Studios
Venom	The Amazing Spider-Man #300	May 1988	Marvel Comics
Deadpool	The New Mutants #98	February 1991	Marvel Comics

== See also ==
- Comic book collecting
- List of Marvel Comics first appearances
- List of Marvel Comics superhero debuts

== Notes ==
- Nicolas Cage's 9.0 graded Action Comics #1 sold in 2011.
- Batman #1, the first appearance of the Joker and Catwoman, is especially valuable since it is also the first issue of a long-running series and the first comic book to bear Batman's name as its title.
