= Brent Frankenhoff =

American author and editor

Brent Frankenhoff (born February 10, 1966) is an American author and editor of books and magazines about comic books, best known for his work on Comics Buyer's Guide and the Standard Catalog of Comic Books.

A collector of comic books since childhood, he joined Krause Publications in 1992 as an assistant to Don Thompson and Maggie Thompson. In 1995, he co-authored the first of a line of price guides, the Comic Book Checklist and Price Guide (now on its 15th edition). Named Comics Buyer's Guide's projects editor in 1998, Frankenhoff became editor of the journal in 2006. He worked with ComicBase creator Peter Bickford to develop a joint comics database, which Krause used to launch the Standard Catalog of Comic Books series in 2002. The fifth edition of that publication was issued as a DVD-ROM in 2008.
