= Alan Light (comics) =

American publisher and photographer

Alan L. Light
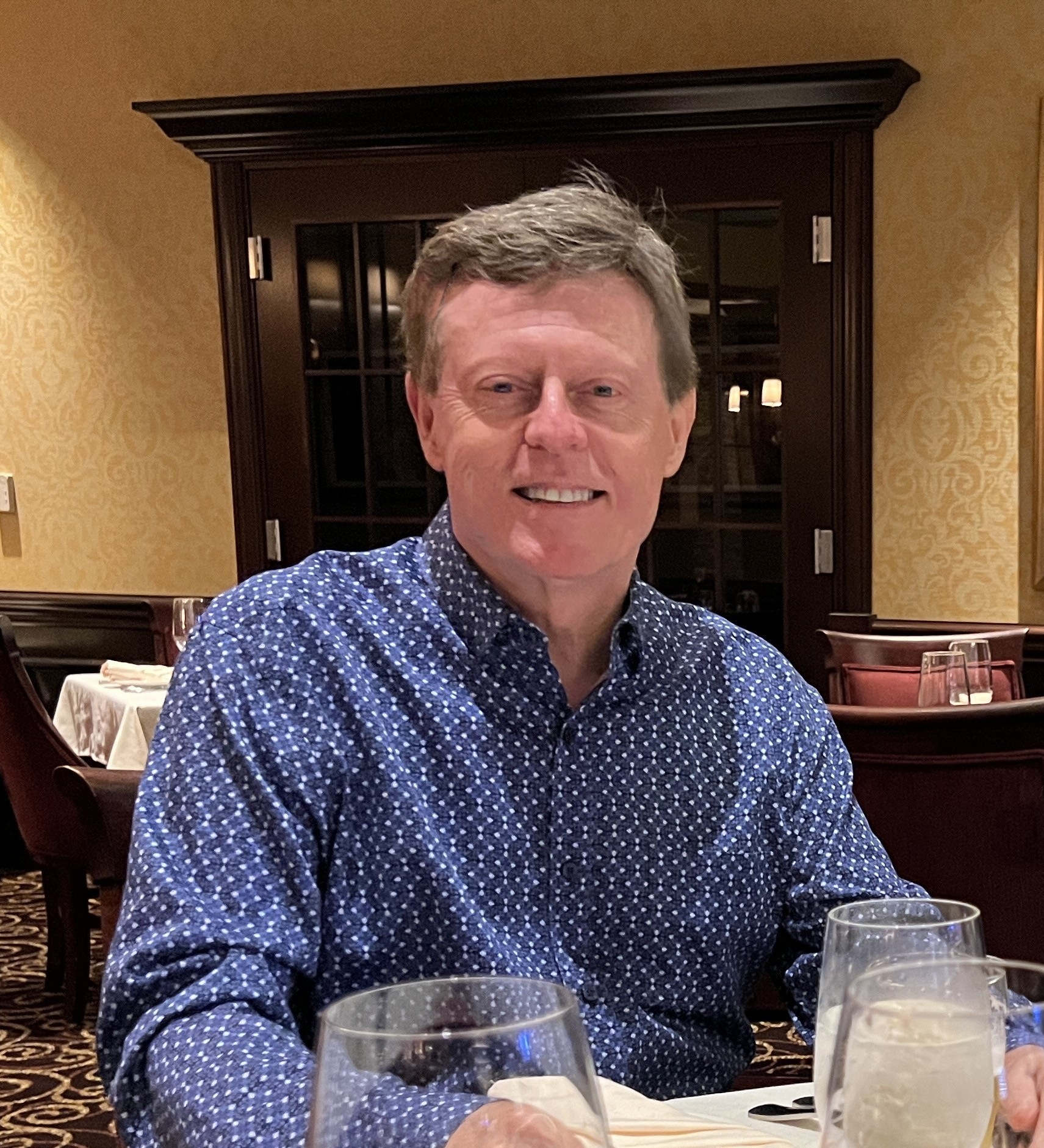
- Alan Light in 2025
- Born: September 15, 1953 (age 73) Illinois, U.S.
- Areas: Publisher, Editor
- Notable works: Comics Buyer's Guide; DynaPubs Enterprises; Film Collector's World
- Awards: Inkpot Award, 1975

Alan L. Light (born September 15, 1953) is an American publisher associated with comic book culture and fandom. As a teenager he founded The Buyer's Guide for Comic Fandom, which ran 1971–2013 and connected buyers and sellers of used comic books. longest-running periodical about the U.S. comic book industry. In 1983 he sold it (soon retitled Comics Buyer's Guide), which enabled him to travel extensively. As a hobby, Light obtained tickets to exclusive events like the Emmy Awards and Academy Awards to photograph celebrities, and has uploaded his work with a Creative Commons license.

== Comic book industry publishing ==
Alan Light launched two successful publications from his parents' home in East Moline, Illinois, starting with the comics fanzine All Dynamic Magazine when he was 16. At 17, he launched a sales-focused specialty newspaper geared toward comic book collectors, called The Buyer's Guide for Comic Fandom. It launched in February 1971 to facilitate buying and selling of secondhand comic books. Light solicited listings right away, and used listing fees to pay for printing, shipping, and other costs. After expanding circulation, and establishing a healthy marketplace, Light eventually charged for subscriptions.

=== Operations ===
He increased the frequency from monthly to twice-monthly. Don and Maggie Thompson wrote a column called "Beautiful Balloons". They administered the annual Goethe Awards for comic artists, a tradition that had started in their fanzine Newfangles. A news column by Murray Bishoff called "What Now?" was added in issue 26, which brought editorial content to a level that qualified as second class mail by the US Postal Service. Publishing increased to weekly in July 1975.

At San Diego Comic-Con in 1975, Light recorded the convention's speeches and panels, then compiled the highlights onto a 12-inch LP record that he sold. The record included an interview with Jerry Siegel who co-created Superman."

Additional columnists and contributors to The Buyer's Guide included Martin L. Greim, Shel Dorf, Peter David, Tony Isabella, Catherine Yronwode, and Heidi MacDonald; as well as cartoonists such as Marc Hansen, Dan Vebber, Fred Hembeck, Mark Martin, and Batton Lash. By 1976, Light had moved The Buyer's Guide headquarters to Rapids City, Illinois, and circulation was reported at 15,000 in 1978.

In 1983, after publishing 481 issues, Light sold The Buyer's Guide to Krause Publications, where it was renamed Comics Buyer's Guide and ran to 1699 issues total, ending in 2013.

=== Additional publications ===
From 1973 to 1976, Light published reprints from the Golden Age of Comic Books, including Flashback for superheros and Vintage Funnies. The project was DynaPubs Enterprises. Content included Flashback vol. 1 (2 issues, 1971), Golden Funnies (15 issues, June 1, 1973 – Sept. 7, 1973), Favorite Funnies (12 issues, Sept. 14, 1973 – Dec. 1973) and Vintage Funnies (85 issues, Sept. 14, 1973 – Apr. 25, 1975), and Flashback vol. 2 (38 issues, Nov. 1973 – 1976), as well as brief others:

- Feature Showcase (2 issues, 1974) — Buck Rogers and other classic comic strip reprints
- Special Edition Series (3 issues, 1974 – 1975) — Fawcett Comics and Quality Comics reprints

=== Film Collector's World ===
In 1976, Light added another tabloid to his publishing roster, Film Collector's World. It was initially edited by Don and Maggie Thompson, who wrote a column called "View from a Darkened Room."

Krause Publications bought Film Collector's World along with The Buyer's Guide in 1983; FCW was rechristened Movie Collector's World. Much later, the magazine was acquired by, and absorbed into, Classic Images.

=== Conflict with Gary Groth ===
Alan Light spent $12,000 in 1975 to purchase a competing publication, Nostalgia Journal, run by Gary Groth. Light renamed it The Comics Journal. Groth publicly accused Light of "expedient" business practices and other ruthless behavior. Groth's confrontations at conventions and collect calls, prompted Light to leave out Groth's listing from The Buyer's Guide despite Groth having paid. In Fandom: Confidential, Ron Frantz claimed that this led Groth to solicit subscriptions from a mailing list belonging to the group WE Seal of approval program, unauthorized behavior that Groth later claimed was a misunderstanding before he apologized and cut ties with the group.

He continued to denounced Light, and when Light sold The Buyer's Guide in 1983, Groth called him "fandom's first real business predator. His career of hustling is a monument to selfish opportunism and spiritual squalor." Light filed a libel suit, which was eventually dropped.

== Photography and later pursuits ==
"I wrote to the television academy and asked how to get tickets ... A guy wrote back and says that normally you can't buy them unless you're a member of the academy. But this person had family in the Quad-Cities and decided to give me four tickets."

— Alan Light, 1987

Alan Light began photographing celebrities as a hobby in 1976, when he and his mother attended a premiere and afterparty for the Barbra Streisand movie "A Star is Born". Light photographed Streisand, Chevy Chase, Gary Busey, Kris Kristofferson, Bert Convy, Ed McMahon, Rita Coolidge, Tony Orlando, and Gary Collins. He did the same at the premiere of F.I.S.T. starring Sylvester Stallone in 1978, then The Rose in 1979, where he photographed stars like Bette Midler.

In 1983, Light sold his publications and retired by the age of 30, later reflecting: "At times I miss it, but...l it was a very good offer." The sale enabled him to travel to more film industry events including his first award show, the 1987 Emmy Awards. "I wrote to the television academy and asked how to get tickets" "A guy wrote back and says that normally you can't buy them unless you're a member of the academy. But this person had family in the Quad-Cities and decided to give me four tickets." Light's request for tickets, which he sent by mail, was granted due to a lucky connection with the employee. He attended both the Emmy's ceremony and the subsequent Governor's Ball, and in addition to photographing stars such as Betty White and Michael J. Fox, he made friends with connections to award shows.

"Sometimes I wonder how I got to be so lucky. It's really kind of amazing."

— Alan Light, on meeting movie stars

He got tickets for the 60th Academy Awards in 1988 a "friend of a friend" who, every year, was given four tickets from Bette Davis. Light photographed stars including Pee-wee Herman, Liza Minnelli, Little Richard, and Cher. The next year in 1989, his friends from the Emmys were able to offer access to the 61st Oscars ceremony and three full days of rehearsals beforehand, where the casual environment was conducive to photography. In 1990, Light went to the American Music Awards in January, the Grammys in February, and the 62nd Academy Awards in March after a vacation in Hawaii. The Academy Awards tickets were $500.

In an interview with his local newspaper in 1990, Light reported that the friendliest stars were Michael Jackson, David Letterman, John Cleese, Tom Cruise, Gloria Estefan, and Jodie Foster, and that the least friendly celebrity had been Billy Crystal, with three rude interactions After attending the 1991 Emmys, Light said he would no longer attend the Governor's ball. Light later retired to Iowa City, Iowa.

== Awards ==
For his work promoting comics fandom, Light was given an Inkpot Award at the 1975 San Diego Comic-Con.

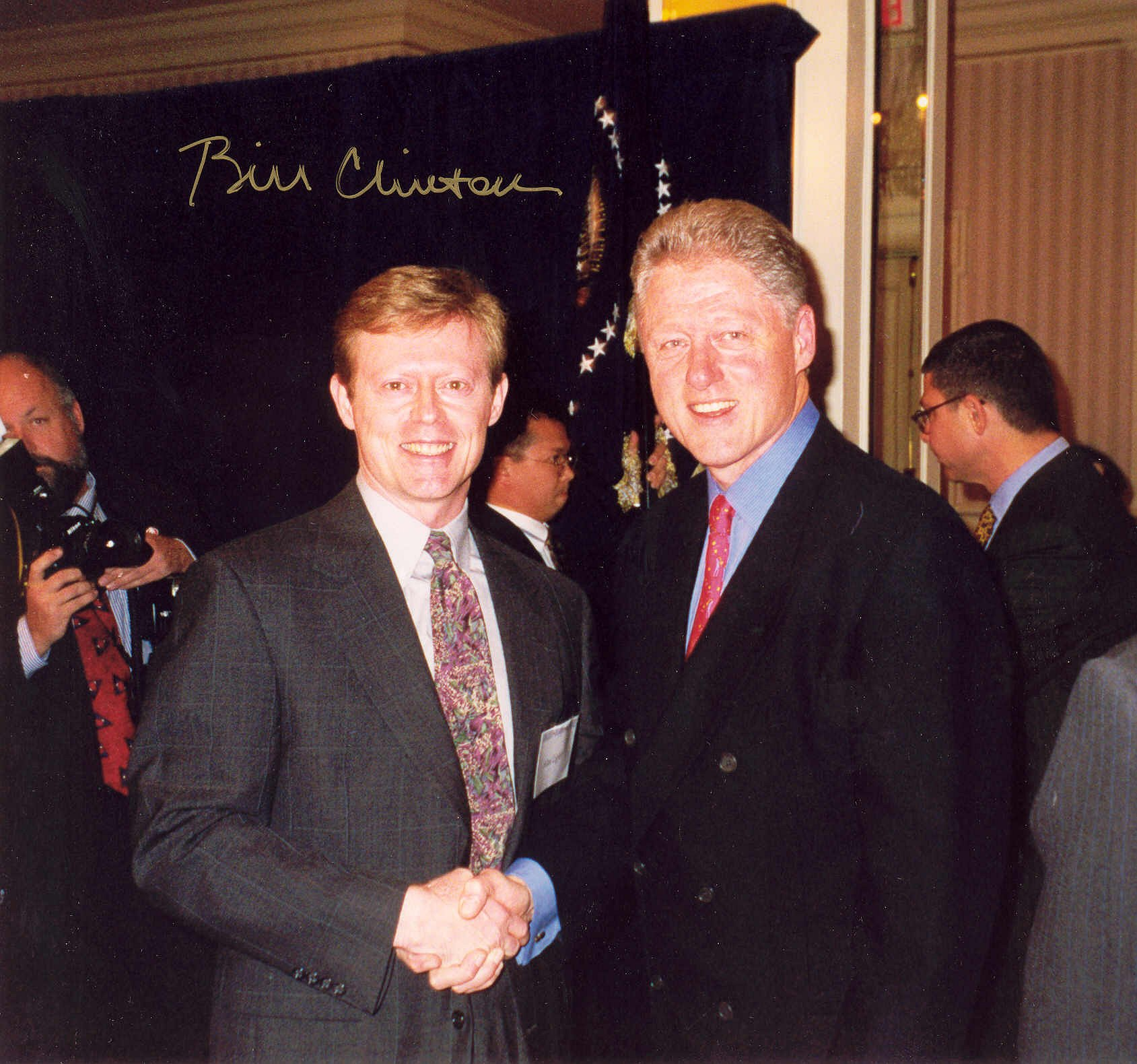
Alan Light with Bill Clinton in 1998
