= Comic book collecting =

Hobby collecting comic books

Comic book collecting is a hobby that treats comic books and related items as collectibles or artwork to be sought after and preserved. Though considerably more recent than the collecting of postage stamps (philately) or books (bibliophilia), it has a major following around the world today and is partially responsible for the increased interest in comics after the temporary slump experienced during the 1980s.

== Overview ==
Comics are collected for several possible reasons, including appreciation, nostalgia, financial profit, and completion of the collection. The comic book came to light in the pop culture arena in the 1930s due to the popularity of superhero characters Superman, Batman, and Captain Marvel. Since the 1960s, two publishers have dominated the American comic book industry: Marvel Comics, publisher of such comics as Spider-Man, X-Men, and Fantastic Four, and DC Comics, which publishes titles such as Superman, Batman, and Wonder Woman. Other large non-manga publishers include Image Comics, IDW, Valiant Comics, and Dark Horse Comics.

As comic books regained their popularity in the 1960s during the boom of the Silver Age, fans organized comic book conventions, where they could meet to discuss their favorite comics with each other and eventually with the creators themselves. As of 2010, numerous conventions and festivals are held around the world, with Comic-Con International, held annually in San Diego, being the largest and best-known convention in the United States.

While some people collect comic books for personal interest in the medium or characters, others prefer to collect for profit. To assist both types of comic book collector, comic book price guides are available and provide estimates of comic book values as well as information on comic book creators and characters. The price guides assign values for comic books based on demand, availability, and the copy's condition. The longest running price guide is the annual Overstreet Price Guide, first published in 1970. Another current monthly price guide is Comics Buyer's Guide. The growth of the Internet in the late 1990s saw development of online databases to track creator, character appearances, and storylines, as well as websites combining comic book price guides with personalized collection tracking to provide collection values in real-time. The Grand Comics Database is a popular online resource for comic book creator and character information. Popular online price guide and collection tracking services include comicbookrealm.com, comicspriceguide.com, and GPAnalysis. The increased popularity of online auctioning services like eBay or Heritage Auctions for buying and selling comic books has greatly increased the visibility of actual comic book sale prices, leading to improved price guide accuracy, particularly for online price guides such as comicspriceguide.com and GPAnalysis. GPA only tracks sales of slabbed books, and therefore is not an accurate indicator of overall comic sales.

In response to collectors' interest in preserving their collections, products designed for the protection and storage of comic books became available, including special bags; boxes; and acid-free "backing boards", designed to keep the comic book flat.

== History ==
=== Origins ===
Before the late 1960s, virtually no specialized comic stores existed and the notion of comics as collectible art was in its infancy. A few collector-based retail establishments existed, most notably Pop Hollinger's retail and mail order shop for new and used comics in Concordia, Kansas, which was in full swing by 1940. Claude Held had followed suit in Buffalo, New York, by 1946.

The origins of comic book collecting as an organized hobby has its roots in early science fiction fandom and comic book letters pages. In the early 1960s, DC Comics began publishing the full addresses of the people writing in, which allowed comic fans to reach out to each other. (Note: The first letters page with the letter writers' full addresses appeared in The Brave and the Bold #35 (May 1961).)

Adzines like Rocket's Blast Comicollector (RBCC), launched in 1964, brought fans together for the purpose of adding to their comic book collections. The Buyer's Guide for Comic Fandom, launched in 1971, served a similar purpose.

In the U.S. a few specialist shops had opened their doors by the 1960s — such as Gary Arlington's San Francisco Comic Book Company in Apri 1968 — but were still a small market. The number of shops grew in the 1970s but remained relatively minimal — this is a list of notable early such retailers in the U.S. and the year they opened:

- 1972 (August) Comics and Comix, Berkeley, California
- 1974 Mile High Comics (Chuck Rozanski), Boulder, Colorado
- 1974 Pacific Comics, Pacific Beach, California
- mid-1970s Comic Kingdom (Richard Alf), San Diego, California
- mid-1970s King's Baseball Cards and Comic Books (Dennis King), Berkeley, California
- 1976 Fat Jack's Comicrypt, Philadelphia, Pennsylvania
- 1979 Golden Apple Comics, Los Angeles, California
- 1980 That's Entertainment, Worcester, Massachusetts

Amsterdam's Lambiek store opened in November 1968.

In the UK, the only distribution channels available were ordinary newsstands and mail order publications like Exchange and Mart or through zines run by the early panelologists themselves. Two early London-based comics speciality shops were Dark They Were and Golden Eyed (opened (c. 1969) and Forbidden Planet (1978).

Two manga specialty shops opened in Tokyo, Japan, in 1979–1980:

- Comic Takaoka, Tokyo, Japan (1979) — originally opened in 1880; shifted focus exclusively to manga in 1979
- Mandarake, Tokyo, Japan (1980)

=== Growth of the direct market ===
Denver, Colorado-based retailer Chuck Rozanski played a large role in the growth of the comics speculation market in 1977 when he acquired the high-value "Mile High Collection" – 16,000 comic books dating from 1937 to 1955 – and slowly began releasing select books into the marketplace.

During the late 1970s–early 1980s major comic publishers like Marvel and DC Comics started to recognize the new movements and started publishing material that was intended for sale in specialist shops only. When Marvel tested the new comics specialty market with the title Dazzler in 1981, the comic sold over 400,000 copies, a very respectable figure and one that astounded the company. Hereafter, comics publishers started tailoring ever-increasing percentages of marketing and production solely for the sale in specialist stores. While the bulk of the revenues still came from sales through regular channels, the ability to focus more specifically on specific target groups as well as distributing comics not on a sale-or-return basis, but in limited runs according to sales predictions from the retailers themselves, over-printing and overhead costs could be drastically reduced. From the 1970s to the present day, comics publishers have been targeting more and more of their titles to collector audiences with features such as limited editions, the use of high quality paper, or the inclusion of novelty items.

=== The speculator boom ===
A foil embossed CGC-graded and authenticated copy of Silver Surfer #50. Signed by Stan Lee

From roughly 1985 through 1993, comic book speculation reached its highest peaks. This boom period began with the publication of titles like Batman: The Dark Knight Returns and Watchmen and "summer crossover epics" like Crisis on Infinite Earths and Secret Wars. After Watchmen and Dark Knight Returns made their mark, mainstream attention returned to the comic book industry in 1989 with the success of the movie Batman and again in 1992 with "The Death of Superman" storyline.

Once aware of this niche market, the mainstream press focused on its potential for making money. Features appeared in newspapers, magazines and television shows detailing how rare, high-demand comics such as Action Comics #1 and Incredible Hulk #181 (the first appearances of Superman and Wolverine, respectively) had sold for thousands of dollars, with Action #1 breaking the $1 million mark.

During this time, mainstream comic book publishers began to pander specifically to the collectors' market. Techniques used included variant covers, polybags, and gimmick covers. When a comic was polybagged, the collector had to choose between either reading the comic book or keeping it in pristine condition for potential financial gain, or buying two or more copies to do both. Gimmicks included glow-in-the-dark, hologram-enhanced, die-cut, embossing, foil stamped or foil-embossed covers. Gimmicks were almost entirely cosmetic in nature, and almost never extended to improved content of the comics. However, many speculators would buy multiple copies of these issues, anticipating that demand would allow them to sell them for a substantial profit in the future.

Low-budget independent publishers also proliferated during this period. The low price of producing comics, and the ease and efficiency of the direct market enabled fly-by-night publishers to flood the market with product, much of it of low quality. A number of these publishers attempted to cash in on current trends – for every Teenage Mutant Ninja Turtles (itself a nod to the popularity of the Uncanny X-Men), there were multitudes of blatant rip-offs like Adolescent Radioactive Black Belt Hamsters, Geriatric Gangrene Jujitsu Gerbils, and Pre-Teen Dirty Gene Kung-Fu Kangaroos.

This period also saw a corresponding expansion in price guide publications, most notably Wizard Magazine, which helped fuel the speculator boom with monthly columns such as the "Wizard Top 10" (highlighting the "hottest" back-issues of the month), "Market Watch" (which not only reported back-issue market trends, but also predicted future price trends), and "Comic Watch" (highlighting key "undervalued" back-issues).

The speculators who made a profit or at least broke even on their comic book "investments" did so only by selling to other speculators. In truth, very few of the comics produced in the early 1990s have retained their value in the current market; with hundreds of thousands (or, in several prominent cases, over ten million) copies produced of certain issues, the value of these comics has all but disappeared. "Hot" comics like X-Men #1 and Youngblood #1 can today be found selling for under a dollar apiece.

Veteran comic book fans pointed out an important fact about the collectors market that was largely overlooked by speculators: popular Golden Age comic books were valuable because they were genuinely rare. Since comic books were originally marketed to children and not viewed as collectible until much later, most Golden Age comics didn't survive to the present era. And before the 1990s, comic books were typically printed on cheap paper stock that aged very poorly. As a result, popular comic books published from the 1940s through the 1960s are extremely difficult to find and thus highly prized by collectors. By contrast, the speculator boom of the 1990s saw large print runs of comics on high-grade paper that were carefully stored by multitudes of collectors, creating a glut of product in the collectors market.

=== Bust of the speculator market ===
The comic book speculator market reached a saturation point in the early 1990s, and finally collapsed between 1993 through 1997. Two-thirds of all comic book specialty stores closed in this period, and numerous publishers were driven out of business. Even industry giant Marvel Comics was forced to declare bankruptcy in 1997, although they were able to continue publishing. It is surmised that one of the main factors in Marvel's downfall was the decision to switch to self-distribution (via their purchase of Heroes World Distribution). Until then, many publishers went through secondary distributors (such as the current and only mass distributor, Diamond Comic Distributors), and Marvel felt it could preserve some of its cash flow if it made the move to becoming one of the few publishers to also distribute directly to the comic market. This backfired terribly when the bottom fell out of the market, as they were stocked with multiple printings of variant and "collectible" issues that were no longer in high demand, and they could not cover the costs of their distribution service.

The bust can also be linked back to some of the series that caused the boom a few years earlier. DC's decision to publish two blockbuster stories depicting the loss of their two major superheroes ("Knightfall" – the breaking of the Batman – and "The Death of Superman"), and their subsequent flooding of the press as to their supposed finality, is considered by some collectors to have started a slow decay within the non-regular buyer comic community which then led to drops in sales. Many comic retailers believe that numerous comic speculators took the death and crippling of two major characters to signify the end of the Batman and Superman series. As many comic readers and retailers knew full well, very little in comics actually changes with any finality. Many aspects of the status quo returned after the story arcs were over (Superman died, but was resurrected, and Batman was crippled, but eventually recovered).

Many comic speculators who were only in the market to see important comics mature, then sell them for a profit, did not quite understand how quick the turnaround would be on the story recant, and many rushed out to scoop up as many copies of whatever issues were to be deemed significant. Comic shops received not only staggering sales during the week that Superman died, but also had to try to meet the demand. This led to the saturation of the market and the devaluing of what was thought to be the end of an American icon. Some comic book retailers and theorists deem DC's practices in the press forum, and their relationship with the non-specialized consumer, to be grossly negligent of the status of the market, and that their marketing campaign, most likely not malicious in intent, spelled doom for the speculator market and comic sales in general. Others place the blame for the comic market crash on Marvel (whose product line had bloated to hundreds of separate titles by late 1993, including the poorly received "Marvel UK" and "2099" lines), or creator-owned upstart Image Comics, who fed the speculator feeding frenzy more than any other comics publisher.

Other publishing houses had different problems. Valiant Comics – at one point the third-largest comic book publisher – was sold to the video game giant Acclaim Entertainment for $65 million in June 1994. Acclaim renamed the line Acclaim Comics in 1996. Their primary motivation was to make the properties more suitable for use in video game development. Eventually, Acclaim filed for bankruptcy following the collapse of its video game business. The miniseries Deathmate – a crossover between Image Comics and Valiant Comics – is often considered to have been the final nail in the speculation market's coffin; although heavily hyped and highly anticipated when initially solicited, the books from the Image Comics side shipped so many months late that reader interest disappeared by the time the series finally materialized, leaving some retailers holding hundreds of unsellable copies of the various Deathmate books. Other companies, such as Broadway Comics, Comico, Continuity Comics, Defiant Comics, Eclipse Comics, First Comics, and Malibu Comics also ceased publication in the period between 1993 and 1997.

=== Post-bubble speculation ===
Since 1997, comic book sales have fallen to a fraction of early-1990s levels, with print runs of many popular titles down as much as 90% from their peaks. Currently, most of the hype generated around the major companies' comics involves changes to the characters, well-known creators writing or illustrating a title, and media coverage surrounding an adaptation to another medium such as film or television.

The remaining bastion of comic speculation consists of online auction sites such as eBay; but even there, comic books remain a buyer's market. In the 2000s, prices for genuinely rare near-mint comics rose steadily, doubling in some cases. This was aided in part by newly established comic book grading companies, such as Comic Guaranty LLC (CGC) and Professional Grading eXperts LLC (PGX). Improved accountability has increased collector confidence, although some collectors have complained that the market has once again become more about speculation than being focused on the art and stories.

Until February 2002, the highest price paid for a comic book was $350,000 for Marvel Comics #1, bought by Jay Parrino (USA) in November 2001. The sale of a CGC-graded 8.0 "very fine" issue of Action Comics #1 reportedly sold between an undisclosed buyer and seller on the comic book online auction site "Comic Connect" for $1,000,000 topped the list for a few days. It was quickly eclipsed by a CGC-graded 8.0 Very Fine Detective #27 (the first Batman comic book) at Heritage Auctions, which realized $1,075,500. In July 2010, another Action Comics #1, a CGC-graded 8.5, was reportedly sold by an undisclosed buyer to an undisclosed seller on "Comics Connect" for $1.5 million, thus setting the current record for the highest sum ever paid for a comic book.

== Conservation of comics ==
To preserve comics, which are a printed medium, it is prescribed that they be stored in cool, dark places, as sunlight can bleach the inks and yellow the paper stock. Some collectors advise against storing comics in cardboard boxes, or using backing boards, as these are both sources of acid which can react with the fibers of the paper of comics, eventually destroying a comic. If these products are used to store comics, these collectors advise using products marked as acid-free.

PET film, polyethylene or polypropylene storage bags are popular, and allow a comic to be "bagged" in a contained environment, and have become the traditional way of storing comics. Some comic shops now sell comics already in bags, although the quality of the bag can vary. These types of bags are not considered "archival safe" because various plastic compositions may contain elements or have other properties that could harm the comic in years to come. Mylars are the only bags available that are archival safe. Corrugated plastic boxes, preferred by some collectors, offer greater protection against acid while also offering better protection against moisture damage and vermin damage.

Original art, typically 11x17 bristol boards with the pencils and ink, can be protected against direct sunlight as well as acid deterioration by using an archival quality frame coupled with glass which has been treated to protect against ultraviolet rays.

In the column Comic Book Vitamins on the Project Fanboy website, Steven Sykora discussed preserving collections by submitting comic books to the CGC, where comics are inspected for flaws, graded accordingly and placed in an inner well – a sealed sleeve of Barex, a highly gas-impermeable plastic polymer. Then, the comics are sealed through a combination of compression and ultrasonic vibration in a transparent, hard plastic capsule. This process is often referred to in slang as "slabbing" and there is debate as to whether this provides better protection for the books than an acid-free backing board and Mylar sleeve.

Storing a comic as a computer file (scanning and saving the comic as a comic book archive) is also an option, allowing those without access to the comic itself a chance to see at the least the story for themselves. However, as with other digital means of storing media, this also allows for the possibility of copyright infringement via unauthorized digital distribution, such as peer-to-peer file sharing networks.

=== Subscription crease ===
A subscription crease describes a specific flaw in the condition of a comic book, particularly a crease through the entire book running from top to bottom. It is a term commonly used by comic book collectors. When comic book publishers began mailing comics directly to monthly subscribers they would simply fold the comic in half and stuff it into a standard #10 business envelope. This method was expedient and cost effective – the comic book business survived on razor-thin margins – but resulted in a clearly visible line running from top to bottom of a comic. The "memory" factor inherent in paper assured that this crease would be visible forever. Consequently, collectors, who prize condition, consider this a defect that lowers the desirability of a particular issue. This practice faded away in the early 1970s when publishers found a marketing opportunity in mailing comics in larger envelopes, unfolded. Hence the appearance of in-issue ads touting that monthly comics were "Mailed flat!"

== Related collecting ==
Collecting original art is the collecting of the artists' production pencils and inks used in the creation of comic books. Unlike mass-produced comic books, there is only one piece of original art for each individual comic book page or cover.

A Mike Zeck original page of the 1984 Marvel Superheroes Secret Wars, showing Spider-Man wearing his black suit for the first time, was sold by Heritage Auctions in January 2022 for over $3 million. As of 2022, it is the most expensive page of a comic book ever sold.

== List of comic collections ==
Many private collections of comics exist, and they have also started to find their way onto the shelves of public libraries. Museums and universities with notable collections of comics include:

- Allen and John Saunders Collection at Bowling Green State University's Popular Culture Library.
- British Comics Collection at The British Library.
- Comic art collection of Michigan State University.
- Comic Book Research Guide of The New York Public Library.
- The Comics Collection, including the Sol Davidson Collection at the University of Florida.
- Cartoon Research Library of Ohio State University
- CartoonHub, the website of the British Cartoon Archive, University of Kent
- James Cabell Library at Virginia Commonwealth University (VCU) in Richmond, Virginia
- The United States Library of Congress holds many collections of comic strips, comic books and periodicals.

== Comic collectors ==
Comic collectors are people who collect comics or comic books. Many comic readers keep their comics for an indefinite period and have large accumulations, but a true collector differs in enthusiasm and degree; collectors will generally at least seek past issues rather than being content to read what new comics come along.

As comic book characters become more mainstream through adaptations in other media (primarily television and film), a number of notable people have professed to be comic book collectors, such as:

- Actor Nicolas Cage, who changed his original last name of Coppola (part of an extended family working in film, including his uncle Francis Ford Coppola) to the stage name "Cage", based on the Marvel Comics character Luke Cage, to avoid the appearance of nepotism when he entered the film industry. A longtime comics fan, Cage amassed an impressive collection over the years, but in October 2002, he auctioned off most of his collection for combined proceeds of over $1.68 million through Heritage Auctions. Heritage sold Nicolas Cage's remaining comics privately over the next year for approximately another $325,000, and in 2009 they also auctioned part of Cage's movie poster collection. Cage also starred in the 2007 film Ghost Rider and its 2012 sequel Ghost Rider: Spirit of Vengeance.
- Actor Ben Affleck, who has named Daredevil as his favorite comic from his childhood. Affleck played that series' title character in the 2003 film of the same name, and played Batman in Batman v Superman: Dawn of Justice and Justice League.
- Writer, director and actor Kevin Smith, whose love for comics has been reflected in much of his film work in the so-called "View Askewniverse", particularly the film Mallrats. Smith has also written stories for comics published by Marvel and DC; as a nod to his work on the Daredevil comic, he had a cameo in the film adaptation as a morgue worker.
- Actor Samuel L. Jackson is a reader and collector well into middle age, stating as recently as a July 2006 interview that he was reading currently-published comic books. Jackson gave Marvel Comics permission to use his likeness for the re-imagined "Ultimate" version of Nick Fury, and later played a similar version of Fury in several of the film and television projects comprising the Marvel Cinematic Universe.
- British TV and radio presenter Jonathan Ross is a long time collector of comic books. He donated his copy of Amazing Fantasy #15 to charity, and presented a TV documentary on Steve Ditko called In Search of Steve Ditko.
- Jimmy Jacobs, the handball player who later managed Mike Tyson, owned one of the world's largest comic book collections, including six copies of a rare 1938 issue of Detective Comics.

== Comic collecting websites ==
With comics being a popular topic on the Internet, many websites dedicated to helping users manage their comic collections have been created. These websites also contain a platform for communication to assist with discussions between collectors. Some websites allow purchasing and reading comic books online.

== See also ==
- Comicphilia

== Sources ==
- Sabin, Roger (1993) Adult Comics: An Introduction ISBN 0-415-04418-9
