= Free Comic Book Day =

Promotional event for the comics industry

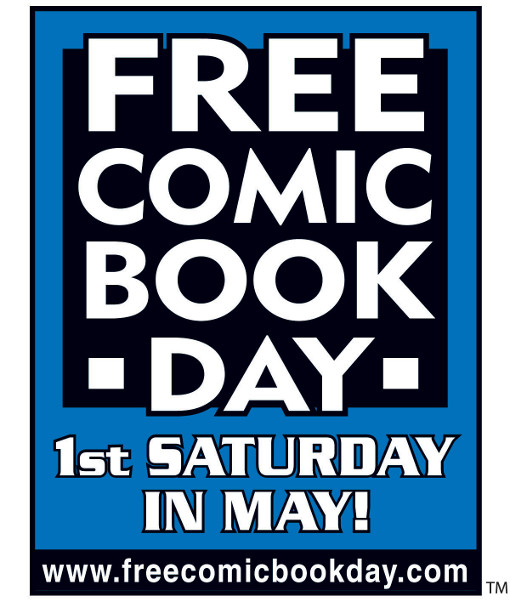
- Genre: Promotion, cultural
- Frequency: Annually, first Saturday of May
- Location: Over 2,000 comic book shops worldwide
- Inaugurated: May 4, 2002
- Founder: Joe Field
- Most recent: May 2, 2026
- Next event: May 1, 2027
- Major events: Merchandise giveaways; Book signings; Cosplay contests; Art exhibitions
- Organizer: Diamond Comics Distributors
- Website: www.freecomicbookday.com

Free Comic Book Day (FCBD) is an annual promotional effort by the North American comic book industry to attract new readers to independent comic book stores. It usually takes place on the first Saturday of May and has historically been cross-promoted with the release of a superhero film. Over two thousand participating stores give away millions of comic books annually. The event was proposed by Joe Field in the August 2001 issue of Comics & Games Retailer magazine and Free Comic Book Day was launched in 2002, owned and coordinated by the industry's single large distributor, Diamond Comic Distributors. FCBD has become an official Children's Book Week event and has inspired similar events for German- and Dutch-language comics industries. Following Diamond's bankruptcy and liquidation in 2025, rights to FCBD were acquired by Universal Distribution, with competitor Penguin Random House holding a parallel event called Comics Giveaway Day.

== Organization ==
FCBD is organized and facilitated by Diamond Comics Distributors, guided by a committee representing publishers, industry journalists, retailers, and its own management. This committee selects the titles from publishers with the aim of providing a wide variety of what the industry has to offer. The committee also investigates potential dates for the event which are then decided upon by a vote among retailers.

Publishers subsidize the production of the give-away comic books and retailers pay a reduced price for the books that they order. Titles are divided by sponsorship level, price, age rating, and anticipated demand into two tiers; participating retailers are required to carry all titles from the top tier, and may carry any or none of the second-tier titles. In 2007, the costs to the retailer were 12 to 24 cents per copy for the top tier and as high as 50 cents for the second tier. The minimum buy-in is about US$50.

== History ==
Free Comic Book Day was conceived by Joe Field, a California-based comics retailer, event promoter and partner in WonderCon. In 2001, Field noted how successful feature films based on comic book franchises were providing the comic book industry with a positive cultural and financial turnaround from the speculator bust of the mid-1990s. Inspired by Free Scoop Night at the Baskin-Robbins ice cream parlor next to his store, Field proposed Free Comic Book Day in his August 2001 "Big Picture" column in Comics & Games Retailer magazine. The column received positive reaction and Image Comics co-founder Jim Valentino suggested having the first FCBD coincide with the opening weekend of the 2002 Spider-Man feature film, in order to take advantage of the film's heavy promotion and related press about the comic book medium. The first event was held May 4, 2002, the day after the film's opening, and its first four free comic books were Marvel Comics' Ultimate Spider-Man #1 (a reprint of its issue published in 2000), Dark Horse Comics' one-shot Star Wars Tales: A Jedi's Weapon, Image Comics/Top Cow Productions' one-shot Tomb Raider #1 1/2 and the first issue of DC Comics' Justice League Adventures comic book (based on the Justice League animated television series). The event has usually been held on the first Saturday in May, and is often cross-promoted with the release of the first big-budget superhero film of the summer.

According to Diamond Comic Distributors, over 2,000 stores participated in the inaugural Free Comic Book Day and gave away more than 2 million comic books from 4 publishers. The following year, 29 publishers participated. FCBD 2012 exceeded one million attendees, with over 3.5 million comics given away. In 2015, 2,340 retailers ordered 5.6 million comic books to give away.

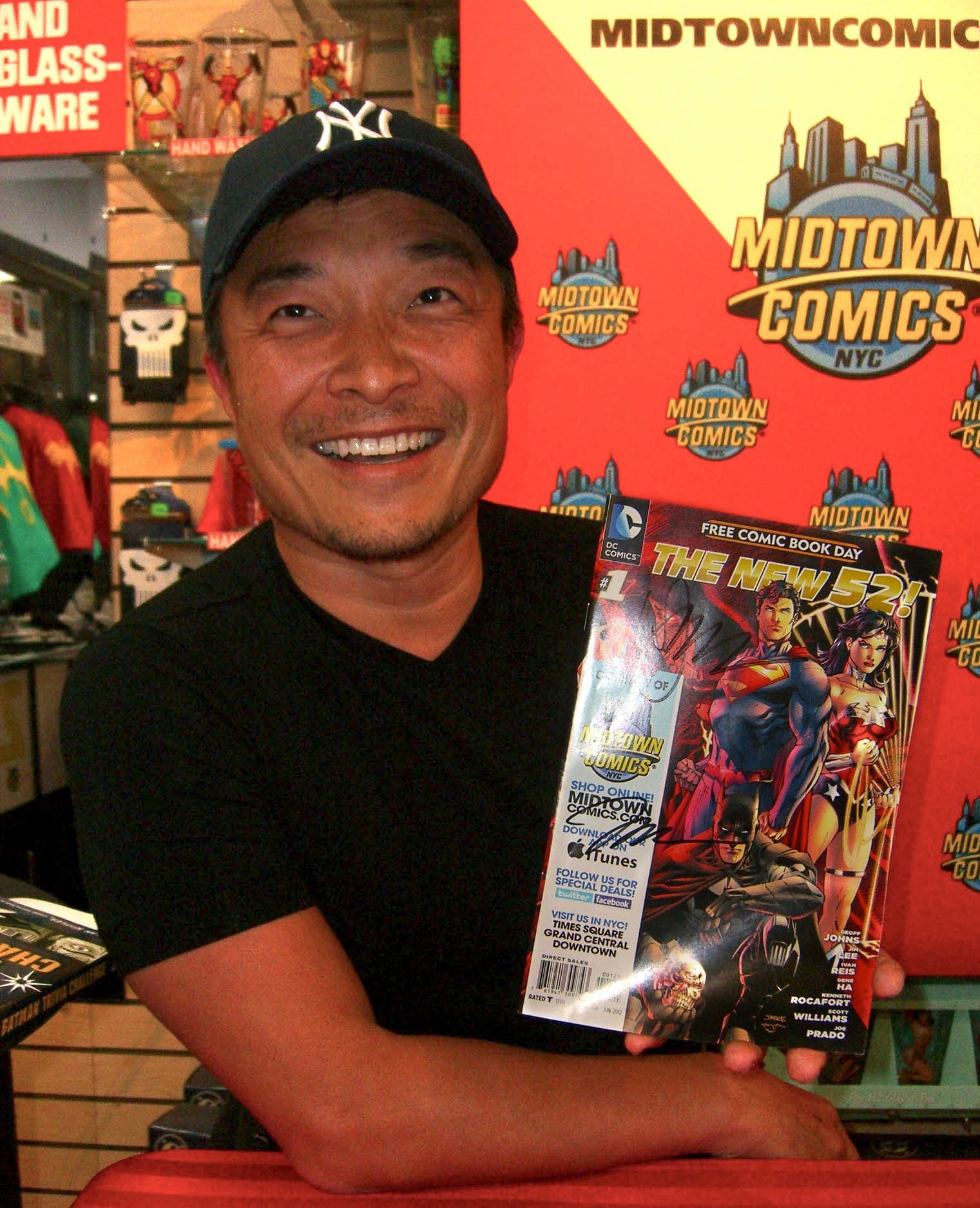
Artist Jim Lee holds a signed FCBD edition of The New 52 at Midtown Comics in Manhattan.

While giving out free comic books on FCBD, participating retailers often run additional promotions. This can include sales on selected merchandise, creator signings, prize raffles, cosplay contests, charity drives, karaoke, and art exhibitions. The event quickly grew to become a major celebration of comic book culture and fan clubs may volunteer to support local stores and help manage the crowds of people attracted to the event. Cosplayers may be enlisted to entertain the lines outside the stores and pose for photos.

Among some retailers, FCBD has been more grandly organized. An FCBD "shop hop" cross-promotion in London, Ontario, Canada, encourages people to visit five downtown comic shops for entry into a prize draw, and has evolved into a street festival. Cosplayers parade along the street, which is chalked with murals, and many other businesses along the route cater to the theme. Mesa, Arizona, and Portsmouth, England, have each expanded FCBD into a two-day comics convention.

The COVID-19 pandemic caused the cancellation of FCBD 2020. Alt Free Comic Days was held online on that weekend, streaming panel discussions with comics creators and artists. In mid-June, Diamond Comics announced that the planned titles would be released weekly as Free Comic Book Summer from July 15 to September 9. In 2021, FCBD was held on August 14, when COVID-19 restrictions had eased somewhat. That year's event was received as a big day for fans in the absence of comic book conventions and other major gatherings. However, delays in shipping led to the event being postponed for overseas retailers. From the twentieth anniversary edition of the event, held May 7, 2022, FCBD returned to the first Saturday in May.

By 2024 Diamond had lost its distinction as the sole major distributor of North American comics. In 2025, the company filed for bankruptcy, which "fundamentally changed the comics landscape" according to Publishers Weekly. Diamond's assets were sold, with Universal Distribution acquiring the rights to Free Comic Book Day. Some of the new distributors negotiated with Universal to include their publishers in FCBD, (Note: Lunar Distribution was creating Comic Free-For-All as its own event before reaching an agreement to join Universal's FCBD.) while Penguin Random House organized a parallel event dubbed Comics Giveaway Day. (Bad Idea Comics sent free comics to stores without associating with either event.) Both events were held at the same stores on May 2, 2026, with more than 20 titles each.

== Events ==
No.	Date	Associated film
1	May 4, 2002	Spider-Man
2	May 3, 2003	X2
3	Jul 3, 2004	Spider-Man 2
4	May 7, 2005	none
5	May 6, 2006	none
6	May 5, 2007	Spider-Man 3
7	May 3, 2008	Iron Man
8	May 2, 2009	X-Men Origins: Wolverine
9	May 1, 2010	Iron Man 2
10	May 7, 2011	Thor
11	May 5, 2012	The Avengers
12	May 4, 2013	Iron Man 3
13	May 3, 2014	The Amazing Spider-Man 2
14	May 2, 2015	Avengers: Age of Ultron
15	May 7, 2016	Captain America: Civil War
16	May 6, 2017	Guardians of the Galaxy Vol. 2
17	May 5, 2018	Venom (Note: FCBD 2018 would have followed the release of Avengers: Infinity War which originally had a scheduled release date of May 4, but was moved up to April 27. The official website indicates the film Venom was celebrated, marking the 30th anniversary of the character, although the film was not released until five months later.)
18	May 4, 2019	none (Note: FCBD 2019 would have followed the release of Avengers: Endgame which originally had a scheduled release date of May 3 but was moved up to April 26.)
FCB Summer	Jul 15 – Sep 9, 2020 (Note: FCBD 2020 had been scheduled for May 2 but was cancelled due to the COVID-19 pandemic and replaced with a summer-long promotion.)	none (Note: No films were released at this time due to the pandemic. The original May 2 FCBD date would have followed the scheduled release of Black Widow, which was postponed first to November 6, 2020, then to May 7, 2021.)
19	Aug 14, 2021	none (Note: Free Guy was released on August 13, 2021, following multiple COVID-19 reschedules from its original planned release of July 3, 2020. However, sources do not connect the release to FCBD.)
20	May 7, 2022	Doctor Strange in the Multiverse of Madness
21	May 6, 2023	Guardians of the Galaxy Vol. 3
22	May 4, 2024	none (Note: May 4 was among the scheduled release dates for Deadpool & Wolverine, which was delayed due to the 2023 SAG-AFTRA strike and production issues.)
23	May 3, 2025	Thunderbolts*
24	May 2, 2026	none
25	May 1, 2027 (Note: Scheduled)	

== Products ==
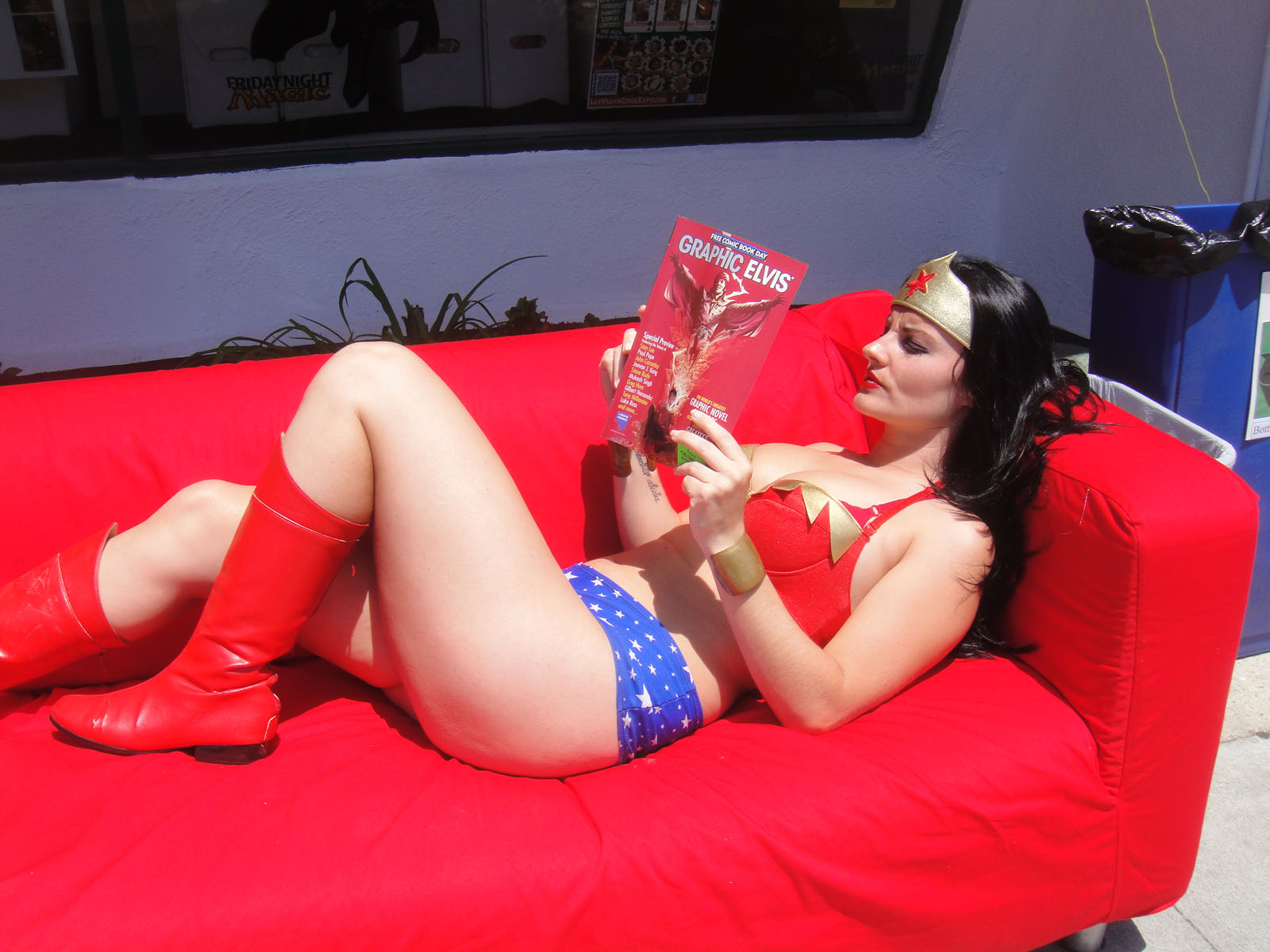
A Wonder Woman cosplayer reads a FCBD edition of Graphic Elvis by independent publisher Liquid Comics.

The goal of the promotion is to showcase the breadth of the comics industry by putting comic books in the hands of people who might not otherwise read comics, or comic readers who might not otherwise read those titles. At least 50 titles were available on FCBD each year from 2014 to 2018. Most of the FCBD comic books are produced specifically for the promotion, and can become collector items. On some occasions, retailers have partnered with publishers to make custom covers exclusive to their stores.

Most books are complete 32-page single-issue stories serving as an introduction point for newcomers. These may be in the form of a "zero issue" (Note: A zero issue is used by comics publishers to indicate a comic book outside of the regular storyline of that title. It is typically a prequel, flashback or origin story, providing supplementary background context to the main run of the title. Many zero issues are limited-edition collector's items.) prelude to a new story arc. There have also been flip-books with two separate stories, or samplers with a number of short pieces. Non-fiction titles have included collectors' guides, art books, biographies of prominent creators, and histories of the comics industry. For 2020, age ratings were added to identify all-ages, teen, and mature content. Stores may also be provided with posters or other merchandise to give away in cross-promotions with associated films.

== Reception ==
The first Free Comic Book Day (and organizer Joe Field) was given a Lulu of the Year award in 2003 by Friends of Lulu, an organization dedicated to increasing the participation of girls and women in the comics industry.

According to organizers, in the 2010s each year's event brought about one million people to comic shops and gave away about five million comics. Marc Nix of IGN called FCBD a "wonderful comic nerd holiday" and F. Andrew Taylor of the Las Vegas Review-Journal said it was like "a combination of Christmas, Halloween and Burning Man" to fans. Scott Thill of Wired wrote that "Free culture has rarely paid off so handsomely, for fans or publishers." Diamond Comics reported that media coverage of the 2014 event was equivalent to $3.2 million in publicity.

There have been criticisms of the focus on the event, questioning whether centering promotions at comic book shops is the best way to reach new comic book readers. Other criticisms center around the selection of titles and their cost to retailers. Many retailers only order the titles they know are marketable at their stores, and are reluctant to invest in promoting titles they cannot sell for the rest of the year. This results in the promotion of the same titles that customers are already reading instead of exposing them to new titles. The number of titles has also caused concern for some retail staff and journalists, who find it challenging to gain familiarity with all 50 to 60 titles to make recommendations. Columnist and retailer Scott Thorne felt that the split event of 2026 created unnecessary work for retailers, with competing promotions and branding, and inconsistent colour codes for age ratings.

== Related events ==
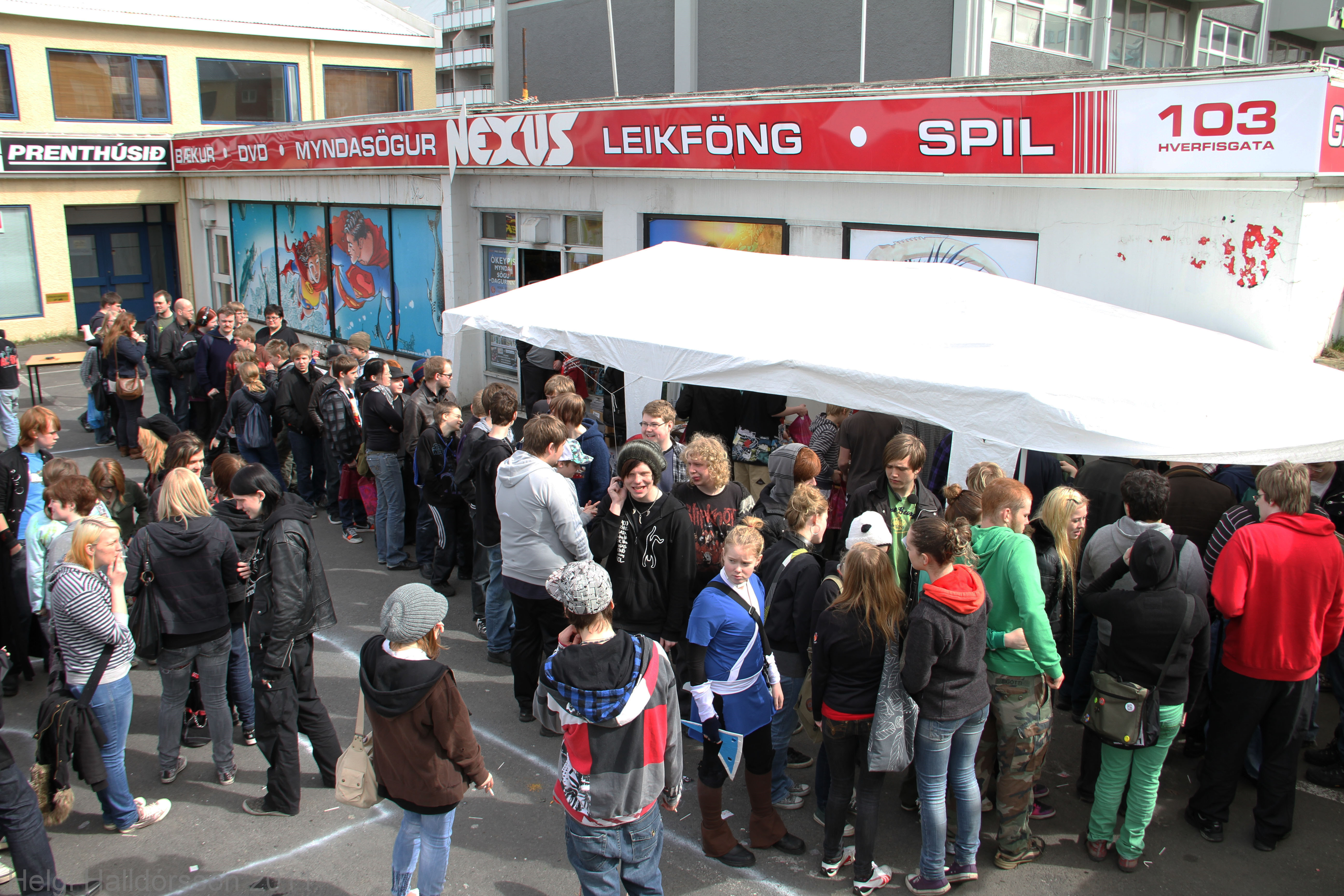
2011 FCBD at Nexus Comics in Iceland

Gratis Comic Tag was launched in 2010 and is held in comics shops in Germany, Austria, and Switzerland on the Saturday following FCBD. Nearly 20 publishers participate, with about 35 titles offered for free.

The Netherlands and Flanders (the Dutch-speaking part of Belgium) have also observed Free Comic Book Day, beginning on May 5, 2012.

Halloween ComicFest is an annual promotion launched by Diamond Comics in 2012, held roughly six months from FCBD on the Saturday before Halloween, promoting titles themed to that holiday. Each year there are about 20 full-sized free titles and another 10 mini-comics which can be purchased in packs for trick-or-treaters. In 2016, about 2 million comics were given away by 1,900 shops. Costume contests are held by some retailers, and online via the event's website.

Local Comic Shop Day (LCSD) is an annual promotion begun in 2015 by North American trade association ComicsPRO, and held annually in late November. Approximately 20 LCSD special edition comic books are offered each year, with retailers often having Black Friday discounts on merchandise. This event has been compared to FCBD and Record Store Day.

Children's Book Week (CBW), organized by American non-profit Every Child a Reader, was moved to May in 2008. FCBD was named as an official CBW event, launching Children's Book Week, and the two organizations partner in promoting child literacy. In 2015, FCBD carried the literacy guide Raising A Reader! How Comics & Graphic Novels Can Help Your Kids Love to Read! among its free titles.

Inspired by Free Comic Book Day, the pen-and-paper roleplaying game industry started Free RPG Day on June 15, 2007. It is a moveable event held on the third Saturday in June.

== See also ==
- Star Wars Day, which occasionally coincides with FCBD
