= Grand Comics Database =

Internet-based database of comic book information

- Website type: Comic book
- Available in: English (and incomplete versions in Dutch, German, Italian and Swedish)
- Website: www.comics.org
- Current status: Online

The Grand Comics Database (GCD) is an Internet-based project to build a database of comic book information through user contributions. The GCD project catalogues information on creator credits, story details, reprints, and other information useful to the comic book reader, comic collector, fan, and scholar. The GCD is a 501(c)(3) nonprofit organization incorporated in Arkansas.

== History ==
One of the earliest published catalogues of comic books appeared in the 1960s, when Jerry Bails and Howard Keltner put together some projects to catalogue the comic books of the "Golden Age". These efforts were Bails' The Collector's Guide to the First Heroic Age of Comics, and Howard Keltner's Index to Golden Age Comic Books, and their collaboration on The Authoritative Index to DC Comics. The next big step in organizing data about comic books was Robert Overstreet's Overstreet Comic Book Price Guide, which is still being published. This guide is sometimes referred to as the first best attempt to list factual information beyond the superhero comics. It was likely the first catalogue to get widespread distribution. Today there are several other comic book price guides.

In 1978, the GCD's immediate predecessor, APA-I (Amateur Press Alliance for Indexing) was formed by a few fans who were interested in exchanging information on comic books in index form. These people were generally interested in one of two things — either following the plot threads and continuity of the stories, or the creator credits. APA-I is also still running, as a paper-based index. The organization publishes a quarterly magazine. APA-I members have gathered editorial records and conducted interviews with comic book professionals, to add to the information that could be gleaned from the books themselves.

In late 1993 and early 1994, three members of APA-I interested in comic books started up an e-mail correspondence. Tim Stroup, Bob Klein, and Jonathan E. Ingersoll soon began sharing indexing information in a common format using electronic media for storage and distribution. By March 1994, they had formed a new group to create an electronic version of APA-I related to comic books, giving it the name Grand Comic-Book Database and the goal to 'contain information on every comic book ever published'.

The newly formed GCD grew slowly, using the new medium of e-mail to canvass friends and acquaintances from APA-I as well as other contacts in comics fandom. Early work consisted of indexing information, setting goals, and deciding on file structure. Information was distributed on floppy discs and via surface mail. The use of e-mail to knit together the group through constant communication has proved important to this day. There had been several previous attempts to set up similar groups that did not have this advantage. The original file structure has changed, and data distribution and collection methods are now almost exclusively over the Internet. It is one of several online databases of comic book information.

In December 2009, a vote was held of the membership and it was decided to change the official name from "The Grand Comic-Book Database" to "The Grand Comics Database".

== Organization ==
The Grand Comics Database is a volunteer organization of hobbyists. It is not a commercial endeavor, and its charter states that it will not become one. The database currently catalogues more types of information than originally intended, and the formats of presentation and data gathering have changed also. All data is available for research and use by the public at no charge.

The project is overseen by a board elected by the members. Decisions on changes are to be made by the board as directed by member consensus. The project operates with several public contacts.

- The Public Relations Coordinators post updates to Facebook, Twitter, and other outlets, and monitor the contact email account.
- The Technical Coordinator oversees the technical work on the site and coordinates it with the non-technical aspects of the project.
- The Rules Coordinators manage the process by which data entry and formatting rules are established.

The bulk of the work is performed by an ever-changing group of editors and contributors through the online indexing system on the website, or through offline submissions. Casual users of the website also make contributions through an error reporting system. As several comic book creators are members, these creators often provide details on their own work or colleagues' work.

Several e-mail lists are maintained for communication of a variety of comic book-related information. The database does not include any information on comic book pricing, nor does it conduct any sales or trade services.

== Specifications ==
The Grand Comics Database intends to catalogue key story information, creator information, and other information which is useful to readers, fans, hobbyists, and researchers. This includes creator information such as writers, pencillers, inkers, colorists, letterers, and editors. It also includes story information such as title, feature of the story, genre of the story, page count, characters, and a short synopsis. Stories are defined to include any feature in a comic book, which allows the database to include advertising, text articles in an issue, letter columns, character profiles, and any other features that are in a comic book. Also included is information on the comic books themselves, such as: publisher, publication date, price, page count, a cover image, and reprint information.

The GCD project uses a broad definition of comic book; a comic book is 50% or more art and/or pictures which tell a story. The editors try to err on the side of inclusion, so that if there is a question, a book usually can be included. This definition eliminates any webcomics, but it includes small print run fanzines, promotional giveaway comics, and minicomics. Although syndicated comic strips are not indexed, listings include mentions of comic books reprinting newspaper strips.

Since 2004, comic book fans can index their favorite comic book using the convenience of a web-based interface. Anyone interested is encouraged to contribute, by using the interface, uploading a cover image scan, or even simply sending an e-mail with new information. The standards request that all indexing be done from an actual copy of the comic book, to ensure that data is verified upon entry. A group of editors then vets each entry before the information is added to the database.

The database currently has comic books from many countries representing over a hundred languages, though United States issues in the English language represent the bulk of the data. There are active chapters and indexers in several other countries, including Germany, the Netherlands, Norway, and Sweden.

As of March 2025, the database includes information on over:

- 16,800 publishers
- 80,000 creators
- 212,300 series
- 2,110,000 issues (including 214,200 variants and over 4,100,000 stories)
- 1,273,000 cover images

== See also ==
- List of comics creators
- List of comic books
- List of comics publishing companies
