= Ting Yi-ming beef noodle controversy =

2020 Taiwanese political controversy

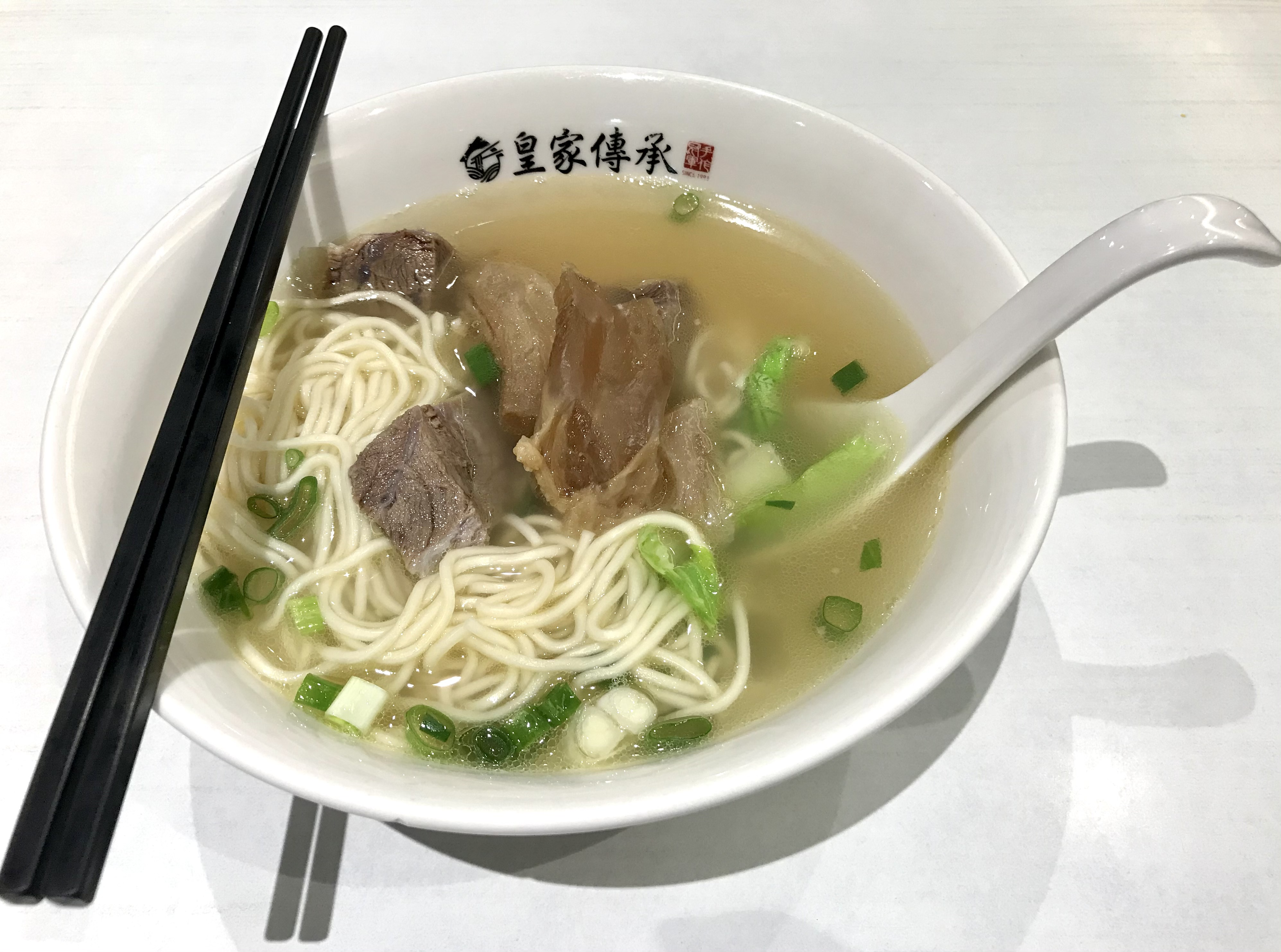
Bowl of beef noodles made by the Royal Heritage Beef Noodles restaurant, pictured in 2020

The Ting Yi-ming beef noodle controversy was a political incident that broke out in the politics of Taiwan in November 2020. The controversy stemmed from the debate surrounding the importation of ractopamine-containing U.S. beef and pork into Taiwan. In response to Taipei Mayor Ko Wen-je, Executive Yuan spokesperson Ting Yi-ming claimed that the Royal Heritage Beef Noodles restaurant used U.S. beef containing ractopamine. This accusation triggered backlash when the restaurant issued a statement along with a test report showing zero detection of ractopamine, leading to a series of ensuing events. As a result, Ting Yi-ming resigned from his position.

The following year, it was confirmed that the cattle used by the restaurant had indeed been fed ractopamine during their raising period. However, in compliance with Taiwanese regulations, the substance had been withdrawn before slaughter. Despite this, the restaurant faced renewed online attacks, leading to heated exchanges between both sides. Critics argued that the restaurant had used meat from cattle that had been fed ractopamine during the raising process, while the restaurant maintained that the meat they used did not contain ractopamine at the time of consumption, contrary to Ting Yi-ming's statement.

== Overview of the incident ==
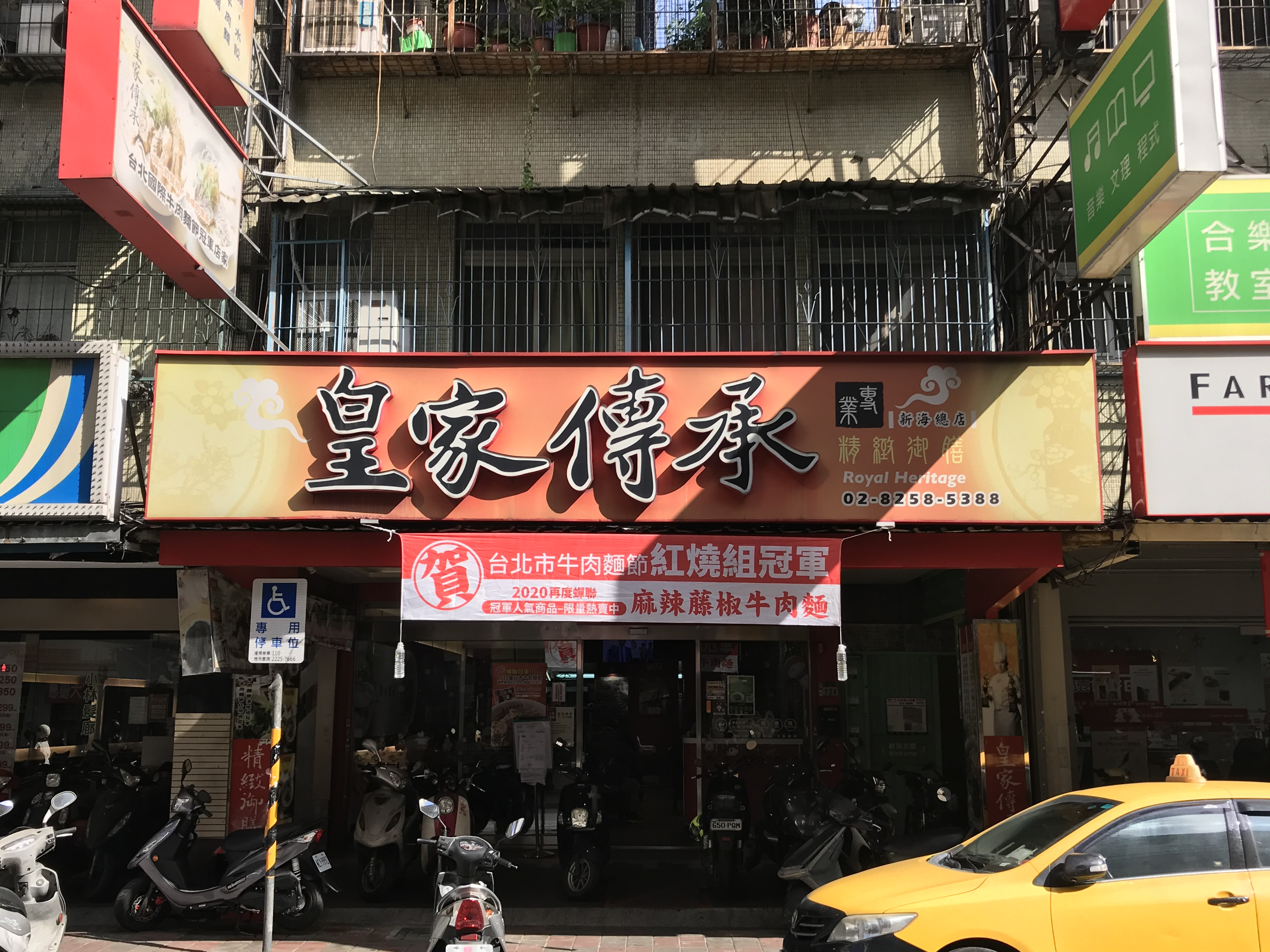
Royal Heritage Beef Noodles in Banqiao District, New Taipei, the restaurant and franchise involved in the controversy

=== Origin ===
On the morning of November 12, 2020, Taipei Mayor Ko Wen-je attended a meeting of the Executive Yuan, where he recommended that United States beef imports in Taiwan (commonly referred to as "ractopamine pork") should be clearly labeled. During a post-meeting interview, Ko stated that he proposed two principles — source control and clear labeling — along with four concrete suggestions in response to the controversy surrounding ractopamine pork imports.

Later, Executive Yuan spokesperson Ting Yi-ming held a press conference and stated that Ko's proposals involved scientific standards and health expertise. Premier Su Tseng-chang had asked the Ministry of Health and Welfare and the Council of Agriculture to respond accordingly. Ting then mentioned that the champion of the 2020 Taipei International Beef Noodle Festival—the Royal Heritage Beef Noodles restaurant in Banqiao District, New Taipei City, which was awarded by Taipei Deputy Mayor Huang Shan-shan—used U.S. beef containing ractopamine. He stated that as long as the beef met United Nations standards, there would be no food safety issue, and also claimed that full labeling would be difficult and unreasonable.

=== Restaurant's response ===
On the same day, the restaurant's business was severely affected, with orders dropping by two-thirds and the usual long lines disappearing. Some members of the public made harassing phone calls or left negative reviews on Google Maps.

That afternoon, the chairman of the Taipei Beef Noodle Exchange Development Association, Cheng Cheng-chung, Royal Heritage Beef Noodles general manager Chen Chia-bin, and Liao Kuo-bin, owner of Niu Jiangjun restaurant, held a press conference in the Taipei City Council, protesting to the Executive Yuan and demanding an apology. They also released an SGS test report on Facebook and at the press conference, proving that ractopamine was not detected.

=== Invoice controversy ===
Following the restaurant's statement, Ting Yi-ming apologized and, around 5 p.m., visited the restaurant along with Democratic Progressive Party (DPP) legislator Lo Chih-cheng, ordering 100 bowls of beef noodles to express his apology and allow Executive Yuan staff to enjoy the food. Ting later posted a screenshot of the order receipt on Facebook, apologizing again and emphasizing that beef from any country is safe as long as it meets national standards.

However, netizens noticed that the receipt included the Executive Yuan's taxpayer ID number (03722403), raising suspicions that the order was intended to be reimbursed with public funds. That evening, Ting explained that he had paid with his own credit card, and the secretary had included the taxpayer ID out of habit. He clarified that he had placed a new order to replace the original to avoid misunderstandings.

=== Premier Su's apology ===
On the morning of November 13, Premier Su Tseng-chang apologized before addressing the Legislative Yuan, stating that Ting Yi-ming's original intention was misunderstood and inadvertently implicated the restaurant. He said Ting was a young man who had made a mistake and added, "To err is human; to correct it is virtuous."

That evening, Su, Ting, Lo Chih-cheng, and DPP legislator Chang Hung-lu visited the restaurant again. Upon finishing their meal, founder Chen Shih-cheng offered to treat them, but Su insisted on paying and apologized again.

=== Ting Yi-ming's resignation ===
On the night of November 15, Ting announced his resignation, citing that the controversy had been politically manipulated by opposition parties and that he, as spokesperson, could no longer effectively support the team. To avoid further complications in the administration's governance, he submitted his resignation to Premier Su. Executive Yuan Secretary-General Li Meng-yen took over as acting spokesperson.

However, Ting continued working behind the scenes at the Executive Yuan, advising on media and online communications. In March 2021, he was reappointed as a consultant to the Executive Yuan, with a monthly salary of approximately NT$120,000. KMT legislator Lee Kuei-min criticized the appointment, arguing that consultant roles should be filled by civil servants and accused the administration of undermining the civil service system. In response, Executive Yuan spokesperson Lo Ping-cheng stated that Ting was hired under the regulations set by the Examination Yuan, consistent with previous administrations' practices.

=== Text message dispute ===
On the morning of November 16, Ting posted a screenshot on Facebook, claiming that he had received a supportive text message from Chen Chia-bin. However, Chen denied sending it and said he had never communicated with Ting, emphasizing that he was the only official spokesperson for the restaurant. Ting later clarified that the message was sent by founder Chen Shih-cheng and said he would visit the restaurant to apologize in person.

=== Prosecutors drop charges ===
Taipei City Councilors Wang Hung-wei, Hou Han-ting, and Taichung City Councilor Lo Ting-wei filed a complaint against Ting Yi-ming with the Taipei District Prosecutors Office, accusing him of violating the Act Governing Food Safety and Sanitation.

Prosecutors summoned three beef suppliers for the restaurant and learned that while the cattle had indeed been fed ractopamine-containing feed during their raising period, usage had ceased before slaughter in accordance with Taiwanese regulations. All imported beef passed inspections and tested negative for ractopamine residue. The prosecutors also reviewed footage from the Executive Yuan's press conference and found that Ting had used the restaurant only as an example, stating that the Executive Yuan's regulatory focus was on residue levels, not whether the animals had been fed ractopamine during raising.

At that time, a reporter asked Ko Wen-je about his intention to require pork imported from the United States to be labeled to indicate whether it was raised with ractopamine feed. Ting Yi-ming reiterated that the Executive Yuan defines the standard for residual value and does not target what the animals eat during the breeding process, and therefore cited the example of store beef cattle.

On August 13, 2021, the Taipei District Prosecutors Office ruled not to indict Ting Yi-ming stating that his comments were not inappropriate. On the same day, Ko Wen-je commented that Ting did not intend to harm the restaurant and was instead targeting Ko himself, calling Ting "a talented person." Restaurant representative Chen Chia-bin said he had no comment on the prosecutors' decision.

== Reactions ==
During a DPP Central Standing Committee meeting on November 19, President Tsai Ing-wen (also chairperson of the Democratic Progressive Party) remarked that the coming months would be filled with challenges. Although the party received 8.17 million votes in the last election, she emphasized that in a democratic society, no support is guaranteed forever. The DPP, she said, must handle issues more carefully and maintain communication with supporters to preserve their trust and understanding.

On November 13 and 14, Premier Su Tseng-chang issued multiple public apologies, stating that the government would reflect with humility and have the courage to correct its mistakes.

KMT Chairman and legislator Johnny Chiang claimed that Ting Yi-ming's actions reflected the collective will of the Executive Yuan, and the beef noodle incident should not be blamed on Ting alone. He also criticized the Executive Yuan for its loss of credibility, which he said undermined trust between central and local governments. Chiang warned that even if Ting resigned, "there will still be countless others like him" within the Executive Yuan. He further argued that the incident eroded public trust in how the Tsai administration spends its budget, especially on advertising and promotion.

New Power Party legislator Chiu Hsien-chih noted that the Executive Yuan spokesperson receives a monthly special allowance of NT$21,700 and questioned whether it was permissible to claim expenses using a government tax ID. He called on the National Audit Office to investigate. Chiu also criticized Ting for taking all the blame, thereby shielding higher-ups in the Executive Yuan from accountability.

During a city council session on November 13, Taipei Mayor Ko Wen-je said that Taipei's spokespersons are more honest and would not act like Ting Yi-ming. Asked to grade Ting's performance, Ko quipped, "Ting Ting is a real talent—if the full score is 100, I'd give him 120 points, because he self-destructed." That same day, while dining at a beef noodle restaurant called Niu Jiangjun, Ko commented that the DPP was overly politicizing everything, and that each incident was turned into a political weapon. He urged the DPP to focus on problem-solving instead of smearing opponents daily.

On November 14, the former director of the Kaohsiung City Government's Information Bureau, Wang Chien-chiu, posted on Facebook criticizing Ting for using a small business as a political scapegoat, making baseless accusations, spreading false information, and paying with taxpayers' money while pretending it was out-of-pocket—thus, disgracing the integrity of public officials.

On December 15, the KMT legislative caucus held a press conference mocking the DPP's new "Top 10 Fake News of 2020" voting campaign launched via the party's official Line account, pointing out that all the "domestic fake news" entries targeted the Tsai administration. They sarcastically proposed that the list should include: "Ting Yi-ming falsely accusing Royal Heritage Beef Noodles of using ractopamine beef" and "Su Tseng-chang naming Hsin Gong Meat Products as supporting ractopamine pork imports," which they claimed would easily take the top spots.

During a Facebook livestream on December 15, blogger and commentator Lucifer Chu ranked "Ting Yi-ming falsely accusing Royal Heritage Beef Noodles of using ractopamine beef" as No. 1 in his own "Top 10 Fake News of 2020." He mocked the DPP for manufacturing false narratives and warned that their expertise does not justify arbitrarily labeling others as liars.

The KMT's official Facebook fan page published a post condemning the Tsai administration, accusing DPP politicians of consistently spreading disinformation to deceive the public without facing consequences. The post read: "Ordinary citizens are constantly harassed by the government, but DPP officials never face repercussions—green truly is the color of forgiveness."

While reporting Premier Su Tseng-chang to the police for allegedly spreading false information related to the "Save the Algal Reefs" referendum, KMT New Taipei City spokesperson Hsiao Ching-yen criticized the DPP for monopolizing the definition of "fake news." He claimed: "If the message doesn't align with the DPP's agenda, criticizes them, or exposes them, it's immediately labeled as fake news."

== Related events ==
On December 13, 2020, Premier Su Tseng-chang visited the Taiwan ComicBase and used the government-issued triple stimulus vouchers to purchase original Taiwanese comic books as gifts for his granddaughter. However, netizens noticed that the receipt showed the Executive Yuan's tax ID number "03722403," leading to public scrutiny. In response, Secretary-General Li Meng-yen clarified that personal spending by the premier cannot be reimbursed with public funds. To prevent misunderstanding, staff from the Protocol Section were instructed to retrieve the invoice from Su and replace it at the Taiwan Comic Base the following day.
