= Betsy Curtis =

American writer

- Born: Elizabeth King McGee; September 17, 1917; Toledo, Ohio, U.S.
- Died: April 17, 2002 (aged 84); Meadville, Pennsylvania, U.S.
- Education: Oberlin College; Allegheny College
- Occupation: Writer
- Children: 4, including Maggie Thompson
- Relatives: Harold McGee (nephew); Stephen Thompson (grandson); Otis Freeman Curtis (father-in-law)
- Writing career
- Years active: 1950-1973
- Genres: Science fiction Fantasy

Elizabeth King McGee Curtis (September 17, 1917 – April 17, 2002) was an American science fiction and fantasy writer. She published at least sixteen stories, and was nominated for the Hugo Award in 1969.

== Early life and education ==
Curtis was born in Toledo, Ohio, the daughter of Harold Gilbert McGee and Margaret Coffin Bradshaw McGee. Her father was an engineer and statistician. She earned a bachelor's degree and a master's degree in English, both from Oberlin College. In 1966, she earned a master of education degree (MEd) from Allegheny College.

== Career ==
Curtis's first short story was published in The Magazine of Fantasy & Science Fiction in 1950. Her second story was published later that same year in Imagination. Her work appeared in various publications, including Amazing Stories, Analog Science Fiction and Fact, Authentic Science Fiction, Galaxy Science Fiction, If, Infinity Science Fiction and Marvel Science Stories. In all, she is known to have published sixteen stories from 1950 through 1973. In 1969, she was nominated for a Hugo Award for Best Short Story for "The Steiger Effect".

Curtis also wrote poetry and essays, and edited a zine called The Cricket. Curtis was known for her costuming skills, and was an active member of the Society for Creative Anachronism. She corresponded with Robert A. Heinlein for many years, and at his request she accepted the Hugo Award for Stranger in a Strange Land in 1962.

== Publications ==
In addition to the stories listed below, Curtis wrote and published poetry and essays.

- "Divine Right" (1950, The Magazine of Fantasy & Science Fiction)
- "The Old Ones" (1950, Imagination)
- "First Generation" (1951, Orb)
- "The Protector" (1951, Galaxy Science Fiction)
- "The Ones" (1951, Marvel Science Fiction)
- "A Peculiar People" (1951, The Magazine of Fantasy & Science Fiction)
- "By Induction" (1952, Orb)
- "Temptress of Planet Delight" (1953, Planet Stories)
- "The Trap" (1953, Galaxy Science Fiction)
- "Of the Fittest" (1954, Universe)
- "Rebuttal" (1956, Infinity Science Fiction)
- "Conservative Choice" (1963, Vorpal Glass)
- "Latter-Day Daniel" (1967, If)
- "The Steiger Effect" (1968, Analog)
- "The Key to Out" (1970, in Anne McCaffrey, ed., Alchemy and Academe)
- "Earth to Earth" (1972, Amazing Science Fiction)
- "Of Course" (1973, Amazing Science Fiction)

== Personal life ==
McGee married biologist William Edgar "Ed" Curtis, the son of plant pathologist Otis Freeman Curtis, in 1941; they had four children, including editor Maggie Thompson. Her husband died in 1975, and Curtis died in 2002, at the age of 84, in Meadville, Pennsylvania. A manuscript by Curtis is in the special collections library at Syracuse University.
