= Gary Groth =

American comic book editor, publisher and critic (born 1954)

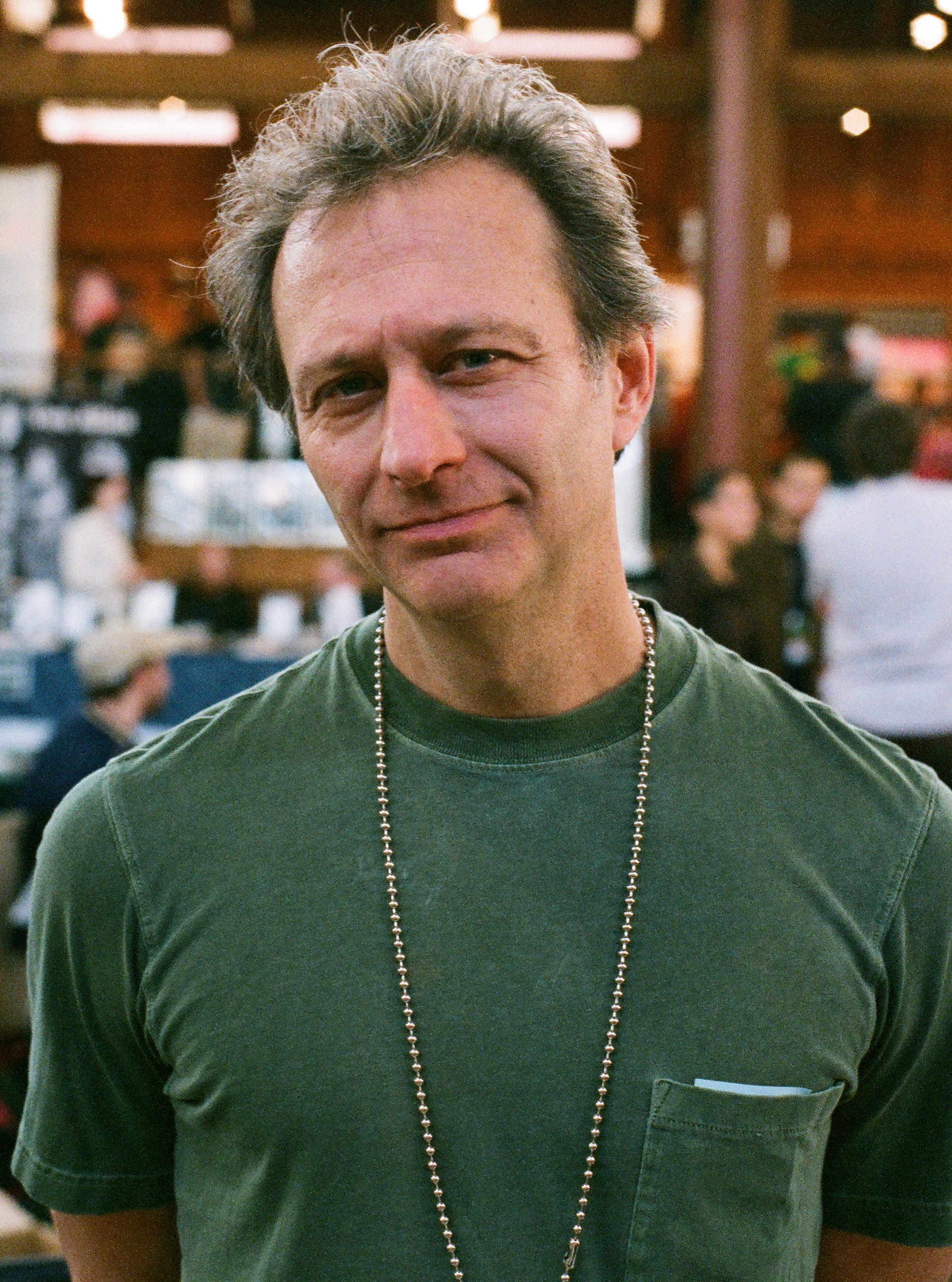
- Groth in 2007
- Born: September 18, 1954 (age 72) Buenos Aires, Argentina
- Areas: Editor, Publisher
- Notable works: The Comics Journal; Fantagraphics Books
- Awards: Inkpot Award (1988)

Gary Groth (born September 18, 1954) is an American comic book editor, publisher and critic. He is editor-in-chief of The Comics Journal, a co-founder of Fantagraphics Books, and founder of the Harvey Awards.

== Early life ==
Groth is the son of a U.S. Navy contractor and was raised in Springfield, Virginia, in the Washington, D.C. area. He read his first comic book in a pediatrician's office.

== Career ==
=== Fanzines and pop culture conventions ===
Inspired by film critics like Andrew Sarris and Pauline Kael, and gonzo journalists like Hunter S. Thompson, the teenage Groth published Fantastic Fanzine, a comics fanzine (whose name referenced the Marvel Comics title Fantastic Four).

In 1970, 1971, and 1973 he organized Metro Con, a comics convention held in the Washington, D.C. area.

Later, after turning down an editorial assistant position at Marvel Comics in 1973, Groth worked briefly as a production and layout assistant at the movie and comics magazine Mediascene, which was edited by Jim Steranko.

After dropping out of his fourth college in 1974, Groth and his financial partner Michael Catron put on a rock and roll convention that ended in financial failure. Nonetheless, he and Catron dabbled in music publishing with the short-lived magazine Sounds Fine.

=== Fantagraphics ===
In 1976, Groth founded Fantagraphics Books, Inc. with Catron and Kim Thompson, and took over an adzine named The Nostalgia Journal—quickly renaming it The Comics Journal. Groth's Comics Journal applied rigorous critical standards to comic books. It disparaged formulaic superhero books and work for hire publishers and favored artists like R. Crumb and Art Spiegelman and creator ownership of copyrights. It featured lengthy, freewheeling interviews with comics professionals, often conducted by Groth himself.

Groth's first editorial in The Nostalgia Journal began a lengthy feud with Alan Light, founder, and at that time, publisher of The Buyer's Guide for Comics Fandom.

Groth and Light were friends before Light published Groth's final issue of Fantastic Fanzine; Light's expedient business methods met with Groth's disapproval. Fandom: Confidential, Ron Frantz's history of the WE Seal of approval program (WSA), outlines Groth's confrontations with Light at conventions and via late night collect calls. Light in turn cashed a check for a Comics Journal advertisement that he refused to print. Groth acquired a copy of the WSA mailing list, and without authorization, used it to solicit subscriptions; Groth later apologized for what he claimed was a misunderstanding, and soon after broke ties with WSA. In 1983 when Light sold TBG, a Groth editorial denounced Light. Light's subsequent libel suit against Groth was eventually dismissed.

Groth's 1991 Comics Journal editorial "Lies We Cherish: The Canonization of Carol Kalish", which criticized what he saw as the unwarranted hagiographies for then-recently deceased former Marvel Comics Vice President of New Product Development, whom Groth characterized as "selling cretinous junk to impressionable children", caused controversy within the industry, including outrage by Kalish's friend and colleague, writer Peter David.

== Bibliography ==
- Groth, Gary, and Robert Fiore, eds. The New Comics: Interviews from the Pages of The Comics Journal. New York : Berkley, 1988. ISBN 0-425-11366-3.
