= Standard Catalog of Comic Books =

The Standard Catalog of Comic Books is the world's largest book about comic books. A joint production of the team behind Comics Buyer's Guide magazine and the CD-ROM program ComicBase, the first edition was released in 2002 from Krause Publications, known today as F+W Publications. The authors of the series are Maggie Thompson, Brent Frankenhoff, Peter Bickford, and John Jackson Miller.

The fourth edition, released in 2005, is 1,624 pages long and indexes more than 165,000 comic books, including information about comic-book creators, story titles, publication dates, and cover prices. The book also includes pricing for comics, including indexes of actual auction results from auction sites including eBay. The Standard Catalog is also a repository for comic-book circulation figures, including sales histories from the U.S. Postal Service, Diamond Comic Distributors, Capital City Distribution, and the comics publishers themselves. The fifth edition was released in 2008 on DVD as a 3437 page pdf document and indexes more than 180,000 comic books.
