= Comics & Games Retailer =

- Categories: Business magazine
- Frequency: Monthly
- Founded: 1992
- Final issue Number: August 2007; 185
- Country: United States
- Based in: Iola, Wisconsin
- Language: English

Comics & Games Retailer was the longest-running periodical serving retailers who sell comic books, collectible card games, and role-playing games until it ceased publication in 2007. The headquarters was in Iola, Wisconsin.

== History and profile ==
Launched in April 1992 by Krause Publications (later acquired by F+W Publications Inc. in 2002), the free-to-retailers monthly magazine was a spinoff from that company’s consumer magazine, Comics Buyer's Guide.

The publication was originally known as Comics Retailer, and in 2002 changed to Comics & Games Retailer. Early columnists included many retailers and experts on retailing, including Bruce Costa, Brian Hibbs, Scott Haring, Preston Sweet, Bob Gray, and Harry Friedman. Hired in 1993, its editor of longest tenure, John Jackson Miller, added “Market Beat,” a section of retailer sales reports; coverage of the game industry; and statistical analysis of comics and game sales.

Given its availability only to those working behind the scenes, the magazine’s opinion columns have often been the flashpoint of both controversy and new ideas for the hobby. In 1996, business researchers from the University of Kentucky and Rutgers University joined with the magazine to conduct a study of retailer attitudes toward distributors and publishers. In 2001, columnist Joe Field suggested in the magazine that Diamond launch a Free Comic Book Day – which later became an industry tradition. In 2002, columnist Brian Hibbs filed a class-action suit on behalf of retailers against Marvel Comics over its trade terms. As a consequence he moved his "Titling at Windmills" column, first to Newsarama then to Comic Book Resources. His last column in Comics Retailer was in the May 1992 issue. The first one hundred installments of "Titling at Windmills" have been collected in book form by IDW Publishing.

Following Miller’s departure in 2003 to begin a comics-writing career, the magazine was run by separate editors for each product category until 2005, with the naming of James Mishler as its sole managing editor. The last issue of the magazine, 185, appeared in August 2007.
