= WE Seal of approval program =

Consumer protection/anti mail fraud program

WE Seal of Approval Program (WSA) was a consumer protection/anti mail fraud program that assisted collectors of nostalgia between 1970 and 1984 who had been victimized by fraudulent advertisers in hobbyist magazines. It aided collectors of comic books, Star Trek, movie memorabilia, pulp magazines, and baseball cards. Comic fandom historian Sean Kleefeld has dubbed it "an ersatz Better Business Bureau for the comic fandom industry while it was moving from amateur to professional capabilities."

== Origins ==
WSA was started by Stanley Blair, a retired accountant and publisher of Stan's Weekly Express (also known as WE), an early adzine for collectors started in 1969. When one of the advertisers proved fraudulent Blair took it upon himself to gather evidence and cooperate with appropriate authorities in the capture and prosecution of the defrauder, with restitution made to the victims. Blair had personal expenses of just over $200 for pursuing the case. Ron Frantz notes "The grateful victims took up a collection without [Blair's] knowledge. The funds exceeded Blair's actual expenses. This money was placed in a special account for the investigation of future mail frauds." At this time Blair created the WE Reporting Bureau and WE Seal of Approval, "dedicated to fair play in the hobby and suggested professional methods of doing business by mail". After an illness and the emergence of The Buyer's Guide for Comics Fandom (TBG) as the main marketplace for comic book back issue advertising, Blair shut down his magazine in 1973 with issue no.100/102 and under the umbrella of the National Central Bureau (NCB) devoted full-time to the WSA Program and associated activities.

== Development and growth ==
Membership in the WSA program initially was free, although dues eventually were instituted to help defray the expenses of the all volunteer staff. Members were assigned a membership number which they were to display in all hobbyist advertising. The number was part of the distinctive WSA logo, a small square with the words National Central Bureau along the top three sides and WSA in large letters in the center and the membership number along the bottom edge. Gary Cifra recalls as a mail order book comic book dealer in the 1970s that receiving a WSA number was seen as "officially recognizing my sales, condition grading and advertising integrity."

WSA investigated all mail fraud cases brought to their attention, whether the parties involved were members or not. As of 1976 there were over 800 active members. Initially members were kept informed of WSA activities via the NCB Report, fifteen of which were issued between Nov. 1973 and January 1975, along with alerts sent to members who had submitted self-addressed stamped envelopes to receive them. Also TBG as the official organ of the group regularly published the "WSA News & Report" column written by the administrator. The publishers of the fanzines Rocket's Blast/Comics Collector, TBG, and Xenophile formed an alliance negotiated with WSA whereupon if Blair informed them of mail fraud by an individual that person's advertising privileges would be withdrawn. Also whenever they received fraud complaints these, along with supporting documents, were forwarded to WSA.

Over the years WSA worked with various governmental investigative and prosecuting entities, including the Federal Trade Commission, the Postal Inspection Service, Federal Bureau of Investigation, plus various Congress members and state Attorneys General. Ron Frantz noted "One-third of the cases were simple disputes between buyer and seller, resulting from misunderstandings, personal problems, or postal delays. The remaining cases involved situations where intent to defraud was clearly established. Many of the cases involved multiple complaints against the same defendant".

Blair's old adzine, now an organ for WSA and strictly known as WE, was revived in 1976 with issue 103 and a paid circulation of 350; it lasted until at least issue 138 (1980).

== Dissension and eventual dissolution ==
In later years the organization got embroiled in internal dissension along with getting caught up in the infamous Alan Light/Gary Groth feud. A directory of members provided the basis of The Fandom Directory published for over two decades by Harry Hopkins and which precipitated a falling out between Blair and Hopkins. WSA also had somewhat contentious relations with the Star Trek Welcommittee.

By the early 1980s the organization began fading into obscurity. To some extent the CBG Customer Service Award instituted by Krause Publications when they took over publishing Comics Buyer's Guide in 1983 served a function similar to the WSA logo, signifying an advertiser had a clean bill of health.

And the legacy of WSA includes, as Frantz notes, that "over a period of fifteen years, more than $100,000 was collected and returned to mail-fraud victims".

Some copies of WE are held at the Michigan State University Comic Art Collection, along with various WSA program materials.

== Administrators ==
- Stan Blair (1970–1975)
- Ron Frantz (1975–1977)
- Harry Hopkins (1977–1979)
- Michael Wahl (1979–1984)
