= The Steiger Effect =

1968 short story by Betsy Curtis

"The Steiger Effect" is a science fiction short story by Betsy Curtis. It was first published in Analog Science Fiction in October 1968.

== Synopsis ==
Human merchants sell internal combustion engines to a planet whose inhabitants view the devices as magic — and when the humans leave, the engines stop working, because internal combustion only functions in the presence of a psionic field unknowingly emitted by humans.

== Reception ==
"The Steiger Effect" was a finalist for the 1969 Hugo Award for Best Short Story.

Galactic Journey noted that "'Humans secretly have psi powers and don't know it' certainly sounds like a plot tailor-made for [Analog editor] Campbell", and observed that the aliens' social stratification ("Men" who use their minds, and "Boys" who use their muscle) was uncomfortably evocative of "antebellum days in the American South".

== Title ==
Historian Maggie Thompson – Curtis's daughter – has described the story's premise as "there are people who have a sort of 'repairing field' [said Steiger Effect] around them – which is why, for example, your car runs fine when you have it at the service station but renews the grinding noise after you've driven away", and noted that "[o]ur local service station was run by Mr. Steiger."
