= Stephen Thompson (journalist) =

American writer and editor (born 1972)

- Born: August 1, 1972 (age 54); Iola, Wisconsin, U.S.
- Education: University of Wisconsin–Madison
- Occupation: Journalist
- Years active: 1992–present
- Employer(s): NPR; The Onion/The A.V. Club (1992-2004)
- Mother: Maggie Thompson
- Relatives: Betsy Curtis (grandmother)

Stephen Thompson (born August 1, 1972) is a host, commentator, writer, and editor for NPR and NPR Music. He is a regular on the NPR podcasts Pop Culture Happy Hour and All Songs Considered, a recurring guest host of NPR's New Music Friday, and also serves as an occasional music commentator for Morning Edition. He created the NPR Music video series Tiny Desk Concerts with Bob Boilen in 2008.

== Biography ==
Stephen Thompson was born to news editors Don and Maggie Thompson and raised in Iola, Wisconsin. He graduated from the University of Wisconsin–Madison in 1994, where he helped found student-run radio station WSUM. He joined The Onion as an entertainment writer in November 1992. In the summer of 1993, he founded and became editor of the paper’s entertainment section, which was dubbed The A.V. Club in 1995. Thompson served as copy editor for The Onion’s comedy section and first six humor books, from 1999's #1 New York Times best-seller Our Dumb Century through 2004's The Onion Ad Nauseam, Vol. 15. In December 2004, Thompson was fired one week before publication of The Tenacity Of The Cockroach: Conversations With Entertainment's Most Enduring Outsiders, a book which he edited.

When Lady Gaga allegedly refused to allow "Weird Al" Yankovic to parody her single "Born This Way," Thompson broke the news that it was Gaga's manager who had denied the request without her knowledge. Once brought to her attention, Lady Gaga approved Yankovic's parody.

In 2017, the Green Bay Packers made a 22-minute documentary on Thompson's love for the team as part of its "Packers Life" series on Spectrum Sports.

As a freelance entertainment and humor writer, Thompson has been published in Paste magazine, The Washington Post, The Guardian, and McSweeney’s. In 1999, he also co-founded The Onion’s softball team, the haplessness of which he chronicled in loving but often grisly detail at www.teamonion.com. Thompson lives in Silver Spring, Maryland, and has two children.

== Edited works ==
- Thompson, Stephen; A.V. Club Staff (10 December 2004). The Tenacity of the Cockroach: Conversations With Entertainment's Most Enduring Outsiders. Three Rivers Press. ISBN 9780609809914.
