= Fat Jack's Comicrypt =

American comic book store

- Industry: Comic book sales
- Founded: 1976
- Headquarters: Philadelphia, Pennsylvania and Oaklyn, New Jersey
- Number of locations: 2
- Owner: Mike Ferraro

Fat Jack's Comicrypt or Fat Jack's is a comic book store with locations in Philadelphia, Pennsylvania and Oaklyn, New Jersey. The Philadelphia store, located at 2006 Sansom Street, was founded by Mike Ferraro in 1976. It is the oldest comic book store in Philadelphia and one of the ten oldest comic book stores in the United States.

In May 2024, the Philadelphia location formerly located at 2006 Sansom St was closed after the loss of the lease.

Following the Philadelphia store closure, the Oaklyn New Jersey store was closed for the first three weeks of June with signs and a Facebook post saying it would reopen on June 15th after owner Mike recovered from COVID. Before this date, the Regional New Jersey Fire Marshell shut the store down for numerous code violations. The ceiling of the store had partiatally collapsed by the entrance several months prior leaving a hazard for patrons. As well as severe water leaks towards the back of the store blocking the usage of a large portion of the shelves and leaving a moldy odor when shopping.

As of September 2024, both locations remain closed with no posts on social media or any work done at the Oaklyn store to show if the shop may come back.

On Friday, January 17, 2025, Mike Ferrero died suddenly at age 73.
