= Murray Bishoff =

American novelist

Murray Bishoff is a writer at The Monett Times in Monett, Missouri. Formerly a contributor to Comics Buyer's Guide, Bishoff won an Inkpot Award in 1980. Bishoff is also known for his research and writings on the 1901 fifteen-hour lynching spree in Pierce City, Missouri, during which white residents murdered three African American residents and caused nearly 300 others to flee the city. His writings include a series of articles published to commemorate the 90th anniversary of the event and the historical novel Cry of Thunder. In addition, the town's cemetery holds a marker to the event paid for in large part by Bishoff and the Pierce City Museum hosts an exhibit which Bishoff created. He has also publicly spoken about the event to CNN and appears in a documentary about the event, Banished: How Whites Drove Blacks out of Town in America.

Bishoff is the vice-president of the Harold Bell Wright Museum in Pierce City.
