= Otis Freeman Curtis =

Otis Freeman Curtis (12 February 1888, Sendai, Japan – 4 July 1949, Cape Cod, Massachusetts) was an American botanist and plant physiologist, at the State Agricultural Experimental Station, and professor of botany at Cornell University. He made important contributions to the study of translocation.

His parents were in Japan because his father, a Congregational minister, was working as a missionary. He graduated in 1911 with A.B. from Oberlin College and, influenced by Susan Percival Nichol, focused on botany. He was a graduate student at Cornell University from 1911. In 1916 he was awarded a Ph.D. from Cornell University. There he was an instructor in plant physiology from 1913 to 1917, an assistant professor from 1917 to 1922, and a full professor from 1922 until his death. Among his doctoral students was Thomas Wyatt Turner, the first Black American to receive a PhD in botany.

He was recognised for his expertise on translocation and published around 30 papers about vegetative reproduction, translocation, temperature and water relations of plants. He was the author of the monograph The Translocation of Solutes in Plants in 1935 that, through critical review, encouraged further research in this area. He also posthumously co-authored An Introduction to Plant Physiology with D. G. Clark.

Upon his death he was survived by his widow, two sons, a daughter, and six grandchildren.
