= Maggie Thompson =

American editor and columnist

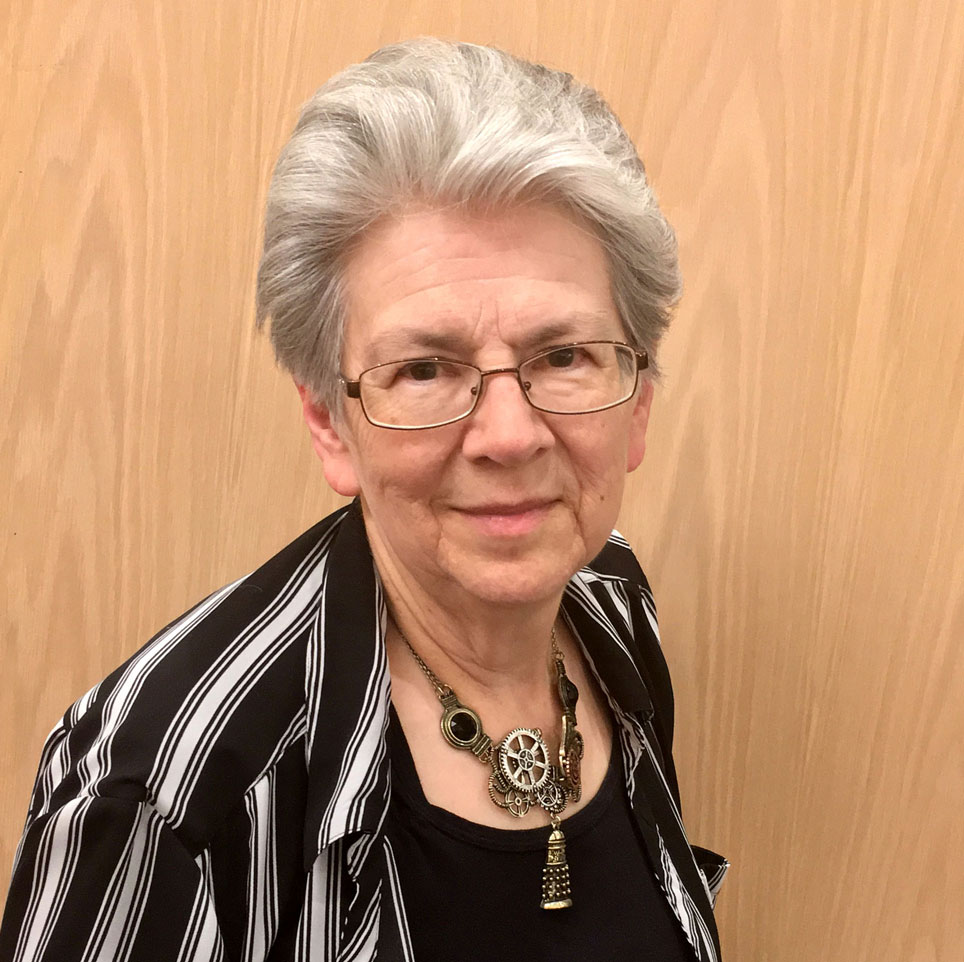
- Thompson at Wizard World Chicago, 2017
- Born: Margaret Curtis; November 29, 1942 (age 83)
- Areas: Writer, Editor
- Pseudonym: Arthur Judson (when collaborating with late husband Don Thompson)
- Notable works: Comics Buyer's Guide
- Awards: Bob Clampett Humanitarian Award; Eisner Award; Inkpot Award; Jack Kirby Award; Harvey Award
- Spouse: Don Thompson (m. 1962; died 1994)
- Relatives: Betsy Curtis (mother); Stephen Thompson (son); Harold McGee (cousin)

Maggie Thompson (born Margaret Curtis; November 29, 1942) is an American longtime editor of the now-defunct comic book industry news magazine Comics Buyer's Guide, science fiction fan, and collector of comics.

== Early life ==
Margaret (nickname, "Maggie") Curtis was born November 29, 1942. Her mother, science fiction writer Betsy Curtis, would be nominated for the Hugo Award for Best Short Story in 1969 for her story "The Steiger Effect"; she carried on a long correspondence with colleagues such as Robert Heinlein and L. Ron Hubbard. According to family tradition, Betsy claimed descent from Anne Bradstreet and at least two presidents of Yale University.

Thompson and her late husband and fellow science fiction fan Don Thompson (October 30, 1935 – May 23, 1994) were among the instigators of what developed in the 1960s into comic book fandom.

Their Harbinger (a mimeographed one-sheet published in the autumn of 1960) announced the upcoming publication of Comic Art, one of the early amateur magazines devoted to all aspects of sequential art (a term not then in use). The initial issue of Comic Art was released the following spring. Seven issues were published at irregular intervals between 1961 and 1968. As publication of Comic Art wound down, they shifted their attention to a new venture as the Thompsons started a fanzine titled Newfangles in March 1967. Unlike other comics news fanzines of the time it was devoted to the doings of comics fandom instead of news about comic books and comic book professionals.

== Career ==
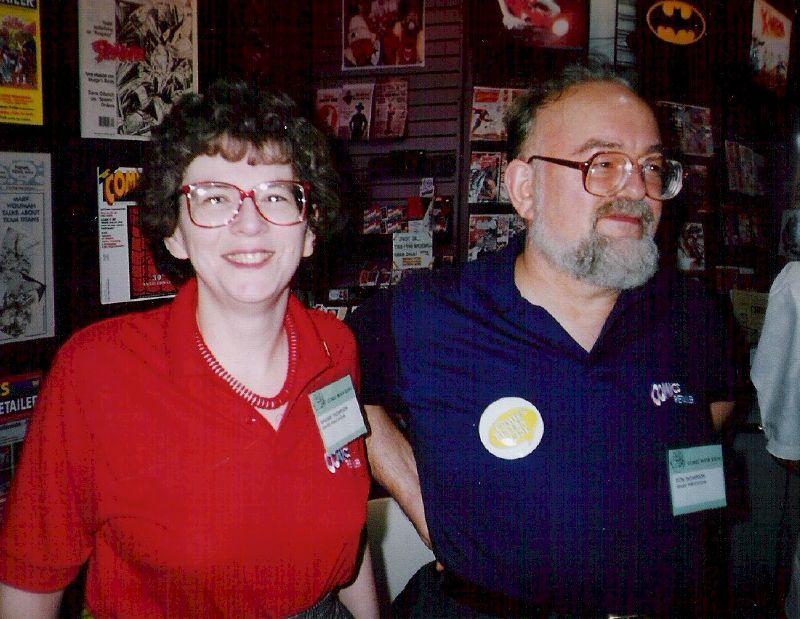
Maggie and Don Thompson at the 1992 San Diego Comic Con

Thompson began working for Krause Publications as the editor of Movie Collector's World and Comics Buyer's Guide in 1983. With her husband Don, she wrote a miscellany of articles and comic-book stories; The Official Price Guide to Science Fiction and Fantasy (1989, House of Collectibles); five years of Comics Buyer's Guide Annual (1992–1996, Krause Publications); Marvel Comics Checklist & Price Guide 1961-Present (1993, Krause Publications); and Comic-Book Superstars (1993, Krause Publications). With others, she produced the Comics Buyer's Guide Checklist & Price Guide (now in its 15th edition, Krause Publications); and the Standard Catalog of Comic Books (now in its 5th edition, Krause Publications). Working solo, Thompson created and edited Fantasy Empire magazine for New Media in 1981 and wrote Dark Shadows: Book Two - Lost in Thought #1-4 in 1993 for Innovation Comics.

Krause later sold the movie newspaper, but Thompson continued to edit Comics Buyer's Guide, long after her husband's death in 1994 and the transformation of the publication into a monthly magazine. In 2013 she began a column for San Diego Comic-Con's Toucan blog called "Maggie's World".

== Personal life ==
Maggie married fellow fan and writer/editor Don Thompson in 1962. They had two children before his death May 23, 1994. Her son is journalist Stephen Thompson, co-creator of the NPR Music video series Tiny Desk Concerts and co-host of NPR's Pop Culture Happy Hour. Maggie also has a daughter, Valerie, and three grandchildren.

== Accolades ==
Under Maggie's editorial direction, Comics Buyer's Guide twice won the comics industry's Eisner Award for periodicals, among other awards. She was a recipient of the Bob Clampett Humanitarian Award and was also the first recipient of the Friends of Lulu's Women of Distinction Award.

Maggie and Don Thompson received many joint awards, including:

- Comic Fan Art Award Favorite Fan Writer, 1973 & 1974
- Inkpot Award, 1976
- Jack Kirby Award, Best Comics Publication, 1985
- Diamond Lifetime Fandom Award, 1991
- Eisner Award, Best Comics-Related Periodical, 1992
- Harvey Award, Comics Industry Pioneer Award, 2019
- Eisner Award, Hall of Fame, 2020

=== Thompson Award ===
The Motor City Comic Con awarded the Don Thompson Award from 1992 to 1998. Originally known as the "Compuserve Comics and Animation Forum Award," the name was changed to the "Compuserve Comics and Animation Forum's Don Thompson Award" (or, simply, the "Thompson") after Don Thompson's death in 1994.
