= 1989 Academy Awards =

1989 Academy Awards may refer to:

- 61st Academy Awards, the Academy Awards ceremony that took place in 1989
- 62nd Academy Awards, the 1990 ceremony honoring the best in film for 1989
