= Dennis King (author) =

American author

- Born: Dennis Michael King; September 24, 1952 (age 74); Oakland, California
- Occupations: Author, Archivist, Art Director, Curator, Producer, Entrepreneur
- Writing career
- Years active: 1971–present
- Website: www.dking-gallery.com rockpostercollector.com

Dennis Michael King (born September 24, 1952) is an American author of books on rock music posters, related memorabilia, and sports cards. He contributed to The Art of Rock by Paul Grushkin, a 1987 book on rock posters of the 1960s and 1970.

== Career ==
=== Collectibles dealer ===
King began collecting rock posters and other memorabilia as a teenager in the early 1960s and started selling them in 1971 at a flea market in Alameda, California and other outlets. After funding his education by dealing in collectible sports cards, comic books, poster art, and related ephemera, he graduated from UC Berkeley with a degree in mathematics. After completing a brief period of high school teaching, he decided to pursue a full-time career in collectible memorabilia. He opened his first dedicated brick and mortar retail storefront, King's Baseball Cards and Comic Books, in the Durant Mall in the Telegraph Avenue area of Berkeley, California. In 1982, he relocated the store to Centre Street in downtown Berkeley, where he expanded his offerings and became one of the first retailers to offer authentic MLB team wear to the public.

He opened the D. King Gallery in Berkeley, California in 1996, initially focusing on art exhibitions. However, he eventually shifted the gallery's focus to 1960s rock posters and vintage sports memorabilia. King has also maintained an online store since 1997, and he owns the adjunct King's Comics, which sells vintage comic books and related merchandise.

=== Writer ===
Following, The Art of Rock, Grushkin and King co-authored The Art of Modern Rock: The Poster Explosion in 2004, on which King was the Art Director. The Poster Explosion features a collection of over 1,800 posters, which examines the resurgence and expansion of the art form's popularity, style, and influence. The book also included a discussion of the history of silk-screening and its commercial applications following its industrialization, with the work of artists like Frank Kozik, Uncle Charlie, Art Chantry, and Yee Haw Industries. The book was published in French as L’Art du Rock in 2005. King was the sole author of a pair of follow-up books, Art of Rock Mini #1: A-Z (2007), and Art of Rock Mini #2: Poster Girls (2008), which were published in smaller formats. He also contributed to The Hammer of God: The Art of Malleus Rock Art Lab, a book dedicated to the Italian poster art collective.

King has also penned articles for Juxtapoz, where he interviewed poster artist Derek Hess. In 1991, he founded and published Japanese Baseball Card Quarterly and published The Rock Poster Collector in 1998.

=== Collector ===
King was the curator of the "Art of Modern Rock: The Poster Explosion" exhibit, which was shown at the Bumbershoot Multi-Disciplinary Arts Festival in Seattle and then at the Experience Music Project museum in Seattle in May 2006. The exhibit featured the work of more than 300 artists from King's personal collection. King's images were featured in the Art of Modern Rock wall calendars in 2008 and 2009.

King was a founding member of the Sports Collectibles Association International, which advocated for ethical practices in the sports collectibles industry. King is also a member of the Ephemera Society of America.
