= Comics Buyer's Guide =

American magazine

- Comics Buyer's Guide #1600 (January 2005)
- Editor: Brent Frankenhoff (2006–2013)
- Senior Editor: Maggie Thompson (from 2006)
- Managing Editor: John Jackson Miller (from 1998)
- Project Editor: Brent Frankenhoff (1998–2006)
- Former editors: Alan Light (1971–1983); Maggie Thompson (1983–2006)
- Staff writers: Murray Bishoff, Peter David, Shel Dorf, Mark Evanier, Martin L. Greim, Tony Isabella, Heidi MacDonald, Catherine Yronwode
- Categories: comic books news and criticism
- Frequency: monthly (Feb. 1971 – Aug. 1972) twice-monthly (Aug. 1972 – July 1975) weekly (July 1975 – June 2004) monthly (June 2004 – Mar. 2013)
- Publisher: Alan Light (1971–1983); Krause Publications (1983–2013)
- Total circulation: 20,000 (late 1980s)
- Founder: Alan Light
- First issue: March 1971
- Final issue Number: March 2013; 1,699
- Company: F+W Media (2002–2013)
- Country: United States
- Based in: Iola, Wisconsin (from 1983)
- Language: English
- Website: www.cbgxtra.com
- ISSN: 0745-4570

Comics Buyer's Guide (CBG; ISSN 0745-4570), previously called The Buyer's Guide for Comic Fandom, was the longest-running English-language periodical reporting on the American comic book industry. It was founded in 1971 by Alan Light, a 17-year-old comic book collector in the Quad Cities region who oversaw it until 1983. That year, Light accepted an offer from Krause Publications, and operations moved to Iola, Wisconsin and the name changed to Comics Buyer's Guide. Annual Comics Buyer's Guide Fan Awards were established, and they were awarded 1983–circa 2010. Due to a decreased market for a comic book trade publication, the Comics Buyer's Guide released its last issue in March 2013.

== History ==
=== Alan Light years: 1971–1983 ===
CBG was founded in February 1971 by Alan Light under the title The Buyer's Guide for Comic Fandom (TBG) as a monthly newspaper in a tabloid format. TBG began primarily as an advertising venue – known in comics fandom as an "adzine", i.e. a fanzine devoted to ads. Ron Frantz, in his book Fandom: Confidential, traces the lineage of Light's endeavor to Stan's Weekly Express (aka WE), a pioneering adzine published from 1969 to 1973, whose bare-bones approach was inspired by an "obscure journal of flower advertising known as Joe's Bulletin". Frantz also provides background on Light's interaction with the WE Seal of approval program, with which he cooperated in order to help combat mail fraud. Frantz in addition describes the infamous long-running feud between Light and Comics Journal founder Gary Groth.

TBG's frequency was changed to twice-monthly with issue #18 (August 1, 1972). Besides occasional letter columns, beginning with issue #19 (Aug. 15, 1972), prominent fans Don and Maggie Thompson began a monthly column, "Beautiful Balloons." A news column, "What Now?" by Murray Bishoff, was added with #26 (Dec. 1, 1972). These provided the editorial content required by the United States Postal Service to qualify for second class mail (along with paid subscriptions being instituted with issue #27, January 1, 1973). At this time, TBG's circulation was about 3,600 copies.

TBG went weekly with issue #86 (July 18, 1975). In 1977, TBG's circulation topped 10,000. Cat Yronwode succeeded Bishoff as news reporter with issue #329 (March 7, 1980), renaming the column "Fit to Print".

=== Krause Publications years: 1983–2002 ===
In 1983, The Buyer's Guide was purchased by Krause Publications. Columnists Don and Maggie Thompson were hired as editors. Krause changed the name with their first issue #482 (February 11, 1983) to Comics Buyer's Guide. At that time Krause instituted the controversial CBG Customer Service Award, the display of which signifies an advertiser had a "clean bill of health". By the late 1980s, the publication had more than 20,000 subscribers.

Writer Peter David's column, "But I Digress...", joined the publication in 1990. The magazine added Mark Evanier's column "P.O.V." in late 1994.

In 1992, the magazine spun off its distributor and retailer news into a separate periodical, Comics & Games Retailer (which ceased publication in 2007). Co-editor Don Thompson died on May 23, 1994. In 1998, Krause brought on John Jackson Miller as managing editor and Brent Frankenhoff as projects editor, with Maggie Thompson remaining as editor.

CBG was named Best Comics Publication in the 1985 Kirby Awards, and it was given the Eisner Award for Best Comics-Related Periodical/Publication in 1992 and 1993.

In July 2002, Krause was acquired by F+W Publications.

=== F+W Publications years: 2002–2013 ===
With issue #1595 (June 2004), CBG changed its format from a weekly tabloid to a monthly perfect bound magazine. In addition, in hopes of enhancing newsstand sales, CBG added a price guide for contemporary comics as well as other new features intended to make the magazine more appealing to those with an avid interest in comic books as an investment. This marketing strategy was also tied to the yearly publication of the Standard Catalog of Comic Books, produced in conjunction with Human Computing, the makers of the comic collectors' software ComicBase.

In July 2005, the magazine began archiving past features at its CBGXtra.com service. Brett Frankenhoff was promoted to CBG Editor in 2006, with Maggie Thompson assuming the title of Senior Editor. In late 2009, CBG's page count was reduced, the perfect binding ended, and some of the features changed, including the removal of the price guide listings.

==== Cancelation and legacy ====
On January 9, 2013, Krause Publications announced the cancellation of Comics Buyer's Guide effective with issue #1699 (March 2013). The website CBGXtra and its Facebook page continued as archived resources for a time but are no longer online, replaced by the website of the new owner Antique Trader.

Alter Ego #122 (Jan. 2014) was a tribute issue devoted to Comics Buyer's Guide, with features regarding what would have made the 1700th CBG issue if the magazine had continued.

A complete collection of TBG/CBG is held by the Michigan State University Comic Art Collection.

== Columnists ==
CBG hosted many columns over the years in addition to Don and Maggie Thompson's "Beautiful Balloons", Murray Bishoff's "What Now?", and Cat Yronwode's "Fit to Print". With issue #25 (Nov. 15, 1972) Martin L. Greim, publisher of the fanzine The Comic Crusader, began to contribute an occasional column initially titled "M. L. G. on Comics", that later would be known as "Crusader Comments". With issue #162 in 1976 Shel Dorf began an occasional series "Shel Dorf and the Fantasy Makers" interviewing creators in comics, television and film. Another columnist in the 1970s was David Scroggy.

Another column was Robert Ingersoll's "The Law is A [sic] Ass!". The column dealt with how comics writers erred in their depiction of the law, and what Ingersoll thought they should have done. It also dealt with procedural errors.

In the CBG era, the magazine has been noted for its letter column "Oh, So?", as well as columns by Peter David, Tony Isabella, Catherine Yronwode, Rick Norwood, Mark Evanier, John Jackson Miller, Bob Ingersoll, Heidi MacDonald, Rik Offenberger, Chuck Rozanski ("Tales from the Database"), Craig Shutt, Beau Smith, Andrew Smith, and others. As part of the June 2004 switch to monthly publication, Maggie Thompson revived the "Beautiful Balloons" column.

== Cartoons and strips ==
Cartoonists whose work appeared in CBG include Marc Hansen, Dan Vebber, Fred Hembeck, Mark Martin, Batton Lash, and others. For some years CBG reprinted installments of The Spirit comic strip by Will Eisner. The panel cartoon "Last Kiss" by John Lustig was also among the longtime fixtures. Professional comic book artists such as Jack Kirby, C.C. Beck and Alex Toth, as well as otherwise-unknown fan artists, regularly contributed covers along with headers and spot illustrations to the "Beautiful Balloons" and "Fit to Print" columns.

== Comics Buyer's Guide Fan Awards ==
CBG administered the annual Comics Buyer's Guide Fan Awards from 1983 to circa 2010, with the first awards announced in issue #500 (June 17, 1983).

Upon taking over as CBG editors, Don and Maggie Thompson aspired to bring back a series of comic book fan awards like the Goethe Awards, which they had administered in the first half of the 1970s. (The Goethe Award — later known as the Comic Fan Art Award — originated with the Thompsons' fanzine Newfangles and then shared close ties with The Buyer's Guide to Comics Fandom. Perhaps not coincidentally, TBG was given the Goethe Award for Favorite Fanzine in 1972.)

The format and balloting of the CBG Fan Awards were in many ways derived from the Goethe Award/Comic Fan Art Award. The awards were initially voted on by CBG subscribers; the voting was later opened up to everyone. As many as 5,000 votes were cast per year during the 1990s.

The awards were often presented at the annual Chicago Comicon until 1996 (when the Wizard Fan Awards moved in); from that point forward the CBG Award results were simply published in the magazine.
