= Overstreet Comic Book Price Guide =

Annual American value guide

The Overstreet Comic Book Price Guide (or Official Overstreet Comic Book Price Guide) is an annually published comic book price guide widely considered the primary authority on the subject of American comic book grading and pricing in the hobby/industry.

Many observers have connected the growth of the direct market distribution system and comic book specialty shops to the general acceptance of Overstreet's annual guide as a standardized inventory and pricing system.

Begun in 1970 by Robert M. Overstreet as a guide for fellow fans of Golden Age and Silver Age comics, the Overstreet guide has expanded to cover virtually the entire history of the American comics publication as far back as the Victorian Age and Platinum Age. The annual edition also covers promotional comics (giveaways and advertising) and "big little books", while continually updating new publications and market reports that cover the prior year of market activity.

Overstreet's annual guide to the comic book collecting hobby has itself become a collectible, and since the 1980s each edition of the Price Guide includes a page listing collector's values for older editions, with hardcover editions, in particular, selling for a premium. Currently, the Price Guide is published in four formats: hardcover, softcover, a larger, ring-bound edition and an electronic edition, often with multiple covers for each version.

== History ==
Robert M. Overstreet grew up as a comic book, coin, and Indian arrowhead collector. In the 1960s, after abandoning a project to create an arrowhead price guide, Overstreet turned his attention to comics, which had no definitive guide.

Comic back-issue prices had stabilized by the end of the 1960s, and, Jerry Bails, who had recently published the Collector's Guide to the First Heroic Age, was considering creating a comic book price guide. He was contacted by Overstreet, who was doing the same thing. Bails' extensive notes, supplemented by Overstreet's study of dealer listings, "became a backbone to the Overstreet Comic Book Price Guide".

Under the auspices of Overstreet Publications, the first Comic Book Price Guide was published in November 1970. Priced at $5, saddle-stitched and published in a print run of 1000 (a second edition of 800 was released subsequently), the book included 218 pages of listings. Among other things, Overstreet's guide included inventory lists, and it instantly became an invaluable resource tool for comic book collectors and dealers. By 1976, the guide had achieved national distribution.

An early decision was made by author to exclude the niche of underground comix, an adult-oriented expression of the art form that Mr. Overstreet had no interest in documenting, for reasons he has never made public, despite the book being promoted by its publisher as "the most complete listing of comics from the 1500s to the present".

=== Overstreet periodicals ===
Throughout the 1980s and 1990s, Overstreet also produced publications with price updates regarding newer comics releases from the present, to selected titles dating from the Silver Age, including a price guide for current and valuable comics, as well as comic book and collector news, and interviews. It also included editorial content from the publishers and from polled bookstore owners. Various incarnations of the publication (which were published quarterly to bi-monthly, and eventually monthly) included Overstreet's Comic Book Price Update, Overstreet's Comics Price Bulletin, Overstreet Comic Book Monthly, and Overstreet's Fan, with this last incarnation showing a great deal of similarity to the successful comics news magazine Wizard: The Guide to Comics. Overstreet also published twenty-one issues of Comic Book Marketplace between Mar./Apr. 1993 and January 1995. Ultimately, most titles were canceled, including Overstreet's Fan which ceased publication in 1997.

=== Sale to Gemstone ===
Overstreet sold the business to Gemstone Publishing in 1994, but continued to release annual guides and associated publications.

In July 2003, Gemstone attempted another monthly by publishing Overstreet's Comic Price Review, which ran for nineteen issues.

Gemstone also published three volumes of the Overstreet Premium Ring Price Guide featuring values of thousands of collectible toy rings of all types, the most valuable of which is the Supermen of America ring, which fetches around $100,000, depending on condition. Original art for volumes 2 and 3 by artist A. Kaviraj can be viewed at Austin's Ring Museum in Las Cruces, New Mexico.

The 52nd edition of the Overstreet Comic Book Price Guide (2022-2023) was released in August 2022.

The 55th edition of the Overstreet Comic Book Price Guide (2025-2026) was released in February 2026. This volume was delayed numerous times from being released in 2025 due to Gemstone Publishing’s parent company Diamond Comic Distributors’ bankruptcy in 2025.

=== Facsimile Edition ===
In connection with the publication's 50th anniversary, Gemstone published Facsimile Edition reprints of both printings of the first edition (1970). The Facsimile Edition of the first printing (white cover) was originally scheduled to be released April 8, 2020 but was delayed due to the coronavirus pandemic.

For each edition, there were four versions: softcover (retail price $16.95), hardcover ($25.00, limited to 400 copies), a signed and numbered hardcover ($50.00, signed by Robert Overstreet and limited to 100 copies), and a deluxe signed and numbered hardcover ($75.00, signed by Robert Overstreet and Steve Geppi, and limited to 50 copies).

== See also ==
- Comic book grading
