= ComicBase =

Windows software for comic book collectors

- Developer(s): Human Computing
- Initial release: March 13, 1992; 33 years ago
- Stable release: 2017 (v19.0.9) / July 5, 2017; 7 years ago
- Operating system: Windows 7 and later
- Available in: English
- Type: Database, comics
- License: Proprietary
- Website: comicbase.com

ComicBase is a computer program for tracking comic book collections. It was created in 1992 by Peter Bickford as an Apple Macintosh program. A Windows version was introduced in 1996. As of February 2015, it is on its nineteenth version (dubbed ComicBase 2017) and is available for computers running Microsoft Windows Windows 7, and later. Its database includes pricing and notes on over 800,000 individual comic book issues, and allows users to sell their comics online at a website marketplace called Atomic Avenue.

ComicBase 2017 includes a "My Comics" web app which uses works in conjunction with the desktop software to allow users to view and update their collections on virtually any mobile device through the use of responsive design techniques, including Apple, Windows, and Android smartphones and tablets, as well as devices like the PSP and Kindle. This feature was introduced with ComicBase 2015. Purchases can be recorded in the mobile web app either by entering in the comics title and issue, or by taking a picture of the comic's barcode using a mobile device's camera.

ComicBase was the first software available on Blu-ray.
