= Eisner Award for Best Comics-Related Periodical/Journalism =

American comic book journalism award

- Awarded for: Journalism and publications about comics
- Country: United States
- First award: 2008
- Most recent winner: SKTCHD, edited by David Harper
- Website: www.comic-con.org/awards/eisner-awards/

The Eisner Award for Best Comics-Related Periodical/Journalism is an award given to journalistic coverage of comics. It has been given out every year since 2008. There were plans to remove the category in 2024, however the change was ultimately not implemented.

== Winners and nominees ==
Year	Title	Producer/Editor	Publisher	Result	Ref.
2000s
2008	Newsarama	Matt Brady and Michael Doran		Winner	
2008	Comic Art #9	Todd Hignite	Buenaventura Press	Finalist	
2008	Comic Foundry	Tim Leong	Comic Foundry	Finalist	
2008	The Comics Journal	Gary Groth, Michael Dean, and Kristy Valenti	Fantagraphics	Finalist	
2008	The Comics Reporter	Tom Spurgeon and Jordan Raphael	www.comicsreporter.com	Finalist	
2009	Comic Book Resources	Jonah Weiland	www.comicbookresources.com	Winner	
2009	Comics Comics	Timothy Hodler and Dan Nadel	www.comicscomicsmag.com (PictureBox)	Finalist	
2009	The Comics Journal	Gary Groth, Michael Dean, and Kristy Valenti	Fantagraphics	Finalist	
2009	The Comics Reporter	Tom Spurgeon and Jordan Raphael	www.comicsreporter.com	Finalist	
2010s
2010	The Comics Reporter	Tom Spurgeon and Jordan Raphael	www.comicsreporter.com	Winner	
2010	Alter Ego	Roy Thomas	TwoMorrows	Finalist	
2010	ComicsAlliance		www.comicsalliance.com	Finalist	
2010	Comics Comics	Timothy Hodler and Dan Nadel	www.comicscomicsmag.com (PictureBox)	Finalist	
2010	The Comics Journal	Gary Groth, Michael Dean, and Kristy Valenti	Fantagraphics	Finalist	
2011	The Comics Reporter	Tom Spurgeon and Jordan Raphael	www.comicsreporter.com	Winner	
2011	Alter Ego	Roy Thomas	TwoMorrows	Finalist	
2011	The Beat	Heidi MacDonald	https://www.comicsbeat.com	Finalist	
2011	ComicsAlliance	Laura Hudson	www.comicsalliance.com	Finalist	
2011	Comic Book Resources	Jonah Weiland		Finalist	
2011	USA Today Comics Section	Dennis Moore and John Geddes		Finalist	
2012	The Comics Reporter	Tom Spurgeon	www.comicsreporter.com	Winner	
2012	The A.V. Club Comics Panel	Noel Murray, Oliver Sava et al.	www.avclub.com/features/comics-panel	Finalist	
2012	The Beat	Heidi MacDonald and others	www.comicsbeat.com	Finalist	
2012	The Comics Journal	Gary Groth, Michael Dean, and Kristy Valenti	Fantagraphics	Finalist	
2012	TwoMorrows Publications: Alter Ego, Back Issue!, Draw, and Jack Kirby Collector	Roy Thomas (Alter Ego), Michael Eury (Back Issue!), Mike Manley (Draw), John Morrow (Jack Kirby Collector)		Finalist	
2013	The Comics Reporter	Tom Spurgeon	www.comicsreporter.com	Winner	
2013	Alter Ego	Roy Thomas	TwoMorrows	Finalist	
2013	ComicsAlliance	Joe Hughes, Caleb Goellner, and Andy Khouri	www.comicsalliance.com	Finalist	
2013	Robot 6	Comic Book Resources	https://robot6.comicbookresources.com/	Finalist	
2013	tcj.com	Timothy Hodler and Dan Nadel	Fantagraphics	Finalist	
2014	Comic Book Resources	Jonah Weiland	www.comicbookresources.com	Winner	
2014	The Comics Journal #302	Gary Groth and Kristy Valenti	Fantagrapahics	Finalist	
2014	Comics and Cola	Zainab Akhtar	www.comicsandcola.com	Finalist	
2014	Multiversity Comics	Matthew Meylikhov	www.multiversitycomics.com	Finalist	
2014	tcj.com	Dan Nadel and Timothy Hodler	www.tcj.com (Fantagrapahics)	Finalist	
2015	ComicsAlliance	Andy Khouri, Caleb Goellner, Andrew Wheeler, and Joe Hughes		Winner	
2015	Alter Ego	Roy Thomas	TwoMorrows	Finalist	
2015	Comic Book Creator	Jon B. Cooke	TwoMorrows	Finalist	
2015	Comic Book Resources	Jonah Weiland	www.comicbookresources.com	Finalist	
2015	tcj.com	Dan Nadel and Timothy Hodler	Fantagraphics	Finalist	
2016	Hogan's Alley	Tom Heintjes	Hogan's Alley	Winner	
2016	Alter Ego	Roy Thomas	TwoMorrows	Finalist	
2016	Back Issue	Michael Eury	TwoMorrows	Finalist	
2016	Comic Riffs blog	Michael Cavna	washingtonpost.com/news/comic-riffs/	Finalist	
2016	Jack Kirby Collector	John Morrow	TwoMorrows	Finalist	
2017	The A.V. Club comics coverage, including Comics Panel, Back Issues, and Big Issues	Oliver Sava et al.	www.avclub.com	Winner	
2017	Comic Riffs blog	Michael Cavna	www.washingtonpost.com/new/comic-riffs/	Finalist	
2017	Critical Chips	Zainab Akhtar	Comics & Cola	Finalist	
2017	PanelPatter.com	Rob McMonigal		Finalist	
2017	WomenWriteAboutComics.com	Megan Purdy and Claire Napier		Finalist	
2018	The Comics Journal	Dan Nadel, Timothy Hodler, and Tucker Stone	tcj.com (Fantagraphics)	Winner	
2018	Alter Ego	Roy Thomas		Finalist	
2018	Hogan's Alley	Tom Heintjes		Finalist	
2018	Jack Kirby Collector	John Morrow	TwoMorrows	Finalist	
2019	Back Issue	Michael Eury	TwoMorrows	Co-Winner	
2019	PanelxPanel magazine	Hassan Otsmane-Elhaou	panelxpanel.com	Co-Winner	
2019	The Columbus Scribbler	Brian Canini	columbusscribbler.com	Finalist	
2019	Comicosity	Aaron Long and Matt Santori	www.comicosity.com	Finalist	
2019	LAAB Magazine #0: Dark Matter	Ronald Wimberly and Josh O'Neill	Beehive Books	Finalist	
2020s
2020	WomenWriteAboutComics	Nola Pfau and Wendy Browne	www.WomenWriteAboutComics.com	Winner	
2020	Comic Riffs blog	Michael Cavna	www.washingtonpost.com/entertainment/comics/	Finalist	
2020	The Comics Journal	Gary Groth, RJ Casey, and Kristy Valenti		Finalist	
2020	Hogan's Alley	Tom Heintjes	Hogan's Alley	Finalist	
2020	Inks: The Journal of the Comics Studies Society	Qiana Whitted	Ohio State University Press	Finalist	
2020	LAAB Magazine, vol. 4: This Was Your Life	Ronald Wimberly and Josh O’Neill	Beehive Books	Finalist	
2021	WomenWriteAboutComics	Nola Pfau and Wendy Browne	www.WomenWriteAboutComics.com	Winner	
2021	Alter Ego	Roy Thomas	TwoMorrows	Finalist	
2021	Back Issue	Michael Eury	TwoMorrows	Finalist	
2021	The Comics Blog	Michael Cavna and David Betancourt	https://www.washingtonpost.com/entertainment/comics/	Finalist	
2021	The Comics Journal	RJ Casey, Kristy Valenti, and Gary Groth	Fantagraphics	Finalist	
2021	PanelxPanel magazine	Hassan Otsmane-Elhaou	PanelxPanel.com	Finalist	
2022	WomenWriteAboutComics	Nola Pfau and Wendy Browne	www.WomenWriteAboutComics.com	Winner	
2022	Alter Ego	Roy Thomas	TwoMorrows	Finalist	
2022	The Columbus Scribbler	Brian Canini, Jack Wallace, and Steve Steiner	columbusscribbler.com	Finalist	
2022	Fanbase Press	Barbra Dillon	fanbasepress.com	Finalist	
2022	tcj.com	Tucker Stone and Joe McCulloch	Fantagraphics	Finalist	
2023	PanelXPanel magazine	Hassan Otsmane-Elhaou and Tiffany Babb	panelxpanel.com	Winner	
2023	Alter Ego	Roy Thomas	TwoMorrows	Finalist	
2023	Comic Book Creator	Jon B. Cooke	TwoMorrows	Finalist	
2023	The Comics Journal #308	Gary Groth, Kristy Valenti, and Rachel Miller	Fantagraphics	Finalist	
2023	Rob Salkowitz		Forbes, ICv2, Publishers Weekly	Finalist	
2024	The Comics Journal #309	Gary Groth, Kristy Valenti, and Austin English	Fantagraphics	Winner	
2024	“The Indirect Market”	Brandon Schatz and Danica LeBlanc	comicsbeat.com	Finalist	
2024	Rob Salkowitz		Forbes, ICv2.com, Publishers Weekly	Finalist	
2024	SKTCHD	David Harper	www.sktchd.com	Finalist	
2024	SOLRAD: The Online Literary Magazine for Comics		www.solrad.co (Fieldmouse Press)	Finalist	
2025	The Beat	Heidi MacDonald and others	https://www.comicsbeat.com	Winner	
2025	ICv2: The Business of Pop Culture	Milton Griepp	icv2.com	Finalist	
2025	INKS, The Journal of the Comics Studies Society	Susan Kirtley	Ohio State University Press	Finalist	
2025	SOLRAD: The Online Literary Magazine for Comics	Daniel Elkin	www.solrad.co (Fieldmouse Press)	Finalist	
2025	Zdarsky Comics News	Allison O'Toole	Chip Zdarsky	Finalist	
2026	SKTCHD	David Harper	www.sktchd.com	Winner	
2026	CANON	Colin Blanchette and Alex Eklund		Finalist	
2026	Comic Book Creator	Jon B. Cooke	TwoMorrows	Finalist	
2026	Dummy	John Kelly	The Dummy Corporation	Finalist	
2026	Shelfdust	Steve Morris	www.shelfdust.com	Finalist	
2026	SOLRAD: The Online Literary Magazine for Comics	Daniel Elkin	www.solrad.co (Fieldmouse Press)	Finalist	
