= George Khoury (author) =

American writer

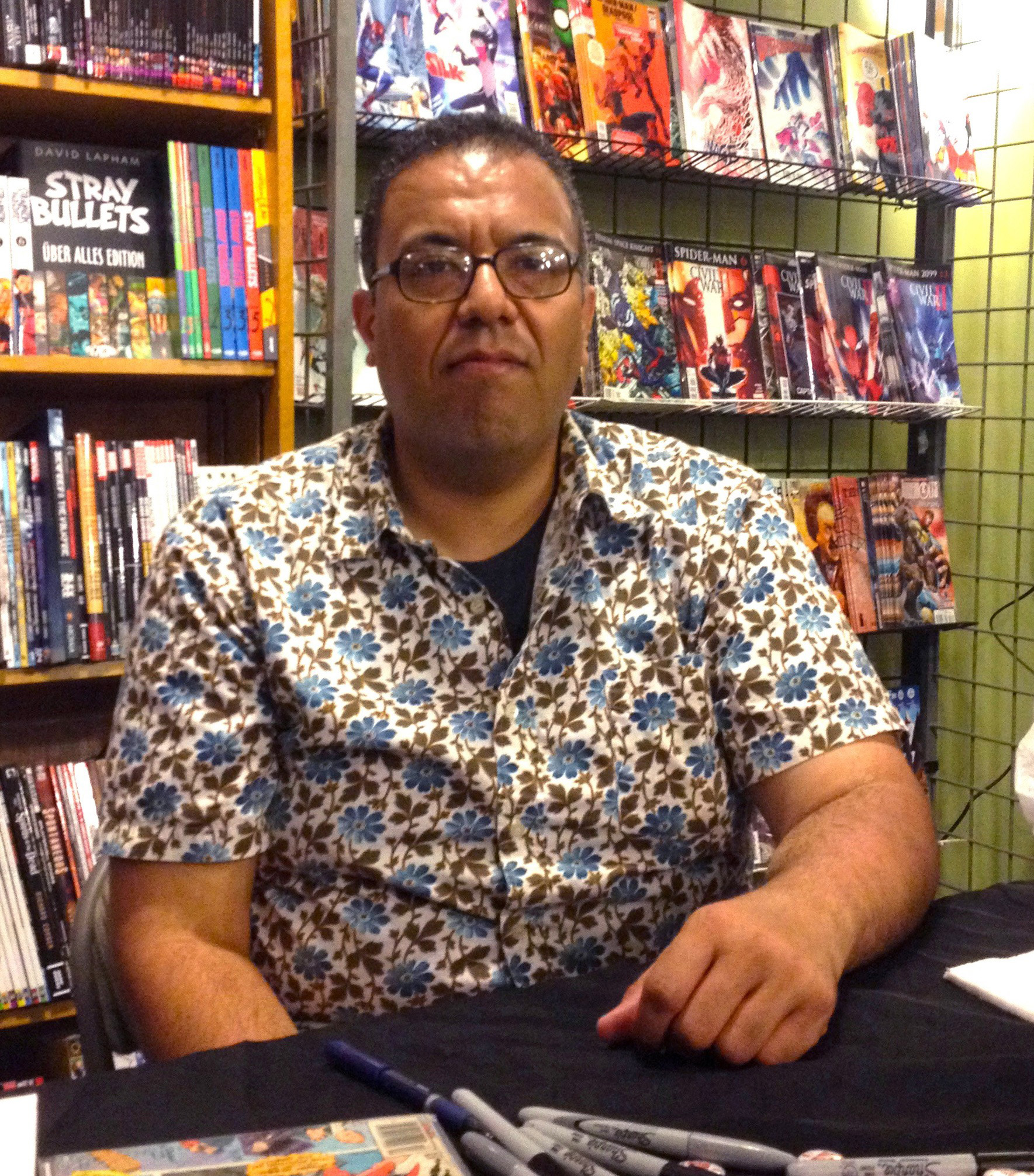
- Khoury at a signing for Comic Book Fever at JHU Comics in Manhattan
- Born: October 1971
- Occupations: Writer, interviewer, editor
- Writing career
- Subject: Comics
- Notable work: The Extraordinary Works of Alan Moore

George Khoury (/ˈkʊəri/; born October 1971) is a writer and interviewer in the field of comic books. Khoury's most notable works focus on the UK comic book writer Alan Moore. Khoury is based in New Jersey.

== Early life ==
Khoury recalls not being "completely enthralled by comic books until [he] discovered Star Wars #68 from Marvel Comics." As a 12-year-old Star Wars fan, Khoury was introduced to Marvel Comics, and

...kept coming back for more of these Marvel Comics each week... discover[ing] a goldmine of wonders: Uncanny X-Men by Chris Claremont and Paul Smith, Fantastic Four by John Byrne, Thor by Walter Simonson, Daredevil by Frank Miller and Klaus Janson, The New Defenders by J.M. DeMatteis and Don Perlin, etc... I was enchanted by the excitement-filled stories that I was getting from these Marvel epics – this was my golden age.

Khoury attended Saint Peter's College in New Jersey, where he wrote for the college paper and was a member of the Zeta Eta chapter of the Delta Sigma Pi fraternity. During his senior year, he held an unpaid late 1995 internship at Marvel Comics, with the editor Ralph Macchio and Macchio's assistant Matt Idelson.

== Career ==
Khoury's main body of work has been produced for the North Carolina–based publisher TwoMorrows Publishing. His 2001 Kimota! The Miracleman Companion was nominated for an Eisner Award in 2002. In 2003, he published The Extraordinary Works of Alan Moore and in 2004 he was the editor of True Brit: A Celebration to the Great British Comic Book Artists.

With Jason Hofius, Khoury co-wrote G-Force Animated: The Official Battle of the Planets Book and The Age of Heroes, and co-edited (with Eric Nolen-Weathington) two volumes in TwoMorrows' Modern Masters series spotlighting comics illustrators: Vol. 6: Art(hur) Adams and Vol. 10: Kevin Maguire.

In 2007, as author of the newly published Image Comics: Road to Independence, he moderated a reunion of all seven Image founders—Erik Larsen, Jim Lee, Rob Liefeld, Todd McFarlane, Whilce Portacio, Marc Silvestri and Jim Valentino—at the San Diego Comicon.

His Swampmen: Muck Monsters of the Comics, with co-author Jon B. Cooke, was published as an issue of Comic Book Creator magazine, #6, in 2014.

In 2016, he published Comic Book Fever: A Celebration of Comics: 1976-1986.

=== Magazines ===
From at least issue #21 (August 2002) of TwoMorrows' Comic Book Artist magazine, Khoury contributed articles and columns, in particular focusing on "lost" stories that were talked about, solicited or even worked on, but are unreleased. By issue #23, Khoury was described as the magazine's "new assistant editor", rising later to the position of senior editor, while continuing to write for the publication.

Khoury has also worked for other TwoMorrows' magazines, including Jack Kirby Collector, Comic Book Artist, and Rough Stuff. He is currently a contributing editor to Comic Book Creator magazine.

Khoury has also produced freelance work for publications including Creative Screenwriting, Newsarama.com, El Siglo and Comics Buyer's Guide, and contributed an interview to the book Spike Lee: Interviews (ed. Cynthia Fuchs). In January 2008, Khoury began producing an irregular weekly column for CBR.com entitled "Pop!", featuring a mixture of reminiscences, "lost stories", interviews and analysis.
