= Peter Sanderson =

American comic book critic and historian

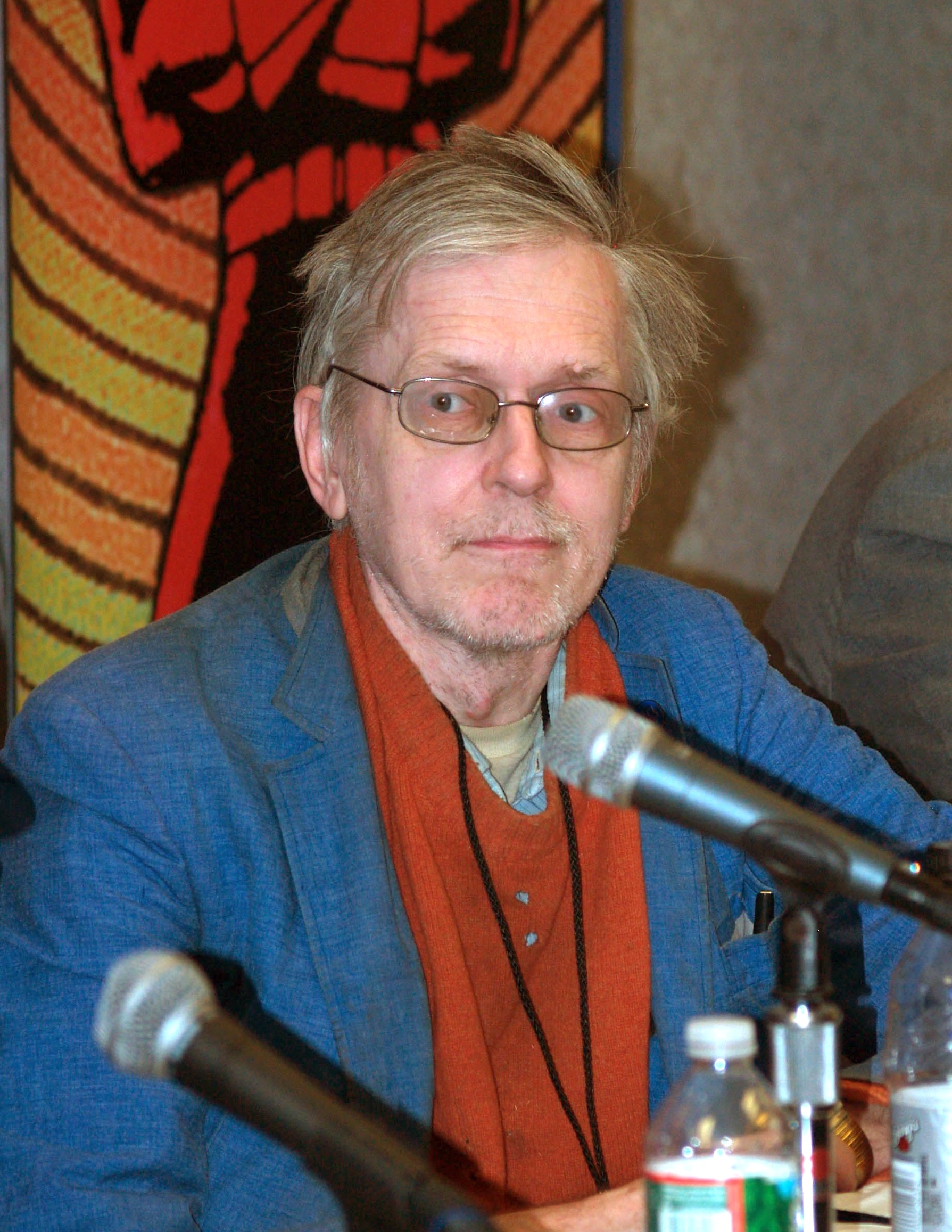
- Sanderson at the 2015 East Coast Comicon in Secaucus, New Jersey
- Born: April 25, 1952 (age 74) Milton, Massachusetts, U.S.
- Areas: Writer, historian, critic, academic
- Notable works: Marvel Saga; Official Handbook of the Marvel Universe

Peter Sanderson Jr. (born April 25, 1952) is an American comic book critic and historian.

He is best known for his work as a researcher at the two main American comics companies, DC and Marvel, where he helped to catalog the various fictional characters that comprised their respective continuities.

== Career ==
As a teenager, and later, at Columbia University, Sanderson's first involvement in the comics field was as a "letterhack," a frequent contributor to comic book letter columns. His missives impressed DC Comics editor Julius Schwartz enough for Schwartz expand the letter columns in some titles to a second, separate page (such as "Flash-Grams — Extra", "Letters To the Batcave — Extra", and "JLA Mailroom — Special Peter Sanderson Edition") to facilitate Sanderson's analysis. In the early 1980s Sanderson wrote for comics hobbyist magazines, including The Comics Journal, Amazing Heroes, and Comics Feature.

From there, Sanderson broke into the comic book industry proper. He was first hired by DC Comics, where he was given the task of reading every comic book published by the company since 1935. His research was used by Len Wein to write Who's Who in the DC Universe and by Marv Wolfman to help write Crisis on Infinite Earths. Sanderson then went to work for Marvel Comics, where he was mentored by writer/editor Mark Gruenwald as Marvel's first scholar and archivist, which saw Sanderson placed in charge of Marvel's library. Sanderson contributed as a researcher on the various Official Handbook of the Marvel Universe series in the 1980s and early 1990s.

Sanderson was also the writer of the Marvel Saga and Wolverine Saga limited series. These titles did not follow the typical art-centered comic book format. Instead, the two series were prose chronicles of the fictional histories of comic book characters, which Sanderson culled from previous titles Marvel had published over the years. The text was supplemented by individual panels excerpted from the comic books that served as Sanderson's sources.

Sanderson writes an online column entitled Comics in Context, which (in Sanderson's own words) is "a weekly series of critical essays on comics, cartoon art, and related subjects" (those "related subjects" can run the gamut from film adaptations of comic books, to other media that have been influenced by comics, such as Star Wars). The series started on July 8, 2003 on the website IGN, but then moved to the Kevin Smith-affiliated website Quick Stop Entertainment on June 23, 2006; according to Sanderson, the "Powers That Be" in charge of IGN's comics section began to tamper with the titles of his columns and complain about some of the topics he covered, whereby a "change of scenery" was necessary. After a seventeen-month hiatus, Comics in Context returned to the newly rebranded A Site Called Fred on January 19, 2010.

Outside of his online writings, Sanderson has also had a number of books published (including The Marvel Vault and The Marvel Travel Guide to New York), taught the class The Graphic Novel as Literature at New York University, curated an exhibition on Stan Lee for the Museum of Comic and Cartoon Art, and reviews the latest in comics and comics-related material for Publishers Weekly.

In April 2017, Sanderson contributed a segment of a retrospective article on his late mentor Mark Gruenwald for Back Issue! magazine #103. The segment focused on the academic and scholarly nature of Sanderson and Gruenwald's working relationship.

== Personal life ==
In April 2017 Sanderson was hospitalized with hip fracture resulting from a fall. This prevented him from writing a retrospective article on his mentor, Mark Gruenwald, that he had suggested to editor Michael Eury for the April 2018 issue of Back Issue! magazine, though he did contribute a segment for that article.

== Bibliography ==
=== Comics ===
- Marvel Saga:
  - Essential Marvel Saga: Volume 1 (440 pages, January 2008, ISBN 0-7851-2727-5)
  - Essential Marvel Saga: Volume 2 (472 pages, December 2008, ISBN 0-7851-2728-3)

=== Books ===
- Marvel Universe: The Complete Encyclopedia of Marvel's Greatest Characters (256 pages, Harry N. Abrams, 1998, ISBN 0-8109-8171-8)
- Ultimate X-Men (Dorling Kindersley, 174 pages, 2000, ISBN 0-7513-2885-5, revised second edition, X-Men: The Ultimate Guide, 192 pages, 2003, ISBN 0-7513-4617-9)
- Classic Marvel Super Heroes: The Story of Marvel's Mightiest (128 pages, Becker & Mayer Books, 2005, paperback, ISBN 1-932855-56-4, hardcover, ISBN 1-932855-32-7)

=== Essays ===
- "The Ideal and the Strange: Order Vs. Freedom in Planetary". Keeping the World Strange: A Planetary Guide. Sequart Research & Literacy Organization, 2011. ISBN 978-0-578-07701-7.
- "The 1960s Batman TV Series from Comics to Screen". Gotham City 14 Miles: 14 Essays on Why the 1960s Batman TV Series Matters. Sequart Research & Literacy Organization, 2010. ISBN 978-0-578-06461-1.
- "Bringing Light to the World: Watchmen from Hiroshima to Manhattan". Minutes to Midnight: Twelve Essays on Watchmen. Sequart Research & Literacy Organization, 2010. ISBN 978-0-578-06076-7.
