= The Extraordinary Works of Alan Moore =

Book written by George Khoury

The Extraordinary Works of Alan Moore is a book written by George Khoury, published by TwoMorrows Publishing in 2003. An updated "Indispensable Edition" was released in 2009.

== Contents ==
The book contains a long interview of Alan Moore about his life and comics career. It includes tributes by Neil Gaiman and Mark Buckingham, Rick Veitch, David Lloyd, John Totleben, Dave Gibbons, Brian Bolland, J. H. Williams III, Ian Gibson, Garry Leach, Hilary Barta, Chris Sprouse, Scott Dunbier, Sam Kieth, Todd Klein, and Kevin O'Neill. There is an extensive bibliography.

It contains the following full works by Moore:

- "Shrine of the Lizard" (a prose story reprinted from the 1971 fanzine Weird Window #2)
- Three strips from Roscoe Moscow
- Five strips of Maxwell the Magic Cat
- "Nutters Ruin" (a 1979 strip, reprinted from Speakeasy #43)
- "The Avenging Hunchback" (reprinted from Darkstar #19)
- "Kultural Krime Komix" (reprinted from Darkstar #20)
- "Old Gangsters Never Die" (a short comic adaptation of the song included with the 45-rpm record with art by Lloyd Thatcher)
- A never realised Judge Dredd script
- The Halo Jones page from 2000 A.D. #500
- "Lust" (reprinted from Seven Deadly Sins)
- A one-page strip reprinted from Heartbreak Hotel #1
- "Dr. Omaha presents Venus in Fur" (reprinted from Images of Omaha #2)
- "Bob Wachsman Tummler" (reprinted from American Splendor #15)
- "Belly of Cloud" (never realised script)
- "I Can Hear the Grass Grow" (reprinted from Heartbreak Hotel #3)
- "In Pictopia" (recolored by José Villarrubia and reprinted from Anything Goes #2)
- The 2009 "Indispensable Edition" replaces "In Pictopia" with the story "The Riddle of the Recalcitrant Refuse" from Mr. Monster #3

== Publication ==
- The Extraordinary Works of Alan Moore (by George Khoury, 224 pages, TwoMorrows Publishing, 2003, ISBN 978-1-893905-24-5)
- The Extraordinary Works of Alan Moore - Indispensable Edition (by George Khoury, 240 pages, TwoMorrows Publishing, 2009, ISBN 978-1-60549-009-0)

== See also ==
- List of published material by Alan Moore
