= Mark Arnold (historian) =

American writer & commentator (born 1966)

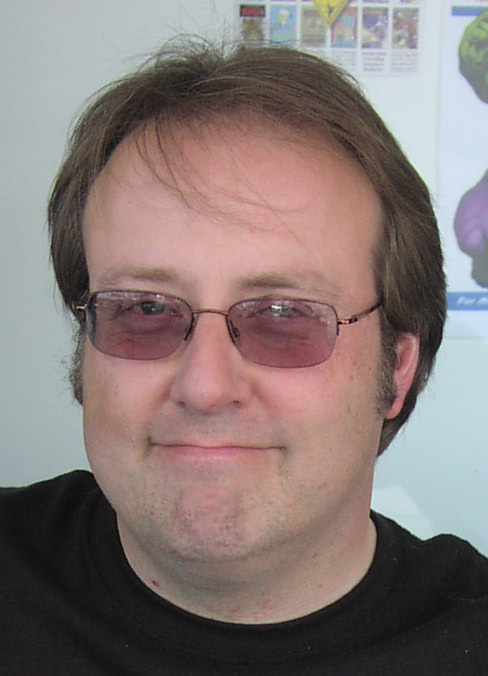
- Mark Arnold
- Born: December 15, 1966 (age 59); San Jose, California, U.S.

Mark Arnold (born December 15, 1966) is an American writer and commentator who grew up in Saratoga, California. He has contributed to several publications in the United States, including The Comics Journal, Hogan's Alley, Back Issue!, and Comics Buyer's Guide. Arnold also worked with Jerry Beck and Leslie Cabarga on their Harvey Comics Classics series for Dark Horse Comics.

Arnold has a BA degree in Broadcast Communication Arts from San Francisco State University, and has studied art through Art Instruction Schools. He currently resides in Springfield, Oregon.

== Books ==
Arnold has written numerous books about comic books, animation and music. The first, The Best of The Harveyville Fun Times!, focused on the comic book publisher Harvey Comics. The second was Created and Produced by Total TeleVision productions: The Story of Underdog, Tennessee Tuxedo and the Rest. If You're Cracked, You're Happy: The History of Cracked Mazagine, a two-volume set followed in 2011. Next, Arnold wrote Mark Arnold Picks On The Beatles and Frozen in Ice: The Story of Walt Disney Productions 1966-1985.

== Art shows ==
Arnold also compiled the traveling original art show titled "From Richie Rich to Wendy the Witch: The Art of Harvey Comics" which debuted in June 2008 at San Francisco's Cartoon Art Museum, moving to New York City's Museum of Comic and Cartoon Art in December 2008 and traveling again to Pittsburgh, Pennsylvania, in May 2009. The show ended at Van Eaton Galleries in Sherman Oaks, California in May 2010.

Arnold compiled another original art show titled "70 Years of Archie Comics" which debuted in July 2011 again at San Francisco's Cartoon Art Museum and ran through December 2011.

In 2012, a third art show titled "What Me, Worry? 60 Years of Mad" debuted on April 20 at the museum.

Arnold also contributed to "Aliens, Monsters, and Madmen: The Art of EC Comics", an art show presented at the University of Oregon's Jordan Schnitzer Museum of Art from May 14 to July 16, 2016. Besides his exhibit contributions, Arnold gave a talk on Harvey Kurtzman and Mad magazine at the museum on June 29, 2016.

== Contributions to DVD releases ==
Arnold recorded audio commentaries and video narration for the following DVD releases through Shout! Factory: "Casper the Friendly Ghost: The Complete Collection (1945-1963)", "Underdog: The Complete Series" and "Tennessee Tuxedo And His Tales: Complete Collection" released in 2011 and 2012.

From 2016 to 2020, Arnold contributed commentaries and onscreen documentary appearances for Kino Lorber's DePatie-Freleng Animated Film Collection including The Inspector, Roland and Rattfink, The Ant and the Aardvark, The Tijuana Toads, The Blue Racer, Hoot Kloot, The Dogfather, Misterjaw, Crazylegs Crane, and six volumes of The Pink Panther. The cartoons were issued on DVD and Blu-ray.

== The Geek Speak Show and Fun Ideas Podcast ==
Arnold debuted his segment called "The Stories Behind the Stories" on "The Geek Speak Show", on September 5, 2012. The segment features interviews with past, present and up-and-coming people in the comic book and animation industry. Multiple episodes of "The Stories Behind the Stories" have been made available via a YouTube channel.

After 19 episodes, Arnold went on to create and host his own podcast called "Fun Ideas Podcast", which premiered on September 12, 2018. Arnold features guests from the comic book, animation, TV, movie and music industries. There have been over 300 episodes as of 2026.

== Bibliography ==
- Arnold, Mark (2006). The Best of The Harveyville Fun Times!. Lulu.com. ISBN 9781847283689.
- Arnold, Mark (2009). Created and Produced by Total TeleVision productions: The Story of Underdog, Tennessee Tuxedo and the Rest. BearManor Media. ISBN 9781593933456.
- Arnold, Mark (2011). If You're Cracked, You're Happy: The Cracked Mazagine Story, Part Won. BearManor Media. ISBN 9781593936440.
- Arnold, Mark (2011). If You're Cracked, You're Happy: The Cracked Mazagine Story, Part Too. BearManor Media. ISBN 9781593936457.
- Arnold, Mark (2011). Mark Arnold Picks On The Beatles. Lulu.com. ISBN 9781257644544.
- Arnold, Mark (2013). Frozen in Ice: The Story of Walt Disney Productions 1966-1985. BearManor Media. ISBN 9781593937515.
- Arnold, Mark (2015). Think Pink! The DePatie-Freleng Story. BearManor Media. ISBN 9781593931698.
- Arnold, Mark (2017). Pocket Full of Dennis the Menace. BearManor Media. ISBN 9781629331188.
- Arnold, Mark (2017). The Harvey Comics Companion. BearManor Media. ISBN 9781629331737.
- Arnold, Mark (2017). Long Title: Looking for the Good Times; Examining the Monkees' Songs, One by One. BearManor Media. ISBN 9781629331751.
- Arnold, Mark (2019). Aaaaalllvvviiinnn!!!: The Story of Ross Bagdasarian, Sr., Liberty Records, Format Films and The Alvin Show. BearManor Media. ISBN 9781629334325.
- Arnold, Mark (2020). Headquartered: A Timeline of The Monkees Solo Years. BearManor Media. ISBN 9781629335346.
- Arnold, Mark (2021). TTV Scrapbook. BearManor Media. ISBN 9781629337784.
- Arnold, Mark (2022). Pac-Man: The First Animated TV Show Based Upon a Video Game. BearManor Media. ISBN 9781629339375.
- Arnold, Mark (2022). Stars of Walt Disney Productions. BearManor Media. ISBN 9798887710723.
- Arnold, Mark (2024). Not Just Happy Together: The Turtles A to Z )(AM Radio to Zappa). Genius Book Publishing. ISBN 9781958727225.
- Arnold, Mark (2024). Unconditionally MAD, Part 1. BearManor Media. ISBN 9798887714097.
- Arnold, Mark (2024). Unconditionally MAD, Part B. BearManor Media. ISBN 9798887714110.
- Arnold, Mark (2024). Crazy: The Magazine That Dared to Be Dumb. BearManor Media. ISBN 9798887715797.
- Arnold, Mark (2026). Plop!: The Strangest Humor Magazine. BearManor Media. ISBN 9798887719863.
- Arnold, Mark (2026). The Monkees Comic Book Book. Genius Book Publishing. ISBN 9781970450187.

== As contributor ==
- Feldman, David, ed. (2005). Do Elephants Jump? (Imponderables Books). New York, NY: William Morrow Paperbacks. ISBN 978-0-06053-914-6.
- Cabarga, Leslie, ed. (2007). Harvey Comics Classics Volume One: Casper the Friendly Ghost. Introduction by Jerry Beck. Milwaukie, Oregon: Dark Horse Books. ISBN 978-1-59307-781-5.
- Cabarga, Leslie, ed. (2007). Harvey Comics Classics Volume Two: Richie Rich the Poor Little Rich Boy. Introduction by Jerry Beck. Milwaukie, Oregon: Dark Horse Books. ISBN 978-1-59307-848-5.
- Cabarga, Leslie, ed. (2008). Harvey Comics Classics Volume Three: Hot Stuff the Little Devil. Introduction by Jerry Beck. Milwaukie, Oregon: Dark Horse Books. ISBN 978-1-59307-914-7.
- Cabarga, Leslie, ed. (2008). Harvey Comics Classics Volume Four: Baby Huey the Baby Giant. Introduction by Jerry Beck. Milwaukie, Oregon: Dark Horse Books. ISBN 978-1-59307-977-2.
- Cabarga, Leslie, ed. (2009). Harvey Comics Classics Volume Five: The Harvey Girls Little Audrey, Little Dot & Little Lotta. Introduction by Jerry Beck. Milwaukie, Oregon: Dark Horse Books. ISBN 978-1-59582-171-3.
- Cabarga, Leslie, ed. (2009). Casper The Friendly Ghost 60th Anniversary Special. Milwaukie, Oregon: Dark Horse Books. ISBN 978-1-59582-467-7.
- Yoe, Craig (2011). Archie: A Celebration of America's Favorite Teenagers. IDW Yoe Books. ISBN 978-1-60010-754-2.
- Todd, Mort (2019). The Comedy of Jack Davis. Comicfix. ISBN 978-1-69900-583-5.
- Todd, Mort (2019). The Comedy of John Severin. Comicfix. ISBN 978-1-69898-780-4.
- Tuppan, Lothar (2026). Fear USA: An Anthology of HIdden Terrors. Screaming Eye Press. ISBN 9798185478530.
