= Back Issue! =

American magazine

- Issue #1 (November 2003). Art by George Pérez.
- Editor: Michael Eury
- Categories: Comics historiography, comics criticism
- Frequency: Eight times annually
- Publisher: TwoMorrows Publishing
- First issue: November 2003
- Country: United States
- Based in: Raleigh, North Carolina
- Language: English
- Website: TwoMorrows.com

Back Issue! is an American magazine published by TwoMorrows Publishing, based in Raleigh, North Carolina. Founded in 2003 and published eight times yearly, it features articles and art about comic books from the 1970s to the present.

Edited by former comics writer and editor Michael Eury, the magazine was conceived as a replacement for Comic Book Artist, which editor and owner Jon B. Cooke had taken from TwoMorrows to a different publishing house in 2002.

Writers for the series include Mark Arnold, Michael Aushenker, Glenn Greenberg, George Khoury, Andy Mangels, and Richard A. Scott.

Back Issue! was a shared winner of the 2019 Eisner Award for Best Comics-Related Periodical/Journalism with PanelxPanel.
