= SpaceNews =

American magazine and website

- Screenshot of the website in December 2024
- Type: Publication (news)
- Owner(s): Pocket Ventures, LLC.
- Editor-in-chief: Brian Berger
- Founded: 1989
- Language: English
- Headquarters: Alexandria, Virginia
- Country: USA
- ISSN: 1046-6940
- Website: spacenews.com

SpaceNews is a print and digital publication that covers business and political news in the space and satellite industry. SpaceNews provides news, commentary and analysis to an audience of government officials, politicians and executives within the space industry. SpaceNews details topics in civil, military and space and the satellite communications business.

SpaceNews covers important news in North America, Europe, Asia, Africa, the Middle East and South America from NASA, the European Space Agency, and private spaceflight firms such as Arianespace, International Launch Services, SpaceX and United Launch Alliance. The magazine regularly features profiles on relevant and important figures within the space industry. These profiles have featured numerous government leaders, corporate executives and other knowledgeable space experts, including NASA administrators Richard Truly, Daniel Goldin, Sean O’Keefe, Michael Griffin and Charles Boldin.

Founded in 1989, SpaceNews publishes its flagship magazine 12 times per year. Brian Berger, a journalist who joined SpaceNews in 1998 to cover NASA and reusable launch vehicles, was named editor-in-chief in January 2016.

SpaceNews produces and publishes several electronic newsletters, including First Up, First Up Satcom, SN Military.Space and SpaceNews This Week.

SpaceNews produces the official show daily of the Space Symposium, a civil, military and commercial space conference the Space Foundation holds annually in Colorado Springs, Colorado. The show daily is a tabloid-size print publication distributed to attendees during the conference. In 2018, SpaceNews began producing a print show daily for AIAA and Utah State University's Conference on Small Satellites, held each August on the campus of Utah State University in Logan, Utah.

SpaceNews was originally owned by the Army Times Publishing Company, which was acquired by Gannett in 1997. In 2000, Space.com (later renamed Imaginova) acquired SpaceNews from Gannett. SpaceNews is currently owned by Pocket Ventures, LLC., which acquired the publication from Imaginova in June 2012.
