= Marvel Saga =

1985–1987 comic book series

- First Issue Cover

Publication information
- Publisher: Marvel Comics
- Schedule: Monthly
- Format: Limited series
- Publication date: December 1985 – December 1987
- No. of issues: 25

Creative team
- Written by: Peter Sanderson
- Artist: Various
- Editor: Danny Fingeroth

Collected editions
- Volume 1: ISBN 978-0-7851-2727-7
- Volume 2: ISBN 978-0-7851-2728-4

The Marvel Saga: The Official History of the Marvel Universe was a comic book series which attempted to condense the first 25 years of Marvel Universe events into a sequential, narrative story.

== Publication history ==
The series was researched and written by Peter Sanderson and edited by Danny Fingeroth. It was published over 25 issues from December 1985 to December 1987. The story follows Marvel continuity as closely as possible from the inception of the Marvel Universe, and it is stated in the first issue that there is nothing in the series that hasn't already been printed in previous Marvel comics. The illustration of the comics was mostly made up from excerpts from the original comics in which the events being described took place, with the addition of some new artwork to describe some of the events mentioned.

The series was meant to be a cohesive and quick way for newcomers to catch up on the entirety of the Marvel Universe at once, featuring the stories of the biggest and most important events in the Universe, including origins of most of the major Marvel characters. It also allows readers to see how stories from many different series are related and how they fit together in chronological order. The series concluded with the introduction of Galactus and the Silver Surfer.

In order to tie in with the wedding of Peter Parker and Mary Jane Watson, Marvel Saga #22 broke from the chronological approach of the series to provide a complete history of Peter and Mary Jane's relationship, and was written by Peter Parker, the Spectacular Spider-Man writer Peter David instead of Sanderson. David commented, "How could I not do it? I'm an old romantic. Having been happily married for ten years, I'm a fan of 'And they got married and lived happily ever after.' I think Peter deserves some happiness, although considering the Parker luck, he probably won't live happily ever after." [emphases in original]

== Spin-offs ==
Subsequent releases from Marvel have followed the Marvel Saga format. Wolverine Saga, a four-part mini-series published from September 1989 to December 1989, detailed the history of Wolverine up to that time. Spider-Man Saga, another four issue series, was released from November 1991 to February 1992 and did the same thing for Spider-Man.

Beginning in 2006, Marvel released several Marvel Saga-style one-shots for their titles. The list of these books are:

- Astonishing X-Men Saga (March 2006)
- Saga of Squadron Supreme (April 2006)
- Skrull Kill Krew Saga* (2006)
- Runaways Saga (May 2007)
- Annihilation Saga (July 2007)
- Ultimates Saga (December 2007)
- Ghost Rider Saga* (May 2008)
- Secret Invasion Saga (May 2008)
- Hulk Saga* (June 2008)
- Deadpool Saga* (July 2008)
- Daredevil By Ed Brubaker Saga (December 2008)
- Marvel: Your Universe Saga (October 2008)
- X-Infernus Saga* (October 2008)
- Franklin Richards Saga* (November 2008)
- Black Panther Saga* (December 2008)
- March on Ultimatum Saga (December 2008)
- Punisher Saga* (December 2008)
- War of Kings Saga (February 2009)
- Exiles Saga* (March 2009)
- Wolverine Saga (May 2009)
- New Mutants Saga (June 2009)
- Spider-Woman Saga* (August 2009)
- Moon Knight Saga (November 2009)
- Black Widow Saga* (March 2010)
- X-Factor Forever Saga* (March 2010)
- Amazing Spider-Man: Grim Hunt - The Kraven Saga (May 2010)
- X-Men: Curse of the Mutants Saga (August 2010)
- All-New Wolverine Saga (October 2010)
- Spider-Man Saga (December 2010)
- Iron Man 2.0 Saga* (March 2011)
- The Mighty Thor Saga (June 2011)

* Online only

In January 2012, Marvel published a one-shot comic titled History of the Marvel Universe, which provided an overview of the past 50 years of Marvel history in the Marvel Saga format.

== Collected editions ==
The series has been collected into two trade paperbacks:

- Essential Marvel:
  - Marvel Saga Vol. 1 (collects Marvel Saga #1-12, 448 pages, January 2008, ISBN 978-0-7851-2727-7)
  - Marvel Saga vol. 2 (collects Marvel Saga #13-25, 480 pages, December 2008, ISBN 978-0-7851-2728-4)
