= Heidi MacDonald =

Writer and editor in the field of comic books

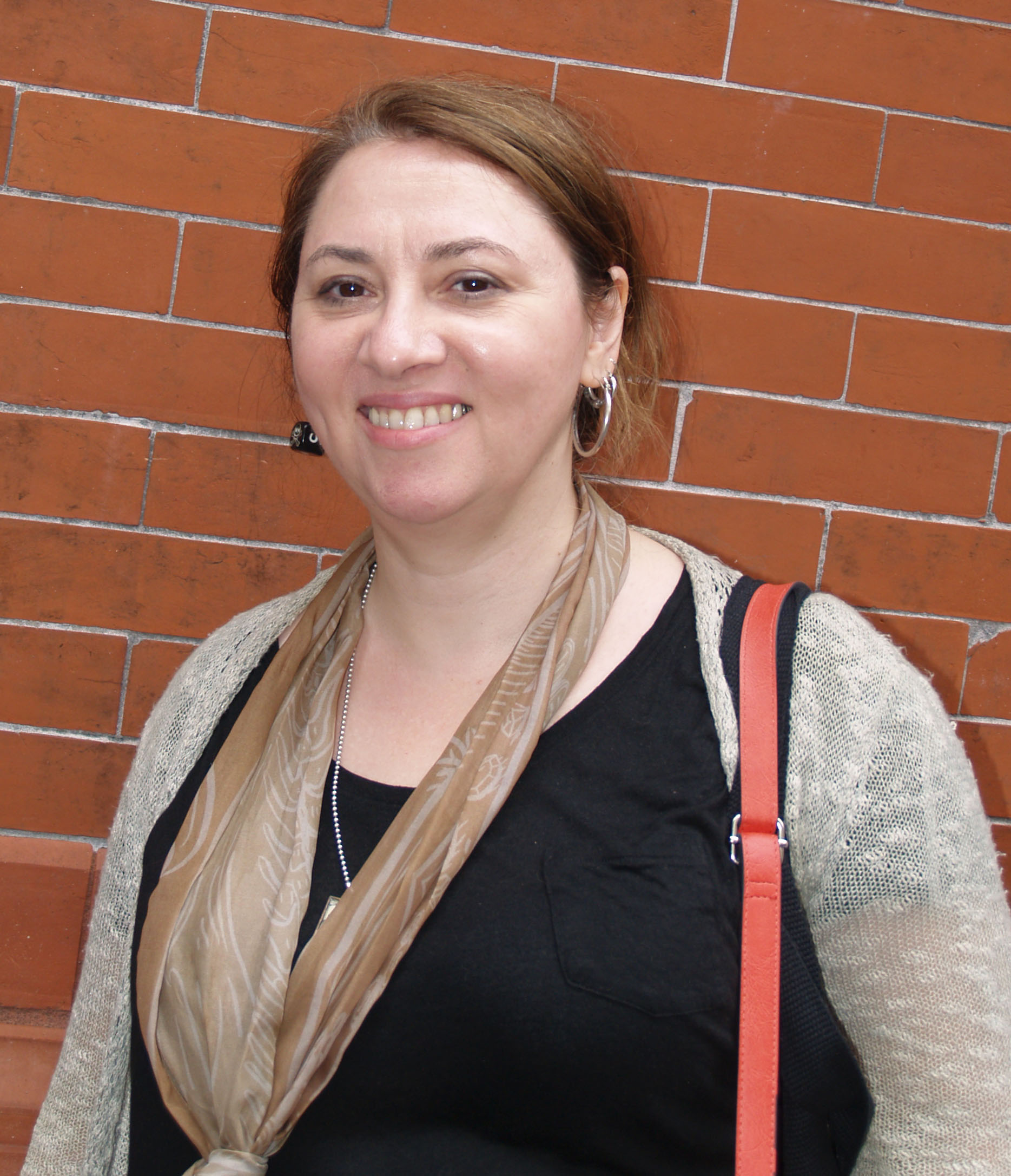
- MacDonald at the 2014; Brooklyn Book Festival
- Occupations: Critic, writer
- Notable credit: The Beat
- Awards: Friends of Lulu Women of Distinction Award (2005) Eisner Award for Best Comics-Related Periodical/Journalism (2025)
- Website: comicsbeat.com

MacDonald discussing the career of Trina Robbins in 2016

Heidi MacDonald (born November 15, 1961) is an American writer and editor of comic books based in New York City. She runs the comics industry news blog The Beat.

== Career ==
MacDonald is a former editor for DC Comics' Vertigo imprint and Disney Adventures.

In 1993, she was one of the founders of Friends of Lulu, an advocacy organization designed to promote readership of comic books by women and the participation of women in the comic book industry. (One of the organization's other founders, Trina Robbins, described MacDonald as "the founding mommy" of Friends of Lulu.) In 2005, MacDonald was given the Women of Distinction Award by Friends of Lulu.

In 2007, MacDonald edited the graphic novel The Hills Have Eyes: The Beginning from Fox Atomic Comics, that was a prequel to the 2006 film.

From about 2006 to 2010, MacDonald also was an editor and writer at Publishers Weekly, where she co-wrote PW Comics Week. In January 2016, MacDonald announced she was laid off from her position at Publishers Weekly, although she would continue to write for the magazine on a freelance basis.

=== The Beat ===
MacDonald created her long-running blog The Beat: The News Blog of Comics Culture (also known as Comics Beat) at Comicon.com in June 2004, before moving it to Publishers Weekly in 2006, and to an independent site in 2010. In 2016, she announced she was moving The Beat to the webcomics site Hiveworks. She wrote, "The era of the 'bedroom blogger' is long gone, replaced by corporate entities trying to outdo each other with clickbait headlines and subsisting on popup ads that get more bewildering every day."

In 2017, comics publisher Lion Forge acquired The Beat. In January 2020, it was announced that after Lion Forge was acquired by Polarity, the company cut ties with MacDonald. In a press release, MacDonald indicated she would continue the blog independently.

In 2025, The Beat won the Eisner Award for "Best Comics-Related Periodical/Journalism", presented at San Diego Comic-Con.
