= Newsarama =

Former American website based around comic books

- Screenshot of the website in December 2024
- Website type: Comic book
- Available in: English
- Dissolved: June 2020 (end of separate website); April 2026 (end of separate editorial)
- Successor: GamesRadar+
- Owners: Future US (prior: Imaginova, Purch Group)
- Creators: Matt Brady, Mike Doran
- Website: www.gamesradar.com/newsarama/
- Registration: Yes
- Launched: August 2002
- Current status: Online

Newsarama is the brand of a section within the media news website GamesRadar+ with content about American comic book media franchises. Prior to June 2020, it was a standalone American website that published news, interviews, and essays about the American comic book industry. In June 2020, Future US, owner of both Newsarama and GamesRadar+, merged the former into the latter. As of April 2026, Newsarama was described as "seemingly defunct".

== History ==
=== Message board column (1995–1997) ===
Newsarama began in mid-1995 as a series of Internet forum postings on the Prodigy comic book message boards by fan Mike Doran. In the forum postings, Doran shared comic book-related news items he had found across the World Wide Web and, as these postings became more regular and read widely, he gave them the title "Prodigy Comic Book Newswire."

In January 1997, Doran began to post a version of the column titled The Comics Newswire on Usenet's various rec.arts.comics communities. The name of the column evolved to The Newswire, and then to CBI Newsarama, before finally becoming Newsarama in 1998, with the help of co-creator Matt Brady. That year, Doran broke the news of Jim Lee's sale of WildStorm to DC Comics, solidifying Newsarama as a major source for industry news.

Newsarama became one of the first online news sources for the comic book industry, allowing it to gain popularity when it could break stories faster than other comic book news sources that appeared in printed publications. Although the column in its earliest forms reported both news and rumors, it later adopted a more journalistic news approach.

=== Newsarama column and standalone site (1998–2006) ===
Doran's postings left Usenet in 1998, becoming a Newsarama column on such websites as Mania.com, AnotherUniverse.com, Fandom.com and Comicon.com.

In August 2002, the Newsarama column became a semi-autonomous site, hosted by Kevin Smith's ViewAskew.com network of sites. Three months later, Doran left Newsarama to take a staff position at Marvel Comics. Brady took over writing for the site.

Doran later returned to work at Newsarama, while Brady continued working as primary writer for the site. The site left the ViewAskew.com network and became independent in early April 2006. That same year, the site absorbed The Great Curve blog to create Blog@Newsarama.

=== Life as a subsidiary (2007–2019) ===
Newsarama was acquired by Imaginova in October 2007. The writers soon became unhappy with the new owners when Imaginova relaunched the website without notifying the staff. When a promised raise fell through, those who contributed to Blog@Newsarama quit en masse in November 2008. A new team of contributors were brought on a month later. Brady left the site in July 2009, leaving Doran and Lucas Siegel to run the site, with Siegel taking the position of Site Editor.

In October 2009, TopTenREVIEWS acquired Newsarama, alongside Space.com and Live Science. After the acquisition, TopTenREVIEWS rebranded to TechMedia Network. In April 2014, the company changed its name again to Purch Group.

Newsarama has been quoted as a source of comic news by the mainstream media, including The New York Times. In 2006, Entertainment Weekly listed Newsarama as one of its "25 favorite online entertainment sites" in 2006 and as one of its "100 Greatest Websites" in 2007.

Newsarama originally maintained a registered member forum known as talk@Newsarama. In 2010, Newsarama closed down the forum and redirected readers to comment on the site's Facebook page. In 2013, Blog@Newsarama was discontinued after Graeme McMillan moved to The Hollywood Reporter.

Purch's consumer brands, including Newsarama, were acquired by Future US in July 2018.

=== End of standalone website (2020–present) ===
In June 2020, Newsarama stopped being a standalone site and became part of the GamesRadar+ website, another brand owned by Future US. During the transition, most of the website's archives were erased. In February 2022, long-time contributor and editor Chris Arrant left to become editor-in-chief of ReedPOP. Graeme McMillan, for Popverse, reported that initially the status quo for Newsarama as part of GamesRadar+ allowed "Doran and his two-person team" to focus "more exclusively on comics". However, Newsarama editor Samantha Puc was laid off in November 2022, "reducing the team to Doran and long-time staff writer George Marston". On February 2, 2023, it was announced that Doran had left Newsarama and GamesRadar+. In April 2023, Will Salmon became the comics editor.

In February 2025, Newsarama's team was reduced to just Marston, with Salmon moved to the streaming vertical. Subsequently, in April 2026, Marston was laid off. Arrant, now for Popverse, described Newsarama as "seemingly defunct". He explained that over the last 12 months, "the Newsarama branding on the GamesRadar.com website was largely eliminated, with the comics coverage remaining left as a secondary vertical and writing efforts minimized to focus primarily on games, film, & TV related to comics". Arrant also noted that Marston was a member of the Future plc union and in the past several months, multiple Future union writers and editors have been laid off, "with their positions either eliminated or replaced by non-union workers living in Future plc's home base of England".

== Columnists ==
Marvel Comics editor-in-chief Joe Quesada's column "Joe Fridays" (renamed "New Joe Fridays" in 2006 as a joke regarding Marvel's penchant for relaunching titles with the prefix "new") appeared weekly until 2008, when the column moved to MySpace as "My Cup O' Joe." Spider-Man editor Stephen Wacker contributed to the "Weekly Webbing" Q&A column.

Quesada then began writing the column "Cup of Joe" on Comic Book Resources when MySpace shut down its comic book division in 2009. Former DC Comics editor Michael Siglain contributed the weekly "5.2 About 52" Q&A column covering the weekly comic book series 52. DC Executive Editor Dan DiDio participated in a bi-weekly Q&A column, as well as a weekly column focusing on Countdown.

Regular columns have included "Animated Shorts" by Steve Fritz, "Write or Wrong" by Dirk Manning, "Agent of S.T.Y.L.E." by Alan Kistler, covering the evolution of costumes and designs for different comic book characters, and "Best Shots" by reviewers from ShotgunReviews.com. Troy Brownfield contributed multiple columns, including "Right to Assemble", covering Marvel's Avengers titles, "Column . . . for JUSTICE," covering Justice League titles, "Getting Animated," and "Friday Flashback."

Newsarama has also run a series of "Post Game" columns offering coverage and commentary of popular genre-related television programs on a regular basis. Covered shows include Lost, Smallville, Batman: The Brave and the Bold, Fringe, Flash Forward, and others.

== Criticism ==
In November 2005, Michael Dean, writing in The Comics Journal, studied Internet comic book industry news sources and evaluated Newsarama's journalistic performance. The study praised the site for the depth of coverage provided in some articles, but criticized its reliance on press releases and the "softness" of the questions asked in its interviews. Dean focused on one story in particular, "Diamond Changes Thresholds" by Matt Brady. Though he found the piece qualified as "journalism", Dean also found it: "contained factual inaccuracies, failed to get multiple points of view and sucked up to its corporate subject".

At WonderCon 2008, Bill Willingham revealed information about his Fables comic book series that he asked journalists not to report on. Graeme McMillan, representing Newsarama, agreed to leave the information out of his transcript, leading fans to criticize the website's reporting.

== Awards ==
The site has been the recipient of a number of awards and award nominations, including:

- 1999 Eagle Award nomination for Favorite Comics-Related Website (professional).
- 2000 Eagle Award nomination for Favourite Comics-Related Website (professional).
- 2004 Eagle Award for Favorite Comics E-Zine.
- 2005 Eagle Award nomination for Favourite Comics-Related Website.
- 2006 Eagle Award for Favorite Comics-Related Website.
- 2007 Eagle Award nomination for Favorite Comics Related Website.
- 2008 Eisner Award for Best Comics-Related Periodical/Journalism.
- 2019 Tripwire Award nomination for Best Comics-related Website/Publication.
- 2020 Tripwire Award for Best Comics-related Website/Publication.
- 2021 Tripwire Award nomination for Best Comics-Related Website/Publications.
- 2022 Tripwire Award nomination for Best Comics-Related Website/Publications.
