= Alter Ego (magazine) =

American magazine devoted to Golden Age and Silver Age Comic Books

- Alter Ego #99 (January 2011)
- Editor: Roy Thomas
- Frequency: Bimonthly
- Founded: 1961
- Company: TwoMorrows Publishing
- Country: United States
- Based in: Raleigh, NC
- Language: English

Alter Ego is an American magazine devoted to comic books and comic-book creators of the 1930s to late-1960s periods comprising what fans and historians call the Golden Age and Silver Age of Comic Books.

It was founded as a fanzine by Jerry Bails in 1961, and later taken over by Roy Thomas. 10 issues were released through 1969, with issue #11 following nine years later. In 1999, following a five-issue run the previous years as a flip-book with Comic Book Artist, Alter Ego began regular bimonthly publication as a formal magazine with glossy covers. TwoMorrows Publishing is the owner of the magazine and it is headquartered in Raleigh, NC.

== Volume 1 ==
Alter Ego #1 (1961). Cover art by Roy Thomas.

Alter-Ego supported the superhero revivals of the era that Jerry Bails dubbed "The Second Heroic Age of Comics", popularly known as the Silver Age of Comic Books. DC Comics editor Julius Schwartz encouraged Bails and collaborator Roy Thomas, who would eventually become Marvel Comics editor-in-chief.

Bails contacted readers whose letters had appeared in DC's The Brave and the Bold #35, the first comic book to print readers' full mailing addresses in its letter column. Some of those readers were active in other fandoms, and helped spread word-of-mouth about Alter Ego. Schwartz loaned Bails his copies of the comics and science fiction fanzine Xero, and Bails wrote to everyone in their letter column as well. Soon, Bails was receiving two or three responses daily from people interested in subscribing.

The first issue of Alter Ego appeared in March 1961. Bails' wife Sondra typed out the contents, and the lettering was done with plastic lettering guides. The 22-page issue featured three JSA-related articles, two columns, and an amateur comic strip:

- A cover featuring the "Bestest League of America", a Roy Thomas parody of the Justice League of America
- The editorial "A Matter of Policy"
- "On the Drawing Board" — Four pages of news, including advance word of the forthcoming "Flash of Two Worlds" story (Flash #123), previews of the upcoming Batman and Secret Origins Annuals, and hints of the Atom revival slated for Showcase #34
- "The Wiles of the Wizard, Portrait of a Villain"
- "Reincarnation of the Spectre" — Thomas' proposal for a new version of the Spectre, as a man divided into two characters representing good and evil, ego and id: the Spectre and Count Dis.
- "Merciful Minerva: The Story of Wonder Woman"
- "The Bestest League of America" — The first chapter of Thomas' Justice League of America parody.

Alter Ego also sponsored the Alley Awards, a series of comic book awards that lasted until the end of the 1960s. By the awards' third year, the number of ballots received had become so overwhelming that Bails called for a fan get-together at which votes could be tabulated by group effort. This gathering of Midwestern fans, held in March 1964 at Bails' Detroit, Michigan-area home of Bails, was dubbed the "Alley Tally", and its success provided inspiration for the organizing of comic book conventions that began soon afterward.

The original run of Alter Ego lasted 11 issues, spread over 17 years. 10 issues were released between 1961 and 1969, with issue #11 following nine years later, in 1978. Bails edited and published the first four issues before turning it over to fan-artist Ronn Foss (and, initially, Foss' wife Myra and his friend Grass Green) who edited issues #5-6. Thomas edited a further four issues, and issue #11 almost a decade later in collaboration with Mike Friedrich.

Some material from the original Alter-Ego was collected into trade paperback by Bill Schelly as Alter Ego Best Of Legendary Comics Fanzine (Hamster Press 1997) ISBN 0-9645669-2-3.

== Volume 2 ==
In 1997, at a reunion of comics fans, Roy Thomas and comics historian Bill Schelly met with TwoMorrows Publishing and agreed to bring back Alter Ego as a component of TwoMorrow's Comic Book Artist magazine. Thomas reprised his role as editor, with Schelly becoming associate editor. In spring 1998, Alter Ego volume 2 debuted as a flip-book with Comic Book Artist. This arrangement lasted for five issues, which have subsequently been collected into a book: Alter Ego: The Comic Book Artist Collection (TwoMorrows Publishing, 2006) ISBN 978-1-893905-59-7.

== Volume 3 ==
Alter Ego became its own magazine again in 1999, again with Thomas as editor, and formatted as a glossy magazine. It is published by TwoMorrows Publishing. FCA, the Fawcett Collectors of America fanzine, is published as part of Alter Ego. Schelly has contributed a series of Comic Fandom Archive articles to nearly every issue, as well as a column that usually focuses on notable fans of the 1960s and 1970s.

== Awards ==
In 2007, Alter Ego was nominated for an Eagle Award for Favourite Magazine About Comics, and won the Eisner Award for Best Comics-Related Periodical/Publication.
