= The Writing on the Wall =

"The writing on the wall" is an idiom that suggests a portent of doom or misfortune, based on the story of Belshazzar's feast in the Book of Daniel. There are many cultural depictions of Belshazzar's feast.

The Writing on the Wall, The Writing's on the Wall or similar titles may also refer to:

== Art ==
- Graffiti, writing or drawing made on a wall or other surface
- Writing on the Wall, a 1998 collection of cartoons by Tony Namate

== Film and television ==
- The Writing on the Wall (film), a 1910 American silent short film
- "The Writing on the Wall" (Yes Minister), a television episode
- The Writing on the Wall (1996 film), a British television film starring Bill Paterson and Lena Stolze
- "The Writing on the Wall" (Agents of S.H.I.E.L.D.), a television episode
- The Writing on the Wall (Big Love), an episode of the American TV series Big Love
- "Week 6: The Writing on the Wall", an episode of The Apprentice 3
- "Writing on the Wall", an episode of Ruby Gloom
- Writing on the Wall, a 2007 Canadian documentary film produced by Indigo Books and Music

== Literature ==
- The Writing on the Wall, an alternative title of The Transylvanian Trilogy by Miklós Bánffy
- The Writing on the Wall, a 1985 book by Phillip Whitehead
- "The Writing on the Wall", a 1999 short story by Guy N. Smith
- Writing on the Wall, a 2004 novel by Sundararajan Padmanabhan
- The Writing on the Wall, a 2005 novel by Lynne Sharon Schwartz
- The Writing on the Wall, a 2007 book by Will Hutton
- The Writing on the Wall, a 2022 novel by Jenny Eclair

== Music ==
- Writing on the Wall (band), a Scottish rock band

=== Albums ===
- The Writing's on the Wall, by Destiny's Child, 1999
- Writing on the Wall (Bucks Fizz album), 1986
- Writing on the Wall, by One Way System, 1983
- The Writing on the Wall, by Desmond Dekker, 1998
- Writing on the Wall, by Jill Phillips, 2003
- Writing on the Wall, mixtape by Gucci Mane, 2009

=== Songs ===
- "The Writing on the Wall" (Adam Wade song), 1961
- "Writing's on the Wall" (George Harrison song), 1981
- "The Writing's on the Wall" (OK Go song), 2014
- "Writing's on the Wall" (Sam Smith song), 2015
- "Writing on the Wall" (French Montana song), 2019
- "The Writing on the Wall" (Iron Maiden song), 2021
- "Writing on the Wall", by Desmond Dekker, 1969
- "The Writing's on The Wall", by Jim Reeves, 1971
- "The Writing's on the Wall", by Three Dog Night from Seven Separate Fools, 1972
- "Writing on the Wall", by Ted Nugent from Free-for-All, 1976
- "Writing on The Wall", by Eddie and the Hot Rods, 1976
- "Writing on The Wall", by The Hollies from A Crazy Steal, 1978
- "Writing on the Wall", by Lene Lovich from Stateless, 1978
- "Writing on the Wall", by Cheap Trick from Dream Police, 1979
- "Writing on the Wall", by Hazel O'Connor from Breaking Glass, 1980
- "Writing on the Wall", by RIOT 111, 1982
- "Writing's on the Wall", by Bruce Foxton from Touch Sensitive, 1983
- "The Writing on the Wall", from the musical The Mystery of Edwin Drood, 1985
- "Writing on the Wall", by Earth, Wind & Fire from the B-side of "System of Survival", 1987
- "Writing on the Wall", by George Jones from One Woman Man, 1989
- "Writing on the Wall", by One 2 Many, 1989
- "Written on the Walls", by Iced Earth from Iced Earth, 1991
- "Writing on the Wall", by Five Star from Heart and Soul, 1994
- "Writing on the Wall", by Accept from Death Row, 1994
- "Writing on the Wall", by Lee "Scratch" Perry and Mad Professor from Super Ape Inna Jungle, 1995
- "Writing on the Wall", by Vince Neil from Carved in Stone, 1995
- "Writing on the Wall", by Blackmore's Night from Shadow of the Moon, 1997
- "Writing's on the Wall", by Green Carnation from A Blessing in Disguise, 2003
- "Writing's on the Wall", by The Tea Party from Seven Circles, 2004
- "Writing on the Wall", by Adrian Belew from Side One, 2005
- "Writing on the Walls", by Underoath from Define the Great Line, 2006
- "Writing's on the Wall", by Plan B from The Defamation of Strickland Banks, 2010
- "Writings on the Wall", by Social Distortion from Hard Times and Nursery Rhymes, 2012
- "Writings on the Wall", by Parkway Drive from Ire, 2015
- "Writing on the Wall", by Bouncing Souls from Simplicity, 2016
- "Writing on the Wall", by Alter Bridge from The Last Hero, 2016
- "Writing on the Wall", by Bob Moses from Days Gone By, 2015
- "Writings on the Wall", by Role Model from Kansas Anymore, 2024
