= Michael Cavna =

American cartoonist

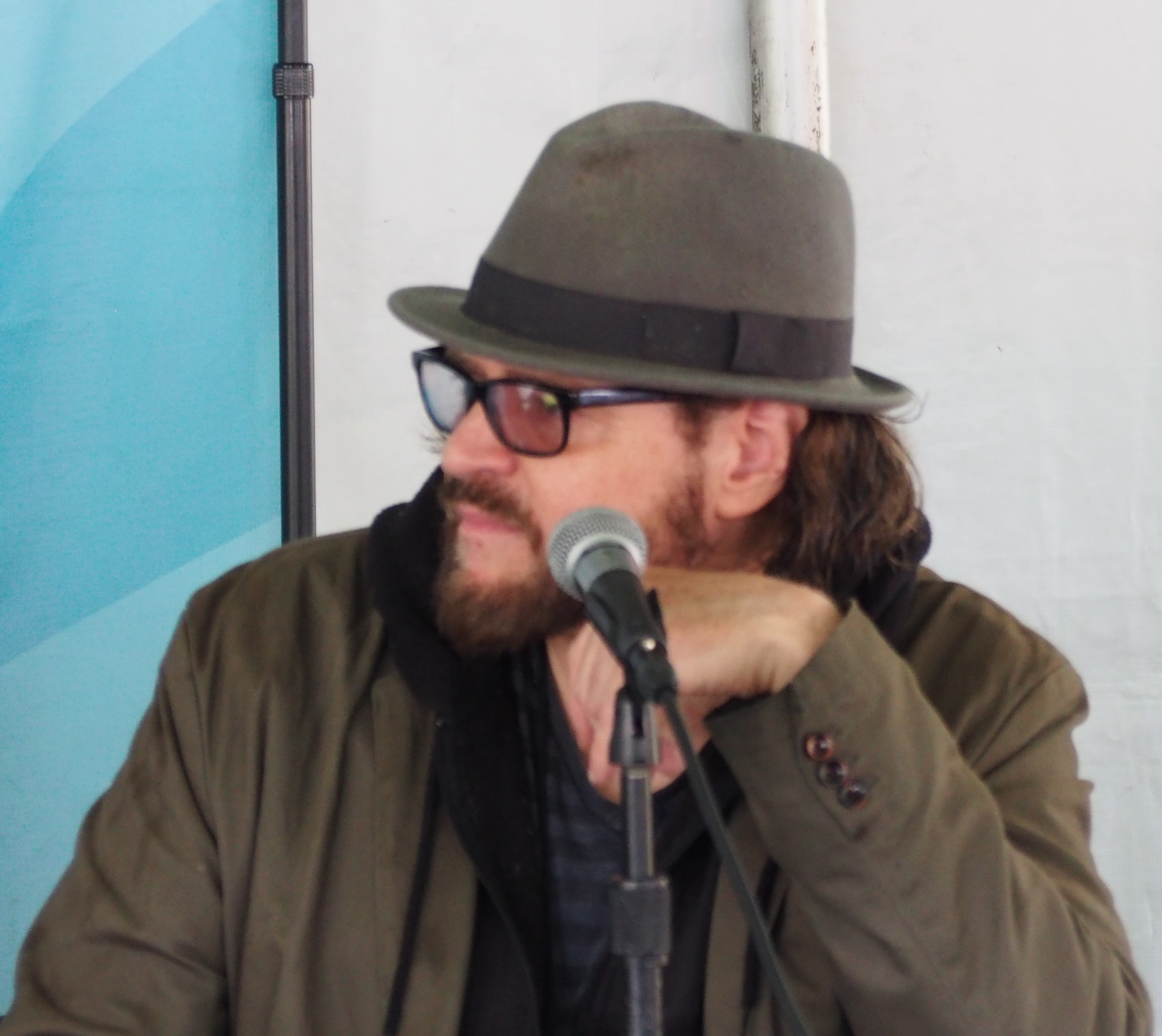
- Education: University of California, San Diego
- Writing career
- Genres: Arts, journalist

Michael Cavna is an American writer, artist and cartoonist. He is creator of the "Comic Riffs" column for The Washington Post.

His column has received more than a dozen national awards from the Society for Features Journalism, in 2013, 2014, 2015, 2016, 2017 and 2021.

== Career ==
He graduated from the University of California, San Diego.

His "Wise Up" cartoon launched the viral #Draw4Atena campaign in 2015 on behalf of jailed Iranian artist Atena Farghadani.

Cavna wrote the Harvey Award-nominated journalism profile for the Eisner Award-nominated book Team Cul de Sac: Cartoonists Draw the Line at Parkinson's. He was the emcee and co-programmer of the first-ever "Graphic Novel Night" Pavilion at the Library of Congress's National Book Festival.

In February 2015, Cavna began a cartoon that was updated monthly to mark the 545-day detention of American-Iranian journalist Jason Rezaian of The Washington Post; the National Press Club used the cartoon to raise awareness about Rezaian's case.

== Awards ==
In April 2016, his "Comic Riffs" column was an Eisner Award finalist for journalism.

In April 2017, his "Comic Riffs" columns received a National Headliner Award for lifestyle writing. In May 2017, "Comic Riffs" received a second Eisner Award nomination for journalism. In October 2017, Cavna shared his personal "Peanuts" history in the Eisner Award-winning book Celebrating Snoopy.

In April 2018, Cavna, with narrator/animator Tom Racine, won the Society of Professional Journalists' Sigma Delta Chi Award for his audio/visual storytelling for For Art's Sake.

In April 2019, his "Comic Riffs" column portfolio of arts writing and illustration received a second National Headliner Award.

In June 2020, his "Comic Riffs" received a third Eisner Award nomination for journalism.

In 2021, Cavna’s cultural coverage received a third National Headliner Award.

In 2023, Cavna received the Ink Bottle Award from the Association of American Editorial Cartoonists.
