= Tim Leong =

American journalist and creative director

Tim Leong is an American journalist and the current creative director of Entertainment Weekly. He is also the author of Super Graphic: A Visual Guide to the Comic Book Universe, published in 2013 by Chronicle Books.

Previously, he founded and edited the Eisner Award–nominated magazine, Comic Foundry, which was "a magazine that started as a website, an online magazine, and then a print magazine." He also served as the design director at Complex Magazine and Director of Digital Design at WIRED Magazine.
