= Imaginova =

American digital commerce company

Imaginova Corporation is a U.S. digital commerce company based in Watsonville, California. The company, which was started in 1999 as "Space.com" by CNN business anchor Lou Dobbs, later became known as Space Holdings Corp. Dan Stone became president, chief executive officer and a board member in 2002 and renamed the company to Imaginova in 2004. The company sold its consumer businesses to TechMediaNetwork, formally TopTenReviews, in 2009.

Imaginova promotes itself as the preeminent destination for the “intellectually curious.”

It comprises the following E-Commerce retailer: space

- LiveScienceStore.com LiveScienceStore.com

Imaginova previously owned Orion Telescopes & Binoculars until Orion was repurchased by its employees in November 2017.

Imaginova previously owned SpaceNews until it was sold to Pocket Ventures, LLC. in 2012.

Imaginova is a news provider, via the Imaginova Network of media properties, and syndicates its original content to the following news portals: Yahoo!, MSNBC, AOL and Fox News.com.

Imaginova was the developer of Starry Night software and widgets for Mac OS X, Microsoft Windows, BlackBerry, iPhone and iPod Touch. In 2008, Starry Night was acquired by Simulation Curriculum Corporation.

Simulation Curriculum Corp. is headquartered in Minnetonka, Minnesota.

Imaginova is backed by investors: Blue Chip Venture Capital; Gannett Co., Inc.; RedShift Ventures; Steelpoint Capital Partners and Venrock Associates. In August 2006, the company raised $15M in growth equity financing.
