= Michael Eury =

American comic book editor

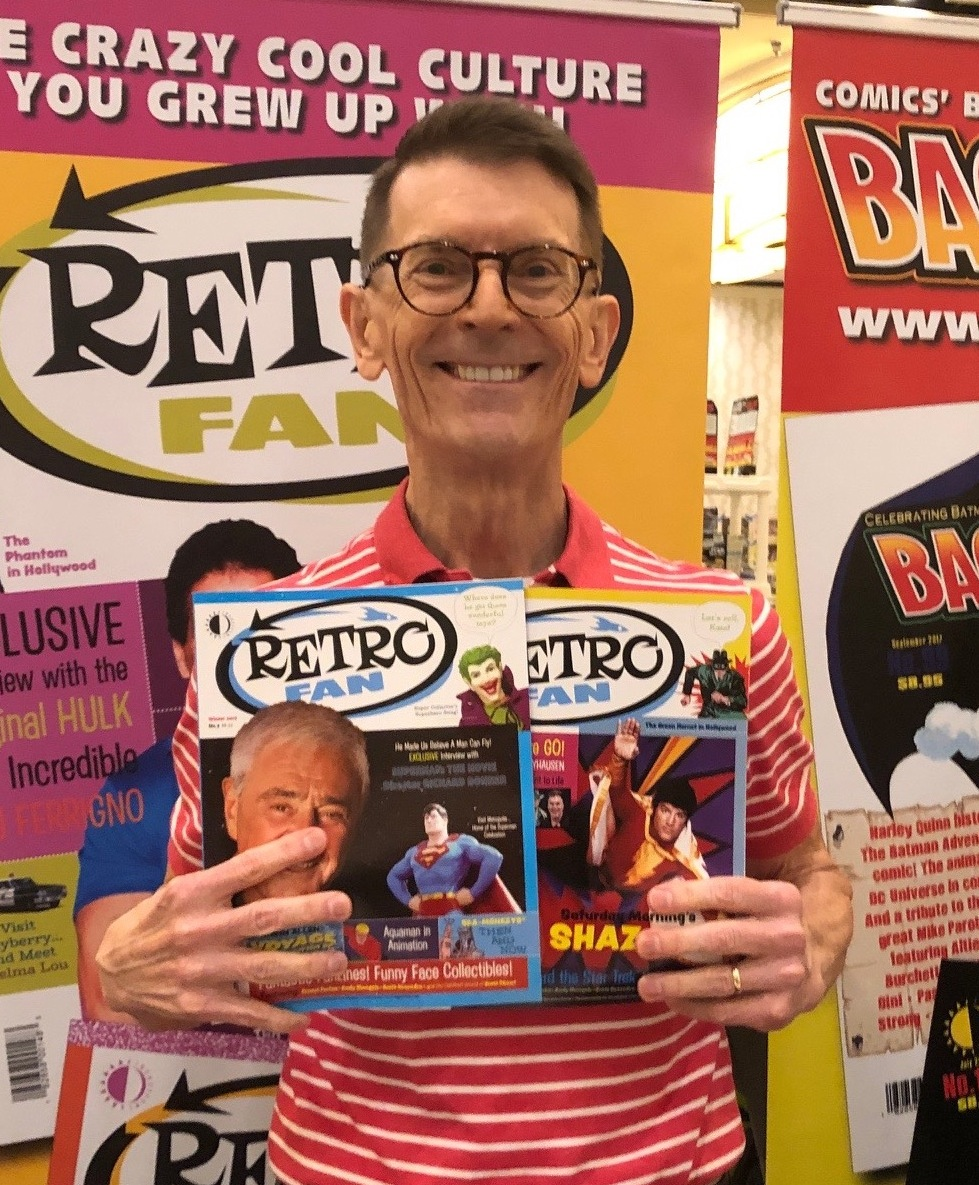
- Eury at the Mid-Atlantic Nostalgia Convention in September 2019
- Born: September 28, 1957 (age 69)
- Areas: Editor, Publisher
- Notable works: Amazing Heroes; Captain Action; Adventures of the Mask; Back Issue!
- Awards: 2016 Eisner Award; 2011 Spirit of HLAA Award

Michael "Mike" Eury (born September 28, 1957) is an editor and writer of comic books, and of reference works pertaining to comic books and other aspects of pop culture. He has worked for DC Comics, Dark Horse Comics and Comico Comics, having worked on books including Maze Agency and The Legion of Super-Heroes, originating practices such as the loose leaf format of DC's Who's Who in the DC Universe reference series.

In 2002 he began workin for TwoMorrows Publishing, and since 2003, has edited the retrospective magazine Back Issue! He is also an advisor for the Overstreet Comic Book Price Guide, and as of 2018, he has written over two dozen books examining aspects of pop culture.

Eury was diagnosed with otosclerosis in 1994, and wears dual hearing aids. He is an advocate for the rights of people with hearing loss.

== Early life ==
Michael Eury was born September 28, 1957. He grew up in Concord, North Carolina.

Eury first became interested in comics characters at age eight, when he watched the January 12, 1966, premiere of the Batman television series. Eury related:

"It was brand new and I had never seen anything like it.... Batman popularized superheroes. I got sucked into it and it was camp, it was satire. That's why it was so successful for a while – because it was part of this camp movement of the '60's where stuff was supposedly knowingly bad, so bad that it's good. It was so over the top, but kids like me believed it. I see that today, some of these actors who play these characters in the movies and they'll go to children's hospitals in costume and when they're around kids, you'll see the kids' looks of wide-eyed amazement".

Eury, who always enjoyed writing, described when he was inspired to become a comics industry professional in a 2019 interview, saying, "I was in the eighth grade with an algebra book in hand and had a Superman comic inside. I was reading the indicia – I read the fine print and saw the words, Julius Schwartz, Editor, and I'm thinking, this would be a cool job. That was in the early 70's. I wanted to do that, but when I was graduating high school, there wasn't any way to learn how to do that."

In college, Eury majored in Music Education, and minored in English.

== Career ==
=== Writing and editing ===
In 1986, Eury and his wife moved from to Wilmington, Delaware, where he wrote a local newspaper. During his time there, he submitted an article to Fantagraphics' comics industry trade journal Amazing Heroes. The submission was accepted, seeing print that year as Eury's first published work. The piece was a review of the Batman TV series that Eury wrote for editor Mark Waid, with whom Eury had previously worked for an amateur press association (AMA). Eury then began writing for them regularly, and interviewed various Marvel and DC editors, writers, and artists that he interviewed. Through these contacts, he was alerted to job opportunities for those publishers. He pursued one of these openings at Comico in Norristown, Pennsylvania, to which Eury and wife moved in 1988, so that Eury could joint Comico's staff. He remained with that publisher until 1989, at which point he moved to DC Comics, which he described as his "dream job."

At DC, Eury began as an editor, and within eight months was Dick Giordano's assistant. In 1992, he resigned from DC due to interpersonal conflicts, which he attributes largely to his then-undiagnosed hearing loss, which he said some of his colleagues perceived as a weakness. In 1993, he began work at Dark Horse Comics as an editor, but left in 1995 for the same reasons.

In 2002, Eury began work for TwoMorrows Publishing, writing Captain Action: The Original Super-Hero Action Figure (2002), a guidebook to the character Captain Action; Dick Giordano: Changing Comics, One Day at a Time (2003); and The Justice League Companion (2005). His initial success with these books led to his founding of Back Issue! in 2003, on which he serves as editor, and other reference works for TwoMorrows, including The Krypton Companion and The Justice League Companion. The Krypton Companion, a 2006 exploration of the Silver Age Superman, was praised by Reason magazine senior editor Brian Doherty, who said, "Historians of American culture owe Eury and his indefatigible publisher TwoMorrows a debt of gratitude for their relentless interviewing and documenting a part of American cultural life that's still an engine of enormous wealth-creation for our proud American megaconglomerates, and still a modern myth of great entertainment value in all its glory and absurdity, all its workmanlike repetition and fershlugginer imagination, all its Lois Lanes and Kryptos and Legion of Superheroes." Geoff Willmetts of SFcrowsnest also lauded the book, saying of the 235-page softcover, "This is a long read and you'll certainly get your money's worth."

In May 2017 TwoMorrows published Eury's retrospective book Hero-A-Go-Go: Campy Comic Books, Crimefighters, & Culture of the Sixties. The book examines various elements of pop culture from the titular decade, including the popularity of the 1966 Batman television series, Hanna-Barbera's animated cartoons, and the popular music of the area by bands such as The Beatles and The Monkees, as well as the comics of the era. The book was positively reviewed by KC Carlson of Comics Worth Reading, who praised Eury for having "unearthed huge, heaping amounts of previously seldom-discussed details about some of the more obscure and esoteric comic books in history, as well as new interviews with many of the still-living creators/survivors."

In June 2018, Eury launched the magazine RetroFan, which examines various aspects of the pop culture of 1960s to the 1980s, including material similar to that spotlighted by Hero-A-Go-Go, such as Saturday morning children's programming, popular music, and the spy films of the era. Eury had discussed the idea with TwoMorrows publisher John Morrow in 2012, but with his mother's health in decline at the time, Eury was unable to commit to another project. By 2017, she had died, and Eury, having refamiliarized himself with retro pop culture in researching Hero-A-Go-Go, decided the time was right to launch a magazine dedicated to what he called "The Crazy Cool Culture We Grew Up With". Initial columnists on the magazine included Martin Pasko, Andy Mangels, and Scott Shaw, and its debut issue featured articles on topics including The Phantom of Hollywood, Star Trek: The Animated Series, Mego Corporation's rare Elastic The Incredible Hulk toy, the North Carolina town believed to have been the basis for the fictional Mayberry in The Andy Griffith Show, and Mr. Microphone, as well as an interview with Andy Griffith Show alumna Betty Lynn. The second issue, which was Halloween-themed, featured articles on Groovie Goolies, Ben Cooper, Inc. Halloween costumes, and an interview with horror host Elvira: Mistress of the Dark.

=== Hearing loss advocacy ===
Eury has publicly discussed his struggle with adult onset hearing loss. He received his first hearing aid in 1994, and one for his other ear in 2001. In a 2019 interview, he stated "I hit rock bottom. I was depressed, angry, and got so mad at God that I threw my Bible in the trashcan. I really felt forsaken." Eury revealed that he had a profound spiritual epiphany on October 10, 2004, the day that Eury's "absolute hero", Superman actor Christopher Reeve, had died, nine years after having sustained permanent paralysis in an accident. Eury related:

"I'm absolutely convinced that I was touched by his Angel. I think God used him to send me a message because I had been broken. I was so moved by his example. He spent nine years in his wheelchair. He couldn't take a breath without a respirator, he couldn't move his arms, much less his legs, but still, he did so many things for other people as an advocate for people with spinal-cord injuries. That day I stopped bellyaching why me? and I instead asked what do I do next? It led me to the Hearing Loss Association of American, which then led me to community involvement. What a great blessing...and that's my superpower."

In 2005, Eury joined the Oregon chapter of the Hearing Loss Association of America, which provided Eury with communication strategies and a sense of community that enabled him to cope with the sense of isolation that initially resulted from his hearing loss. He eventually became the chapter's program director, and subsequently its President of the Lake Oswego, Oregon chapter. In 2006, he joined the state's board of trustees and edited the Oregon HLA's chapter's newsletter. When he moved back to North Carolina in 2007, he joined that state's HLA board of directors. He became its president in 2008, continuing in that role as of 2011.

Eury decided to become a public speaker on the affliction, for which he appeared on the cover of the Summer 2011 edition of HLAA magazine, which depicted him transforming into Superman. In 2010, Eury created a leadership-training program in North Carolina called Invisible No More, which helps people with hearing loss deal with the condition in a positive manner, and trains them to educate others. The program eventually sought out beneficiaries across the United States. On June 19, 2011, Eury attended the HLAA's Annual Awards Breakfast and Ceremony in Washington, D.C., where he was one of five individuals who received the Spirit of HLAA Award, for his work with the Invisible No More program.

In October 2019, he was the guest speaker for the Hearing Loss Association of America (HLAA) chapter based in New Bern, North Carolina, where he lives.

== Personal life ==
In 1984, Eury auditioned to be a singing telegram delivery person for Monkey Business Singing Telegrams, and was hired by that business's manager, Rose Rummel. The two eventually married and in 1986, they moved from Charlotte, North Carolina to Wilmington, Delaware, where they lived until Eury got a job with Comico in Norristown, Pennsylvania.

In 2007, the Eurys moved back to his childhood home of Concord, where he became the executive director of the Cabarrus County History Museum, and curated exhibits at the local Veterans Museum.

In 2018, after Hurricane Florence damaged parts of Eastern North Carolina, where Eury and Rose, now a writer, had lived, they moved to New Bern, North Carolina, where Eury's mother and uncle grew up.

== Awards and nominations ==
=== Wins ===
- 2011 Spirit of HLAA Award
- 2019 Eisner Award win for Back Issue

=== Nominations ===
- 2012 Eisner Award for Best Comics-Related Periodical/Journalism for Back Issue (with TwoMorrows Publishing; shared with Roy Thomas, Mike Manley, and John Morrow)
- 2016 Eisner Award for Best Comics-Related Journalism for Back Issue

== Bibliography ==
=== Arcadia Publishing ===
- Images of America: Concord (2011)
- Legendary Locals of Cabarrus County (2015)
- Legendary Locals of Concord (2013)

=== Archie Comics ===
- The Flintstones #15

=== Comico: The Comic Company ===
- Bloodscent #1
- Comico Christmas Special #1
- Elementals v.2 #1–13
- Elementals Special #2
- E-Man v.3 #1
- Empire Lanes Special #1
- Gumby's Winter Fun Special #1
- Jonny Quest Special #2
- Justice Machine #20–29
- Justice Machine Annual #1
- The Maze Agency #1–9
- Morningstar Special #1
- Sam & Max: Freelance Police Special #1
- Star Blazers #1–4
- Trollords #1–4

=== Dark Horse Comics ===
- Adventures of the Mask #1–12
- Adventures of the Mask/Toys R Us Special Edition #1
- Adventures of the Mask Omnibus
- Agents of Law #1, 2
- Barb Wire #1–5
- Batman vs. Predator II #1–4
- Catalyst: Agents of Change #1–7
- Danger Unlimited #1
- Ghost #1–7
- Ghost Special #1
- Godzilla vs. Hero Zero #1
- Hero Zero #0
- Into the Vortex #12
- The Machine #1–4
- The Mask Strikes Back #1–5
- The Mask: Virtual Surreality
- Mecha Special #1
- Motorhead Special #1
- Revelations #1
- San Diego Comic-Con Comics #4
- Superman vs. Aliens #1–3
- Tex Avery’s Comics and Stories #2
- Titan Special #1
- X #8–13

=== DC Comics ===
- Ambush Bug Nothing Special #1
- Bugs Bunny: What's Up, Doc? (contributing writer)
- Cartoon Network Presents #20
- Cool World Movie Adaptation #1
- Daffy Duck: You're Despicable! (contributing writer)
- Eclipso: The Darkness Within #1, 2
- Eclipso #1, 2
- Green Lantern Corps Quarterly #4, 5 (G’nort stories)
- Hawk & Dove v. 2 #5–17
- Hawk & Dove Annual #1
- The Huntress #13–16, "Inside DC" (weekly column appearing in DC Comics titles, 1990–1992)
- Legionnaires #1
- Legion of Super-Heroes v.4 #6–12, 26–42
- Legion of Super-Heroes Annual #2, 3
- Looney Tunes #28, 34, 39, 45–47, 49–51, 58
- Looney Tunes' Greatest Hits: What's Up Doc (contributing writer)
- Pinky and the Brain #20
- New Gods v.3 #10–18
- Secret Origins v.3 #48–50
- Timber Wolf #1
- Valor #1
- Who's Who in the DC Universe ’90 #1–16

=== Fantagraphics Books ===
- Amazing Heroes (random issues, 1986–1989)

=== Major Magazines ===
- Cracked #355

=== Marvel Comics ===
- Marvel Age #28
- Marvel Tales (Spider-Ham backups) #205, 206, 211, 214, 215, 218, 219, 223
- Sensational She-Hulk #50, 52–57
- Sensational She-Hulk by John Byrne: The Return (contributing writer)
- What The--?! #4

=== TwoMorrows Publishing ===
- Back Issue #1 - present (editor and contributing writer, 2003–present)
- The Batcave Companion (Batman history, co-writer with Michael Kronenberg, 2009)
- Captain Action: The Original Super-Hero Action Figure (2002)
- Captain Action: The Original Super-Hero Action Figure Revised Second Edition (2009)
- Comics Gone Ape!: The Missing Link to Primates in Comics (2007)
- Dick Giordano: Changing Comics, One Day at a Time (2003)
- Hero-A-Go-Go: Campy Comic Books, Crimefighters, and Culture of the Swinging Sixties (2017)
- The Justice League Companion (2005)
- The Krypton Companion (Superman history, 2006)
- RetroFan /31 - present (editor and contributing writer, 2018–present)

=== Visible Ink Press ===
- The Superhero Book (contributing writer, 2004)
- The Supervillain Book (co-editor and contributing writer, 2006)

=== Yesterday Forever ===
- Son of a Sharecropper: How Raiford Troutman Built a Business upon Faith and Family (2015)
