= TwoMorrows Publishing =

American magazine and book publisher

- Founded: September 1994; 31 years ago
- Founder: John Morrow; Pam Morrow
- Country of origin: United States
- Headquarters location: Raleigh, North Carolina
- Distribution: Diamond Book Distributors (Before 2026); Lunar Distribution & SCB Distributors (As of 2026)
- Publication types: Magazines, books, DVDs
- No. of employees: 3
- Official website: twomorrows.com

TwoMorrows Publishing is a publisher of magazines about comic books, founded in 1994 by John and Pam Morrow out of their small advertising agency in Raleigh, North Carolina, United States. Its products also include books and DVDs.

== History ==
In 1989, John Morrow and his wife Pamela founded TwoMorrows Advertising in Raleigh, North Carolina, providing advertising and graphic design services to local and national clients. The name "TwoMorrows" is a play on their last name, referring to the fact that there are two of them. Following the death of comic book artist Jack Kirby in February 1994, Morrow, a fan of Kirby's work, wanted to create a tribute. He decided to produce a Zine called The Jack Kirby Collector. Before moving forward, Morrow sought the approval of Kirby's widow, Rosalind, explaining that he never wanted Kirby's family to feel he was profiting off their name or producing something they wouldn't support. Rosalind gave Morrow her approval and shared key contacts with him, including Mark Evanier, who had worked as Kirby assistant. The Jack Kirby Collector's first issue in September 1994 was photocopied at a local drugstore and mailed out for free to about 125 fans. Morrow did not expect it to last long, but fans started writing in, asking for more. By the eighth issue, it was being carried in comic book shops across the country. In 1996, TwoMorrows Publishing was officially founded. Since then, The Jack Kirby Collector has continued publication alongside six other magazines devoted to comic book and pop culture history: Alter Ego, Back Issue!, Brick Journal (for LEGO aficionados), Comic Book Creator, Cryptology, and RetroFan. Morrow pointed out that he views his company as a preserver of comics history: "Our mission from the beginning has been to create a lasting record of a unique American art form. Even after our print books sell out, the digital editions should remain indefinitely, so researchers 100 years from now will see what comic book creators were doing during their era. It's important the we document their careers and accomplishments while we're able".

In 2004, the company branched into book publishing with The All-Star Companion by former Marvel Comics editor-in-chief Roy Thomas. As of 2025, TwoMorrows releases six to ten new books annually. Like its magazines, TwoMorrows' books are devoted to comic book history, creators, and publishers. One example is The American Comic Book Chronicles, a thoroughly researched eight-volume set of hardcovers, each recounting a specific era in comic book history from the Golden Age to the Silver Age. Other book projects include Marshall Rogers: Brightest Days and Darkest Knights; American Movie Comic Books (1930s–1970s); Futuristic, a look at how the space age influenced pop culture; and The First Comics Companion, a retrospective of the 1980s indie publisher.

Along with books devoted to such artists as Murphy Anderson, Dick Giordano, George Tuska, Gene Colan, Wally Wood, and Kurt Schaffenberger, as well as to writer Alan Moore, TwoMorrows has published books about how comics are created, such as Panel Discussions, Comics Above Ground, and Acting with a Pencil. Additionally, the company has published three collections of columns on comics by writer Mark Evanier; checklists of the works of Kirby and Wood; and the "Modern Masters" series by writer-editor Eric Nolan-Weathington. In 2006, TwoMorrows expanded into DVDs by producing an art-instruction video, and a DVD version of the company's George Pérez Modern Masters book.

=== Operations and Diamond bankruptcy ===
Despite producing a large number of magazines and books, TwoMorrows operates with just three full-time employees: founder John Morrow, his wife and partner Pam Morrow, and production assistant Eric Nolen-Weathington. Each magazine is edited and designed by freelancers. In a typical month, Morrow says, he coordinates with 20 to 50 freelance contributors from around the world. Most TwoMorrows editors are "former comics professionals", such as Michael Eury, who worked at DC Comics and Dark Horse before joining TwoMorrows in 2003. He retired in 2025 as editor of Back Issue! and RetroFan.

Until January 2026, TwoMorrows relied on Diamond Comic Distributors as its primary distributor. When Diamond went bankrupt, it owed TwoMorrows more than $65,000, nearly destroying the company. Morrow asked customers to buy directly from the TwoMorrows website, which kept the company in business. The bankruptcy delayed shipping of many titles for months, but Morrow credits signing with Lunar and SCB with saving the company. As of July 2026, TwoMorrows is distributed to comic shops through Lunar Distribution and to the mainstream retail market through SCB Distributors. Morrow says he saw "the writing on the wall" with Diamond and had been trying to find other distributors for years, but none wanted to work with a small publisher like TwoMorrows.

== Ongoing magazines ==
=== Jack Kirby Collector ===
Jack Kirby Collector was first published in limited quantities as a small, black-and-white magazine focusing on Kirby artwork and articles by Morrow and a few fellow collectors and fans. As each issue grew in size, it began to include rare or previously unpublished Kirby art, as well as uninked pencil versions of published art. Soon the magazine was being published on better paper, with glossy color covers. New and veteran comics artists were given the chance to ink reproductions of Kirby's original pencil work. Each issue carried the notation "Fully Authorized by the Kirby Estate". The magazine went on to be nominated for several awards. First issue was published September 5, 1994.

The Morrows launched fundraiser projects to fund the preservation of the thermostatic copies of Kirby's uninked pencils by scanning over 5,000 pages and cleaning them for future researchers and readers.

=== Other ongoing magazines ===
TwoMorrows expanded with a revival of former Marvel editor-in-chief Roy Thomas 1960s fanzine, Alter Ego — initially as a flip book with Comic Book Artist, then in 1999 as a standalone publication.

In 2001, TwoMorrows launched Draw! a magazine edited by animation and comics artist Mike Manley that centered on how-to and related articles for cartoonists and animators. The Morrows hired former comics writer and editor Michael Eury, author of the book Captain Action, to launch a successor publication. The new title, Back Issue!, debuted in 2003.

== Defunct magazines ==
- Comic Book Artist launched under the TwoMorrows imprint after Jon B. Cooke proposed the idea in 1998. The magazine, which covered comics of the 1960s and 1970s, went on to win several Eisner Awards. In 2003, Cooke left TwoMorrows to take it to another publisher, Top Shelf Productions.
- Comicology was a magazine that lasted four issues.
- Write Now! in 2001, comics author and editor Danny Fingeroth started Write Now, a magazine about how to write comics and animation.
- Rough Stuff was a spin-off of Back Issue!, focusing on previously unpublished penciled pages, preliminary sketches, detailed layouts and unused inked artwork debuted in July 2006.
