= Comic Book Artist =

American magazine

- Editor: Jon B. Cooke
- Categories: Comics historiography
- Frequency: Quarterly
- Publisher: TwoMorrows Publishing (1998–2002); Top Shelf Productions (2003–2005)
- First issue: Spring 1998
- Final issue: 2005
- Country: United States
- Language: English

Comic Book Artist was an American magazine founded by Jon B. Cooke devoted to anecdotal histories of American comic books, with emphasis on comics published since the 1960s. It was published by TwoMorrows Publishing and later Top Shelf Productions from 1998–2005. Its sequel is Comic Book Creator magazine which started publishing in 2013 and is also published by TwoMorrows.

Comic Book Artist primarily used lengthy interviews with the artists, writers, editors and publishers who contributed to the indigenous American art form, often featuring the first comprehensive histories of such comics publishers as Warren Publishing, Charlton Comics, Tower Comics, Gold Key Comics, and Harvey Comics, though emphasis was given as well to industry leaders DC Comics and Marvel Comics.

== History ==
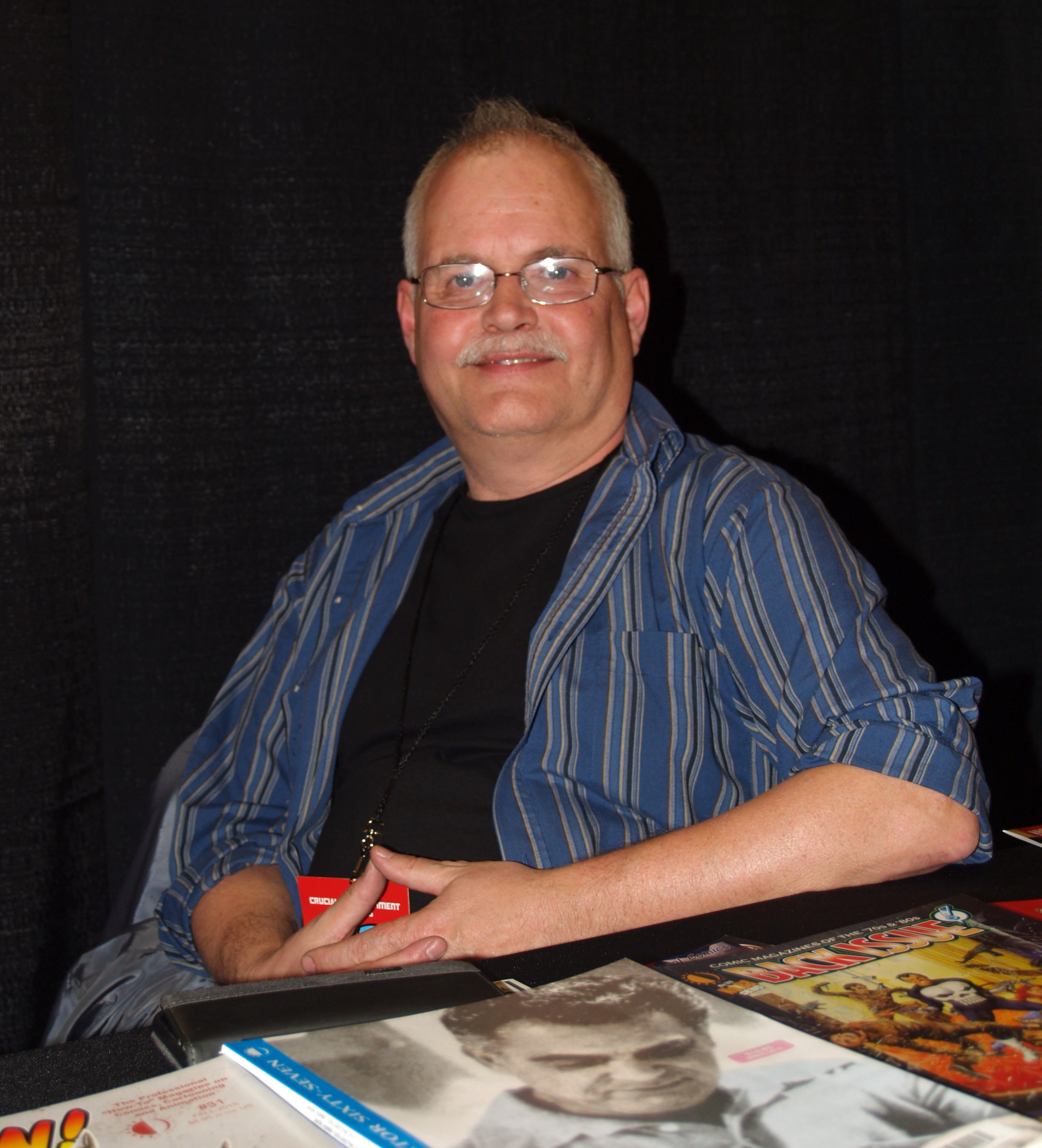
Editor Jon B. Cooke in April 2016.

=== Founding ===
Comic Book Artist began publication in 1998 as an offshoot of the magazine The Jack Kirby Collector, flagship periodical of Raleigh, North Carolina's TwoMorrows Publishing. With that periodical devoted to a single comics creator, associate editor Jon B. Cooke proposed a sister magazine devoted to other professionals who contributed to the American comics industry, particularly those who worked between the 1960s and 1980s. The first issue premiered with a Spring 1998 cover date. Most issues are each devoted to a single publisher's comics and the creators responsible within, by way of multiple interviews and oral histories to form overall impressions of a specific era.

The first five issues sported a "flip-side" magazine that revived the fondly remembered 1960s fanzine Alter Ego, founded by Dr. Jerry Bails and devoted to superhero comics. Former Marvel Comics writer and editor-in-chief Roy Thomas, who in the '60s had succeeded Bails as editor and subsequently purchased the magazine's rights, returned as editor of this new version, dubbed Volume Two. In 1999, Alter Ego again became its own magazine, which has continued past 100 issues.

The first several issues of Comic Book Artist were collected into three trade paperback volumes that also include new material.

=== Move to Top Shelf ===
In 2002, after 25 issues, the magazine and editor-owner Cooke – who is also a book designer and layout artist – left TwoMorrows for a new publisher, Top Shelf Productions, in Atlanta, Georgia.

Comic Book Artist volume two debuted in July 2003 with a redesigned format, square binding, and a color section, "Comic Book Artist Classic", that continued the thematic focus of volume one. Top Shelf published six issues of Comic Book Artist volume two, but have not released a new issue since 2005.

== Awards ==
- The Will Eisner Comics Industry Award ("The Eisner") for "Best Comics-Related Periodical" 2000, 2002, 2004, 2005
- Harvey Award, 2005, "Best Historical or Journalistic Presentation"
