= Paperback =

Book with a paper or paperboard cover

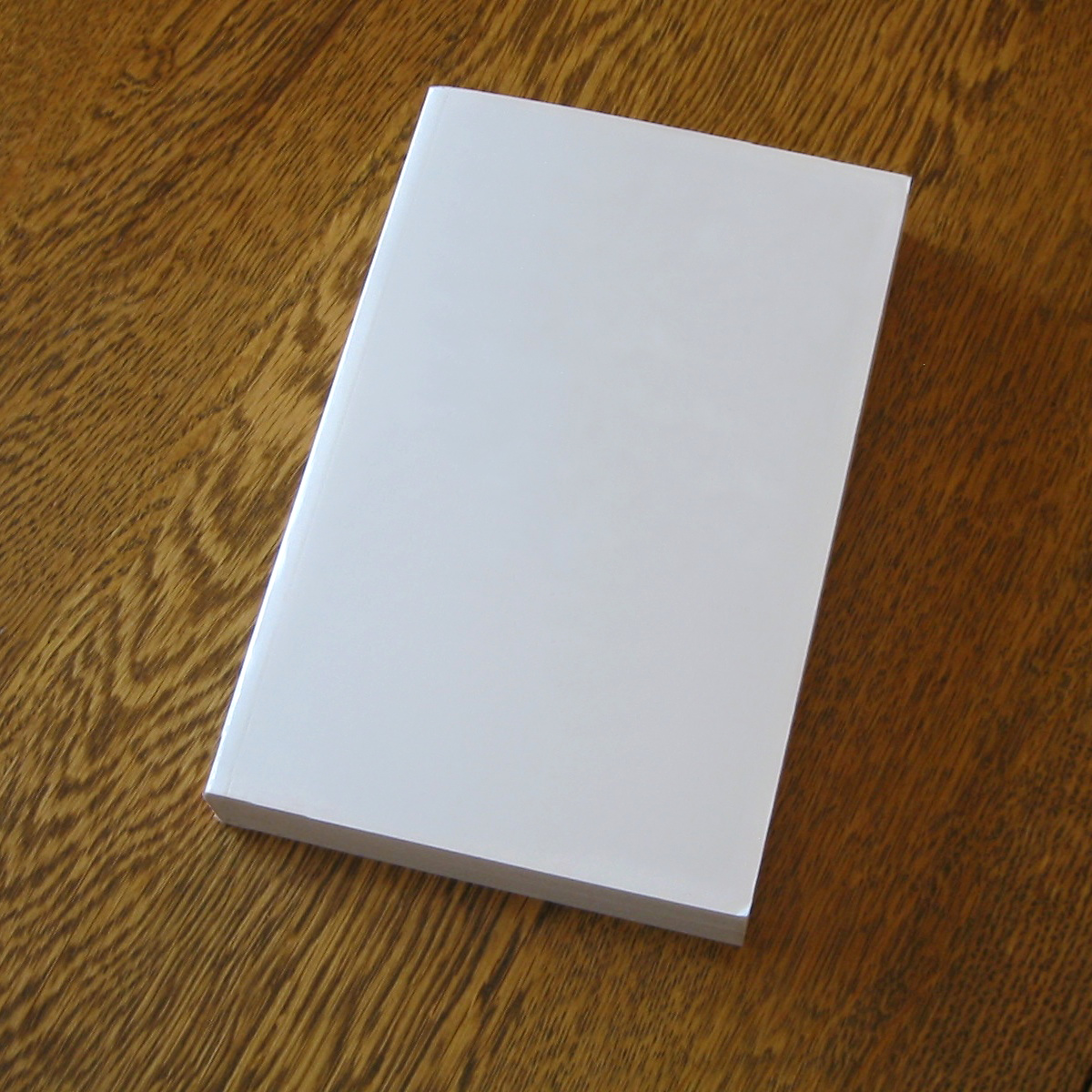
A blank paperback book

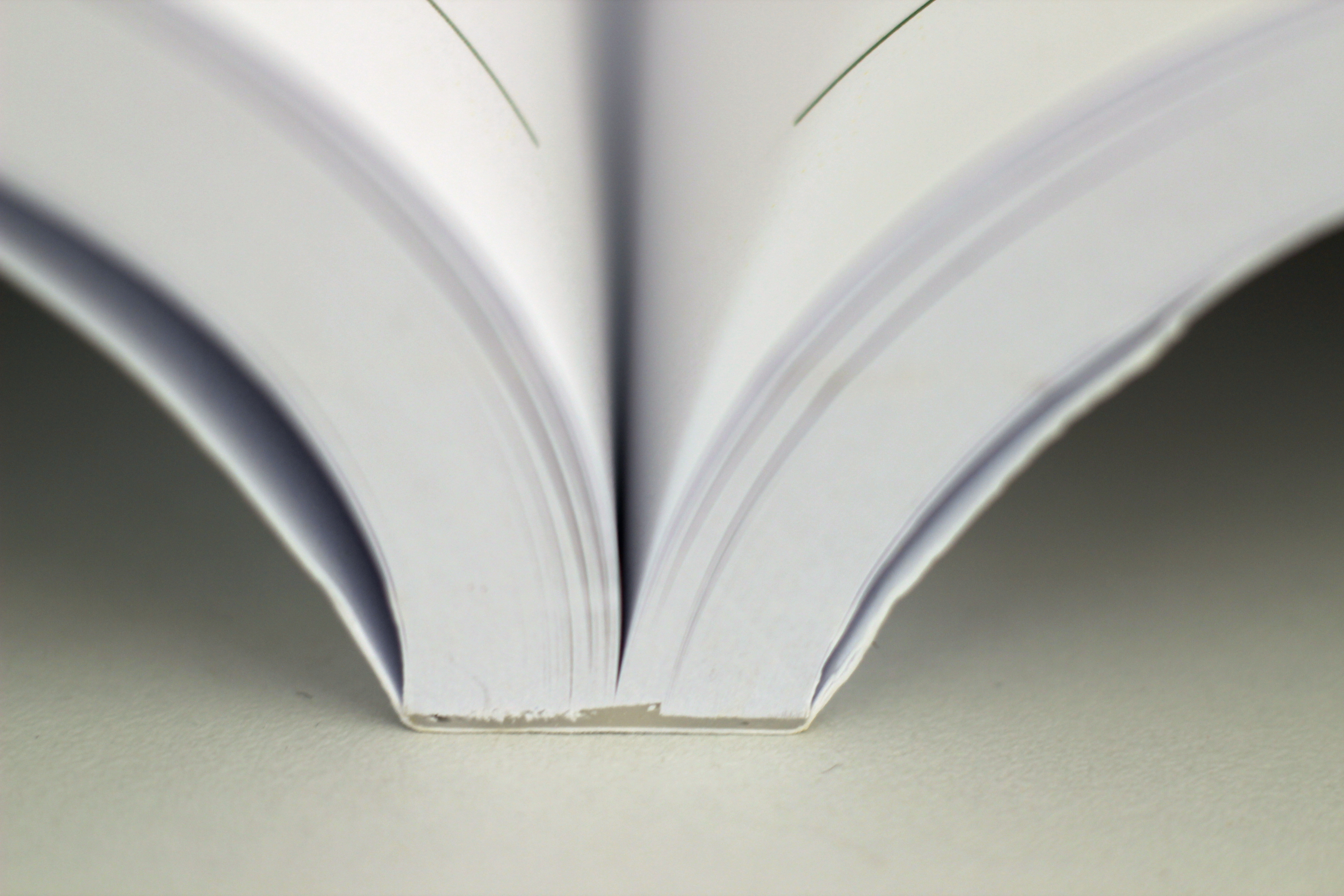
Glued binding

A paperback (softcover, softback) book is one with a thick paper or paperboard cover, also known as wrappers, and often held together with glue rather than stitches or staples. In contrast, hardback (hardcover) books are bound with board covered with cloth, leather, paper, or plastic.

Inexpensive books bound in paper have existed since at least the 19th century in such forms as pamphlets, yellowbacks and dime novels. (Note: See, for example, the Tauchnitz editions.) Modern paperbacks can be differentiated from one another by size. In the United States, there are "mass-market paperbacks" and larger, more durable "trade paperbacks". In the United Kingdom, there are A-format, B-format, and the largest C-format sizes.

Paperback editions of books are issued when a publisher decides to release a book in a low-cost format. Lower-quality paper, glued (rather than stapled or sewn) bindings, and the lack of a hard cover may contribute to the lower cost of paperbacks. In the early days of modern paperbacks, the 1930s and 1940s, they were sold as a cheaper, less permanent, and more convenient alternative to traditional hardcover books. They can also be the preferred medium when a book is not expected to be a major seller and the publisher wishes to release the book without a large investment. Examples include many novels and newer editions or reprintings of older books.

Because paperbacks tend to have smaller profit margins, many publishers try to balance the profit to be made by selling fewer hardcovers against the potential profit to be made by selling more paperbacks with a smaller profit per unit. First editions of many modern books, especially genre fiction, are issued in paperback. Best-selling books, on the other hand, may maintain sales in hardcover for an extended period to reap the greater profits that the hardcovers provide. Paperback sales declined substantially in the 21st century.

== History ==
Piles of paperback novels

The early 19th century saw numerous improvements in the printing, publishing and book-distribution processes, with the introduction of steam-powered printing presses, pulp mills, automatic type setting, and a network of railways. These innovations enabled the likes of Simms and McIntyre of Belfast, Routledge & Sons (founded in 1836) and Ward & Lock (founded in 1854) to mass-produce cheap uniform yellowback or paperback editions of existing works, and distribute and sell them across the British Isles, principally via the ubiquitous W. H. Smith & Sons newsagent found at most urban British railway stations. These paper bound volumes were offered for sale at a fraction of the historical cost of a book, and were of a smaller format, 110 mm × 178 mm (4 3/8 in × 7 in), aimed at the railway traveller. The Routledge's Railway Library series of paperbacks remained in print until 1898, and offered the traveling public 1,277 unique titles.

The Continental market also supported examples of cheap paper-bound books: Bernhard Tauchnitz started the Collection of British and American Authors in 1841. These inexpensive, paperbound editions, a direct precursor to mass-market paperbacks, eventually ran to over 5,000 volumes. Reclam published Shakespeare in this format from October 1857 and went on to pioneer the mass market paperbound Universal-Bibliothek series from 10 November 1867.

=== The early years: 1930–1950 ===
The German publisher Albatross Books revised the 20th-century mass-market paperback format in 1931, but the approach of World War II cut the experiment short. Albatross' innovations included a standardized size, use of new sans-serif fonts, use of logo and type on the cover without an illustration, and color-coding the covers by genre.

In 1935, British publisher Allen Lane, investing his own capital, initiated the paperback revolution in the English-language book market by releasing ten reprint titles to launch the Penguin Books imprint. They adopted many of Albatross's innovations, including a conspicuous logo, using only type on the cover, and color-coded covers for different genres.

The first book on Penguin's 1935 list was André Maurois' Ariel.

Lane intended to produce inexpensive books. He purchased paperback rights from publishers, ordered large print runs (such as 20,000 copies—large for the time) to keep unit prices low, and looked to non-traditional book-selling retail locations. Booksellers were initially reluctant to buy his books, but when Woolworths placed a large order, the books sold extremely well. After that initial success, booksellers showed more willingness to stock paperbacks, and the name "Penguin" became closely associated with the word "paperback" in Great Britain.

In the United States, Robert de Graaf created the Pocket Books label in 1939, partnering with Simon & Schuster to issue a similar line of reprints. Because at first Pocket Books was the only publisher of paperbacks, the term "pocket book" became synonymous with paperback in English-speaking North America. (In France, the term livre de poche, which translates as "pocket book", was used and is still in use today.) De Graaf, like Lane, negotiated paperback rights from other publishers, and produced many runs. His practices contrasted with those of Lane by his adoption of illustrated covers aimed at the North American market. To reach an even broader market than Lane, he used distributors of newspapers and magazines to distribute his books because they had a lengthy history of being aimed (in format and distribution) at mass audiences. Pocket Books was identified by its colophon of kangaroo named "Gertrude", which became one of the most recognisable logos in American paperback publishing. Pocket Books were not available in book stores because they did not carry magazines.

Pocket Books established the format for all subsequent paperback publishers in the 1940s. The books measured 6.5" by 4.25" (16.5 cm by 10.8 cm), had full-color covers, and cost 25 cents. Eventually in the 1950s the height increased by 0.5" (1.4 cm) to 7" (18 cm). The width remained the same because wire display racks used in many locations could not hold wider books. With the larger size came a higher price, first 35 cents and then 50 cents.

The Pocket Books edition of Wuthering Heights, one of the first ten books it published in 1939, emphasized the impermanence of paperbacks by telling readers: "if you enjoyed it so much you may wish to own it in a more permanent edition", they could return the 25 cent book to Pocket Books with an additional 70 cents and it would send them a copy of the 95 cent Modern Library edition "substantially bound in durable cloth."

Because of its number-one position in what became a very long list of pocket editions, James Hilton's Lost Horizon is often cited as the first American paperback book. However, the first mass-market, pocket-sized, paperback book printed in the U.S. was an edition of Pearl Buck's The Good Earth, produced by Pocket Books as a proof-of-concept in late 1938, and sold in New York City.

The first ten Pocket Book titles published in May 1939 with a print run of about 10,000 copies each were:

1. Lost Horizon (1933) by James Hilton
2. Wake Up and Live (1936) by Dorothea Brande
3. Five Great Tragedies by William Shakespeare
4. Topper (1926) by Thorne Smith
5. The Murder of Roger Ackroyd (1926) by Agatha Christie
6. Enough Rope (1926) by Dorothy Parker
7. Wuthering Heights (1847) by Emily Brontë
8. The Way of All Flesh (1903) by Samuel Butler
9. The Bridge of San Luis Rey (1927) by Thornton Wilder
10. Bambi (1928 English translation) by Felix Salten

This list includes seven novels, the most recent being six year old (Lost Horizons, 1933), two classics (Shakespeare and Wuthering Heights, both out of copyright), one mystery novel, one book of poetry (Enough Rope), and one self-help book.

The success of Pocket Books led to others entering the market. In 1941, American News Company, a magazine distributor, bought a dime novel publisher partially owned by brother and sister Joseph Meyers and Edna Meyers Williams and hired them to organize a new company called "Avon Publications". Avon copied the basic format established by Pocket Books but differentiated itself by emphasizing, as a book on collecting paperbacks says, "popular appeal rather than loftier concepts of literary merit." In 1953, Time magazine summarized its books as "westerns, whodunits, and the kind of boy-meets-girl story that can be illustrated by a ripe cheesecake jacket [cover]".

The next year Dell Publishing, which was founded in 1921 by George T. Delacorte Jr. to publish pulp magazines, joined with Western Publishing to publish Dell Books. Like Avon, Dell followed the basic format established by Pocket Books. But within that format, "Dell achieved more variety than any of its early competitors [with its] . . . instantly identifiable format of vibrant airbrushed covers for its predominantly genre fiction", specialized logos and special features like maps and lists of characters.

World War II brought both new technology and a wide readership of men and women serving in the military or employed as shift workers; paperbacks were cheap, readily available, and easily posted and carried. Furthermore, people found that restrictions on travel gave them time to read more paperbacks. Four-color printing (invented in 1906) and lamination (invented in 1936) developed for military maps made the paperback cover eye catching and kept ink from running as people handled the book. A revolving metal rack (invented in 1906), designed to display a wide variety of paperbacks in a small space, found its way into drugstores, dimestores, and markets.

During World War II, the U.S. military distributed some 122 million "Armed Services Editions" paperback novels to the troops. After the war, the former servicemembers' familiarity with paperbacks helped popularize the format.

Two new developments changed the nature of the mass-market paperback business. One was the decision by publishers to publish more recent best selling books than the older books originally published by Pocket Books. They sought reprint rights on new books and soon found themselves in competition for the biggest sellers, leading to bidding against each other for the rights and costing them more money.

The second development was the spinner rack, a metal pole with a four-sided wire frame designed to vertically hold rows of racks of paperback books. Retail store owners no longer had to devote feet of valuable counter space to low-profit paperbacks. Dozens of paperbacks could be displayed vertically in five or six square feet of floor space. (Similar racks were available for magazines and comic books.) By the late 1940s, paperback spinner racks were ubiquitous in large and small towns across the United States, in every local grocery store, drug store, dime store, and bus and train station, displaying everything from best sellers and mysteries and westerns to classics and Shakespeare. In 1955, in William Inge's Broadway play Bus Stop, it did not seem unbelievable that a long-distance bus traveller stranded by a snowstorm in an out-of-the-way cafe walks to a shelf and picks up a paperback copy of Four Tragedies of Shakespeare. "Sometimes one can find Shakespeare on these shelves among the many lurid novels of juvenile delinquents," he comments.

In 1945, Bantam Books was formed by Walter B. Pitkin Jr., Sidney B. Kramer, and husband and wife Ian and Betty Ballantine as a mass-market paperback publisher.

The fifth major 1940s publisher of mass-market paperbacks was New American Library. Originally Penguin USA, it became a separate publisher in 1948 as the New American Library of World Literature when it separated from Penguin and Victor Weybright and Kurt Enoch took over. Its original focus was classics and scholarly works as well as popular and pulp fiction. Eventually it shortened its name to New American Library and published books in the Mentor and Signet lines.

New paperback publishers continued to enter the market - Lion Books and Pyramid Books (both 1949), Fawcett Gold Medal Books (1950), Ace Books and Ballantine Books (both 1952), and Berkley Books (1955).

U.S. paperbacks quickly entered the Canadian market. Canadian mass-market paperback initiatives in the 1940s included White Circle Books, a subsidiary of Collins (UK.); it was fairly successful but was soon outstripped by the success of Harlequin which began in 1949 and, after a few years of publishing undistinguished novels, focused on the romance genre and became one of the world's largest publishers.

=== The 1950s: The paperback original (fiction) revolution ===
At first, paperbacks consisted entirely of reprints, but in 1950, Fawcett Publications' Gold Medal Books began publishing original fiction in mass–market paperback. The term paperback original applies to paperback original publications of fiction. It is not usually applied to original non–fiction publications, although paperback publishers also began issuing original non–fiction titles.

Fawcett, an independent newsstand distributor, in 1945, negotiated a contract with New American Library to distribute its Mentor and Signet titles. That contract prohibited Fawcett from becoming a competitor by publishing its own paperback reprints. Roscoe Kent Fawcett wanted to establish a line of Fawcett paperbacks, and he felt original works would not be a violation of the contract. To challenge the contract, Fawcett published two anthologies—The Best of True Magazine and What Today's Woman Should Know About Marriage and Sex—reprinting material from Fawcett magazines not previously published in books.

After these books were successfully published, Fawcett announced in December 1949 that in February 1950 it would publish "original fiction including westerns and mysteries at 25 cents in a pocket-sized format" in a series called Gold Medal Books. Publishers Weekly reported in May 1950 that Fawcett books were "similar in appearance and cover allure to many of the paperback reprints, but the story material [was] original and not reprinted from regular editions." It also said the authors would be paid a $2,000 advance with a guaranteed first printing of 200,000 copies.

That same month Fawcett released the first four Gold Medal books, original novels by W. R. Burnett, Sax Rohmer, Richard Himmel, and John Flagg – one western and three mysteries/adventure novels.

Fawcett's action led to immediate controversy, with an executive Vice president of Pocket Books attacking the whole idea, a literary agent reporting that one hardcover publisher threatened to boycott his agency if he dealt with mass market publishers, and Doubleday's LeBaron R. Barker claiming that paperback originals could "undermine the whole structure of publishing."

Sales soared, prompting Gold Medal editorial director Ralph Daigh to comment later, "In the past six months we have produced 9,020,645 books, and people seem to like them very well." In 1950 Gold Medal published 35 titles, in 1952, 66 titles.

Other paperback publishers saw Gold Medal's success and began to emulate it. Publishers Weekly reported in May 1952 that Avon had included three originals in its April releases and was seeking more. It added that Dell was "'thinking about' some systematic programs of original publishing," Lion Books had "a definite original publishing program in the works", and that Graphic had begun publishing originals about a year earlier. Bantam, Pocket Books, and New American Library said they were not going to publish originals.

Also in 1952, Ace began publishing Ace Double Novel Books, two books printed in one volume for 35 cents, one a reprint and one original, with two covers and two title pages.

In 1952, husband and wife publishers Ian and Betty Ballantine left Bantam Books and founded their own publishing house, Ballantine Books, to publish paperbacks simultaneously with their publication in hardcover by traditional publishers. Their first book, Cameron Hawley's Executive Suite, published 1 January 1952 at 35 cents in the 7" height simultaneously with Houghton Mifflin's $3.00 hardcover edition, was a success for both publishers. Of their next nine novels, two were published simultaneously by Houghton Mifflin and one by Farrar, Straus & Young, and six were stand-alone originals.

In 1953, Dell announced its line of originals, Dell First Editions, and published its first novels by Walt Grove, Frederic Brown, and Charles Einstein.

Genre categories began to emerge, and mass-market book covers reflected those categories. Mass-market paperbacks influenced slick and pulp magazines. The market for cheap magazines diminished when buyers began to buy cheap books instead. Authors also found themselves abandoning magazines and writing for the paperback market. The leading paperback publishers often hired experienced pulp magazine cover artists, including Rudolph Belarski and Earle K. Bergey, who helped create the look and feel of paperbacks and set an appealing visual standard that continues to this day. Scores of well-known authors were published in paperback, including Arthur Miller and John Steinbeck.

McClelland and Stewart entered the Canadian mass-market book trade in the early 1960s, with its "Canadian best seller library" series, at a time when Canadian literary culture was beginning to be popularized, and a call for a Canadian author identity was discussed by the Canadian people.

=== 1960s to present ===
A former Bantam Books executive cited three main factors for the rapid growth and popularity of mass-market paperbacks, namely the adoption of production and manufacturing techniques to allow quick and affordable printing in huge quantities, the large network of independent distributor (ID) wholesalers that could deliver inventory to non-bookstore outlets that included variety stores and supermarkets, and the creation of a licensing agreement that allowed publishers to reprint hardcover books in the form of mass-market paperbacks for a term ranging from two to seven years.

The peak of mass-market paperback sales has been generally acknowledged by industry veterans to be sometime between the late 1960s to the mid 1990s. In the late 1970s, mass market paperback sales leapt from $656.5 million in 1975 to almost $811 million in 1979, with sales easily outpacing hardcovers, which had sales of $676.5 million, and the new format of the trade paperback, which had sales of $227 million. In 1996, sales of mass-market paperbacks reached over $1 billion; however, sales then began to fall.

In 1998, the number of mass-market paperbacks sold in the United States fell to 484 million copies, declining by almost 9% since 1995.

Year-to-year mass-market paperback sales continued its decline into the new century. In 2011, mass-market paperbacks unit sales dropped by 23.4%, well below the 100 million units sold in 2010, and falling by almost 60% since 2008. And far below the 484 million units sold in 1998. In 2013, sales of mass-market paperback books fell 52% from 2010 levels, while the sales from ebooks doubled in 2011 from 2010. However, some publishers remained optimistic about the importance of mass-market paperbacks, citing their low consumer prices.

In 2024, mass-market unit sales dropped by 84%, from 131 million in 2004 to 21 million in 2024 and less than 18 million in 2025, a 96% decline from 1998. At the end of 2025, ReaderLink, the United States' largest book distributor to mass merchandisers, announced it would stop distributing mass-market paperback books. The decision was attributed to multiple factors, such as financial cost (a trade paperback cost approximately the same price to produce as a mass-market paperback but was far more profitable), digital book formats, and lack of customer interest. However, mass-market paperbacks for popular classic novels would still be sold to schools due to their affordability.

== Types ==
=== Mass-market ===
that most ephemeral of literary units, a pocket-sized slab of prose meant to fit a standard wire rack, printed on high-acid paper and visibly yearning to return to the crude pulp from which it had been pressed

— William Gibson, recalling Neuromancer (1984)'s first, undistinguished printing as a mass-market paperback original

The mass-market paperback is a small, usually non-illustrated, inexpensive bookbinding format. This includes the A-format books of 110 mm × 178 mm (4 3/8 in × 7 in), in the United Kingdom, and the "pocketbook" format books of a similar size, in the United States. Mass-market paperbacks usually are printed on cheap paper. They are commonly released after the hardback edition and often sold not only at bookstores, but also where books are not the main business, such as at airports, drugstores, and supermarkets.

In 1982, romance novels accounted for at least 25% of all paperback sales. In 2013, 51% of paperback sales were romance. Many titles, especially in genre fiction, have their first editions in paperback and are never published in hardcover; this is particularly true of first novels by new authors.

The mass-market paperbacks sold in airport newsstands have given rise to the vaguely defined literary genre of the "airport novel", bought by travelers to read while they sit and wait. Mass-market paperbacks also have offered collections of comic strips and magazine cartoon series, such as Ernie Bushmiller's Nancy and Chon Day's Brother Sebastian.

=== B-format ===
The term B-format indicates a medium-sized paperback of 129 mm × 198 mm (5 1/8 in × 7 3/4 in). This size has been used to distinguish literary novels from genre fiction. In the U.S., books of this size are thought of as smaller trade paperbacks (see below).

=== Trade paperback ===
A trade paperback (also called trade paper edition and trade) is a higher-quality paperback book. If it is a softcover edition of a previous hardcover edition and is published by the same house as the hardcover, the text pages are normally identical with those of the hardcover edition, and the book is almost the same size as the hardcover edition. The pagination is the same, so that references to the text will be unchanged: this is particularly important for reviewers and scholars. The only difference is the soft binding; the paper is usually of higher quality than that of a mass-market paperback, often being acid-free paper. In the United States, the term trade paperback also encompasses the medium-sized paperbacks described as B-format, above. British trade paperbacks are 135 mm × 216 mm (5 3/8 in × 8 1/2 in).

Trade paperbacks did not enter the American market until around 1960. Unlike mass-market paperbacks they are distributed by their original hard-cover publishers directly to book stores, not through magazine distributors to other retailers.

==== Trade comics ====
Trade paperbacks are often used to reprint several issues of a comic series in one volume, usually an important storyline or the entire series, and the name trade paperback has become synonymous with a collection of reprinted material. Graphic novels may also be printed in trade paperback form. Publishers sometimes release popular collections first in a hardback form, followed by a trade paperback months later. Examples include Marvel Comics' Secret War and DC Comics' Watchmen.

Japanese manga, when they are collected into volumes, are published in the tankōbon format, approximately the size of a trade-sized book. The most common tankōbon sizes are Japanese B6 (128 × 182 mm) and ISO A5 (148 × 210 mm).

== Major publishers ==
=== United States ===
- Ace Books
- Avon
- Baen Books
- Ballantine Books
- Bantam
- Berkley Books
- Belmont Books
- Black Library
- DAW Books
- Dell Books
- Dover Publications
- Fawcett/Gold Medal
- Harlequin Enterprises
- HarperCollins
- Lancer Books
- Macmillan Publishers
- Midwood Books
- Paperback Library
- Penguin Books
- Pocket Books
- Popular Library
- Pyramid Books
- Random House
- Scholastic Corporation
- Tower Publications
- Vintage Books
- Vintage Crime/Black Lizard
- Zebra Books

== See also ==
- Book size
- Bunkobon
- George Kelley Paperback and Pulp Fiction Collection
