= James Avati =

American illustrator & paperback cover artist (1912-2005)

James Sante Avati (December 14, 1912 in Bloomfield, New Jersey – February 27, 2005 in Petaluma, California) was an American illustrator and paperback cover artist. His father was a professional photographer in New York City. His mother died shortly after his birth. He was raised by his maternal aunt and eventually his father married her. While Jim was still young, his father died and another aunt and uncle helped to raise him in Little Silver, New Jersey, where he grew up. His uncle paid for his education at Princeton University where he obtained a degree in architecture in 1935.

He was always interested in painting and loved to paint. After World War II, Avati obtained a job designing display windows at Fifth Avenue department stores in New York. But he continued to paint on the side and in 1948, impressed Kurt Enoch at New American Library, a new paperback publishing house. He was a hit from the beginning and changed the style of cover painting by the early 1950s. The authors he worked with included the likes of Theodore Dreiser, William Faulkner, Erskine Caldwell, J. D. Salinger, James T. Farrell, Pearl Buck, John O'Hara, Mickey Spillane, Erle Stanley Gardner, Alberto Moravia, and James Michener.

He used professional models at first but soon used friends, family and people off the streets of Red Bank, New Jersey, his home for much of his life, as models. He sought reality in his representations on canvas and real people worked for him better than professionals.

He has been called the "Father of Paperback Book Covers" and the "Rembrandt of Paperback Book Covers".

== Personal life ==
Avati eventually moved to Petaluma, California, to pursue a love interest, and fathered nine children through two marriages, including a son who became a well-known sculptor, James R. Avati, of Salt Lake City, Utah.

He had stopped painting towards the end as he was losing his eyesight due to macular degeneration and died (February 2005) at age 92.
