= List of works by Frank Gehry =

Frank Gehry was a Pritzker Prize-winning architect. His buildings, including his private residence, have become tourist attractions. His style is sometimes described as Deconstructivist or postmodern, although he has rejected the second term.

== Completed ==
Name	City	US State/ Country	Completed	Other Information	Image
David Cabin	Idyllwild	California	1957	Built with Greg Walsh. Owned by Matthew and Mary Norris Idyllwild, California	
Kline Residence	Bel Air	California	1963		
Banneker Fire Station	Columbia	Maryland	1967		
Exhibit Center	Columbia	Maryland	1967		
Merriweather Post Pavilion	Columbia	Maryland	1967		
Park West Apartments	Irvine	California	1970	Owned by the Irvine Company. Designed with Greg Walsh; landscape design by POD. Formerly University Park Apartments.	
Ronald Davis Studio & Residence	Malibu	California	1972	Renovated by Sue and Alex Glasscock, later owned by Patrick and Jillian Dempsey. Featured in Architectural Digest in 2014. Destroyed November 2018 Woolsey Fire	
Rouse Company Headquarters	Columbia	Maryland	1974	Renovated into a Whole Foods Market in 2014	
Concord Pavilion	Concord	California	1975	Originally the Chronicle Pavilion, it has also been called the Sleep Train Pavilion	
Harper House	Baltimore	Maryland	1977		
Gehry Residence	Santa Monica	California	1978	Frank Gehry's home	
Loyola Law School (various buildings)	Los Angeles	California	1978–2002		
Spiller House	Venice	California	1980		
Santa Monica Place	Santa Monica	California	1980	Mostly demolished and renovated from 2008 to 2010	
Cabrillo Marine Aquarium	San Pedro	California	1981		
California Aerospace Museum, California Museum of Science and Industry	Los Angeles	California	1984		
Edgemar Retail Complex	Santa Monica	California	1984		
Norton House	Venice	California	1984		
Frances Howard Goldwyn Hollywood Regional Library	Hollywood	California	1985		
Information and Computer Science (ICS)/Engineering Research Facility (ICS/ERF)	University of California, Irvine	California	1986	Awarded by the American Institute of Architects in 1986 and 1987. Demolished in 2007.	
Sirmai-Peterson House	Thousand Oaks	California	1984–86		
Winton Guest House	Hudson Valley	New York	1987	Moved in 2016 to its current location from The Gainey Conference Center in Owatonna, Minnesota .	
Yale Psychiatric Institute (now Yale New Haven Psychiatric Hospital)	Yale University, New Haven	Connecticut	1989	In collaboration with Allan Dehar Associates of New Haven	
Rockwell and Marna Schnabel House	Brentwood	California	1986–89		
Herman Miller factory (currently William Jessup University)	Rocklin	California	1987–89	Factory closed in 2001 and was purchased by William Jessup University. Underwent re-design by architect Russ Taylor prior to opening of campus in 2004.	
Vitra Design Museum	Weil am Rhein	Germany	1989		
Rockwell Engineering Center and McDonnell Douglas Engineering Auditorium	University of California, Irvine	California	1990		
360 Newbury Street renovation	Boston	Massachusetts	1991	Renovated luxury condominiums.	
Chiat/Day Building	Venice	California	1991		
Artists' Studios	Santa Monica	California	1991	Mixed use, residential and working artists. 6 loft units, each privately owned	
Iowa Advanced Technology Laboratories	University of Iowa, Iowa City	Iowa	1992		
Disney Village	Disneyland Paris, Marne-la-Vallée	France	1992	Formerly Festival Disney	
Olympic Fish	Olympic Village, Barcelona	Spain	1992		
Frederick Weisman Museum of Art	University of Minnesota, Minneapolis	Minnesota	1993		
Center for the Visual Arts	Toledo	Ohio	1993		
Cinémathèque Française	Paris	France	1994		
Vitra International Headquarters	Basel	Switzerland	1994		
Siedlung Goldstein	Frankfurt	Germany	1994		
Energie Forum Innovation	Bad Oeynhausen	Germany	1995		
Anaheim Ice	Anaheim	California	1995	Formerly Disney Ice	
Team Disney Anaheim	Anaheim	California	1996	Administration facility for the Disneyland Resort	
Dancing House	Prague	Czech Republic	1996		
Guggenheim Museum Bilbao	Bilbao	Spain	1997		
Der Neue Zollhof	Düsseldorf	Germany	1999		
University of Cincinnati Academic Health Center	University of Cincinnati, Cincinnati	Ohio	1999		
Condé Nast Publishing Headquarters Cafeteria	Times Square, New York City	New York	2000		
DZ Bank building	Pariser Platz, Berlin	Germany	2000		
Museum of Pop Culture	Seattle	Washington	2000		
Gehry Tower	Hanover	Germany	2001		
Issey Miyake flagship store	Manhattan	New York	2001		
Weatherhead School of Management Peter B. Lewis building	Case Western Reserve University, Cleveland	Ohio	2002		
Richard B. Fisher Center for the Performing Arts	Bard College, Annandale-on-Hudson	New York	2003		
Maggie's Dundee, Ninewells Hospital	Dundee	Scotland	2003		
Walt Disney Concert Hall	Los Angeles	California	2003		
Ray and Maria Stata Center	Massachusetts Institute of Technology, Cambridge	Massachusetts	2004		
Jay Pritzker Pavilion	Millennium Park, Chicago	Illinois	2004		
BP Pedestrian Bridge	Millennium Park, Chicago	Illinois	2004		
MARTa Herford	Herford	Germany	2005		
IAC/InterActiveCorp West Coast Headquarters	West Hollywood	California	2005		
Marqués de Riscal Hotel	Elciego	Spain	2006		
IAC Building	Chelsea, Manhattan	New York	2007		
Mariza show stage, at the Walt Disney Concert Hall	Los Angeles	California	2007		
Art Gallery of Ontario	Toronto	Ontario	2008	under renovation	
Peter B. Lewis Library	Princeton University, Princeton	New Jersey	2008		
Serpentine Gallery 2008 Summer Pavilion	London	England	2008	Temporary	
Novartis Pharma A.G. Campus	Basel	Switzerland	2009		
Danish Cancer Society Counseling Center	Aarhus	Denmark	2009		
Lou Ruvo Center for Brain Health	Las Vegas	Nevada	2010		
Ohr-O'Keefe Museum Of Art	Biloxi	Mississippi	2010	Originally planned to open in 2006, hit by Hurricane Katrina in 2005. Additional buildings opened in 2012	
New World Center	Miami Beach	Florida	2011		
New York by Gehry at Eight Spruce Street	Manhattan	New York	2011	First skyscraper	
Opus Hong Kong	Hong Kong	Hong Kong	2011	12-story residential block located at 53 Stubbs Road, developed by Swire Group.	
Pershing Square Signature Center	Manhattan	New York	2012	70,000 sq. ft. performing arts center.	
Duplex Residence	New Orleans	Louisiana	2012	Designed and built for the Make It Right Foundation New Orleans. LEED Platinum rated	
"Five Hole" Warming Hut	Winnipeg	Canada	2012	Temporary timber and ice warming hut on the river	
Maggie's Hong Kong	Hong Kong	Hong Kong	2013		
Biomuseo	Panama City	Panama	2014		
Louis Vuitton Foundation for Creation	Paris	France	2014		
Dr Chau Chak Wing Building	University of Technology, Sydney	Australia	2014		
Facebook West Campus	Menlo Park	California	2015		
Pierre Boulez Concert Hall	Berlin	Germany	2017		
Frank Gehry Residence	Santa Monica	California	2017		
Michael Eisner Residence	Basalt	Colorado	2018		
Thomas Safran & Associates Headquarters	Brentwood	California	2019		
Louis Vuitton Maison Seoul	Seoul	South Korea	2019		
Dwight D. Eisenhower Memorial	Washington	D.C.	2020		
LUMA Arles	Arles	France	2021		
Youth Orchestra Los Angeles Concert Hall	Inglewood	California	2021		
The Children's Institute	Watts, Los Angeles	California	2022		
Grand Avenue Project	Los Angeles	California	2022		
Warner Brothers Second Century	Burbank	California	2023		

== Works in progress ==
=== In construction ===
- Guggenheim Abu Dhabi, Abu Dhabi, UAE (set to open December 11, 2026)
- Forma (Toronto), Canada
- Colburn School Campus Extension and Concert Hall, Los Angeles, California
- China Medical University Shuinan Campus food court and event hall, Taichung, Taiwan

=== Proposed ===
- World's Jewish Museum, Tel Aviv, Israel
- Torre La Sagrera in Barcelona, Spain
- Ocean Avenue Project, Santa Monica, California
- Mirvish Towers & Princess of Wales Theatre, Toronto, Ontario, Canada (proposed – no start date yet)
- Jazz Bakery, Culver City, California
- Luxury hotel, apartments and offices, Sønderborg, Denmark
- Cultural Center, Łódź, Poland (design not yet accepted)
- Dudamel Hall, Barquisimeto, Venezuela
- Battersea Power Station redevelopment Phase 3 (the "High Street" phase), London, England (as joint architect along with Foster + Partners)

=== On hold ===
- Philadelphia Art Museum Expansion
- Frank Gehry Visitor Center at Hall Winery Napa Valley, Saint Helena, California (on hold)
- The Point (Five Star Hotel & Event Center), Lehi, Utah (project on hold)
- Suna Kıraç Cultural Center, Istanbul, Turkey (construction yet to begin)
- The Carrie Hamilton Theatre, Pasadena Playhouse, Pasadena, California
- Gary Player's Saadiyat Beach Golf Course Clubhouse, Abu Dhabi, United Arab Emirates

== Unbuilt ==
- Le Clos Jordanne Winery, Lincoln, Ontario, Canada
- Museum of Tolerance, Jerusalem, Israel (Gehry stepped down from the project in March 2010)
- Atlantic Yards, New York City (left project in June 2009)
- Corcoran Gallery expansion, Washington, D.C. (project was abandoned in 2005)
- Guggenheim Museum expansion campus in downtown New York City (project was abandoned in December 2002)
- World Trade Center site Performing Arts Complex, New York City (announced October 2004, left project in 2014)

== Other works ==
- Easy Edges furniture collection (in production from 1969 to 1973)
- Official trophy for the World Cup of Hockey (2004, 2016)
- Superlight chair for Emeco (2004)
- Jewellery collection for Tiffany & Co. (2006)
- Louis Vuitton luggage (2014)
- A yacht called Foggy (2015)
- Bottle for Hennesy cognac (2020)
