= Ballantine Books =

American book publisher (1952–)

- Parent company: Random House, a subsidiary of Penguin Random House
- Founded: 1952; 74 years ago
- Founder: Ian Ballantine; Betty Ballantine
- Country of origin: United States
- Headquarters location: New York City, New York
- Official website: www.randomhousebooks.com/imprint/ballantine-books/

Ballantine Books is a major American book publisher that is a subsidiary of German media conglomerate Bertelsmann. Ballantine was founded in 1952 by Ian Ballantine with his wife, Betty Ballantine. Ballantine was acquired by Random House in 1973, which in turn was acquired by Bertelsmann in 1998 and remains part of that company.

Ballantine's original logo was a pair of mirrored letter "B"s back to back, later changing to two "B"s stacked to form an elaborate gate. The firm's early editors were Stanley Kauffmann and Bernard Shir-Cliff.

== History ==
Following Fawcett Publications' controversial 1950 introduction of Gold Medal paperback originals rather than reprints, Lion Books, Avon and Ace also decided to publish originals. In 1952, Ian Ballantine, a founder of Bantam Books, announced that he would "offer trade publishers a plan for simultaneous publishing of original titles in two editions, a hardcover 'regular' edition for bookstore sale, and a paper-cover, 'newsstand' size, low-priced edition for mass market sale."

When the first Ballantine Book, Cameron Hawley's Executive Suite, was published in 1952, the publishing industry saw that the simultaneous hardcover and paperback editions were obvious successes. Houghton Mifflin published the $3.00 (Note: equivalent to $36.37 in 2025) hardcover at the same time Ballantine distributed its 35¢ (Note: equivalent to $4.24 in 2025) paperback. By February 1953, Ballantine had sold 375,000 copies and was preparing to print 100,000 more. Houghton Mifflin sold 22,000 hardback copies in its first printing. Ballantine's sales soon totaled 470,000 copies. Instead of hurting hardback sales as some predicted, the paperback edition instead gave the book more publicity. After the film rights were sold to MGM, Robert Wise directed the 1954 film, nominated for four Academy Awards.

On the heels of that kind of sales and publicity, other Ballantine titles were seen in spinner racks across the country. Executive Suite was followed by Hal Ellson's The Golden Spike (#2), Stanley Baron's All My Enemies (#3), Luke Short's Saddle by Starlight (#4, also with Houghton Mifflin), Ruth Park's The Witch's Thorn (#5, also with Houghton Mifflin), Emile Danoen's Tides of Tide (#6), Frank Bonham's Blood on the Land (#7), Al Capp's The World of Li'l Abner (#8, with Farrar, Straus & Young) and LaSelle Gilman's The Red Gate (#9).

== Science fiction and fantasy books ==
During the early 1950s, Ballantine attracted attention as one of the leading publishers of paperback science fiction and fantasy, beginning with The Space Merchants (#21). The Frederik Pohl and C. M. Kornbluth novel had first appeared in Galaxy Science Fiction under the title Gravy Planet. Kauffman scored when he acquired and edited Ray Bradbury's Fahrenheit 451 (originally in Galaxy as a shorter version, "The Firemen").

Ballantine's science fiction line also included the unusual Star Science Fiction Stories. With cover paintings by Richard Powers, this innovative anthology series offered new fiction rather than reprints. Edited by Frederik Pohl, it attracted readers by successfully combining the formats of both magazines and paperbacks.

In the early 1960s, the company engaged in a well-known rivalry with Ace Books for the rights to reprint the works of J. R. R. Tolkien and Edgar Rice Burroughs in paperback form. Ballantine prevailed in the struggle for the Tolkien work, with their editions of Tolkien's The Lord of the Rings including a message on the back cover from Tolkien himself urging consumers to buy Ballantine's version and boycott "unauthorized editions" (i.e. the version from Ace Books). A separate Canadian edition of the books was published with different front cover art work. Tolkien asked for (and received) permission to add the back cover message. Betty Ballantine recalled: "And we did put a little statement on the back covers saying that Ace was not paying royalties to Professor Tolkien, and everybody who admired Lord of the Rings should only buy our paperback edition. Well, everybody got behind us. There was literally no publication that did not carry some kind of outraged article. And of course, the whole science fiction fraternity got behind the book; this was their meat and drink."

In 1969, Lin Carter edited the Ballantine Adult Fantasy series, which brought a number of rare titles back into print, as well as launching Katherine Kurtz's Deryni series. During the mid-1970s, Ballantine published the Star Trek Logs, a ten-volume series of Alan Dean Foster adaptations of the animated Star Trek. In 1968, Ballantine published a non-fiction book related to Star Trek, The Making of Star Trek by Stephen E. Whitfield and Gene Roddenberry.

In 1976, Ballantine published the novelization of a forthcoming science fiction film, Star Wars: From the Adventures of Luke Skywalker by George Lucas (ghostwritten by Alan Dean Foster). The book, like the film Star Wars released the following year, was an enormous success and sold out its initial print run. In the first three months, Ballantine sold 3.5 million copies.

Ballantine Books has been a frequent winner of the Locus Award for Best Publisher, winning the inaugural award and winning a further 12 awards.

== Cartoons, comics and humor books ==
Grab Your Socks!

After publishing The World of Li'l Abner, Ballantine introduced Shel Silverstein in 1956 with his Grab Your Socks! collection of cartoons from Pacific Stars and Stripes.

As an editor at Ballantine during the 1950s and 1960s, Bernard Shir-Cliff handled the Zacherley anthologies, the paperback of Hunter Thompson's Hell's Angels, Harvey Kurtzman's The Mad Reader and other early Mad paperbacks. He made four contributions to Mad and other magazines edited by Kurtzman. In 1956, Shir-Cliff edited a humor anthology, The Wild Reader, for Ballantine, including essays, poems and satirical pieces by Robert Benchley, Art Buchwald, Tom Lehrer, John Lardner, Shepherd Mead, Ogden Nash, S. J. Perelman, Frank Sullivan, James Thurber and others. The 154-page paperback was illustrated with cartoons by Kelly Freas who also did the front cover.

Another contributor to both Ballantine and the Kurtzman magazines was the cartoonist-author Roger Price. He did two humor books for Ballantine. I'm for Me First (1954) details Herman Clabbercutt's plan to launch a revolutionary political party known as the "I'm for Me First" Party. In One Head and Out the Other (1954) popularized the catchphrase "I had one grunch, but the eggplant over there." The nonsense non sequitur was immediately adopted by science fiction fandom, appearing occasionally in fanzines, as noted in Fancyclopedia II (1959).

Ballantine has also been the publisher of books featuring Jim Davis' comic strip Garfield since 1980.

== Ballantine authors ==
- Steve Berry
- Allison Brennan
- Suzanne Brockmann
- Terry Brooks
- Harriet Brown
- Jack L Chalker
- Meg Waite Clayton
- Bill Dedman
- Carol S. Dweck
- Julie Garwood
- Tess Gerritsen
- Emily Giffin
- Tommy Hilfiger
- Linda Howard
- Charlie Huston
- Jonathan Kellerman
- Demetria Martinez
- Anne McCaffrey
- C. Wright Mills
- Anne Perry
- Elizabeth Rosner
- Jeff Shaara
- Angus Wells

== Book series ==
- Ballantine Adult Fantasy series
- Ballantine Books
- Ballantine's Classic Library of Science Fiction
- Ballantine's Illustrated History of the Car
- Ballantine's Illustrated History of World War II (published in U.K. as: The Pan/Ballantine Illustrated History of World War II); later retitled as: Ballantine's Illustrated History of the Violent Century
- Ballantine Walden Edition
- Beagle Books
- Comstock Editions
- Mockingbird Books

== Imprints ==
- Ballantine Books
- Ballantine Reader's Circle
- Comstock Editions
- Del Rey
- Del Rey/LucasBooks
- Fawcett
- Ivy
- Mockingbird Books
- One World
- Presidio Press
- Wellspring
