= Richard Ballantine =

American-British bicycling writer and journalist (1940–2013)

- Born: 25 July 1940; Kingston, New York, United States
- Died: 29 May 2013 (aged 72); London, England, United Kingdom
- Education: Browning School; Columbia University
- Occupation: Author
- Spouse: Sherry Ballantine
- Children: 3
- Writing career
- Genre: Cycling
- Notable work: Richard's Bicycle Book

Richard Ballantine (25 July 1940 – 29 May 2013) was a cycling writer, journalist and cycling advocate. Born in America, the son of Ian and Betty Ballantine of Ballantine Books, and educated at the Browning School in New York and Columbia University, he principally resided in London, England. He wrote the popular Richard's Bicycle Book (1972) and its subsequent editions. He was an editor at Rufus Publications (founded by his parents) and founded several magazines including Bicycle magazine.

== Richard's Bicycle Book ==
Ballantine's Richard's Bicycle Book, published in 1972, appeared at a time when cycling was experiencing a resurgence in popularity, due in part to the oil shortages of the world oil crisis and the appearance of lightweight road bicycles. The book was a cornucopia of cycling-related information. It contained an overview of the history of the bicycle, explanations of different bicycle designs and types, various bicycle accessories, guides to basic bicycle maintenance and fitting, and was heavily laced with the author's own views and humor.

The Bicycle Book introduced many new cyclists to the world of commuting and bicycle touring and was also an early example of bicycle advocacy. In a section on road cycling, commuting, and etiquette, Ballantine firmly stated his view that cyclists, as lawful road users, had an absolute right to share existing roads, and that the safe travel of all users should take precedence in designing new streets and thoroughfares.

The book was dedicated to convicted bomber "Samuel Joseph Melville, hero".

Over the years, Richard's Bicycle Book has been through several incarnations such as Richard's New Bicycle Book (1987) and Richard's 21st Century Bicycle Book (2000).

== Human powered vehicle movement ==
Ballantine was prominent in the human powered vehicle (HPV) movement from its inception in the 1980s and active in the HPV racing movement.

He was chairman of the British Human Power Club and of the World Human Powered Vehicle Association.

== Personal ==
Ballantine was married and had three children.

== Bibliography ==
- City Cycling (2007)
- Living Ultimate Bicycle Book, DK Living, with Richard Grant (2000)
- Richard's 21st Century Bicycle Book (2000)
- Ultimate Bicycle Book, with Richard Grant (1998)
- Bicycle Repair Manual (1994)
- Cyclist's Britain (1989)
- Richard's New Bicycle Book (1987)
- Richard's Bicycle Book (1972)
