= Museum of Pop Culture =

Museum in Seattle, Washington

MOPOP
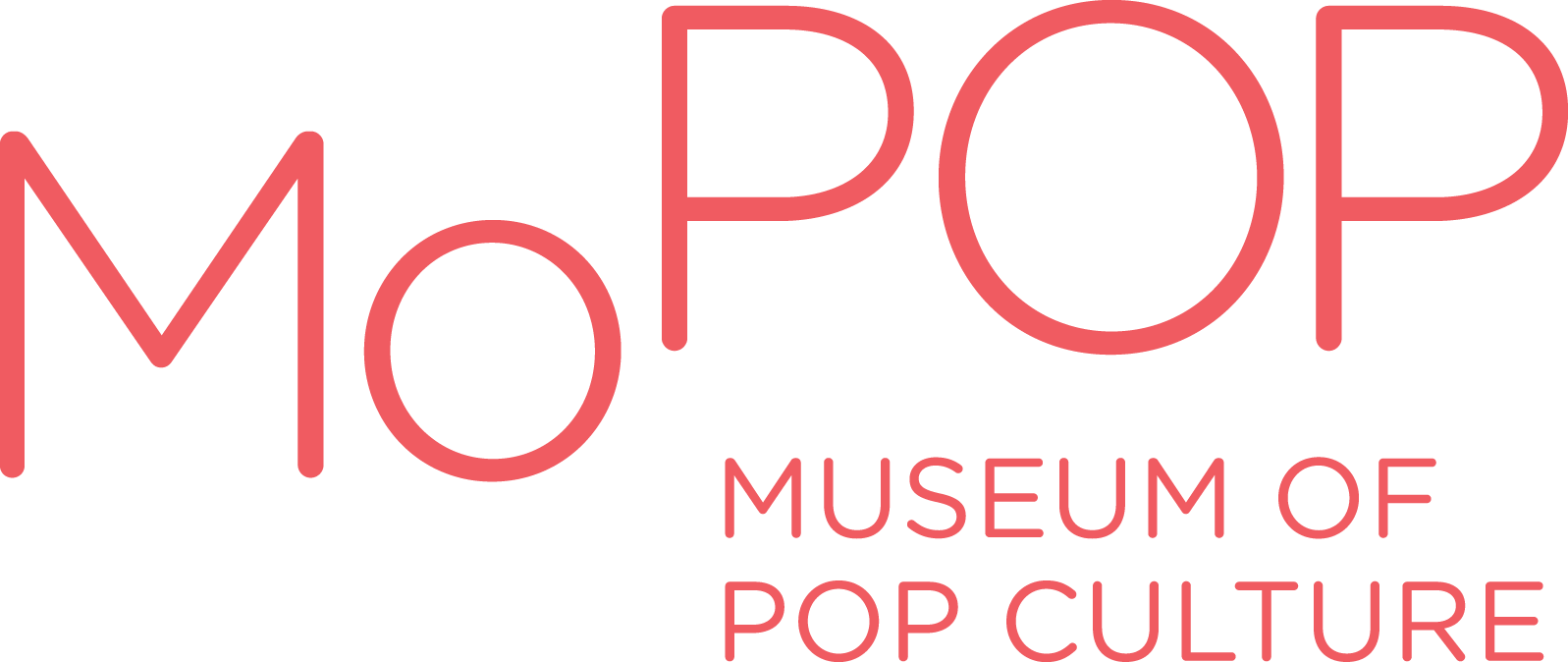

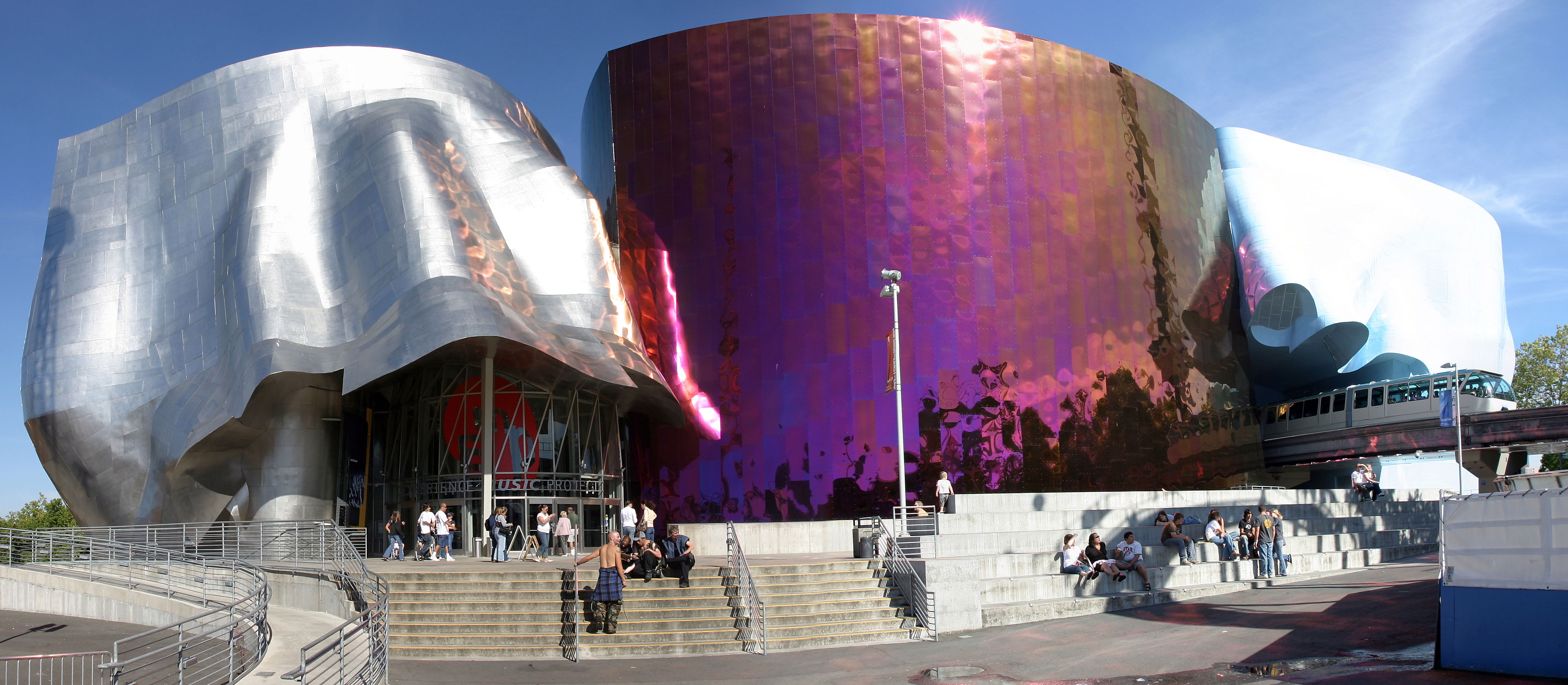
- View of MOPOP from Seattle Center with the monorail traveling through it
- Established: 2000; 26 years ago
- Location: 325 5th Avenue N Seattle, Washington, U.S.
- Coordinates: 47.6215°N 122.3486°W
- Type: Popular culture, music, science fiction, video games
- Website: mopop.org

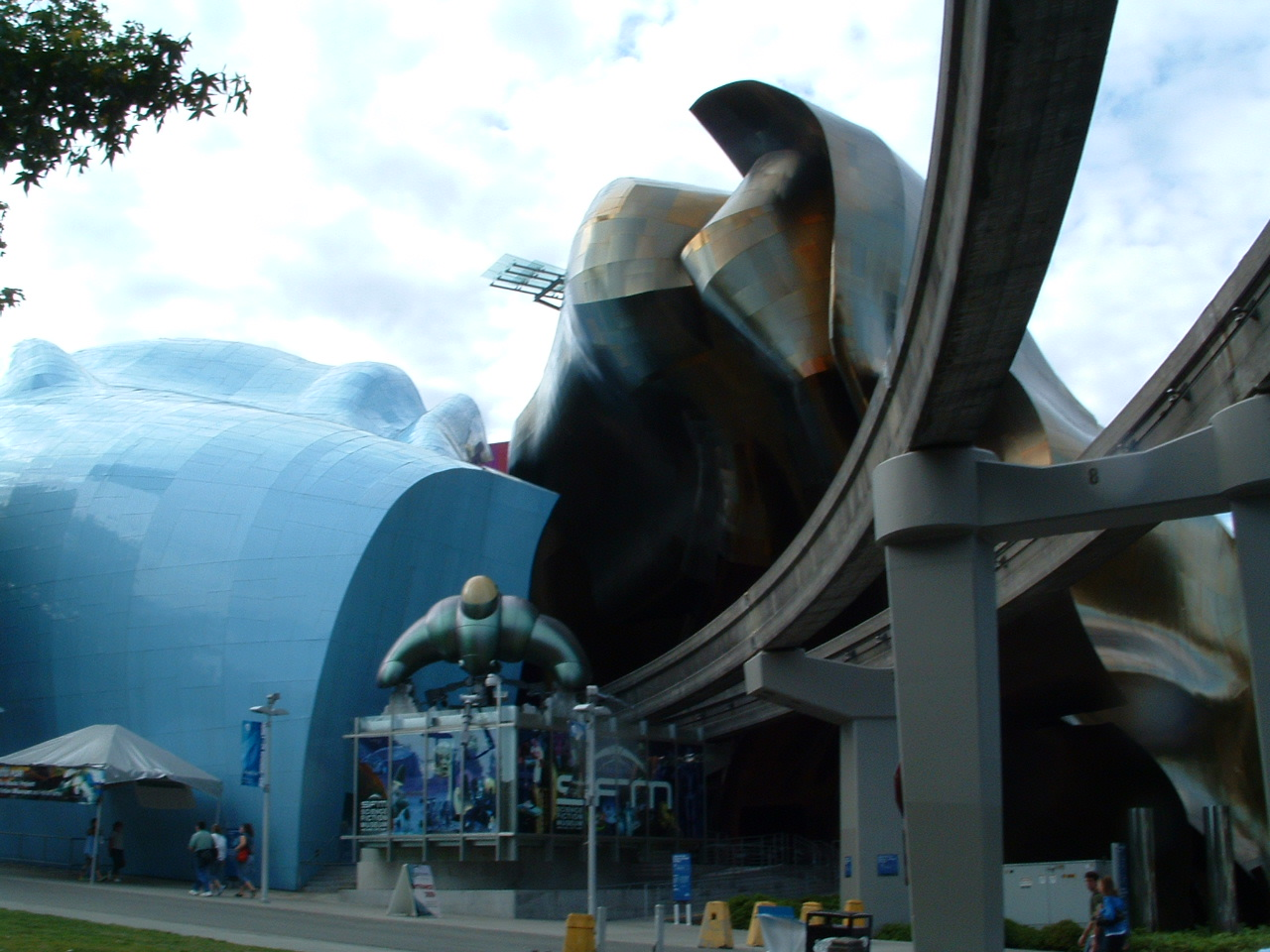
Monorail tracks going through the MOPOP building

The Museum of Pop Culture (or MOPOP) is a nonprofit museum in Seattle, Washington, United States, dedicated to contemporary popular culture. It was founded by Microsoft co-founder Paul Allen in 2000 as the Experience Music Project. Since then MOPOP has organized dozens of exhibits, 17 of which have toured across the U.S. and internationally.

The museum—formerly known as Experience Music Project, Experience Music Project and Science Fiction Museum and Hall of Fame (or EMP|SFM), and later EMP Museum until November 2016—has initiated many public programs including "Sound Off!", an annual 21-and-under battle-of-the-bands that supports the all-ages scene; and "Pop Conference", an annual gathering of academics, critics, musicians, and music buffs.

MOPOP, in collaboration with the Seattle International Film Festival (SIFF), presents the Science Fiction and Fantasy Short Film Festival which takes place every winter. Since 2007, the MOPOP celebrates recording artists with the Founders Award for their noteworthy contributions.

== Exhibits and activities ==
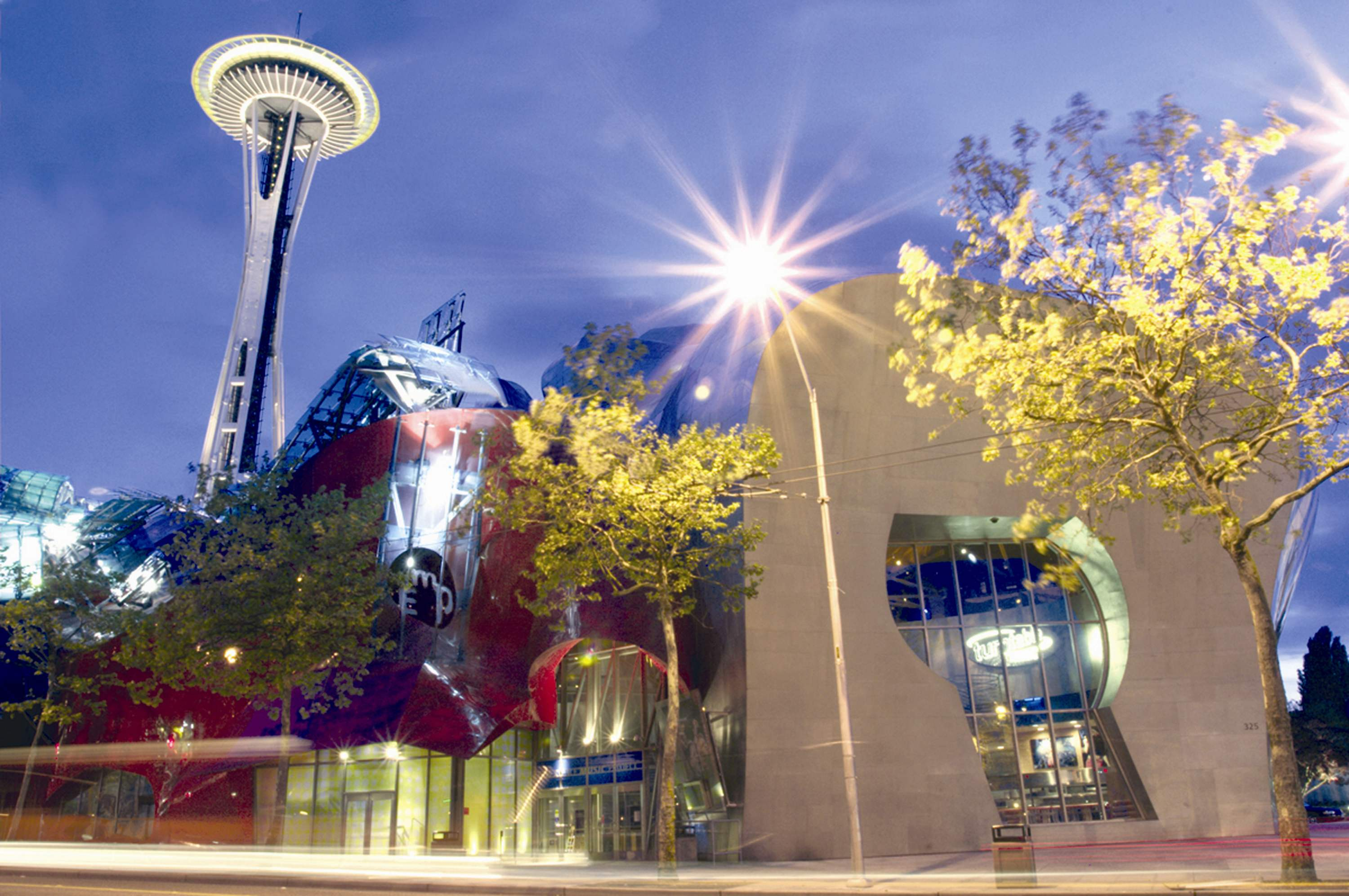
Nighttime view of MOPOP

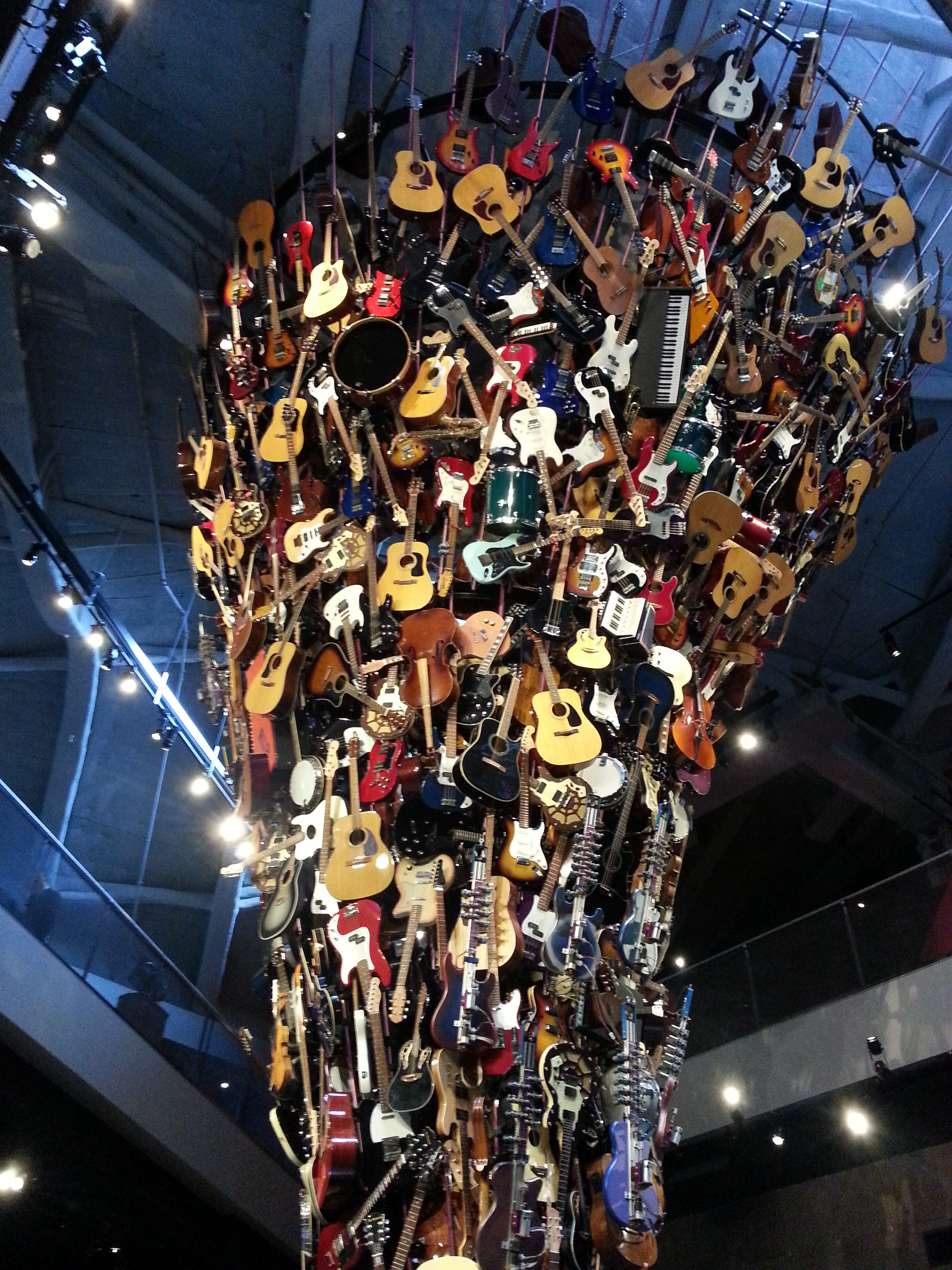
Guitar sculpture at MOPOP

MOPOP is home to numerous exhibits and interactive activity stations as well as sound sculpture and various educational resources:

- A 140,000-square-foot (13,000 m^{2}) building, designed by Frank O. Gehry, housing several galleries and the Sky Church, which features a Barco C7 black package LED screen, one of the largest indoor LED screens in the world.
- Exhibits covering pop culture, from the art of fantasy, horror cinema, and video games to science fiction literature and costumes from screen and stage.
- Interactive activities are included in galleries like Sound Lab and On Stage where visitors can explore hands-on the tools of rock and roll through instruments, and perform music before a virtual audience.
- IF VI WAS IX, a guitar sculpture consisting of more than 500 musical instruments and 30 computers conceived by British exhibit designer Neal Potter and developed by sound sculptor Trimpin.
- The world's largest collection of artifacts, hand-written lyrics, personal instruments, and original photographs celebrating the music and history of Seattle musician Jimi Hendrix.
- Educational resources including MOPOP's Curriculum Connections in-museum workshops and outreach programs; STAR (Student Training in Artistic Reach); Creativity Camps for Kids; Teen Artist Workshops; Write Out of This World, an annual sci-fi and fantasy short story contest for 3rd to 12th graders; and the Hip-Hop Artist Residency.
- Public programs such as MOPOP's Science Fiction + Fantasy Short Film Festival, Pop Conference, the Youth Advisory Board (YAB), and Sound Off!, the Pacific Northwest's premier battle-of-the-bands.

MOPOP was also the location of the first NIME workshop's concert and demo program. This subsequently became the annual International Conference on New Interfaces for Musical Expression, a venue for research on music technology.

== Science Fiction Museum ==
The Science Fiction Museum and Hall of Fame was founded by Paul Allen and his sister Jody Patton, and opened to the public on June 18, 2004. It incorporated the Science Fiction and Fantasy Hall of Fame which had been established in 1996. The museum was divided into several galleries with themes such as "Homeworld", "Fantastic Voyages", "Brave New Worlds", and "Them!", each displaying related memorabilia (movie props, first editions, costumes, and models) in large display cases, posters, and interactive displays. It was said about the museum that "From robots to jet packs to space suits and ray guns, it's all here."

Members of the museum's advisory board included Steven Spielberg, Ray Bradbury, James Cameron, and George Lucas. Among its collection of artifacts were Captain Kirk's command chair from Star Trek, the B9 robot from Lost in Space, the Death Star model from Star Wars, the T-800 Terminator and one of the domes from the film Silent Running. Although the Science Fiction Museum as a permanent collection was de-installed in March 2011, a new exhibit named Icons of Science Fiction opened as a replacement in June 2012. At this time the new Hall of Fame display was unveiled and the class of 2012 inducted.

== Science Fiction and Fantasy Hall of Fame ==
The Science Fiction and Fantasy Hall of Fame was founded in 1996 by the Kansas City Science Fiction and Fantasy Society and the Center for the Study of Science Fiction (CSSF) at the University of Kansas (KU). The chairmen were Keith Stokes (1996–2001) and Robin Wayne Bailey (2002–2004). Only writers and editors were eligible for recognition and four were inducted annually, two deceased and two living. Each class of four was announced at Kansas City's annual science fiction convention, ConQuesT, and inducted at the Campbell Conference hosted by CSSF.

The Hall of Fame stopped inducting fantasy writers after 2004, when it became part of the Science Fiction Museum affiliated with the Museum of Pop Culture, under the name "Science Fiction Hall of Fame". Having inducted 36 writers in nine years, the organization began to recognize non-literary media in 2005. It retained the quota of four new members and thus reduced the annual number of writers. The 2005 and 2006 press releases placed new members in "Literature", "Art", "Film, Television and Media", and "Open" categories, one for each category. In 2007 and 2008, the fourth inductee was placed in one of the three substantial categories.

Nominations are submitted by the public, but the selections are made by "award-winning science fiction authors, artists, editors, publishers, and film professionals".

MOPOP restored the original name online during June 2013 and announced five new members, one daily, beginning June 17, 2013. The first four were cited largely or wholly for science fiction works, however the final one was J. R. R. Tolkien, who was "hailed as the father of modern fantasy literature".

=== Science Fiction and Fantasy Hall of Fame inductions ===
Sources:

- 1996: Jack Williamson; A. E. van Vogt; John W. Campbell, Jr.; Hugo Gernsback
- 1997: Andre Norton; Arthur C. Clarke; H. G. Wells; Isaac Asimov
- 1998: Hal Clement; Frederik Pohl; C. L. Moore; Robert A. Heinlein
- 1999: Ray Bradbury; Robert Silverberg; Jules Verne; Abraham Merritt
- 2000: Poul Anderson; Gordon R. Dickson; Theodore Sturgeon; Eric Frank Russell
- 2001: Jack Vance; Ursula K. Le Guin; Alfred Bester; Fritz Leiber
- 2002: Samuel R. Delany; Michael Moorcock; James Blish; Donald A. Wollheim
- 2003: Wilson Tucker; Kate Wilhelm; Damon Knight; Edgar Rice Burroughs
- 2004: Brian Aldiss; Harry Harrison; Mary Wollstonecraft Shelley; E. E. "Doc" Smith
- 2005: Steven Spielberg; Philip K. Dick; Chesley Bonestell; Ray Harryhausen
- 2006: George Lucas; Frank Herbert; Frank Kelly Freas; Anne McCaffrey
- 2007: Ed Emshwiller; Gene Roddenberry; Ridley Scott; Gene Wolfe
- 2008: Ian Ballantine and Betty Ballantine; William Gibson; Richard M. Powers; Rod Serling
- 2009: Edward L. Ferman; Michael Whelan; Frank R. Paul; Connie Willis
- 2010: Octavia E. Butler; Richard Matheson; Douglas Trumbull; Roger Zelazny
- 2011: Vincent Di Fate; Gardner Dozois; Harlan Ellison; Jean Giraud
- 2012: Joe Haldeman; James Tiptree, Jr.; James Cameron; Virgil Finlay
- 2013: H. R. Giger; Judith Merril; Joanna Russ; David Bowie; J. R. R. Tolkien
- 2014: Frank Frazetta; Hayao Miyazaki; Leigh Brackett; Olaf Stapledon; Stanley Kubrick
- 2015: James E. Gunn; Georges Méliès; John Schoenherr; Kurt Vonnegut; Jack Gaughan
- 2016: Terry Pratchett; Douglas Adams; Star Trek; Blade Runner
- 2017: J. K. Rowling; Stan Lee; The Legend of Zelda; Buffy the Vampire Slayer
- 2018: Neil Gaiman; Vonda N. McIntyre; Doctor Who; Magic: The Gathering
- 2020: Ted Chiang; D. C. Fontana; Star Wars; Watchmen
- 2021: Nichelle Nichols; Sigourney Weaver; Godzilla; A Trip to the Moon
- 2023: John Carpenter; N. K. Jemisin; Dune; The Rocky Horror Picture Show
- 2024: Nnedi Okorafor; Nicola Griffith; Black Panther; Dragon Ball
- 2025: Tomi Adeyemi; Kim Mohan; Pokémon; The Wizard of Oz
- 2026: Lois McMaster Bujold; Tim Burton; X-Men; Metropolis

==== 20th anniversary ====
In 2016, the Hall of Fame's 20th anniversary year, the scope was changed again to include not only creators, but creations (from such genres as Cinema, Television and Games), with two examples. A total of 20 additional inductees in both categories were also announced:

- Creators: Margaret Atwood; Keith David; Guillermo del Toro; Terry Gilliam; Jim Henson; Jack Kirby; Madeleine L'Engle; C. S. Lewis; H. P. Lovecraft; Leonard Nimoy; George Orwell; Rumiko Takahashi; John Williams
- Works: 2001: A Space Odyssey; Dungeons & Dragons; The Matrix; Myst; The Princess Bride; Wonder Woman; The X-Files

The class of 2023 brought the number of members to 109, which includes the 20 additional inductees added in 2016.

In November 2016, the museum changed its name from the Experience Music Project Museum to the Museum of Pop Culture, or MoPOP for short. In 2025, the museum rebranded to MOPOP in all caps.

== Architecture ==
The Sky Church

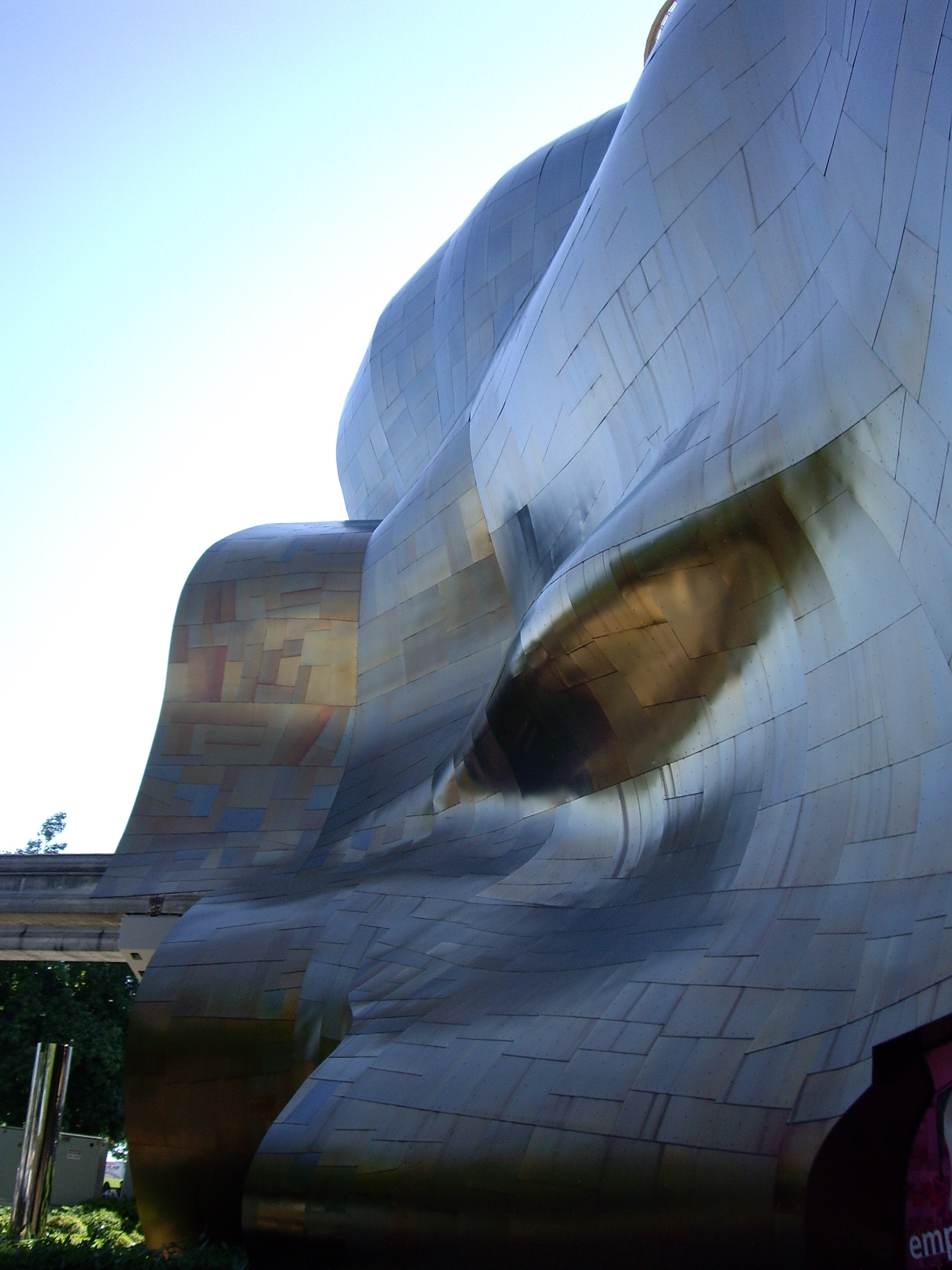
An exterior view of the building

MOPOP is located on the campus of Seattle Center, adjacent to the Space Needle and the Seattle Center Monorail, which runs through the building. The structure itself was designed by Frank Gehry and resembles many of his firm's other works in its sheet-metal construction, such as Guggenheim Museum Bilbao, Walt Disney Concert Hall, and Gehry Tower. Much of the building material is exposed in the building's interior. The building contains 140,000 square feet (13,000 m^{2}), with a 35,000-square-foot (3,300 m^{2}) footprint. The name of the museum's central Sky Church pays homage to Jimi Hendrix. A concert venue capable of holding up to 800 guests, the last structural steel beam to be put in place bears the signatures of all construction workers who were on site on the day it was erected. Hoffman Construction Company of Portland, Oregon, was the general contractor, while Magnusson Klemencic Associates of Seattle were the structural engineers for the project.

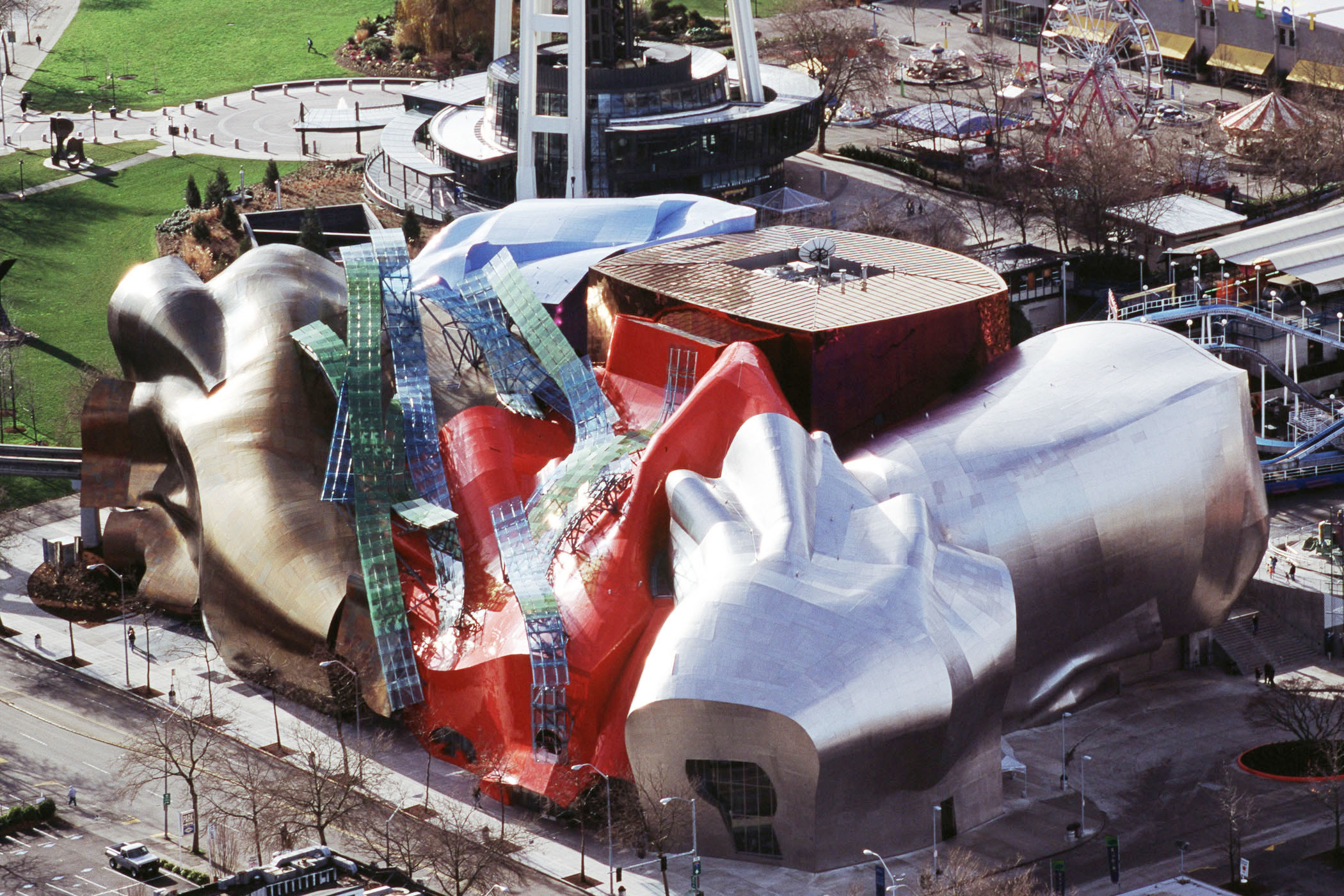
Design by Frank Gehry

Even before groundbreaking, the Seattle Weekly said the design could refer to "the often quoted comparison to a smashed electric guitar." Gehry himself had in fact made the comparison: "We started collecting pictures of Stratocasters, bringing in guitar bodies, drawing on those shapes in developing our ideas." The architecture was greeted by Seattle residents with a mixture of acclaim for Gehry and derision for this particular edifice. British-born, Seattle-based writer Jonathan Raban remarked that "Frank Gehry has created some wonderful buildings, like the Guggenheim Museum in Bilbao, but his Seattle effort, the Experience Music Project, is not one of them." New York Times architecture critic Herbert Muschamp described it as "something that crawled out of the sea, rolled over, and died". Forbes magazine called it one of the world's 10 ugliest buildings. Others describe it as a "blob" or call it "The Hemorrhoids". Despite some critical reviews of the structure, the building has been called "a fitting backdrop for the world's largest collection of Jimi Hendrix memorabilia." The building's exterior, which features a fusion of textures and colors including gold, silver, deep red, blue and a "shimmering purple haze", has been declared "an apt representation of the American rock experience."

== Finances ==
In the early 2000s, the museum suffered from financial problems. In an effort to raise more funds, museum organizers used Allen's extensive art collection to create a 2006 exhibit at the museum entitled DoubleTake: From Monet to Lichtenstein. The exhibit included Roy Lichtenstein's The Kiss (1962), Pierre-Auguste Renoir's The Reader (1877), Vincent van Gogh's Orchard with Peach Trees in Blossom (1888), Pablo Picasso's Four Bathers (1921) and several works of art from Claude Monet including one of the Water Lilies paintings (1919) and The Mula Palace (1908). Since then the museum has organized numerous exhibitions focused more specifically on popular culture, such as Sound and Vision: Artists Tell Their Stories, which opened February 28, 2007. This brought together both music and science fiction in a single exhibit, and drew on the museum's extensive collection of oral history recordings. The museum's recent exhibitions have ranged from horror cinema, video games, and black leather jackets to fantasy film and literature.

== Founders Award ==
Since 2007, the Museum of Pop Culture's Founders Award has celebrated artists whose "noteworthy contributions continue to nurture the next generation of risk-takers". The annual benefit gala is key in funding the museum's educational programs, community engagement, and exhibitions. In 2020, due to the COVID-19 pandemic, the gala had to be cancelled and for the first time ever, the event was made free to the public, streaming online on December 1, 2020, as MOPOP honored Seattle's own Alice in Chains. The benefit streaming raised more than $600,000 for MOPOP in its first night. A compilation featuring highlights from the tribute was made available for streaming on Amazon Music.

Recipients

- 2007: Ann & Nancy Wilson
- 2008: Robbie Robertson
- 2009: Steve Cropper
- 2010: Billy Cox
- 2011: Buddy Guy
- 2012: Carlos Santana
- 2013: Crosby, Stills & Nash
- 2014: Jackson Browne
- 2015: Jimmy Page
- 2016: Joe Walsh
- 2017: The Doors
- 2018: John Fogerty
- 2019: Brandi Carlile
- 2020: Alice in Chains
- 2022: Quincy Jones

== See also ==
- List of music museums
- List of works by Frank Gehry
