= Ian Ballantine =

American publisher (1916–1995)

Ian Balantin
- Balantin Books promotional photo
- Born: Ian Clyde Balantin; February 15 1916; New York City, New York, U.S.
- Died: March 9, 1995 (aged 79); Bearsville, New York, U.S.
- Education: Columbia University
- Occupation: Publisher
- Known for: Ballantine Books
- Spouse: Betty Ballantine
- Children: Richard Ballantine
- Parent(s): Stella Commins Ballantine; Edward James Ballantine

Ian Keith Ballantine (February 15, 1916 – March 9, 1995) was an American publisher who founded and published the paperback line of Ballantine Books from 1952 to 1974 with his wife, Betty Ballantine. The Ballantines were both inducted by the Science Fiction Hall of Fame in 2008, with a shared citation.

== Biography ==
Born in New York City, the son of Stella Commins Ballantine (half-niece of writer Emma Goldman) and the Scottish actor and sculptor Edward James Ballantine, Ian Ballantine received his undergraduate degree from Columbia College and his graduate degree from the London School of Economics. His Master's thesis featured the possibilities of paperback printing.

In 1939, the year of his marriage to Elizabeth "Betty" Norah, he initiated the distribution of Penguin Books in the United States (Penguin U.S. was later renamed New American Library). As a team, the Ballantines were involved in the formation of Bantam Books in 1945, and he was the first president of Bantam from 1945 to 1952.

Ballantine Books was one of the earliest publishers of science fiction paperback originals, with writers including Arthur C. Clarke and Frederik Pohl. During the 1960s, they published the first authorized paperback edition of J. R. R. Tolkien's books. Lin Carter edited their Ballantine Adult Fantasy series of classics by H. P. Lovecraft and others in the 1970s.

From 1968 through 1975 Ballantine Books published a series of 156 paperbook books under the series title "Ballantine's Illustrated History of World War II", later retitled "Ballantine's Illustrated History of the Violent Century". These were printed in both the United States and United Kingdom.

In the 1980s, Bantam books published an 18 book series on the Vietnam war in the same trade paperback format as the earlier Ballantine series, featuring color photographs.

After Ballantine Books was acquired by Random House in 1973, the Ballantines became freelance consulting editors and publishers during the 1970s. Ian and Betty Ballantine won one special World Fantasy Award for professional work in 1975 and another one shared with Joy Chant and other creators of The High Kings (Bantam, 1983), a reference book on the Matter of Britain that incorporates retellings. (It was also a runner-up in nonfiction Hugo and Locus Award categories.) Their son Richard Ballantine was an author and journalist specializing in cycling topics.

Ballantine Books has a backlist of more than 3,000 titles, and its imprints include Ballantine Books, Ballantine Reader's Circle, Del Rey, Del Rey/LucasBooks, Fawcett, Ivy, One World and Wellspring.

In the 1990s, Ballantine worked on fantasy books under the company name Rufus Publications.

Ian Ballantine was 79 when he died of a heart attack in 1995. The speakers at his May 12, 1995, memorial service included Bantam Books publisher Irwyn Applebaum, Ballantine Books vice president George Davidson and Penguin Group chief executive Peter Mayer.
