= Airport novel =

Type of genre fiction novel

The airport novel represents a literary genre that is defined not so much by its plot or cast of stock characters, but by the social function it serves. Designed to meet the demands of a very specific market, airport novels are superficially engaging while not being necessarily profound, usually written to be more entertaining than philosophically challenging. An airport novel is typically a fairly long but fast-paced boilerplate genre-fiction novel commonly offered by airport newsstands.

Considering the marketing of fiction as a trade, airport novels occupy a niche similar to the one that once was occupied by pulp magazines and other reading materials typically sold at newsstands and kiosks to travellers. In French, such novels are called romans de gare, 'railway station novels', suggesting that publishers in France were aware of this potential market at a very early date. The somewhat dated Dutch term stationsroman is a calque from French.

== Format ==
Airport novels are typically quite long; a book that a reader finished before the journey was done would be unsatisfying. Because of this length, the genre attracts prolific authors, who use their outputs as a sort of branding; each author is identified with a certain sort of story, and they produce many variations of the same thing. Well-known authors' names are usually in type larger than the title on the covers of airport novels, often in embossed letters.

== Themes ==
Airport novels typically fall within a number of other fiction genres, including:

- Crime fiction
- Detective fiction
- Historical romance
- Spy fiction
- Thrillers

Whatever the genre, the books must be fast-paced and easy to read. The description "airport novel" is mildly pejorative; it implies that the book has little lasting value, and is useful chiefly as an inexpensive form of entertainment during travel. Airport novels are sometimes contrasted with literary fiction, so that a novel with literary aspirations would be disparaged by the label.

== History ==
Early in the history of rail transport in Great Britain, as longer trips became more common, travelers wanted to read more than newspapers. Railway station newsstands began selling inexpensive books, what The Times in 1851 described as "French novels, unfortunately, of questionable character." Sales were so high that Athenaeum in 1849 predicted that railway newsstands might replace traditional bookstores.

By 1851, WH Smith had about 35 bookstores in British railway stations. Although Athenaeum reported that year that the company "maintain[ed] the dignity of literature by resolutely refusing to admit pernicious publications", The Times—noting the enormous success of The Parlour Library—surmised that "persons of the better class, who constitute the larger portion of railway readers, lose their accustomed taste the moment they smell the engine and present themselves to the railway librarian."

== Writers of airport novels ==
Writers whose books have been described as airport novels include:

- Jeffrey Archer
- David Baldacci
- Peter Benchley
- Dan Brown
- Lee Child
- Jackie Collins
- Suzanne Collins
- Michael Crichton
- Tom Clancy
- Clive Cussler
- Robert P. Davis
- Ian Fleming
- Vince Flynn
- Frederick Forsyth
- John Grisham
- Arthur Hailey
- Thomas Harris
- E.L. James
- Stephen King
- Stieg Larsson
- Robert Ludlum
- Andy McNab
- Stephenie Meyer
- James Patterson
- Jodi Picoult
- Matthew Reilly
- Harold Robbins
- Chris Ryan
- Sidney Sheldon
- Nicholas Sparks
- Danielle Steel
- Gérard de Villiers

== See also ==
- Potboiler
- Yellow-back
