= DZ Bank Building =

Office building in Berlin, Germany

Coordinates: 52°30′56″N 13°22′44″E

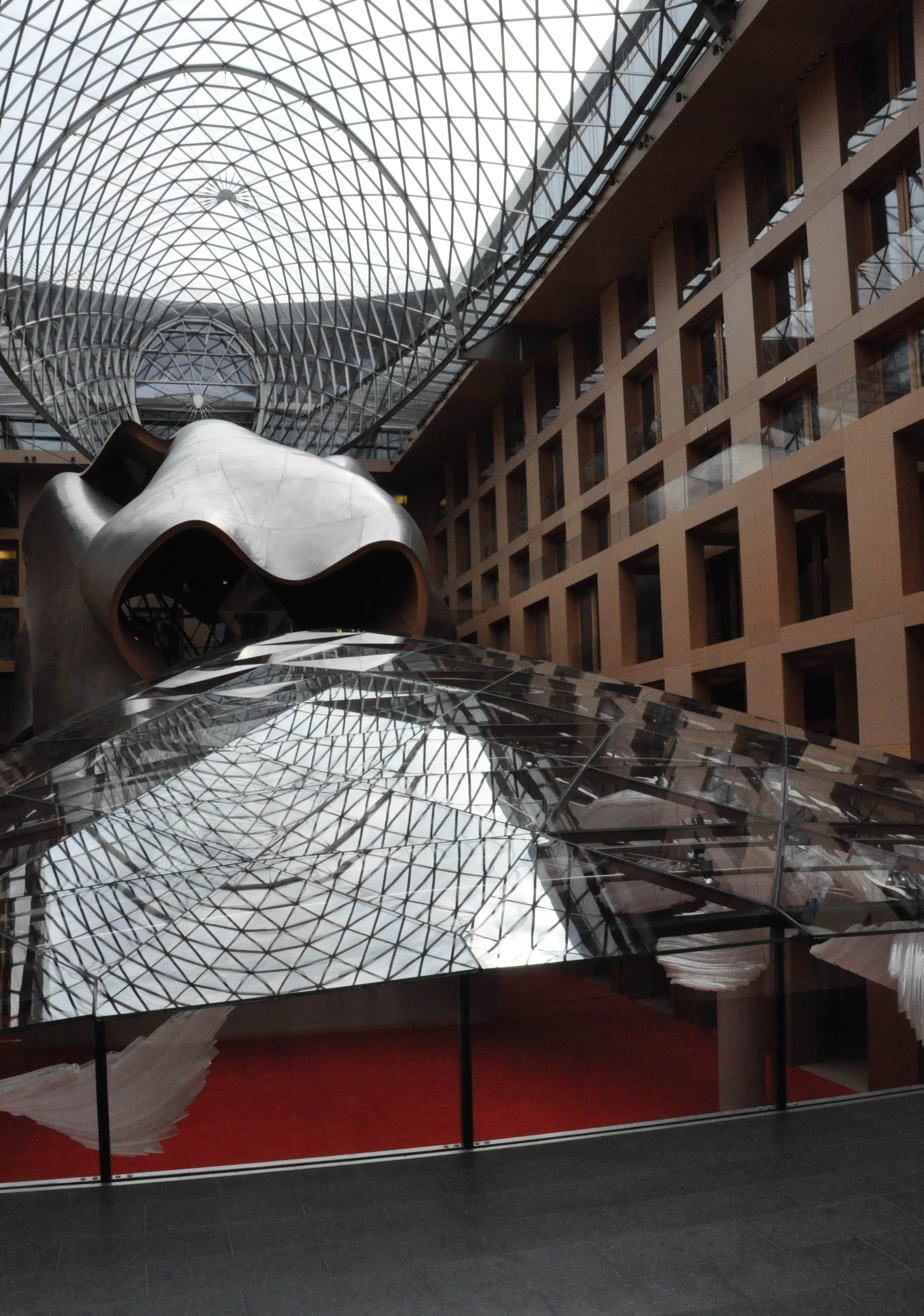
The DZ Bank Building's interior

The DZ Bank Building (formerly DG Bank Building) is an office, conference, and residential building located at Pariser Platz 3 in Berlin. It was designed by architect Frank Gehry and engineered by Hans Schober of Schlaich Bergermann & Partner. Construction began in 1998 and was completed in 2000.

The building is mixed-use. Facing the Brandenburg Gate are offices, the headquarters of Deutsche Zentral-Genossenschaftsbank. On the other side, facing Behrenstraße, are 39 residential apartments. Between the two is a large atrium, designed to be used as a conference or performance space. This is covered with a sophisticated glass-grid roof, curved in a complex form typical of Gehry's designs.

== See also ==
- List of works by Frank Gehry
- Thin-shell structure
- History of Berlin
