= New American Library =

American publisher

- Parent company: Penguin Random House
- Founded: 1948
- Founder: Victor Weybright and Kurt Enoch
- Country of origin: United States
- Headquarters location: New York City, New York, U.S.
- Imprints: NAL Accent, Obsidian, Plume, Roc, Signet, Signet Eclipse, Signet Select
- Official website: nalauthors.com

The New American Library (also known as NAL) is an American publisher based in New York, founded in 1948. Its initial focus was affordable paperback reprints of classics and scholarly works as well as popular and pulp fiction, but it now publishes trade and hardcover titles. It is currently an imprint of Penguin Random House; it was announced in 2015 that the imprint would publish only nonfiction titles.

== History ==
=== 20th century ===
New American Library (NAL) began life as Penguin U.S.A. and as part of Penguin Books of England. Because of complexities of exchange control and import and export regulations—Penguin made the decision to terminate the association, and the company was renamed the New American Library of World Literature in 1948 when Penguin Books' assets (excluding the Penguin and Pelican trademarks) were bought by Victor Weybright and Kurt Enoch (formerly head of Albatross Books).

Enoch served as president of New American Library from 1947 to 1965. He later served as head of Book Publishing at Times Mirror and then stepped down to Vice-President when John P. R. Budlong became president of New American Library in 1965.

NAL's productions were not limited to softbound reprints. Original works of mystery, romance, and adventure proved to be profitable and popular. In 1963 the company began publishing original publications in hardback format, such as the immensely popular James Bond "007" series written by Ian Fleming. NAL also published new "quality" paperback editions of classic works—for example, a Shakespeare series—which featured renowned scholars, editors, and translators. Many of those editions were oriented toward a high school and college readership. Those paperbound books included subjects in the humanities, the arts, and the sciences.

NAL also published at least two notable "magazines in book form": New World Writing in the 1950s and early 1960s, and New American Review in the latter 1960s and early 1970s (which then moved on to other publishers as American Review).

NAL enjoyed great success: by 1965, its Mentor and Signet books annually sold over 50 million volumes. In 1956 NAL reported that "over 3 million copies" of the Signet Books edition of From Here to Eternity had been sold.

The McCarthy era of the 1950s is notorious for its attacks upon communism and communistic influences in American life, and the object of federal investigations and trials was to eliminate this perceived threat and extinguish any and all communistic elements. NAL became involved with the censorship trials when certain books were deemed inflammatory and subsequently banned. Victor Weybright was asked to testify before a 1952 House Committee that examined pornography. Rather than accept government restrictions, Weybright endorsed a self-regulated censorship policy on the part of publishing companies. Weybright commented thus:

I pointed out with some justification, but certainly not as my basic argument, that the Mentor list was essential as part of the character and prestige of our company and an indispensable exhibit when our more daring fiction—by Faulkner, Farrell, and Caldwell—was attacked by the censors.

New York University Library received the NAL archive as a gift from the NAL in the spring of 1965.

=== Acquisitions and mergers ===
NAL witnessed several changes in ownership beginning in the 1960s. In 1960 Times Mirror of Los Angeles bought NAL; however, NAL continued to operate autonomously within the Mirror Company and management remained unchanged. In 1983 Odyssey Partners and Ira J. Hechler bought NAL from the Times Mirror Company for over $50 million. At the time of the sale New American Library had over 1 billion paperback books in print.

In 1985 New American Library acquired E.P. Dutton, an independent hardcover and trade publisher. During this period there was pressure for paperback publishers to add hardcover divisions. NAL had started publishing hardcovers in 1980 with mixed success and determined that Dutton would give them an edge in that space.

In 1987, the NAL was reintegrated into the Penguin Publishing Company. Penguin had been purchased by Pearson PLC in 1970.

=== 21st century ===
In 2013, Pearson PLC merged Penguin with Bertelsmann owned Random House to form Penguin Random House. New American Library is currently part of the Penguin Publishing Group, where it is a sister imprint to the Berkley Publishing Group. In June 2015 it was announced by Penguin that starting in fall of 2016, Berkley would publish fiction titles while New American Library would publish only non-fiction titles. According to Berkley/NAL Publishing Group president Leslie Gelbman this "will delineate the two publishing lines and sharpen their publishing identities."

== Imprints ==
Imprints past and present have included the following:

- Meridian
- Mentor Books, (mostly) non-fiction (with the slogan, "Good reading for the millions")
- Mentor-Omega, featuring Catholic philosophers
- Mentor Executive Library, for businesspeople
- Mentor-Unesco Art Books
- NAL Trade
- Plume
- Signet Books
- Signet Classic, paperback reprints of classics from Giovanni Boccaccio to Sinclair Lewis, accompanied by introductions and in newer editions, afterwords.
- Signet Fiction
- Signet Science
- Signet Key, for young readers ages 10 to 14.
- Signette

== Notable authors ==
- Eric Jerome Dickey
- Harlan Ellison
- William Faulkner
- James Joyce
- Stephen King
- Arthur Koestler
- John Lange (pseudonym of Michael Crichton)
- Susan Meissner
- Flannery O'Connor
- George Orwell
- Ayn Rand
- Mickey Spillane

== Notable cover illustrators ==
- James Avati
- Paul Bacon
- Alberto Beltrán
- Jack Davis
- Mort Drucker
- Nick Eggenhofer
- S. Neil Fujita
- Milton Glaser
- James Hill
- Robert Jonas
- Victor Kalin
- Saul Lambert
- Robert McGinnis
- Robert Maguire
- Stanley Meltzoff
- Norman Mingo
- Barye Phillips
- Rudolph "Rudy" Nappi
- Steele Savage
- Robert E. Schulz
- Alex Tsao
- Stanley M. Zuckerberg
