= Kurt Enoch =

German-American publisher

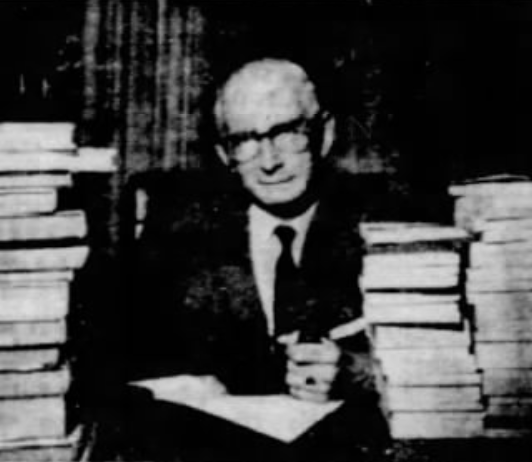
- Enoch in 1964
- Born: 18 November 1895; Hamburg, Germany
- Died: 15 February 1982 (aged 86); Puerto Rico
- Occupation: Publisher
- Known for: Co-founder of Albatross Books, Penguin Books Inc. and New American Library

Kurt Enoch (22 November 1895 – 15 February 1982) was a German-born American publisher who co-founded Albatross Books in Germany and Penguin Books Inc. and New American Library in the United States, bringing high-quality paperback fiction and non-fiction to the mass market in those countries.

== Early life ==
Kurt Enoch was born in Hamburg, then part of the German Empire, on 22 November 1895. He was the son of Otto Enoch (1860–1934), an entrepreneur and publisher, and his wife, Rosa. His parents were from a liberal Jewish background and encouraged their son to study literature and devote himself to his education.

After graduating from school and working as a volunteer in the Gselliussche Buchhandlung, a bookshop in Berlin, the First World War began and he joined the German army and was sent to the Western front on 27 November 1915.

== Gebrüder Enoch Verlag ==
Returning from the war in December 1918, Kurt Enoch began to help in the family business, which comprised a printing company named Gebrüder Enoch Verlag (English, "Enoch Brothers Press"), a book and magazine distribution enterprise and a publishing company. He progressively came to realize that he was mainly interested in the profession of publishing rather than in printing. For this reason his father decided that the focus of the family business should henceforth be publishing and that the printing plant should be sold.

Kurt Enoch completed a doctorate at the University of Hamburg and took over the family business from his father, whose health was declining. He strived for a national profile for the publishing business by seeking out important writers and talented new writers and adding foreign translations and books about other parts of the world to the catalogue.

== Albatross Books ==
In 1932 Enoch joined the English translator John Holroyd-Reece and the German publisher Max Christian Wegner to found a publishing house with the name Albatross Books in Hamburg and launched a paperback book series named the Albatross Modern Continental Library.

Similarly to the long established Tauchnitz Editions, this new series published inexpensive English-language reprints of American and British authors and sold them in all parts of the world except the British Empire. The list included highbrow authors (such as Virginia Woolf, James Joyce and D.H. Lawrence), middlebrow authors (such as Richard Aldington) and lowbrow writing (including detective fiction).

However, the Albatross Modern Continental Library stood out in the marketplace "with an eye for design and colour", which included the introduction of colour-coding for different categories of books "in the form of fully saturated covers: red for crime, blue for romance, yellow for literary novels and essays, purple for biography and history, green for travel, orange for short stories", improved typography and modern editorial policies. These bright and modern looking volumes sold in vast numbers.

The series was soon outselling Tauchnitz Editions and in 1934 Albatross Books assumed editorial control of Tauchnitz. Enoch would act as the sole distributor for the series.

== Flight from Germany and France ==
The coming to power of the National Socialists meant that Enoch with his Jewish background found it increasingly difficult to work as a publisher in Germany. For that reason he transferred his shares in the company to his business partner Christian Wegner. He also arranged for the distribution of Albatross titles outside Germany to be handled through a newly founded firm that would be located in Paris and headed by himself.

When war broke out in 1939, Enoch was briefly interned in France. With the German occupation of France, he realized he had to give up his publishing company and flee, and he managed to obtain entry visas for himself, his wife and his two daughters to the United States. They fled across the Pyrenees and through Spain and Portugal and finally arrived in the United States on 12 October 1940.

== Penguin Books Inc. ==
After his arrival in the U.S., Enoch quickly set about getting in touch with colleagues in the American publishing world, including Fred Melcher of Publishers Weekly, "Ben Huebsch of Viking, Charles Scribner of the Scribner family house and Bennett Cerf of Random House".

Unlike certain other German emigre publishers in the United States including Kurt and Helen Wolff who concentrated on publishing European classics and works from writers recently exiled from Nazi-ruled countries, Enoch eagerly sought available opportunities in the existing American market. He noted that there was limited access to books outside the larger cities of the United States, a gap that the firm Pocket Books was attempting to fill with inexpensive "mass market" fiction paperbacks. Enoch believed there was an untapped opportunity to publish paperbacks of non-fiction, of more sophisticated fiction, and of the classics.

Enoch suggested to the British publisher Allen Lane that Penguin Books should move from just having an American sales agency for its British publications to setting up as a publisher in the United States. Lane agreed and Penguin Books Inc. was established with Enoch as vice-president and Lane and Ian Ballantine as business partners.

The new firm was profitable but profits were small. At the end of the Second World War Ballantine wanted to take the Penguin Inc. list down-market and compete with mass market publishers like Pocket Books. When he was rebuffed, he left and went to set up Bantam Books, leaving Enoch in charge of Penguin.

Then Allen Lane, unannounced, brought in Victor Weybright to work in an executive role in Penguin Inc. "In fact Weybright had the impression that he was being brought in to run it." After some initial wariness, Enoch and Weybright came to respect each other's talent and work well with each other as partners in Penguin's American branch.

In spite of the firm's increasing success, Lane was not satisfied: he disliked "Enoch's and Weybright's cover pictures and editorial choices" which violated his "more puritanical standards and personal taste" and his desire that Penguin Inc. be a mirror image of Penguin in the United Kingdom.

== New American Library ==
In 1948, after two years of acrimonious relations with Lane, Enoch and Weybright bought out the Penguin equity in the company (except for the Penguin and Pelican trademarks which they surrendered) and renamed it as The New American Library of World Literature (which would be more commonly referred to over the years as the New American Library or NAL in short).

Enoch was president of NAL until 1960. Under his watch it published reprints of literary value, paperback editions of classics, and non-fiction for general readers and for classroom use and a number of prestigious book series including Signet Books, Signet Classics and Mentor Books.

In 1960 Enoch and Weybright sold the New American Library to the Times Mirror Company of Los Angeles. Enoch joined the Times Mirror Board of Directors.

Martin Levin, president of the Association of American Publishers, summed up the achievements of the New American Library under the tutelage of Enoch, as follows:

New American Library was a brilliant concept well ahead of its time. Kurt Enoch brought his special skills to this line of books. He demonstrated that the classics, from Shakespeare to '1984,' and Mickey Spillane, William Styron and James Bond, could all live comfortably on one publishing list. His special pride was that this company flourishes today as it did when he was its first president.

== Life after the NAL ==
After selling NAL, Enoch remained active in public life, supporting the importance reading and publishing.

In 1962 Enoch and five other American booksellers visited the Soviet Union as part of a U.S. State Department cultural exchange program.

He served on the American Book Publishers Council, the National Book Committee and the Franklin Book Program. He wrote numerous articles on the "paperback revolution" and its importance in providing millions of ordinary citizens with access to quality books with tough and independent thinking at a modest and affordable price.

== Retirement ==
In 1967 Enoch retired from the Times Mirror Book Division. In 1968 he opened a business in New York City specializing in publishing.

He died on 15 February 1982 while on holidays in Puerto Rico.

== Personal life ==
Enoch married Hertha Rehse Frischmann in late 1921. They had two daughters, Ruth and Mirjam (later known as Miriam). In 1934 Hertha died from tuberculosis. He married Margaret "Marga" M. Heinemann in early 1937.

He became a naturalized American citizen in 1948. In 2026 his daughter Ruth Gruenthal, a psychotherapist, regained her German citizenship aged 103, citing Trumps reelection and fears of growing authoritarianism.

== Essays and articles by Kurt Enoch ==
- Kurt Enoch, "The Paper-Bound Book: Twentieth-Century Publishing Phenomenon", in: The Library Quarterly, Volume XXIV, July 1954. "An evaluation of the economic organization, editorial problems, and social role of paper-bound publishing. With a list of paperback publishers, and famous authors, important books, anthologies and reference works available in this form."
- Kurt Enoch, contrib., Book Publishing in the U.S.S.R.: reports of the Delegations of U.S. Book Publishers Visiting the U.S.S.R.: October 21-November 4, 1970 [and] August 20-September 17, 1962. Cambridge, Mass.: Harvard Univ. Press, 1971. Delegation of U.S. Book Publishers 1962: Curtis G. Benjamin, Kurt Enoch, Robert W. Frase, Storer B. Lunt, M. R. Robinson, W. B. Wiley. Delegation 1970: Robert L. Bernstein, Mark S. Carroll, Robert W. Frase, Edward J. McCabe Jr., W. Bradford Wiley.
- Kurt Enoch, "Paperback Revolution Described", Austin Statesman, 22 August 1963.
