= Hejmdal - Kræftpatienternes Hus =

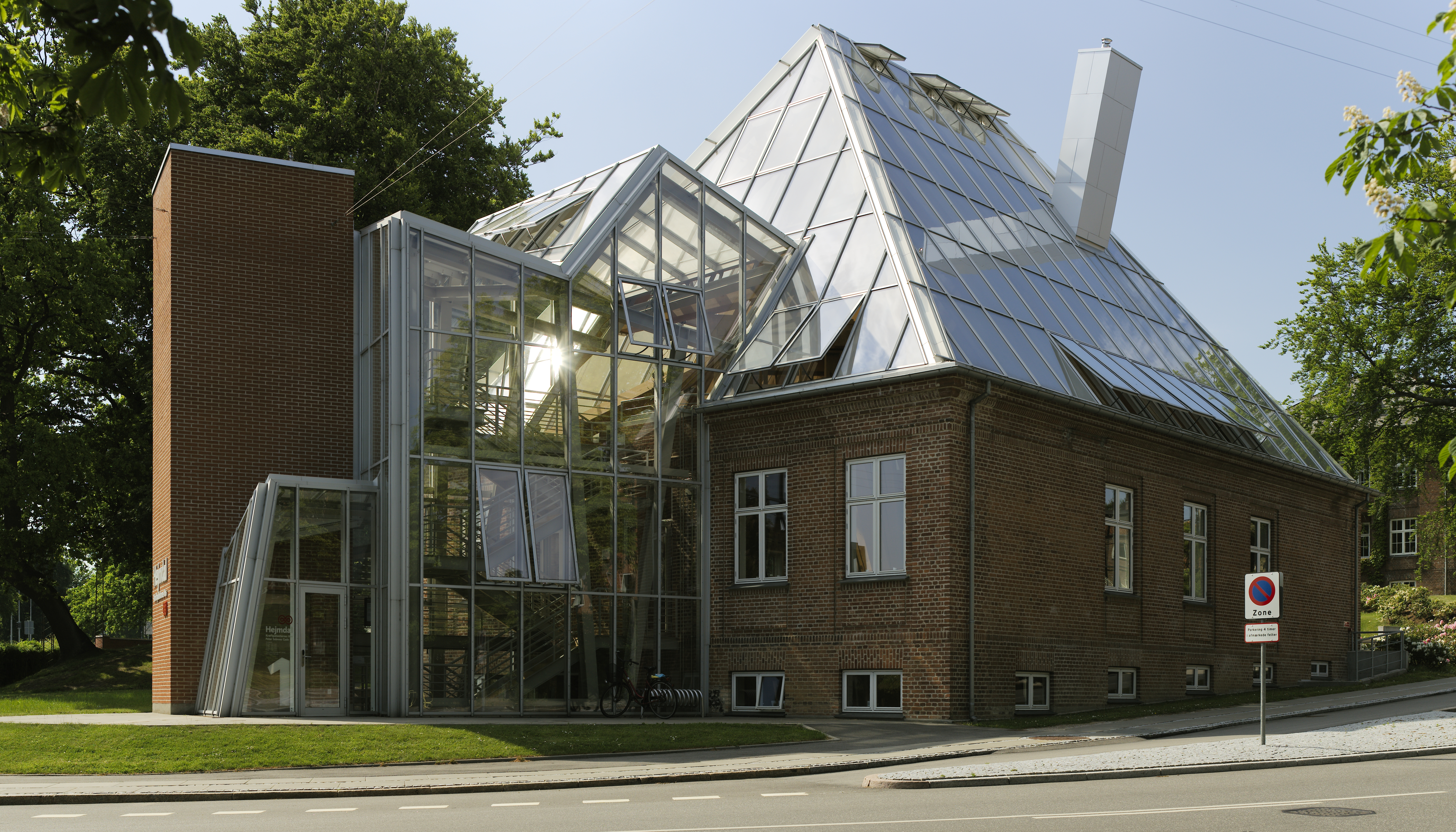
- Hejmdal
- Interactive map of the Hejmdal - Kræftpatienternes Hus area

General information
- Type: Healthcare
- Location: Aarhus, Denmark, Peter Sabroes Gade 1, 8000 Aarhus C
- Coordinates: 56.1656°N 10.2116°E
- Named for: Heimdallr
- Completed: 1908
- Renovated: May 2008

Design and construction
- Architects: Frank Gehry, Cubo Architects

Hejmdal is a facility in Aarhus, Denmark, owned by the Danish Cancer Society and used to counsel and house cancer patients and their families. The building is situated in the Trøjborg neighborhood on Peter Sabroe's Gade 1. Hejmdal was originally a part of Aarhus Municipal Hospital but has since been renovated. The American architect Frank Gehry worked pro bono on the redesign with the architectural company Cubo Architects from Aarhus.

== History ==
The building was originally the home of the porter at Aarhus Municipal Hospital. In 2008, the Danish Cancer Society renovated a facility for cancer counseling and housing cancer patients and their families during treatments. The American architect Frank Gehry and the Aarhus firm Cubo Architects worked on the redesign. Hejmdal is named for the Norse god Heimdallr, god of sunlight and guardian of Bifrost. The house is designed as an open space without boundaries.
