= Easy Edges =

Series of furniture designs by Frank Gehry

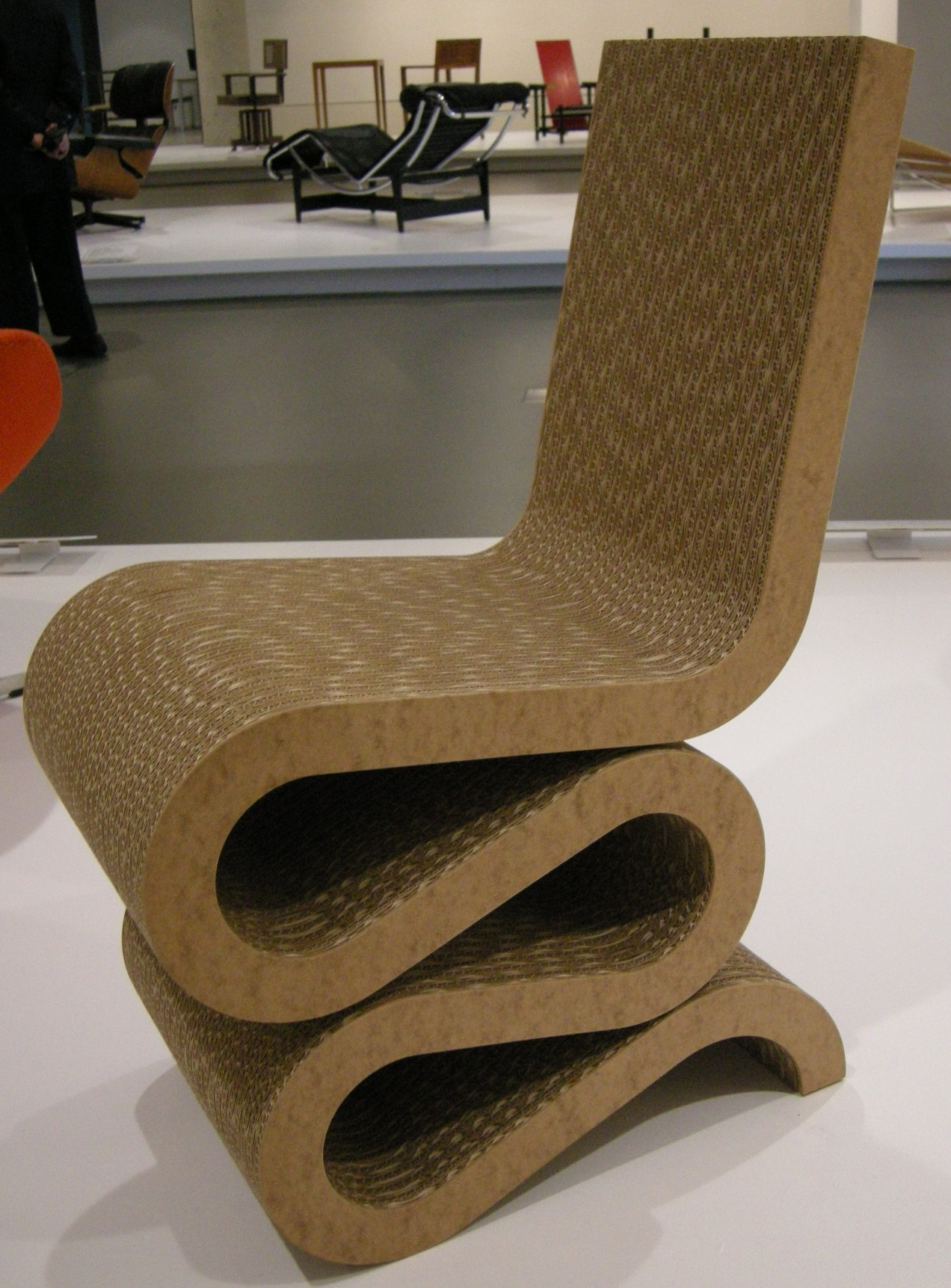
Easy Edges side chair (1972)

Easy Edges is the name given to a series of furniture designs by Frank Gehry from 1969 to 1973. These early designs were partially responsible for Gehry's rise to public recognition in the early 1970s. After discovering that corrugated cardboard layered enough times in alternate directions builds strength into the piece and makes it suitable for everyday use, Gehry created a series of pieces of furniture, such as the "Easy Edges Wiggle Side Chair", that take advantage of the versatility of cardboard as a medium.

== See also ==
- List of works by Frank Gehry
