= Elizabeth Rosner =

American poet

- Born: Schenectady, New York, U.S.
- Occupation: Writer
- Writing career
- Period: 2001–present
- Genres: nonfiction, fiction, essays, poetry
- Notable works: Survivor Cafe: The Legacy of Trauma and the Labyrinth of Memory (2017); Blue Nude (2006)
- Notable awards: National Jewish Book Award (finalist), Prix Femina (shortlist), National Public Radio's Best Books of the Year (2014)
- Website: elizabethrosner.com

Elizabeth Rosner is an American novelist, nonfiction author, essayist, and poet. She is author of three novels and a poetry collection. The Speed of Light was translated into nine languages and won several awards in the US and in Europe, including being shortlisted for the Prix Femina. Blue Nude was named among the best books of 2006 by the San Francisco Chronicle. Electric City was named among the best books of 2014 by NPR.

The daughter of Holocaust survivors, in 2017 Rosner published her first book of nonfiction: Survivor Cafe: The Legacy of Trauma and the Labyrinth of Memory, an examination of inter-generational dynamics in the wake of surviving tragedy. The San Francisco Chronicle notes that "“Survivor Café — which combines moving personal narrative with illuminating research into the impact of mass trauma on a personal and cultural scale — feels like the book Rosner was born to write. Each page is imbued with urgency, with sincerity, with heartache, with heart." The book was a finalist for the National Jewish Book Award.

Her essays and reviews have appeared in the New York Times Magazine, Elle, the San Francisco Chronicle and others. She lives in Berkeley, California.

== Published works ==
=== Non-fiction ===
- Survivor Café (Counterpoint Press, 2017), San Francisco Chronicle best book of the year; Finalist for National Jewish Book Award in Contemporary Jewish Life & Practice

=== Novels ===
- The Speed of Light (Ballantine Books, 2001)
- Blue Nude (Gallery Books, 2010)
- Electric City (Counterpoint Press, 2014)

=== Poetry collections ===
- Gravity (Atelier 26 Books)
