= Gehry Tower =

Building in Hanover, Germany

Coordinates: 52°22′29″N 9°43′50″E

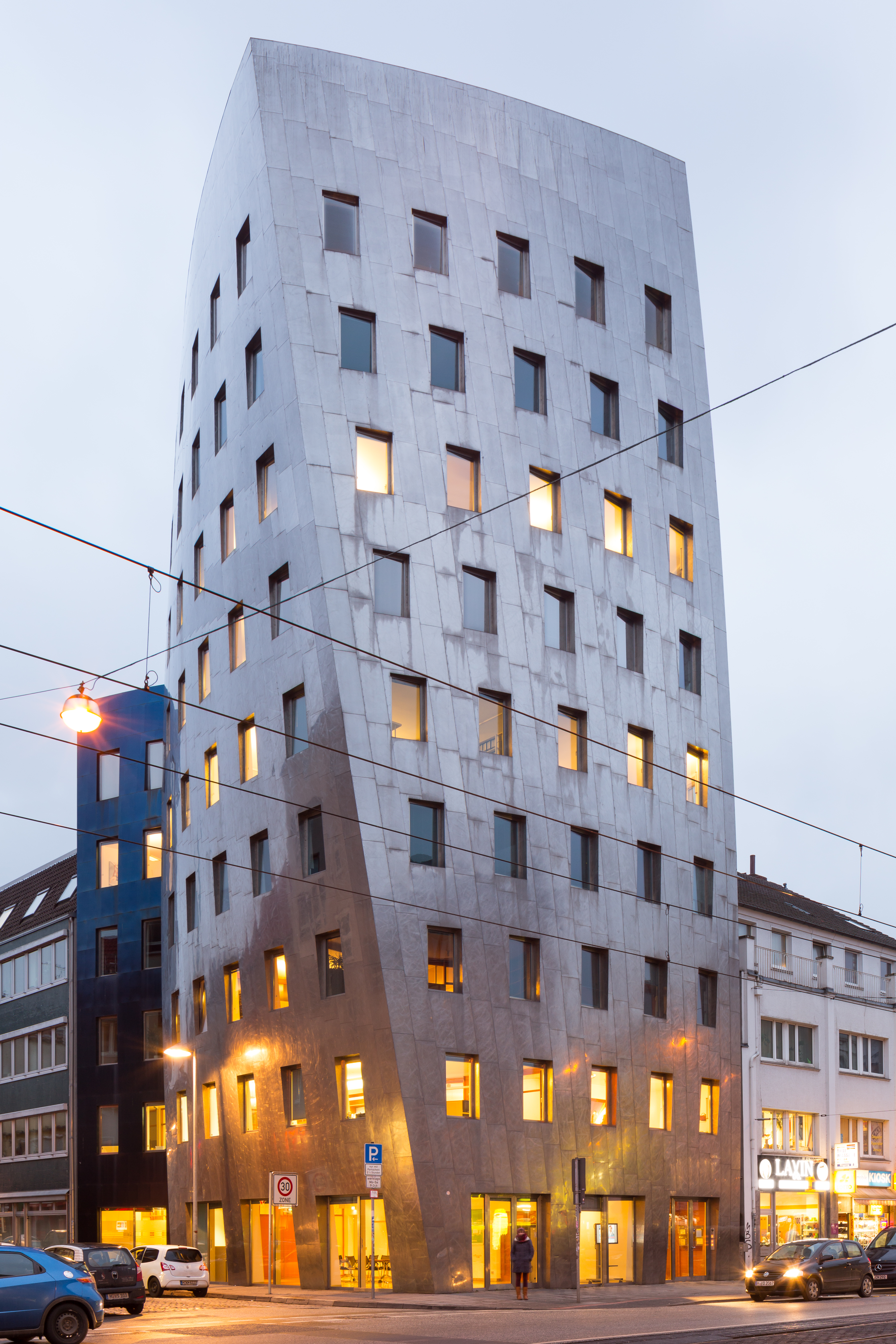
Gehry Tower

Gehry Tower is a nine-story building constructed by architect Frank Gehry; it is located at the Steintor, Goethestraße 13a, in Hanover, Germany. The building was commissioned by the city-owned Hanover Transport Services (üstra), for whom Gehry also designed a bus stop in the city.

Constructed of stainless steel, the tower is memorable for the noticeable twist in its outer façade on a ferroconcrete core, making optimal use of the relatively small piece of ground on which it is located. Like many of Gehry's buildings, the tower was created with the most modern technology available at the time. Gehry's office first created a 1:100 model, which was then scanned and imported into CAD software to be able to compute the dimensions for the individual parts, all of which vary in size and shape.

Construction began in 1999, cost 8.5 million Deutsche Mark, and the building officially opened 28 June 2001.

== See also ==
- List of works by Frank Gehry
