= Victor Weybright =

American writer and publisher

Victor Weybright (1903-1978) was an American writer and publisher.

He was educated at Hull House and the University of Chicago.

During World War II he worked in London for the United States Office of War Information.

After the war Weybright was brought in by Allen Lane, head of the British publishing firm Penguin Books, to help Kurt Enoch run its American branch, Penguin Books Inc.

In 1948 together with Enoch he co-founded the publishing company New American Library. After retiring from NAL in 1966, he started the trade publisher Weybright & Talley in partnership with his stepson.

He travelled with gypsies and founded the North American chapter of the Gypsy Lore Society.

He wrote short stories for pulp magazines such as Adventure.

His hobbies included blacksmithing.
