= Spinner rack =

Rotating merchandise display

A spinner rack is a rotating merchandise display, usually placed on a retailer's floor or counter. Often used to display magazines, paperbacks, greeting cards, postcards, hats, or seeds, the spinner rack is closely associated with the comic book industry.

A typical spinner rack is composed of a metal central spine with wire pockets, baskets, or pegs. A floor unit may have between four and twelve tiers (usually with four pockets on each tier) that may or may not rotate independently. Additional features may include a signholder that sits on top of the unit. (A typical comics spinner rack would have 44 pockets, with each pocket holding around five comics.)

Author George R. R. Martin, in writing about the spinner racks he knew as a child, notes that they offered a hodge-podge of titles (in his case paperbacks) regardless of genre, and thus exposed readers to a wide variety of writing, as opposed to the modern bookstore, where books are generally categorized by topic.

== History ==
Up until the mid-1980s, comics spinner racks were a common feature of American and British newsstands, pharmacies, grocery stores, and variety stores. As comics historian John Jackson Miller writes:

...the cold retailing history was that the spinner rack was originally developed not as a showcase, but as a response to 20th-century newsstands and grocers who found comics unprofitable and undesirable, and who wanted them off their magazine shelves. Sticking them all onto a standing rack allowed newsstand owners to stick them off into a corner.... In practice, of course, comics fans followed the books there, with many developing a fondness for the displays — enough so that the "Hey Kids! Comics!" label atop spinners became a slogan reclaimed by fans.

With the growth of the direct market and comic book specialty stores, comics — and spinner racks — mostly disappeared from the old venues, to the point that they mostly became a thing of the past. Spinner racks also suffered in reputation because, as The Thought Balloon blog notes, they:

"...typically exposed comic books to potential physical damage by virtue of how they display them. Potential customers would often bend comics to see what was behind them, thus causing stress lines on the cover that can be quite noticeable, and if they pulled out a comic book and then decided against buying it, it often went back into the spinner rack without much care, resulting in tatty corners and edges and even torn covers and pages.

Despite this, a few companies, like Tokyopop, were known to offer retailers free spinner rack displays for Tokyopop manga, thereby increasing the visibility of the medium in bookstores.

In the years 2018–2019, however, nostalgia for comic book spinner racks (Note: See, for instance, Awesome: The Indie Spinner Rack Anthology (Evil Twin Comics, 2007), ISBN 1-6030-9039-8.) motivated some manufacturers to offer them again, both for stores, conventions, and for individual collectors to keep in their homes. Diamond Comic Distributors, in announcing that it was now offering spinner racks for sale, posits them as a way to bring comics back to the "book, record, toy, or game store around the corner, the hospital gift shop down the street, drug stores, convenience stores, movie theaters," as a way of expanding comics distribution once again beyond the comic specialty shop.
