= Albatross Books =

German publishing house

- Founded: 1932
- Founder: John Holroyd-Reece, Max Christian Wegner and Kurt Enoch
- Country of origin: Germany
- Headquarters location: Hamburg
- Fiction genres: Mass-market paperbacks
- Imprints: Tauchnitz

Albatross Books (or Albatross Press) was a German publishing house based in Hamburg that produced the first modern mass-market paperback books.

Albatross was founded in 1932 by John Holroyd-Reece, Max Christian Wegner and Kurt Enoch. The name was chosen because albatross is the same word in many European languages. Based on the example of Tauchnitz, a Leipzig publishing firm that had been producing inexpensive and paper-bound English-language reprints for the continental market, Albatross set out to streamline and modernize the paperback format.

The books in the series were produced with a layout designed by Giovanni Mardersteig, then art director at the Mondadori Italian publishing house, including a new standard size, 181 x 111 mm, which approximated the aesthetically pleasing proportions known as the Golden Ratio. They used new sans-serif fonts developed by Stanley Morison among others, and were color-coded by genre, with green for travel, orange for humor and satire, and so on. The series was so successful that Albatross soon purchased Tauchnitz, giving itself an instant 100-year heritage.

Albatross Books launched two book series, the Albatross Crime Club and the Albatross Mystery Club.

The outbreak of World War II brought the Albatross experiment to a halt, but by then Allen Lane had adopted many of Albatross' ideas, including the standard size, the idea of covers using typography and logo but no illustrations, and the use of color coding by type of content, for Penguin Books. Lane later hired Kurt Enoch, co-founder of Albatross Books, to manage Penguin's American branch.

The Albatross series inspired similar series in other countries as well, such as the Salamander series (Querido) in the Netherlands.
