= Simms and McIntyre =

19th century Irish printing and publishing house

Simms & McIntyre
- Status: Defunct
- Founded: 1806
- Founder: David Simms and George L. M'Intyre
- Successor: James M'Intyre and James Simms
- Country of origin: United Kingdom
- Headquarters location: Belfast
- Publication types: Fiction reprint series, schoolbooks

Simms and McIntyre (commonly referred to as "Simms & McIntyre" and sometimes as "Simms & M'Intyre") was a 19th century printing and publishing company from Belfast, Ireland. The company published The Parlour Library, an innovative book series of cheap reprints of titles in attractive physical formats and sold at very low prices, both of which features which were later imitated by other publishers.

== Company history ==
Simms & McIntyre was founded in Belfast, Ireland in December 1806 by David Simms, a bookseller and stationer, and George L. M'Intyre, who had previously worked for I. Warren, a Belfast bookseller and circulating library firm.

For more than sixty years the company operated from various premises in North, High and Donegal Streets, Belfast. In the years 1844-58 it also had an office at 13 Paternoster Row, London.

In its early days the company published a wide variety of material but had a "strong emphasis" on the schoolbook market. In the 1820s it published a literary reprint series, the first of several it would issue over the next two decades.

M'Intyre died in 1834 and Simms died in 1841. Their successors in the company were their sons, James M'Intyre and James Simms. In 1841, in its first commercial venture in England, the company printed a dictionary for William Milner of Halifax and in the following year it published its first book with the places of publication listed as "London and Belfast". In February 1846 it launched the Parlour Novelist series and in the following year The Parlour Library series.

Other book series published included the Parlour Library of Instruction (1849), the Parlour Book Case (1852) and Books for the People (1852).

After 1853 Simms & McIntyre continued to publish schoolbooks. From 1858 the company stopped publishing in London and moved back to Belfast. It ceased trading in 1870.

== The Parlour Library ==
After British railway newsagent's shops began successfully selling to travelers what The Times described as "French novels, unfortunately, of questionable character", the Parlour Library launched in March 1847. It has been described as the "first successful series of fiction reprints in paper boards". The first title was William Carleton's Black Prophet and this was followed in rapid succession by reprints of works by such authors as Alexandre Dumas, George Sand, Frederick Marryat, and Jane Austen as well as other popular authors of the day such as G. P. R. James. The series was advertised as "one of the boldest speculations that has ever been made in the history of bookselling", and was very successful. Each volume had a distinctive glazed decorative green cover and was priced at 1s. (one shilling) in boards or 1s. 6d. in cloth. The series prompted an "unprecedented" demand for "cheap, attractively packaged new and popular novels". The series' format and volume was "revolutionary" at a time when the "average new novel came out in three volumes at 31s. 6d." and when books in even cheap reprint series like Colburn's Modern Standard Novelists were priced at "6s. each".

Unlike the drab covers of earlier reprint and penny series, The Parlour Library used colour, specifically in the glazed green covers of its titles, which "resembled the brightly coloured gift books of the 1820s", to make the titles stand out and gave the series a brand identity. Early editions of George Routledge's Railway Library would mimic Parlour's green covers and thousands of yellowbacks published in the second half of the 19th century similarly featured brightly coloured covers, marketing their contents as entertaining reading for the new classes of reader of that era. The Times surmised that "persons of the better class, who constitute the larger portion of railway readers, lose their accustomed taste the moment they smell the engine and present themselves to the railway librarian".

In 1853 the company sold the series to its London agent, Thomas Hodgson, who continued to publish the series, and the series continued to be published by a number of other London publishers (Darton & Co.; C. H. Clarke; Darton & Hodge; and Weldon & Co.) until the 1870s.
