= Betty Ballantine =

American editor and publisher (1919–2019)

- Born: Elizabeth Jones; September 25, 1919; Faizabad, British India
- Died: February 12, 2019 (aged 99); Bearsville, New York, U.S.
- Occupations: Publisher, editor, writer
- Known for: Bantam Books
- Spouse: Ian Ballantine
- Children: Richard Ballantine

Betty Ballantine (born Elizabeth Jones; September 25, 1919 – February 12, 2019) was an American publisher, editor, and writer. She was born during the Raj to a British colonial family in Faizabad, India. After her marriage to Ian Ballantine in 1939, she moved to New York. Their son, Richard, was an author and journalist specializing in cycling topics.

== Business ==
After moving to New York, the couple first ran the Penguin U.S.A. operation. As a team, the Ballantines were involved in the formation of Bantam Books in 1945. Ian became the president from 1945 to 1952 when the pair left to form Ballantine Books.

The new publishing house operated with a new business concept, producing original fiction and publishing both hardbound and paperbound copies at the same time. Some originals included Fahrenheit 451 and A Clockwork Orange. They also published reprints. During the 1960s, they published the first authorized paperback edition of J. R. R. Tolkien's books. Betty Ballantine worked on the editorial part of the business. Along with Frederik Pohl, she searched for science fiction writers in magazines and encouraged them to write novels for Ballantine Books. Irwyn Applebaum, former president of Bantam Dell Publishing Group, said “...much of the editorial vision and brilliance, from variety to quality, that Bantam and Ballantine were known for were due to Betty. Ian was the proselytizer for their brand of books, but Betty was the identifier, the nurturer, the editor.” She was also the force behind The Ballantine Adult Fantasy Series, the first paperbacks in the fantasy genre to be directed toward adults. Authors in this series included Lord Dunsany, H.P. Lovecraft, and Clark Ashton Smith.

They sold the business in 1974 to Random House.

== Awards ==
Ian and Betty Ballantine won one special World Fantasy Award for professional work in 1975 and an additional one shared with Joy Chant and other creators of The High Kings (Bantam, 1983), a reference book on the Matter of Britain that incorporates retellings. It was also a runner-up in nonfiction Hugo and Locus Award categories. Betty Ballantine received a Special Committee Award from the annual World Science Fiction Convention in 2006 and a World Fantasy Award for Life Achievement from the World Fantasy Convention in 2007. The Ballantines were both inducted by the Science Fiction Hall of Fame in 2008, with a shared citation.

== Publications ==
Ballantine wrote the novel The Secret Oceans, published by Bantam in 1994 (ISBN 0553096605) with illustrations by twelve artists.
