= Cubo Architects =

Danish architectural firm

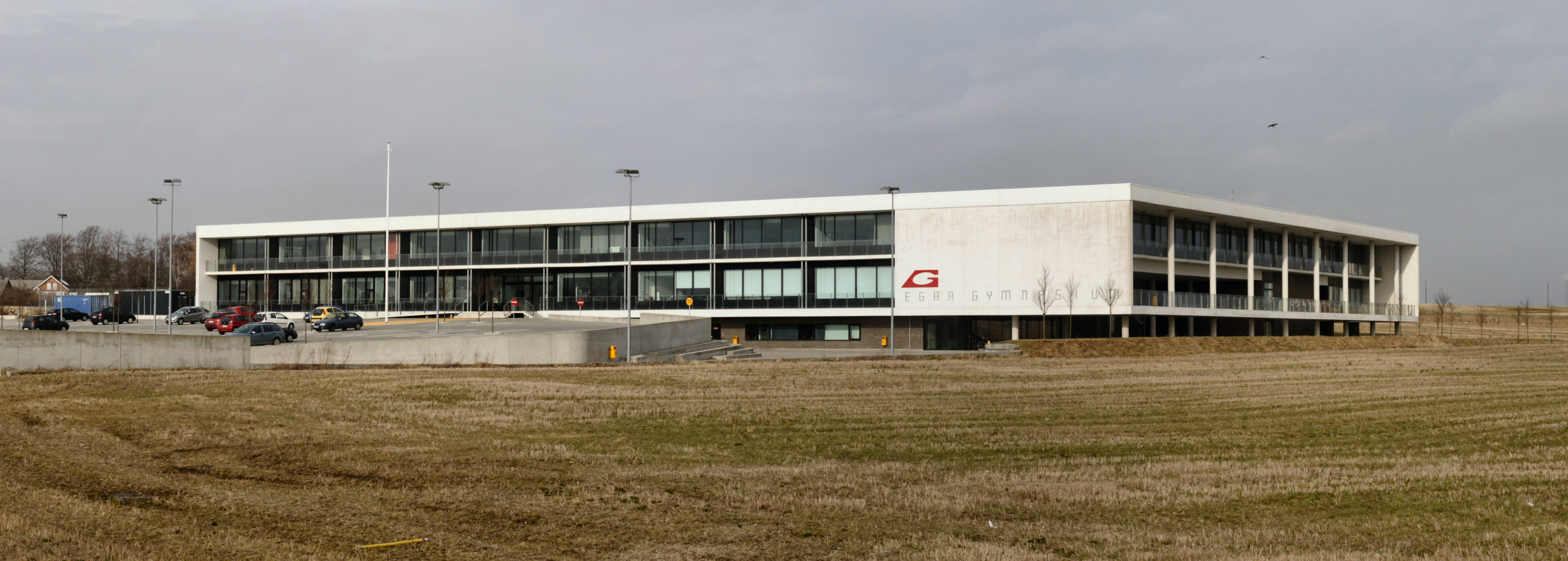
- Egå Gymnasium

Practice information
- Founders: Peter Dalsgaard; Bo Lautrup; Ib Valdemar Nielsen; Lars Juel Thiis
- Founded: 1992
- Location: Aarhus

Cubo Architects is a Danish architectural practice located in Aarhus. The company was founded in 1992.

== Selected projects ==
- 1996 Transportcenter, Hørning
- 1998 Faculty for Health Sciences, University of Southern Denmark, Odense
- 2000 Jysk store, Brabrand, Aarhus
- 2002 Hanstholm fortress Museum
- 2003 Egaa Gymnasium, Aarhus

== Projects ==
- Bergen University College, Bergen, Norway
- Business Academy Aarhus
- Technical University of Denmark
- University of Southern Denmark, Odense
- Aarhus University Hospital, Aarhus, in collaboration with C. F. Møller Architects
