= Yellow-back =

Cheap novel published in Britain in the 19th century

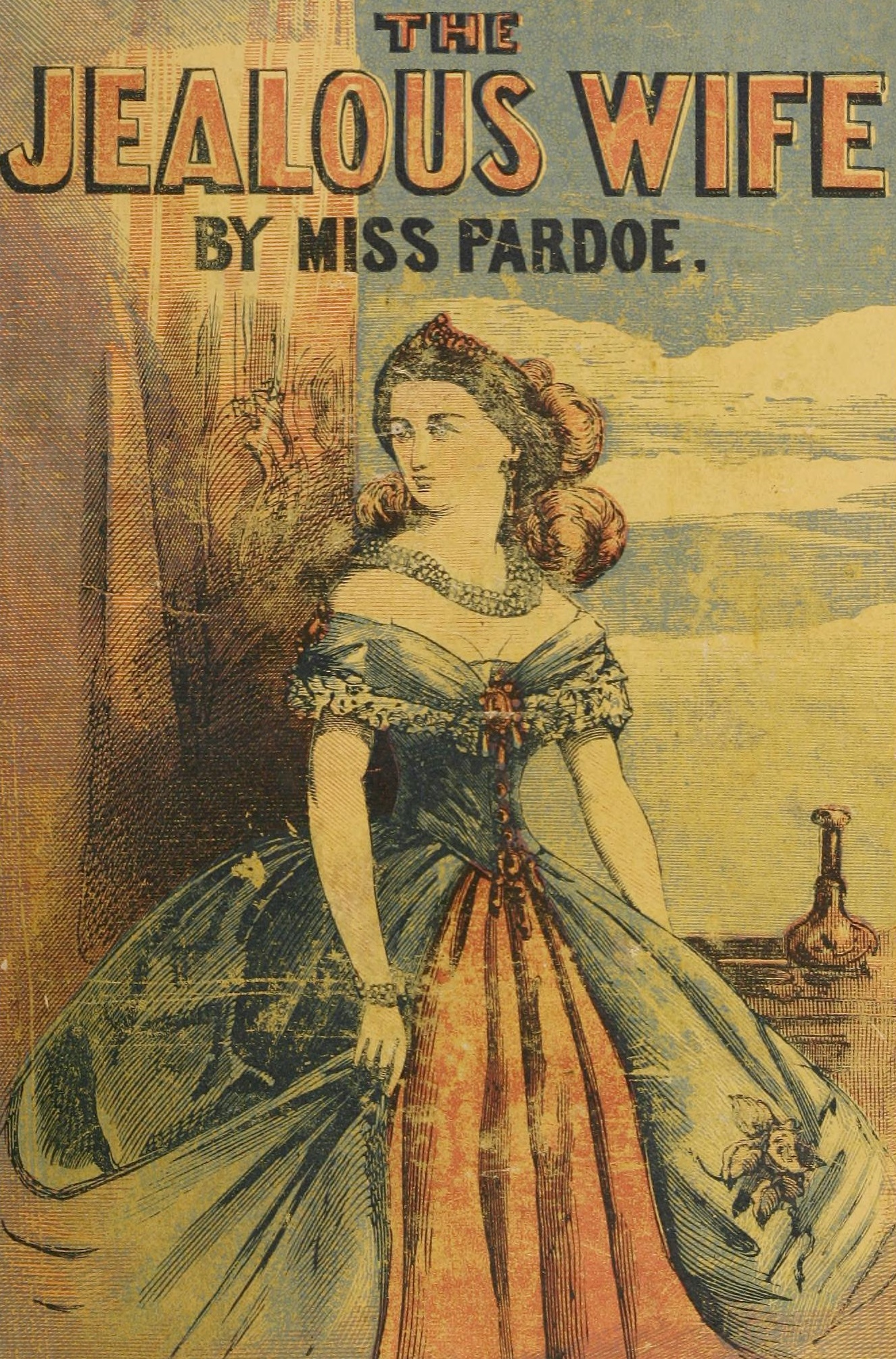
Cover of The Jealous Wife (1865) by Julia Pardoe

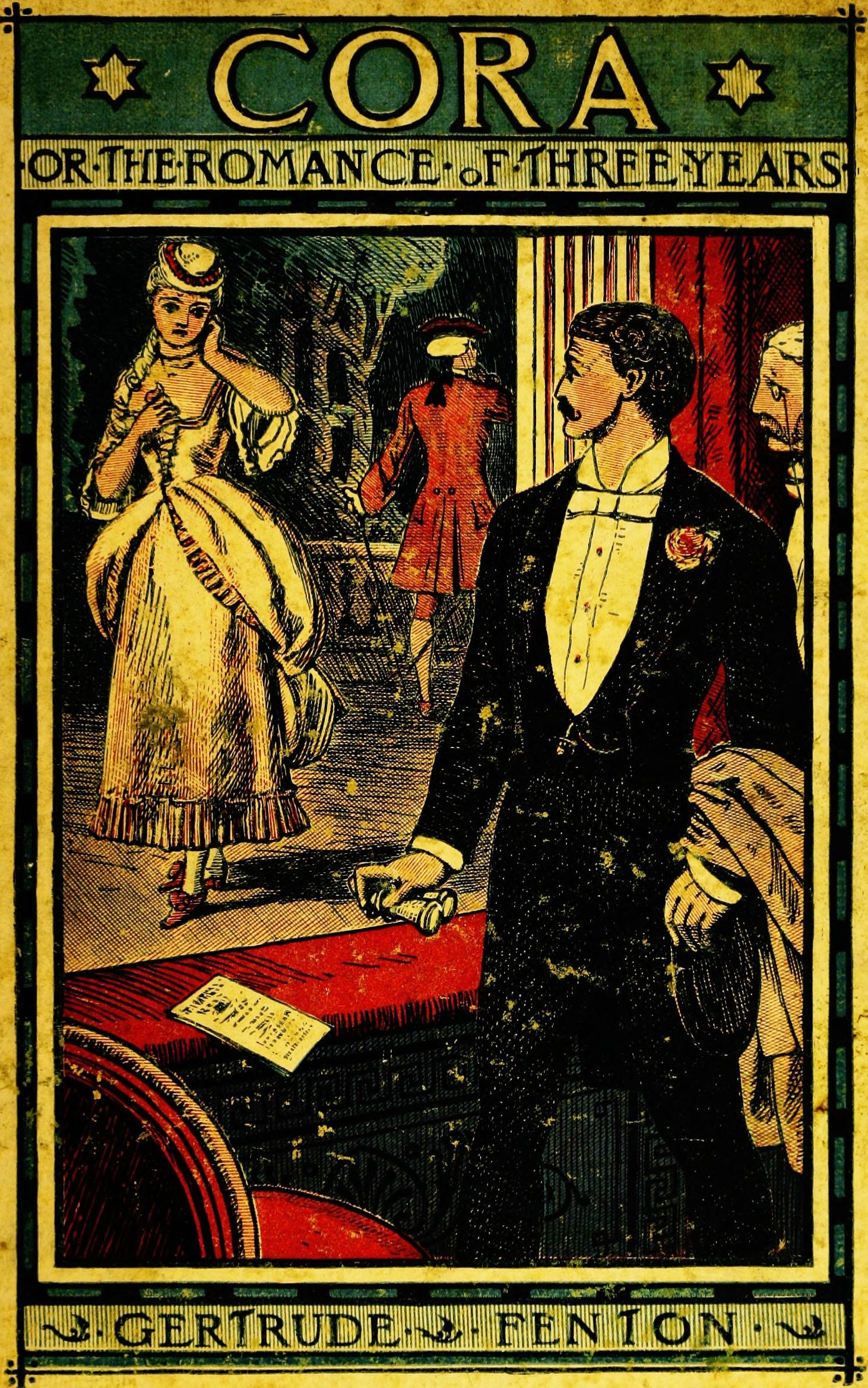
Cover of Cora: Or, The Romance of Three Years (1869) by Gertrude Fenton

A yellow-back or yellowback is a cheap novel which was published in Britain in the second half of the 19th century. They were occasionally called "mustard-plaster" novels.

Developed in the 1840s to compete with the "penny dreadful", yellow-backs were marketed as entertaining reading. They had brightly coloured covers, often printed by chromoxylography, that were attractive to a new class of readers, thanks to the spread of education and rail travel.

Routledge was one of the first publishers to begin marketing yellow-backs by starting their "Railway Library" in 1848. The series included 1,277 titles, published over 50 years. These mainly consisted of stereotyped reprints of novels originally published as cloth editions. By the late 19th century, yellow-backs included sensational fiction, adventure stories, "educational" manuals, handbooks, and cheap biographies.

Two typical examples of authors of yellow-backs include James Grant and Robert Louis Stevenson.

The color yellow is similarly associated with fast-paced crime thrillers in Italy, where the word for "crime story" is giallo even nowadays.

== See also ==
- Airport novel
- Sensation novel
- Kibyōshi (lit. 'yellow cover') – a genre of Japanese humorous picture books published in 18th - 19th century
