= Harvey Kurtzman's Jungle Book =

1959 satirical graphic novel

Cover to the original 1959 edition of Harvey Kurtzman's Jungle Book, Ballantine Books, 140 pages, 1959

Harvey Kurtzman's Jungle Book is a graphic novel by American cartoonist Harvey Kurtzman, published in 1959. Kurtzman aimed it at an adult audience, in contrast to his earlier work for adolescents in periodicals such as Mad. The social satire in the book's four stories targets Peter Gunn-style private-detective shows, Westerns such as Gunsmoke, capitalist avarice in the publishing industry, Freudian pop psychology, and lynch-hungry yokels in the South. Kurtzman's character Goodman Beaver makes his first appearance in one of the stories.

Kurtzman created the satirical Mad in 1952, but left its publisher EC Comics in 1956 after a dispute over financial control. After two failed attempts with similar publications, Kurtzman proposed Jungle Book as an all-original cartoon book to Ballantine Books to replace its successful series of Mad collections, which had moved to another publisher, Signet Books. Ballantine accepted Kurtzman's proposal, albeit with reservations about its commercial viability. It was the first mass-market paperback of original comics published in the United States. Though it was not a financial success, Jungle Book attracted fans and critics for its brushwork, satirical adult-oriented humor, experimental dialogue balloons, and adventurous page and panel designs.

== Contents ==
The full title of the book is Harvey Kurtzman's Jungle Book: Or, Up from the Apes! (and Right Back Down)—In Which Are Described in Words and Pictures Businessmen, Private Eyes, Cowboys, and Other Heros All Exhibiting the Progress of Man from the Darkness of the Cave into the Light of Civilization by Means of Television, Wide Screen Movies, the Stone Axe, and Other Useful Arts. At 140 pages, Jungle Book is Kurtzman's longest solo work. Freed from the length constraints of magazine pieces, Kurtzman was able to make inventive use of page and panel rhythms. According to critic and publisher Kim Thompson, his satire never had "more pitiless a bite" at any other time in his career. Kurtzman had aimed his Mad stories at an adolescent audience; his targeting Jungle Book at an adult audience was uncommon in American comics.

Four stories make up the book:

=== "Thelonius Violence, Like Private Eye" ===
Thelonius Violence speaks in jazz slang while surrounded by beautiful women and jazz background music, which was a parody of the jazz-choreographed fight scenes in the Peter Gunn television series. Violence's job is to protect a young, vapid woman named Lolita Nabokov who is being blackmailed over her exam cheating. Violence suffers the onslaughts of a thug who attempts to keep him away from the young woman, but in the end it is revealed that the thug and Violence are partners in her extortion.

In his parody, Kurtzman retained little from the original Peter Gunn aside from the main character. Kurtzman stated he "was trying to get ... that Henry Mancini feel to the story". "Thelonius Violence" appears first in the book, but was one of the last stories to be completed. It remained a favorite of Kurtzman's, as he "had control of this story. The action and line are good. It took time and practice and effort to get it, but it's there."

=== "The Organization Man in the Gray Flannel Executive Suit" ===
Goodman Beaver is an editor hired by Schlock Publications Inc. During his time there, he loses his youthful idealism and succumbs to the corruption he finds in the publishing world. Goodman finds himself sexually harassing the secretaries, just as the other cynical executives at Schlock do, and ends up stealing from the company.

Goodman Beaver was a stand-in for Kurtzman himself in this semi-autobiographical tale. At this point in his career, Kurtzman had had several negative experiences with publishers, and he used this story to satirize the corrupting influence of capitalism and power. Kurtzman's memories of his time at Timely Comics were a strong influence on the Schlock Publications he portrayed; Timely publisher Martin Goodman was Kurtzman's model for the publisher in the story. Kurtzman also used Burt Lancaster as his model for the editor of the men's magazine in the story, and Hugh Hefner was his model for the editor of the "girlie" magazine. As Goodman Beaver did in the story, early in his career Kurtzman worked making crossword puzzles for Goodman. The title is an amalgamation of three bestselling 1950s novels: Executive Suite (1952) by Cameron Hawley, The Man in the Gray Flannel Suit (1955) by Sloan Wilson, and The Organization Man (1956) by William H. Whyte.

=== "Compulsion on the Range" ===
"Compulsion on the Range" is a satire that blends Westerns and Freudian pop psychology. In the 1950s, a trend of "adult" Westerns appeared in which characters were given psychological backgrounds to explain their motivations, as in The Left Handed Gun, in which an angst-ridden Billy the Kid gets his revenge after losing his father figure. In "Compulsion", a psychologist tries to work out why Marshall Matt Dolin (a parody of James Arness as Marshal Matt Dillon from the popular Gunsmoke TV show) insists on trying to outshoot Johnny Ringding, chasing him across the West.

"Compulsion" was the third story in the book, but the first to be drawn, and was Kurtzman's least favorite, as he thought he had yet to perfect the style he had developed for the book. The story recycled ideas from a Kurtzman strip called "Endings to End the Fast Draw" that TV Guide had rejected in 1958.

=== "Decadence Degenerated" ===
Panels that inspired Art Spiegelman in the way Kurtzman experimented with formalities such as the portrayal of motion

One of Kurtzman's favorites, "Decadence Degenerated" is set in a town in the Deep South called Rottenville, where nothing happens until local beauty Honey Lou is found murdered. A quiet bookworm named Si Mednick is lynched for the murder because, as one of the yokels declares, "You cain not truss [sic] (Note: That is "cannot trust" in Kurtzman's imitation of a Southern drawl.) a man who reads!" The town sheriff overlooks the lynching, despite the presence of a "Northern" reporter—actually from the northern part of the state.

At the time the story appeared, Hollywood was releasing adaptations of works set in the South by writers such as Tennessee Williams and William Faulkner. Kurtzman said his inspiration came from his memories of Paris, Texas, where he was stationed during World War II. He learned the Southern drawl used in the story from what he heard at United Service Organizations (USO) dances. He recalled, "I just wanted a parody of that town. I worked from memory." The scene in which the unemployed townsmen mentally undress Honey Lou affected Art Spiegelman, who saw the possibilities of the comics medium in the formalities of the scene's portrayal of motion.

== Style and themes ==
The black-and-white art is in loose, fluid, and sketchy brushwork with a gray wash. The drawings are in an exaggerated cartoon style, with rounded, fluid, elongated figures. The rendering is simple and clean, and faces often have mere circles for eyes. Most of the women lack noses except when drawn in profile. Kurtzman blends the verbal and visual aspects of the work—for example, when an enraged Goodman Beaver confronts his diminutive boss Mr. Schlock, Goodman is graphically overwhelmed by Schlock's word balloons, which demonstrates Goodman's helpless subservience and Schlock's effortless psychological dominance over his employees.

Kurtzman lettered the dialogue in an expressive, handwriting-like style. Unlike as in the majority of American comic books, Kurtzman did not letter using all capitals. His tall and thin dialogue balloons necessitated frequent hyphenation, which makes the dialogue more difficult to read. Kurtzman experimented with drawing on blue-lined paper; the blue lines were not supposed to reproduce visibly when the book was printed, but the gray wash Kurtzman used unintentionally reinforced them.

Kurtzman used a wash in the artwork, unintentionally bringing out the blue lines on the paper that were supposed to be invisible when printed.

Kurtzman used the book to lampoon humankind's inability or incompetence, its failure to reach its supposed aspirations, and its self-delusion. He also targeted middlebrow entertainment, deflating its pretensions. The women in the stories are extraordinarily curvaceous and are frequently objectified—although the character Sam in "Decadence Degenerated" avoids being ogled or groped, it is only because she is depicted as repulsive.

== Publication ==
Kurtzman founded the satirical Mad at EC Comics as a color comic book in 1952, and turned it into a black-and-white comics magazine in 1955. In 1956, Kurtzman left over a dispute with EC Comics publisher William Gaines about financial control. Kurtzman tried his hand at another magazine in 1957 with the financial backing of Hugh Hefner. The result, Trump, was slick and lavish, and lasted only two issues before Hefner canceled it. Kurtzman then co-founded and co-published Humbug along with a group of Mad and Trump artists. In 1958, after eleven unprofitable issues, Humbug also came to an end. Kurtzman was left disillusioned and cynical about the business end of publishing, and with a wife, three children, and a mortgage to take care of, was struggling financially.

While still at EC, Kurtzman had overseen the first five Mad pocket books (Note: Ballantine's line of Mad books was edited by E. L. Doctorow.) published by Ballantine Books, which became perennial sellers with sales in the millions. When Kurtzman left EC, his royalties from the books ceased and Gaines had Kurtzman's name removed from them. In 1958 Gaines abandoned Ballantine for Signet Books. Kurtzman proposed an original paperback to Ian Ballantine, who was looking for something to replace the Mad line. Kurtzman was well respected at the Ballantine offices, and it was editor Bernard Shir-Cliff who provided Kurtzman with the postcard of the gap-toothed character that was to become Mad's mascot Alfred E. Neuman. Ballantine had earlier published The Humbug Digest in the same format with material culled from Kurtzman's Humbug magazine, though it fared poorly in the market.

Rather than reprint material cut-and-pasted to fit the narrow pages of the paperback format as had been done with Ballantine's Mad books, Kurtzman wanted to create new material designed to fit the page dimensions. Ballantine accepted Kurtzman's proposal on faith, but he had reservations. He suspected it was the Mad brand name that sold books rather than Kurtzman's name, although the artist had been the creative force behind Mad. In January Kurtzman signed a contract with Ballantine that came with an advance of $1500 with a 4% royalty per copy sold; the deadline was 144 pages by May 1, 1959. The contracted book was to be called Pleasure Package, for which Kurtzman mocked up a cover, but appeared as Harvey Kurtzman's Jungle Book.

When it was published in September 1959, Jungle Book was the first mass-market paperback of original comics content in the United States. The 35¢ book had small dimensions at 4 1/4 × 7 inches (11 × 18 cm) and was poorly printed onto low-quality paper. Ballantine printed 150000 copies for the book's first run, a low number for the company. Jungle Book sold poorly; after five years and despite an offer of copies with subscriptions to Kurtzman's Help! magazine only 78000 copies had sold—for Ballantine to break even 107000 copies would have to have been sold. Ballantine pulped the remaining copies, and Kurtzman and the company's relationship came to an end.

Kurtzman lamented the book's poor sales as he said he "truly liked the format". He had been developing at least one other story, a science-fiction parody, but abandoned it after two pages. If Jungle Book had been a market success, Kurtzman had intended to continue producing books in the format. He reprinted "Decadence Degenerated" in the second issue of Help!, a magazine he edited in the 1960s. "Compulsion on the Range" was reprinted in the underground comic book Yellow Dog #15 in 1969.

Kitchen Sink Press reprinted Jungle Book in 1986 in a deluxe hardcover format (Note: Kitchen Sink released a softcover edition in 1988.) with the pages reproduced at the size in which they were drawn. The reprinting includes an introduction by Art Spiegelman.

Dark Horse Comics published Harvey’s Kurtzman’s Jungle Book in 2014 as the first volume of its Essential Kurtzman series. (Note: The volume was nominated for Special Award for Excellence in Presentation at the 2015 Harvey Awards.) Under the Kitchen Sink Books imprint, this volume was edited and designed by John Lind; it includes a new content including an essay by Kitchen, a foreword by cartoonist Gilbert Shelton, and an interview with cartoonists Robert Crumb and Peter Poplaski about the book. The French translation of this edition, which included a new introduction by Georges Wolinski, was awarded a "Heritage Selection" at the 2018 Angoulême International Comics Festival.

== Reception and legacy ==
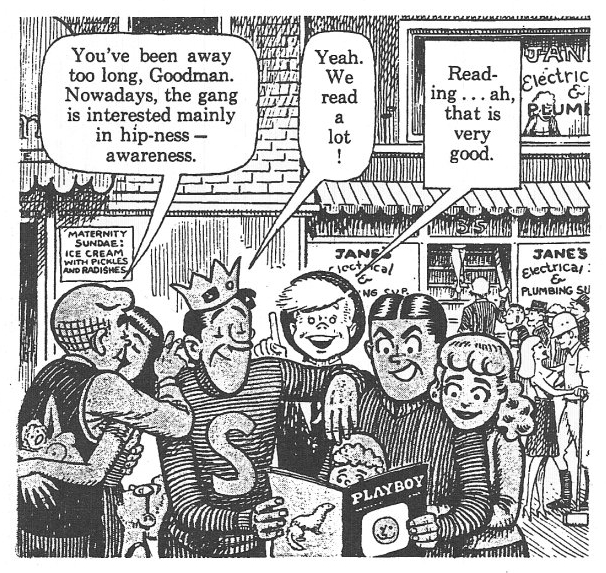
Kurtzman continued with Goodman Beaver in a series of stories drawn by Will Elder in the magazine Help! in the early 1960s.

Jungle Book sold poorly, but developed a fan following and became a collector's item. Admirers included pioneering underground cartoonists such as Joel Beck, Denis Kitchen, Jay Lynch, Spain Rodriguez, Gilbert Shelton, Art Spiegelman, Skip Williamson, and Robert Crumb, who wrote "[s]ome of [Kurtzman's] greatest stuff was done in a little Ballantine Book called Harvey Kurtzman's Jungle Book". Goodman Beaver later appeared in a series of stories drawn by Will Elder in Kurtzman's Help!, and Kurtzman and Elder later adapted the strip into Little Annie Fanny in Playboy magazine.

Biographers Denis Kitchen and Paul Buhle see the book as a precursor of the graphic novel. In 1962, Kurtzman made another aborted attempt at this form with Marley's Ghost, an adaptation of A Christmas Carol by Charles Dickens, a project he had conceived in 1954. He finished seven of the project's projected 100 pages, and had long-time collaborator Jack Davis reinterpret one of the pages as part of the proposal. The project failed to interest a publisher. Graphic novels did not start to become widespread until 1978, a year which saw the publication of McGregor and Gulacy's Sabre and Eisner's A Contract with God, the latter a book also made up of four short stories. By the time of the publication of these books a well-organized comics fandom had developed whose conventions, fanzines, and comic shops provided a more receptive environment for such innovations.

The Comics Journal placed Jungle Book 26th on its 1999 list of "Top 100 English-Language Comics of the Century", along with four other works with which Kurtzman was involved. Kim Thompson described the book as "the biggest 'if' in comics' history: What if it had been a success?" Thompson speculated on what Kurtzman may have been capable of if he had not had to resort to teaching, illustration, and Little Annie Fanny. Thompson called the book "one of the artform's most stunning successes, and one of the field's most heartbreaking failures". Kurtzman's self-portrait from the back cover of the book is used in connection with the Harvey Awards, named in Kurtzman's honor.
