= Archie Comics in popular culture =

The following is a list of reference to Archie Comics in popular culture.

== Film ==
- In 1998, director Tommy O'Haver was hired by Universal to write and direct a big-budget Archie movie, but the project never went before the cameras.
- In the 1985 feature film Police Academy 2, Officer Mahoney goes undercover to infiltrate a gang that is taking over their city. When first making contact with members of the gang, he claims that his name is Jughead and that he runs with a gang called The Archies.
- The 1970s soft-core porn movie Hot Times was loosely based on the Archie characters.
- In Chasing Amy, two characters argue over the sexual orientation of Archie, one claiming he is gay, the other that he is straight.
- In The Right Stuff, Gus Grissom wryly refers to fellow future Mercury astronauts John Glenn and Scott Carpenter as "Archie and Jughead" due to their friendly sense of competition during the grueling testing sessions conducted by government medical personnel.

== Television ==
- In the Seinfeld episode "The Wink", Jerry, Elaine, Kramer and George were once referred to as 'Archie', 'Veronica', 'Jughead' and 'Mr. Weatherbee' respectively
- In an episode of Smart Guy, TJ pretends to be stupid and reads a Jughead comic.
- In Ed, Ed's friend compares him to Archie.
- In Corner Gas, the characters compare themselves to the Archies and later dress up as them.

== Animation ==
- In The Simpsons episode "Sideshow Bob Roberts", Archie, Reggie, Moose, and Jughead make a brief cameo; they pull up to the Simpsons' house tossing Homer Simpson out of Archie's car as Moose warns Homer, "Duh, stay out of Riverdale!". Later in the episode, Homer is seen reading Archie Comics, plotting revenge on "those Riverdale punks."
- In The Simpsons episode "Lisa the Tree Hugger", Bart is shown reading an "Itchy & Veronica" comic book where he sighs and says aloud, "Oh, Betty..."
- In The Simpsons episode "Bart vs. Itchy & Scratchy", Grundy is seen on a poster of Cartoon Women's History in Lisa's bedroom.
- In an episode of Hey Arnold!, Helga mentions Jughead. Also Harold Berman originally had a crown beanie resembling that of Jughead.
- In the Drawn Together episode "Xandir and Tim, Sitting in a Tree", a red-haired character, shown playing Whac-A-Mole, is modeled after Archie Andrews.
- In the Johnny Bravo crossover episode with Scooby-Doo, Johnny, assigned to search for clues with Shaggy who would rather search for food, comments, "Why did I have to get stuck with Jughead?"
- In the Family Guy episode "North by North Quahog", Peter is caught reading an Archie comic book while driving the car, as he picks on Jughead for eating a large pile of hamburgers.
- On an episode of Robot Chicken, there's a parody with the Archie characters called "Archie's Final Destination" which mashes up Archie Comics and Final Destination. In the sketch, Archie and friends try to cheat Death. There was a later skit that put them on the reality show Are You the One?
- Jughead was featured in a Filmation-animated segment for Sesame Street about the letter J.

== Music ==
- The Firesign Theatre's album Don't Crush That Dwarf, Hand Me the Pliers has a segment called "High School Madness" about two characters based on Archie and Jughead.
- Trip-hop band Lovage wrote a song called "Archie & Veronica".
- Punk band Jughead's Revenge.
- Punk band The Riverdales wrote the song "Riverdale Stomp".
- Archie ‘n Jughead’s was the name of a popular record store in Melbourne, Australia.

== Comics ==
- In a The Simpsons comic, Archie appears in a flashback of Homer's teenage years, holding a sign that says "Riverdale".
- In 1954, Mad Magazine released the comic story Starchie, whose characters Starchie, Bottleneck, Biddy and Salonica were clear parodies of the Archie Comics teenagers. It has been reprinted numerous times.

== Lawsuits ==
- The February 1962 issue of Harvey Kurtzman's Help! magazine featured a parody of the Archie characters in its Goodman Beaver story, Goodman Goes Playboy, written by Kurtzman and illustrated by frequent collaborator, Will Elder (the magazine itself hit newsstands in December 1960). Attorneys for Archie Comics filed suit shortly thereafter, for copyright infringement. An agreement was reached in March 1964, with $1000 in damages paid, and an apology was issued. Later attempts to reprint the Goodman Beaver story, with names and artwork altered by NBN and Elder to minimize similarities to Archie characters and trademarks, were again met with threatened legal action by Archie Comics. However, according to a May 2008 posting on The Comics Journal website: "It resulted in waves of lawyers raining upon the strip’s creators, ultimately leading to Kurtzman and Elder handing the copyright to the story over to Archie and signing an agreement promising never to reproduce it again. Some 40 years or so later, Gary Groth discovered that Archie had forgotten to renew the copyright to the strip, and that it had fallen into the public domain." As a result, Goodman Goes Playboy can now be reprinted by anyone, anywhere, at any time, since it is no longer copyrighted by anyone. Ironically, despite the above legal wrangling, Archie Comics never took any action against Kurtzman, Elder nor publisher William Gaines for the 1954 Mad Magazine story Starchie, which has been reprinted numerous times.
- Archie Comics prohibits any fan fiction stories based on Archie Comics characters. Fans sometimes include adult and erotic content, and Archie Comics does not want to tarnish the clean and good-natured image of the characters or allow them to stray too far from the canon. Fanfiction.Net received a cease and desist order from Archie Comics to remove any stories based on Archie Comics' characters from its site. However, this did not include Archie Sonic Comic and its spin-offs due to Sega's copyrights. (However, story contests are frequently run through the official Archie website, allowing fans to create their own stories in accordance with site's rules).
- On April 4, 2003, Dad's Garage Theatre of Atlanta, was scheduled to debut a new play, Archie's Weird Fantasy, which depicted Riverdale's most famous resident coming out of the closet and moving to New York. The day before the play was scheduled to open, Archie Comics issued a cease and desist order threatening litigation if the play proceeded as written: "The play was to depict Archie and his pals from Riverdale growing up, coming out and facing censorship. 'Archie Comics' thought if Archie was portrayed as being gay, that would dilute and tarnish his image." For full report, see the "Archie satire lawsuit."
- Some believe the pop duet The Veronicas are named after Veronica Lodge, as it is reminiscent of The Archies. Archie Comics launched legal action against the group for trademark infringement. However, The Veronicas claimed that they merely liked the sound of the name Veronica, making it only a coincidence. A settlement was reached that included a cross-promotion deal where the duet appeared in some comics.
- Jughead's Revenge, an American punk rock, band was forced to split up after a lawsuit from Archie Comics in April 2001.
