= Harvey Kurtzman's editorship of Mad =

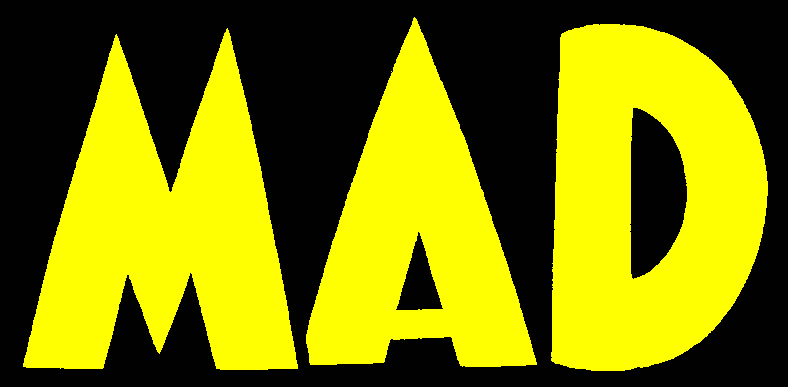
Logo of Mad before it became a magazine

American cartoonist Harvey Kurtzman was the founding editor and primary writer for the humor periodical Mad from its founding in 1952 until its 28th issue in 1956. Featuring pop-culture parodies and social satire, what began as a color comic book became a black-and-white magazine with its 24th issue.

In 1952 EC Comics publisher William Gaines suggested Kurtzman take on a humor title to supplement his income as editor and writer on the war series Two-Fisted Tales and Frontline Combat. Kurtzman's Mad stories at first lampooned comic book genres; soon Kurtzman took to parodying specific targets from popular culture, a style which became a staple of Mad. Kurtzman targeted and exposed what he saw as fundamental untruths in the subjects parodied. Jack Davis, Wally Wood, and especially Will Elder were the most prominent of early Mad's stable of artists. Mad's signature style was to target pop-culture subjects with parody and social satire, and playfulness such as covers disguised as school notebooks or contents printed upside-down.

Kurtzman's war titles ceased following the end of the Korean War in 1953, and Mad went from bi-monthly to monthly in 1954. Kurtzman pushed to have it turned into a magazine, which Gaines agreed to in 1955. Plummeting sales of EC's horror comics following the 1954 Senate Subcommittee on Juvenile Delinquency led to the cancelation of every EC title except Mad by the end of 1955. In 1956 Kurtzman demanded 51% ownership; Gaines refused, and Kurtzman left with the bulk of Mad's creative staff to found the short-lived Trump, published by Hugh Hefner. EC writer and editor Al Feldstein took over as editor at Mad, under whom sales climbed and the magazine became a newsstand fixture. Kurtzman went from one financially unstable publication to another before landing a regular position at Hefner's Playboy magazine with the comic strip Little Annie Fanny.

== History ==
=== Kurtzman at EC (1949–52) ===
In 1949 Harvey Kurtzman (1924–1993) brought sample artwork to the offices of EC Comics in New York City. "EC" had originally stood for "Educational Comics" when it was run by early comic-book business pioneer Max Gaines, but his son Bill renamed it "Entertaining Comics" and changed the company's focus when he inherited the business. Gaines liked the samples of Kurtzman's Hey Look! strip, but had no immediate use for his skills. Gaines directed Kurtzman to his brother David, who gave Kurtzman low-paying work on Lucky Fights It Through, a two-fisted cowboy story with an educational health message about syphilis. Kurtzman continued to receive work from EC.

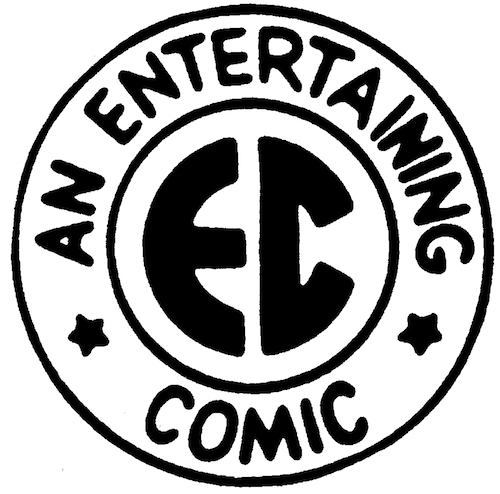
Kurtzman worked for EC Comics from 1950 to 1956.

In late 1950 Kurtzman began writing and editing the adventure comic book Two-Fisted Tales for EC; the war title Frontline Combat followed in mid-1951. The stories had a degree of realism not yet seen in American comics. Kurtzman rejected the idealization of war that had swept the US since World War II. He spent days or weeks researching story details, in the New York Public Library or interviewing and corresponding with GIs.

Kurtzman was given a great deal of artistic freedom by Gaines, but was himself a strict taskmaster. He insisted that the artists who drew his stories not deviate from his layouts. The artists generally respected Kurtzman's wishes out of respect for his creative authority, but some, such as Bernie Krigstein and Dan Barry, felt their own artistic autonomy impinged upon.

Those who worked for EC received payment based on output. Kurtzman's laborious working methods meant he was much less prolific than fellow EC writer-editor Al Feldstein, and Kurtzman felt financially under-appreciated for the amount of effort he poured into his work. He was burdened with a mortgage and a family. He also detested the horror content of the books Feldstein produced and which outsold his own work. He believed these stories had the same sort of influence on children that the chauvinism of other war comics had and which he believed he worked hard against in his own work.

=== Mad comic book (1952–55) ===
"Humor in a Jugular Vein"

—Mad's subtitle during its run as a comic book

Remembering Kurtzman's Hey Look! humor strips, Gaines proposed a humor comic book to increase Kurtzman's income, as he believed such a title would take far less time and effort to research. It was named Mad, a title Kurtzman remembered as his own idea, while Gaines recalled EC's Mad Mag as a suggestion of his own or Feldstein's. The first issue appeared in August 1952, cover-dated October–November. The stories in Mad targeted what Kurtzman saw as fundamental untruths in the subjects parodied, inspired by the irreverent humor found in contemporary college humor magazines; other precedents were in satirical cartoon magazines such as Judge and Ballyhoo, the latter of which was so popular for its spoofing of advertisements that advertisers paid for them. Kurtzman developed stories in the same incremental way he had for the war stories, and his layouts were followed faithfully by the artists who drew them—most frequently, Will Elder, Jack Davis, and Wally Wood.

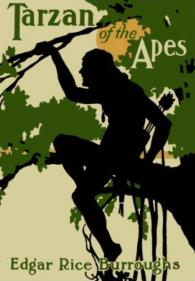
Tarzan was Mad's first targeted parody.

The first issue contained four stories, each a parody of a different comic-book genre: horror, science fiction, crime, and Westerns. These general parodies soon gave way to parodies of targeted subjects—Tarzan was the first such parody with "Melvin!" in the second issue.

The first three issues struggled—they did not sell enough of their 350,000-copy print runs to break even, and lost thousands of dollars for EC. In the fourth issue appeared the Wally Wood-drawn "Superduperman", a parody of Superman and Captain Marvel, and the copyright infringement lawsuit that National Periodicals had recently brought against Fawcett Comics. The fourth issue quickly sold out—Mad had found its audience.

The sixth issue featured a parody of Ernest Thayer's 1888 poem "Casey at the Bat". The text of the poem was unaltered; the humor lay in Davis's over-literal illustrations. Other parodies in this style followed, targeting such poems as "The Face upon the Barroom Floor" (#10), "Paul Revere's Ride" (#20), "The Raven" (#9), and "The Wreck of the Hesperus" (#16).

A parody of the comic strip Bringing Up Father in the seventeenth issue draws attention to societal tolerance of domestic violence. The pages alternate between the strip's cartoon style and realistically drawn ones—The Jiggs character, after his wife assaults him with crockery in a humorous cartoon sequence, emerges abraised in the next realistic panel. This style of parodying specific targets became a staple of Mad.

Interest in war comics flagged with the end of the Korean War. Gaines canceled Two-Fisted Tales and Frontline Combat in 1954 so Kurtzman could dedicate himself the more profitable Mad, which became EC's first monthly title with issue #10 (April 1954). At the time Mad was shipping 750,000 copies per issue, which was double the sales of EC's horror titles.

Numerous Mad imitators soon appeared from other publishers. The first was Whack, a 3-D comic book by Joe Kubert and Norman Maurer whose first issue appeared in October 1953. Numerous Mad-alike series followed, which such titles as Crazy, From Here to Insanity, Madhouse, and Unsane! EC produced a Mad imitator itself with the Feldstein-edited Panic, which Mad advertised in its ninth issue. Feldstein took the imitation so far as to mimic Kurtzman's "Kurtz"-plus-stick man signature with a "Feld"-plus-beer stein signature. Feldstein used the same pool of EC artists as well, and Kurtzman came to resent Panic and to see Feldstein's work there as a conflict of interest that "plundered all [his] techniques and artists". Panic's first-issue parody of Clement Clarke Moore's popular poem "'Twas the Night Before Christmas" attracted calls for censorship as a "pagan" reworking "desecrating Christmas". A Mickey Spillane parody "My Gun Is the Jury" led to the arrest of EC business manager Lyle Stewart for selling its issue to undercover police. The American Civil Liberties Union watched closely from the sidelines as an EC lawyer succeeded in having the case dismissed.

Kurtzman poured himself into Mad, putting as much effort into it as he had into his war books, defeating the purpose of having an easy-to-crank-out third comic book. When Frontline Combat was canceled in 1954, Kurtzman devoted himself entirely to Mad.

=== Mad magazine (1955–56) ===
Since the 1940s, crime and horror comics had been drawing fire from those worried about a rise in juvenile delinquency. The Senate Subcommittee on Juvenile Delinquency brought pressure on such comic books in 1954, and EC, one of the major purveyors of such fare, found their distributor refusing their wares. Mad was still an exception and was even featured in the August issue of Pageant in the article "Now Comics Have Gone Mad". Kurtzman had long had a dream to be in the slick magazine publishing world and had been trying to convince Gaines to publish Mad in a magazine format. Pageant's publisher Alex Hillman offered Kurtzman a job, and with the prospect of losing Kurtzman, Gaines gave in to Kurtzman's demands.

Kurtzman gathered a collection of newsstand magazines to work out the standards under which Mad was to operate. EC's comics had been printed on cheap paper on presses also used for newspapers; for Mad Kurtzman found a higher-quality printer in Brooklyn through printing broker George Dougherty. He also chose to forego color and to have typeset lettering instead of the hand-lettering typical of comic books to give the magazine a sheen of class. The magazine-format twenty-fourth issue of Mad débuted in July 1955 with a 25-cent cover price, and the EC crew went to watch it coming off the presses. It was so much more successful than anticipated that, unusual in magazine publishing, it was given a second printing.

The new format was ambitious, and the printing quality allowed for the reproduction of much more finely detailed artwork. It included meticulously rendered advertisement parodies and text pieces by humorists such as Ernie Kovacs, Stan Freberg, and Steve Allen.

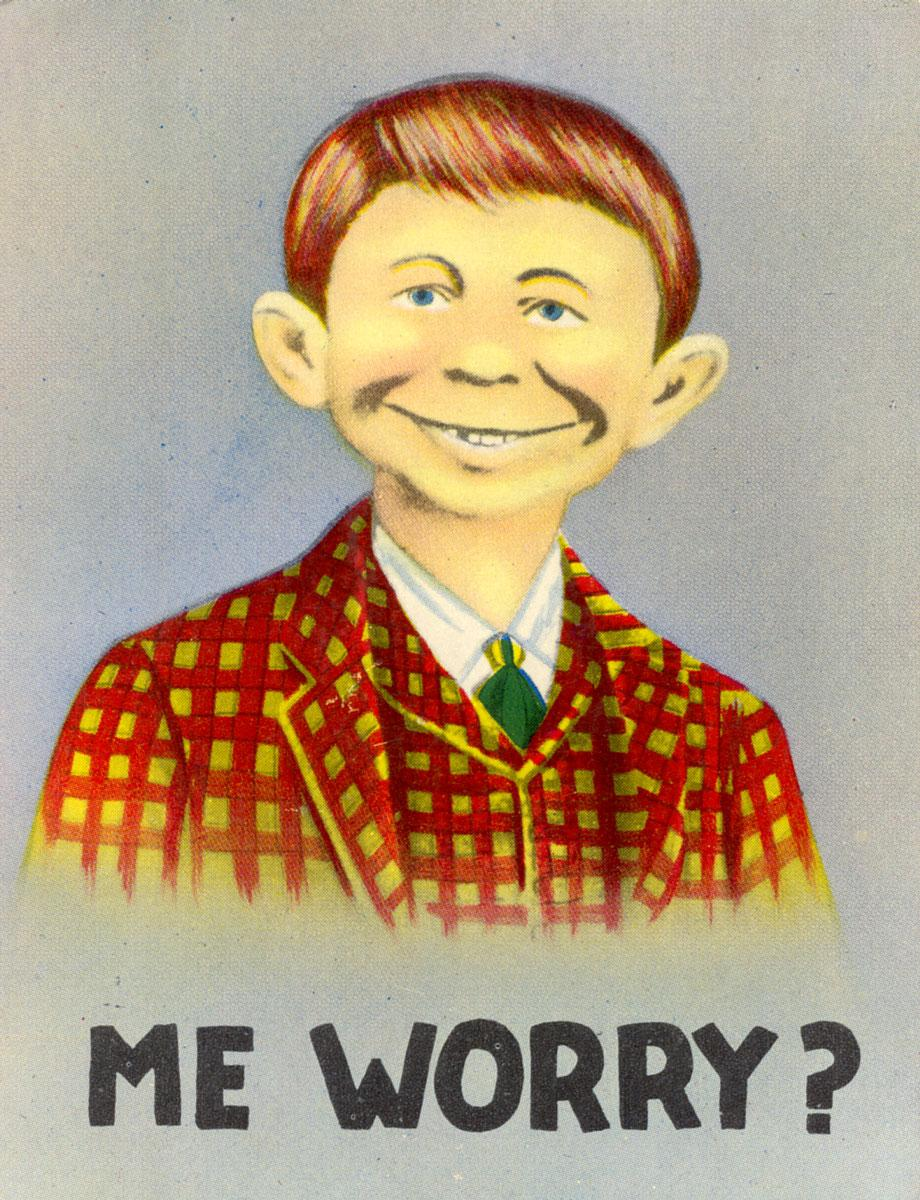
Kurtzman appropriated the "Me Worry?" character as Mad's mascot; Al Feldstein named him Alfred E. Neuman.

The paperback book market boomed in the 1950s, and in 1954 Ian Ballantine approached Gaines with a paperback Mad reprint deal. Gaines was reluctant, as he was not impressed with the terms Ballantine offered, but Kurtzman was eager and convinced Gaines to accept. Unlike most comic-book publishers, EC archived artwork after initial publication. This allowed the material to be recycled, and Ballantine Books published the Kurtzman-edited Mad Reader that November with an introduction by comedian Roger Price. (Note: Price provided the introduction for no fee.) The book became a perennially good seller along with four others Kurzman was involved with: Mad Strikes Back! (1955), Inside Mad (1955), Utterly Mad (1956), and The Brothers Mad (1958). The books were reprinted frequently and sold millions of copies—The Mad Reader alone was reprinted five times in 1955, each with six-figure pressings. While he stayed with EC, Gaines paid Kurtzman 25% of the royalties for the books, and another 25% to the artists, though he was under no contractual obligation to do so.

The cover of The Mad Reader featured an unnamed gap-toothed character whose face soon reappeared in a fake mail-order catalogue advertisement that was the cover to Mad #21. He reappeared on the back of April 1956 issue #27 with the slogan: "What—me worry?" The image was an enlargement of a postcard Kurtzman had found, and his name changed from issue to issue—Melvin Coznowski in one, Mel Haney in another—even the "What—Me Worry?" kid. It was Feldstein who named him Alfred E. Neuman in issue #29—a joke name that EC writers had occasionally used—and the cult character went on to appear on nearly every cover of Mad.

Financial restrictions meant color was eliminated in favor of larger pages and nearly double the page count that the comic book had. The page count allowed for a greater variety of features, such as one-pagers, parodies of advertisements, and text pieces. Kurtzman's own art contributions diminished under the increased editorial workload; he did create the border artwork that adorned several years' worth of the magazine's covers, as well as the logo that still is used.

The magazine-format Mad expanded its range of parody subjects to magazine-style articles, such as a do-it-yourself article in the style of Popular Mechanics, a send-up of the "Photo Quiz" feature of Look, and a report from the magazine's "Russian correspondant" entirely in Russian. There were more all-text articles, and artwork often featured Craftint halftones to simulate the feel of photographs.

EC's fortunes were falling. In April 1955 EC dropped its horror titles and launched the New Direction line. whose titles were free of horror and crime. Following a press conference in September 1954 at which Gaines pledged to deliver "comics which will offend no one". The EC brand remained tainted in the eyes of retailers, and many refused to stock the new titles. From another angle Gaines and Feldstein launched the Adult Picto-Fiction line of comics magazines in a Mad-like black-and-white, typeset format; each title was canceled after only two issues.

Mad was a success, but Kurtzman missed deadlines so frequently that it was only appearing quarterly, and he was pushing for more money for the artists. The distributor Leader News went bankrupt with $110,000 unpaid to EC, so Gaines was unable to pay off the $100,000 in debt EC had accumulated. Gaines planned to shut down EC, including the still-profitable Mad, but Kurtzman convinced him to keep going with Mad. The pair convinced Gaines' mother, who was EC's co-owner, for an investment of $50,000 to settle debts, and with another $60,000 from Gaines EC continued with Mad as sole title.

Wholesalers left with unreturnable stock due to Leader's demise were reluctant to take another chance on Mad, so Gaines worked out a deal with American News Company, a company with its own wholesalers unaffected by the Leader situation. The new deal gave Mad wider distribution and by 1956 circulation had reached half a million.

=== Kurtzman's departure ===
Mad's circulation was rising issue by issue, but while Kurtzman was pleased finally to be editor of a magazine, he was frustrated at the financial restrictions. He felt the $25-page rate for contributors was too low, and wanted to include color features. He felt responsible to a degree for EC's survival, and felt insufficiently rewarded for it. He also felt that Gaines and his business manager Lyle Stuart had handled the business poorly; Kurtzman felt that the horror comics, which Kurtzman despised, had brought on the Senate hearings, and that the failure of the New Direction and Picto-Fiction lines had resulted in a tightened budget and uncertain future for Mad.

One-time cartoonist Hugh Hefner was a media mogul by the mid-1950s with his Playboy magazine. He admired Kurtzman's Mad, and met Kurtzman in New York to express his appreciation. He let Kurtzman know that if he ever left Mad, there would be a place for him in the Hefner empire. With this promise to back him, Kurtzman demanded legal control of Mad from Gaines in the form of stocks. Reluctant to lose the editor of his sole remaining publication, Gaines counter-offered with a 10% share. As this would not give Kurtzman the control he wanted, Kurtzman countered by asking for 51%. Stuart advised Gaines to replace Kurtzman with Feldstein, and Gaines's wife agreed. Gaines gave Kurtzman the news, and they went their separate ways.

Gaines, who had given Kurtzman work in 1949 when the cartoonist was in need, felt that Kurtzman had betrayed him, and held the departure against him for years. Exacerbating the situation were the facts that Kurtzman had taken most of the Mad staff with him, leaving Mad with Feldstein, whose Panic had been a failure. It appeared Gaines would not last much longer in publishing; Joe Orlando overheard him say he would go back to teaching.

=== Mad after Kurtzman ===
Kurtzman left after issue #28, but much of the content that appeared in the twenty-ninth and thirtieth issues had been done under his supervision. Feldstein was still fresh on the job when Time reported that Hefner was to publish a "still unnamed magazine" and had "hired the whole staff of Mad, a short-lived satirical pulp." Kurtzman had lured away almost all the primary contributors except for Wally Wood, leaving Feldstein to build a new stable of contributors. Fans of the Kurtzman era felt that Kurtzman's post-Mad work was more biting and politically minded, while Feldstein's Mad was financially cautious and aimed at a somewhat younger audience. The strategy paid off: the magazine was a publishing and merchandising fixture by the 1960s and circulation peaked at 2.4 million in the 1970s.

Devotees of Kurtzman's version found the magazine to have deteriorated after his departure. To others it lost its edge—it avoided satirizing targets such as segregation out of fears of hurting circulation. This reluctance was the target of a parody of the magazine in Esquire, prefaced with: "Just imagine what it would be like if you picked up your monthly copy of Bad and found us dealing with subjects of genuine significance in America!" The restriction on mature themes drove Paul Krassner to leave Mad to found The Realist in 1958 as an adult-oriented alternative to Mad.

Mad continued to be successful for the rest of Gaines' life. By the time Kurtzman left, the EC sign that had hung at the office entrance had been replaced with a Mad one. Gaines sold Mad for $5 million in 1961, and ownership passed to National Periodicals in 1962.

Had Kurtzman stayed with Mad, he said he would have urged Gaines to include advertising, as did Feldstein to no avail. Ad revenue might have allowed for higher production values, such as color interiors. Kurtzman intended to keep the focus on a teenage and adult audience, rather than the younger audience Feldstein's Mad appealed to.

=== Kurtzman after Mad ===
Gaines retained all of the work that Kurtzman had done with EC as it was work made for hire. Kurtzman had received bonuses from Gaines for sales of the Mad paperback collections, but this was not stipulated in Kurtzman's contract and Gaines stopped the payments when Kurtzman left.

Kurtzman tried to recreate Mad's success in one publication after the other. The lavish, full-color Trump was a lusher and more risqué version of Mad. Hefner canceled it after two issues when Playboy Enterprises ran into financial troubles and had to scale back operations. The magazine had been a success in the market, but had already accrued $100,000 in expenses. Hefner said, "I gave Harvey Kurtzman an unlimited budget, and he exceeded it."

Humbug, self-financed by its main contributors, lasted eleven issues before distribution and format issues led to its demise. Longer-lasting was Help!, co-published with James Warren. Help! had a low budget and made frequent use of fumetti photographic comics, and printed a number of Goodman Beaver strips by Kurtzman and Elder, some of whose parody subjects—Tarzan, Superman, and Archie—Kurtzman had parodied in Mad. Help! also printed early work by future underground cartoonists such as Robert Crumb and Gilbert Shelton.

Kurtzman approached Hefner to run a Goodman Beaver comic strip in Playboy. In 1962 Hugh Hefner agreed, but Goodman Beaver had to be transformed into the voluptuous female Little Annie Fanny. With Will Elder as primary collaborator the painted, full-color strip ran from 1962 to 1988.

Kurtzman had reconciled with Gaines by the mid-1980s, and in collaboration with Elder and others, created 23 pieces and covers for Mad from 1985 to 1989, starting in the last issue that Feldstein co-edited before retirement.

== Content and style ==
With the second issue's take on Tarzan Kurtzman developed the targeted parody style that became a signature of Mad. As Kurtzman described it, "Satire and parody work best when what you're talking about is accurately targeted ... when you reveal a fundamental flaw or untruth in your subject."

The parodies struck at the basic premises of their targets: the hero in "Superduperman" proves his mettle by defeating his foe and assumes he can win the heart of the woman he desires with displays of his machismo. She rejects him as she rejected his mild-mannered reporter alter ego, declaring, "Once a creep, always a creep".

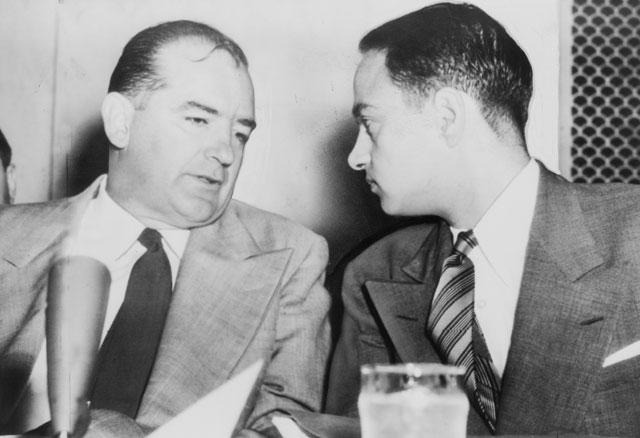
US Senator Joseph McCarthy (left) was the subject of Kurtzman's only political parody, using the format of the game show What's My Line? to satirize McCarthyism.

Kurtzman tended to shy away from politics, though he made an exception with "What's My Shine?" in the seventeenth issue in November 1954. Via the format of the game show What's My Line?, Kurtzman satirized the televised Army–McCarthy hearings of 1954 that resulted in the US Senate reprimanding Senator Joseph McCarthy for his aggressively hunting out of Communist subversives. Kurtzman stated he made this exception as he felt McCarthy "was so evil. It was like doing a satire on Hitler."

Kurtzman gave several of the stories with a whimsical, deconstructionist approach: one issue was printed upside-down; another presented the same story twice, the dialogue replaced with gibberish in the second round; and one issue was devoted to a faux biography of Will Elder as fine artist. This playfulness extended to the covers. They imitated Life magazine, a tabloid newspaper, a racetrack results sheet, and a school composition book, with the notice: "Designed to sneak into class". On the 21st cover was a parody of the mail-order Johnson Smith Company's ads that were common in comic books—the Mad version offered a wide range of ridiculous merchandise, including torpedoes and live alligators. Kurtzman was responsible for the finished artwork on about half the covers.

Kurtzman considered his visuals his strong point, and his writing clumsy. He wrote in a colloquial style replete with wordplay, including a plethora of Yiddish, foreign, or made-up words used in a nonsensical manner: "furshlugginer", "potrzebie", and "veeblefetzer" among them. Names were used for their humorous effect, such as the running gag name "Melvin" used in stories such as "Melvin of the Apes" and "Little Orphan Melvin", and as the name of the mysterious figure on the cover of the first issue.

During Mad's run as a comic book, Kurtzman wrote and laid out each story. He built up his layouts laboriously on multiple sheets of tracing paper before passing them on to be finished by the artists. Most EC artists contributed to Mad at some time, but none more frequently than Jack Davis, Wally Wood, and especially Will Elder. While following Kurtzman's layouts strictly, Elder greatly expanded the art, inserting countless visual gags into the backgrounds.

National, the owners of Superman's copyright, threatened to sue over the "Superduperman" parody. EC and National had the same lawyer, who advised Gaines to quit publishing parodies. While Gaines was weighing this advice, Kurtzman located a legal precedent that backed his and Mad's right to publish parodies. Gaines hired the author of the precedent to write a brief substantiating EC's position, but the companies' shared lawyer disagreed, siding with National over EC. Gaines consulted a third lawyer, who advised Gaines to simply ignore the threat and continue publishing parodies. National never filed suit.

The covers often imitated other publications. Basil Wolverton's parodied the glamour covers of Life magazine on the cover of Mad #11. That of #12 was in the all-text style of The Atlantic. #19 imitated a horse-racing form, and #21 was done in the manner of densely-packed advertisements for mail-order novelty products that often appeared in comic books. The 20th cover imitated a school composition notebook, and announced it was "designed to sneak into class".

== Legacy ==
Mad's success immediately led to a slew of imitators form other publishers: Bughouse, Flip, Madhouse, Riot, Whack, Wild, and others. From December 1953 EC itself put out an imitator with the Feldstein-edited Panic.

The irreverent style Kurtzman had pioneered in Mad had a strong influence on the underground comix of the 1960s and 1970s.

== List of issues ==
Issues of Mad edited by Harvey Kurtzman
Issue	Cover date	Contents
1	October–November 1952	"Hoohah!" (Jack Davis); "Blobs!" (Wally Wood); "Ganefs!" (Will Elder); "Varmint!" (John Severin)
2	December 1952 – January 1953	"Hex!"; "Melvin!"; "Gookum!"; "Mole!"
3	January–February 1953	"Dragged Net!"; "Sheik of Araby!"; "The Dandelion Caper!"; "V-Vampires!"; "Lone Stranger!"
4	April–May 1953	"Superduperman!"; "Flob was a Slob!"; "Robin Hood!"; "Shadow!"
5	June–July 1953	"Outer Sanctum!"; "Black and Blue Hawks!"; "Miltie of the Mounties!"; "Kane Keen!"
6	August–September 1953	"Teddy and the Pirates!"; "Melvin of the Apes!"; "Casey at the Bat!"; "Ping Pong!"
7	October–November 1953	"Shermlock Shomes!"; "Treasure Island!"; "Hey Look!"; "Smilin' Melvin!"
8	December 1953 – January 1954	"Frank N. Stein!"; "Lone Stranger Rides Again!"; "Hey Look!"; "Batboy and Rubin!"
9	March 1954	"Little Orphan Melvin!"; "The Raven!"; "Bop Jokes!"; "Hah! Noon!"
10	April 1954	"G.I. Shmoe!"; "Sane!"; "The Face upon the Floor!"; "Woman Wonder!"
11	May 1954	"Flesh Garden!"; "Mad Reader!" (Basil Wolverton); "Murder the Husband! Murder the Story!"; "Dragged Net!"
12	June 1954	"Starchie"; "From Eternity Back to Here!"; "Mark Trade!"; "3-Dimensions!"
13	July 1954	"Prince Violent!"; "Book! Movie!"; "Baby Quips!"; "Robinson Crusoe!"
14	August 1954	"Manduck the Magician!"; "Movie ... Ads!"; "The Countynental!"; "Plastic Sam!"
15	September 1954	"Gasoline Valley!"; "Pot-Shot Pete"; "Wild ½!"; "Captain TVideo"
16	October 1954	"Shermlock Sholmes in The Hound of the Basketballs!"; "Newspapers!"; "Restaurant!"; "Wreck of the Hesperus!"
17	November 1954	"Bringing Back Father!"; "What's My Shine!"; "Meet Miss Potgold!"; "Julius Caesar!"
18	December 1954	"Alice in Wonderland!"; "Howdy Dooit!"; "Pot-Shot Pete"; "Stalag 18!"
19	January 1955	"Mickey Rodent!"; "Supermarkets!"; "Puzzle Pages!"; "The Cane Mutiny!"
20	February 1955	"Katchandhammer Kids!"; "Sound Effects!"; "Paul Revere's Ride!"; "Cowboy!"
21	March 1955	"Poopeye!"; "Slow Motion!"; "Comic Book Ads!"; "Under the Waterfront!"
22	April 1955	"Special Art Issue with altered Picasso cover; "Traces life of Bill (Chicken-Fat) Elder from Child to Senility."; "The Old Pro!"
23	May 1955	"Gopo Gossum!"; "Scenes We'd ... Like to See!"; "Believe It or Don't!"; "The Barefoot Nocountessa!"
24	July 1955	"Is a Trip to the Moon Possible?"; "Wrestling"; "Is This Your Life?"; "Vera's Cruz"; "Tom Swiffft"; "Who Put the Strichnine in Mrs. Murphy's Husband?"; "You Can?"; "How To Get the Job You Want By Thinking ... etc."; "Out of the Frying Pan and into the Soup"; "Inside Russia"; "Comics Digest"; "Pictoquiz"
25	September 1955	"Radiodetectiveland"; "Leave Me or Me Leave"; "The Jack E. Glisten Story"; "Anyone for Wrist Slashing?" (Stan Freberg); "The Stark Club"; "The Blackboard Jumble"; "Very Square Dance" (Steve Allen); "Baseball ... Science Or Skill?"; "Was George Washington 'George'?"; "The Sleeping Beauty" (Ernie Kovacs); "Mad Awards"; "Newspapers"; "They Built Their Dream House Singlehanded"; "Advice to Young Men on How to Get into the Army" (Roger Price)
26	November 1955	"The Dave Garrowunway Show"; "The Prodigious"; "The Seven Itchy Years"; "Boxing"; "Crash McCool"
27	April 1956	"The Ed Suvillan Show"; "Ulysses"; "Nightwatch"
28	July 1956	"He Rose Tattooed"; "Medical"
