= Little Annie Fanny =

Comic by Harvey Kurtzman published in Playboy magazine

- Little Annie Fanny Volume 1, Dark Horse Comics, 2000
- Author: Harvey Kurtzman
- Illustrators: Will Elder; Russ Heath; Arnold Roth; Jack Davis; Al Jaffee; Frank Frazetta; Paul Coker
- Current status/schedule: Concluded
- Launch date: October 1962
- End date: September 1988
- Publisher: Playboy Enterprises
- Genre: Adult humor

Little Annie Fanny is a comics series by Harvey Kurtzman and Will Elder. It appeared in 107 two- to seven-page episodes in Playboy magazine from October 1962 to September 1988. Little Annie Fanny is a humorous satire of contemporary American society and its sexual mores. Annie Fanny, the title character, is a statuesque, buxom young blonde woman who innocently finds herself nude in every episode. The series is notable for its painted, luminous color artwork and for being the first full-scale, multi-page comics feature in a major American publication.

Harvey Kurtzman, a cartoonist, created the series at the culmination of his career. He had launched Mad magazine, worked briefly for Playboy publisher Hugh Hefner and on a series of solo and collaborative projects, then returned to working for Hefner with Little Annie Fanny. Each episode of the comic strip was designed and written by Kurtzman and rendered in oil, tempera, and watercolor by Elder. Hefner edited each episode, often requiring detailed changes to ensure that the series remained true to the magazine's editorial style. Critical reaction was mixed, with most praising the elaborate, fully painted comic, but some dismissing it as falling short of Kurtzman's full potential. The complete series was collected into two volumes in 2000 and 2001 by Dark Horse Comics.

== History ==
=== Conception ===
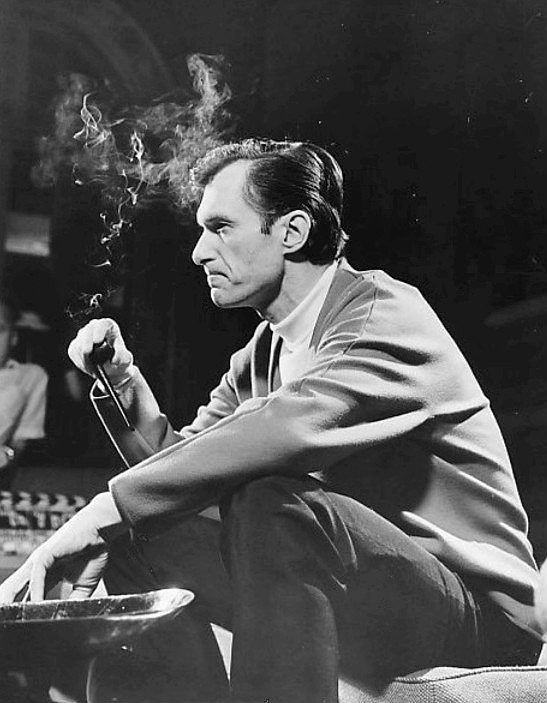
Hugh Hefner in 1966

Harvey Kurtzman founded the satirical Mad magazine in 1952; an early fan was onetime cartoonist Hugh Hefner, who founded the men's magazine Playboy in 1953. Hefner offered Kurtzman an opportunity to conceive a new humor magazine for his enterprise, which the cartoonist accepted when he left Mad in 1956 in an ownership dispute. Kurtzman took most of the Mad artists with him, including frequent collaborator Will Elder, to create the adult-oriented humor magazine Trump. Although it sold well, Hefner ran into financial problems in 1957 and halted Trump after two issues. He provided office space for the artists, from which they self-published the satirical magazine Humbug in 1957–58. It failed to gain a significant following, and a dejected Kurtzman began pitching feature proposals to Playboy, all of which were rejected. However, he received a note from Hefner: "I bow to no one in my appreciation for H. Kurtzman." Hefner's praise encouraged Kurtzman to meet with publisher Ian Ballantine and create Harvey Kurtzman's Jungle Book (1959). This introduced the innocent and idealistic Goodman Beaver, a male character who continued to appear—with artwork by Elder—in Kurtzman's Help! (1960).

Kurtzman continued to correspond with Hefner and Playboy executive editor Ray Russell, who was interested in Kurtzman's idea of a comic strip suitable for the magazine's audience and suggested "satire ... as an excuse or rationale for a slick magazine to be publishing a comic strip." Although single-panel cartoons were an established part of the magazine, a comic strip was unprecedented and had to be justified. Kurtzman submitted some Goodman Beaver strips and was surprised to receive a favorable response from Hefner, who liked the "fresh and eager" character. He especially enjoyed "Goodman Goes Playboy", which featured a boisterous romp in Hefner's mansion. Hefner nevertheless insisted that the material was not right for his magazine, but requested an explanation of the character with a suggestion: "Maybe there is a way of launching a similar series ... that can somehow be related to Playboy". Kurtzman replied that Goodman Beaver "could be foolish and at the same time wise," and that he "innocently partakes of the bad while espousing the good." He further stated that Beaver's innocent, restive, and charming nature allotted him especial creative freedom. A week later, Kurtzman wrote to Hefner, "What would you think of a girl character ... whom I could apply to my kind of situations?" Six weeks later Hefner replied, "I think your notion of doing a Goodman Beaver strip of two, three, or four pages, but using a sexy girl ... is a bull's eye. We can run it every issue."

=== Production ===
Typical elaborately designed and fully painted Little Annie Fanny panel, published in December 1967

Kurtzman recruited his long-time collaborator Will Elder to work on the strip's illustrations. He suggested to Elder an "outlineless", painted style, then thought the strip would be better suited by an India inked, outlined comic book style with flat color behind it. Hefner, whose opinion prevailed, preferred the more difficult, fully painted, outlineless look. Kurtzman's suggestions for the feature's name included The Perils of Zelda, The Perils of Irma, and Little Mary Mixup; he settled on Little Annie Fanny, its title and logo a parody of Harold Gray's Little Orphan Annie. The cartoonist began submitting story ideas for the multi-page comic strip to Hefner for approval. Over the twenty-six years he wrote the character, he was allowed (with Playboy's substantial budget) to travel for research, photography, and sketching. He followed this with a preliminary script for Hefner, who revised it. Kurtzman then worked out the story's composition, pacing, and action in thumbnail drawings and pencil roughs of each page of the comic, followed by larger, more-detailed layouts on translucent vellum specifying lighting, color, and speech balloon placement. These also required Hefner's approval—a typical two- to seven-page episode would take as many as nine pages of layout. Kurtzman then discussed the layout with Elder, who drove from his home in New Jersey to Kurtzman's in New York. Kurtzman acted out every detail of the strip; according to Elder, "He would change his voice and take on the characteristics of each role ... We'd crack each other up and fall down laughing." This gave Elder what he needed to create the penciling, including "eye pops" (background gags worked into blank areas of Kurtzman's layout; Hefner rejected many, so Elder created as many as possible) and the final rendering. Elder painted in oil, tempera, and watercolor, never using ink. Beginning with a white illustration board, Elder explained he would "pile on" his oil paint, light colors over dark, then apply tempera, then layer several watercolor washes to give Annie luminous tones. "The colors were like gems to me," he said. "I worked very hard to give them iridescence." The work was labor-intensive and deadlines were often difficult to meet, so other artists, including Russ Heath, Arnold Roth, Jack Davis, Al Jaffee, Frank Frazetta, and Paul Coker, were occasionally enlisted to help finish the art. Jaffee, a childhood friend of Elder, said about the experience: "Little Annie Fannie was the most unique, lavishly produced cartoon cum illustration feature ever. Each panel was a miniature masterpiece that Willie glazed and re-glazed in brilliant watercolor until he reached the level of 3-D-like translucence that he wanted. I know from first-hand experience what went into this project." Letterers inked the dialog balloons before Kurtzman cleaned and submitted the finished work. Little Annie Fanny, Playboy's first comic strip, was the first multi-page comics feature in a major American magazine.

== Characters ==
Annie Fanny is the feature's lead character. Like other young women in Playboy pictorials, Annie is beautiful, buxom, and often unclothed. She is sexually innocent, oblivious to the worldliness around her. Like her forebear Goodman Beaver, Annie was conceived as a modern Candide, above the story's corruptions and temptations. Unlike Goodman, however, Annie is never shocked or offended; she remains blithe. The authors of Icons of the American Comic Book say Annie "glides through a changing world with an untiring optimism" with a "good-natured lack of desire". She is insulated from the carnal nature of those around her, who explain the new rules of society to her each episode. Ruthie, Annie's mother hen roommate, appears in the first episode and remains in the strip throughout its run. Wanda Homefree, Annie Fanny's wild and shapely best friend, first appears in an episode-10 beauty contest as Miss Greenwich Village and is often seen at Annie's side throughout the remainder of the series. Ralphie Towzer, Annie's nerdy-but-hip do-gooder boyfriend, has the look of Goodman Beaver (with playwright Arthur Miller's eyeglasses and pipe) and the temperament of a strait-laced, chastising prude. Solly Brass, Annie's huckster agent, is based on actor Phil Silvers.

A number of other characters in Little Annie Fanny are derived from Gray's Little Orphan Annie. Sugardaddy Bigbucks, Annie's surrogate father and a powerful, manipulative capitalist, is based on Daddy Warbucks. His mysterious assistant, the Wasp, derives from Warbucks' assistant the Asp, and Punchjab, his bodyguard, comes from the character Punjab. Other supporting characters include ad man Benton Battbarton (whose name is taken from the advertising agencies Batten, Barton, Durstine & Osborn and Benton & Bowles), Battbarton's rival Huck Buxton (modeled on gap-toothed British actor Terry-Thomas), Duncan Fyfe Hepplewhite (an art plagiarist), and Freddie Flink (who resembles comic actor Fred Gwynne from Car 54, Where Are You?).

== Synopsis ==
Little Annie Fanny takes the reader through the changing attitudes of American culture, satirizing contemporary trends and fads. In each of the 107 episodes, Annie experiences the latest popular movie, fashion statement, national politics, or society headline. During the strip's first decade, when it ran up to eleven times per year, Annie meets caricatures of the Beatles (who lust for Annie), Sean Connery (playing "James Bomb"), reclusive Catcher in the Rye author J. D. Salinger (as "Salinger Fiengold"), NFL champions Green Bay Packers (as the "Greenback Busters"), and Elvis Presley, Bob Dylan, and Sonny & Cher on the "Hoopadedoo Show" (Hullabaloo show). During these early years, the strip pokes fun at miniskirts, LSD, free love, and bra burning. Background caricatures include Soviet Premier Nikita Khrushchev, prissy-but-powerful J. Edgar Hoover, unisex fashion designer Rudi Gernreich, and the "Put a Tiger in Your Tank" ad campaign of Humble Oil. During the 1970s, when the strip ran three to five times per year, Annie sees violent films such as A Clockwork Orange and The French Connection and meets sex novelist Philip Roth, consumer advocate Ralph Nader, chess champion Bobby Fischer, and shock rocker Alice Cooper. She experiences disco, streaking, C.B. radio, nudist resorts, and women's liberation. Background "eye pops" include Hollywood heavy Charles Bronson, Laugh-In's Arte Johnson, the Avis TV commercial's O. J. Simpson, and Star Wars' C-3PO. In the 1980s, when Little Annie Fanny appeared once or twice a year, Annie deals with personal computers, goes to Urban Cowboy's Gilley's Club, cruises on The Love Boat, and encounters Indiana Jones, Ayatollah Khomeini, Jim and Tammy Faye Bakker, and Woody Allen. Elder's background gags include the Coneheads, Howard Cosell, Miss Piggy, E.T., and Billy Beer.

== Reception ==
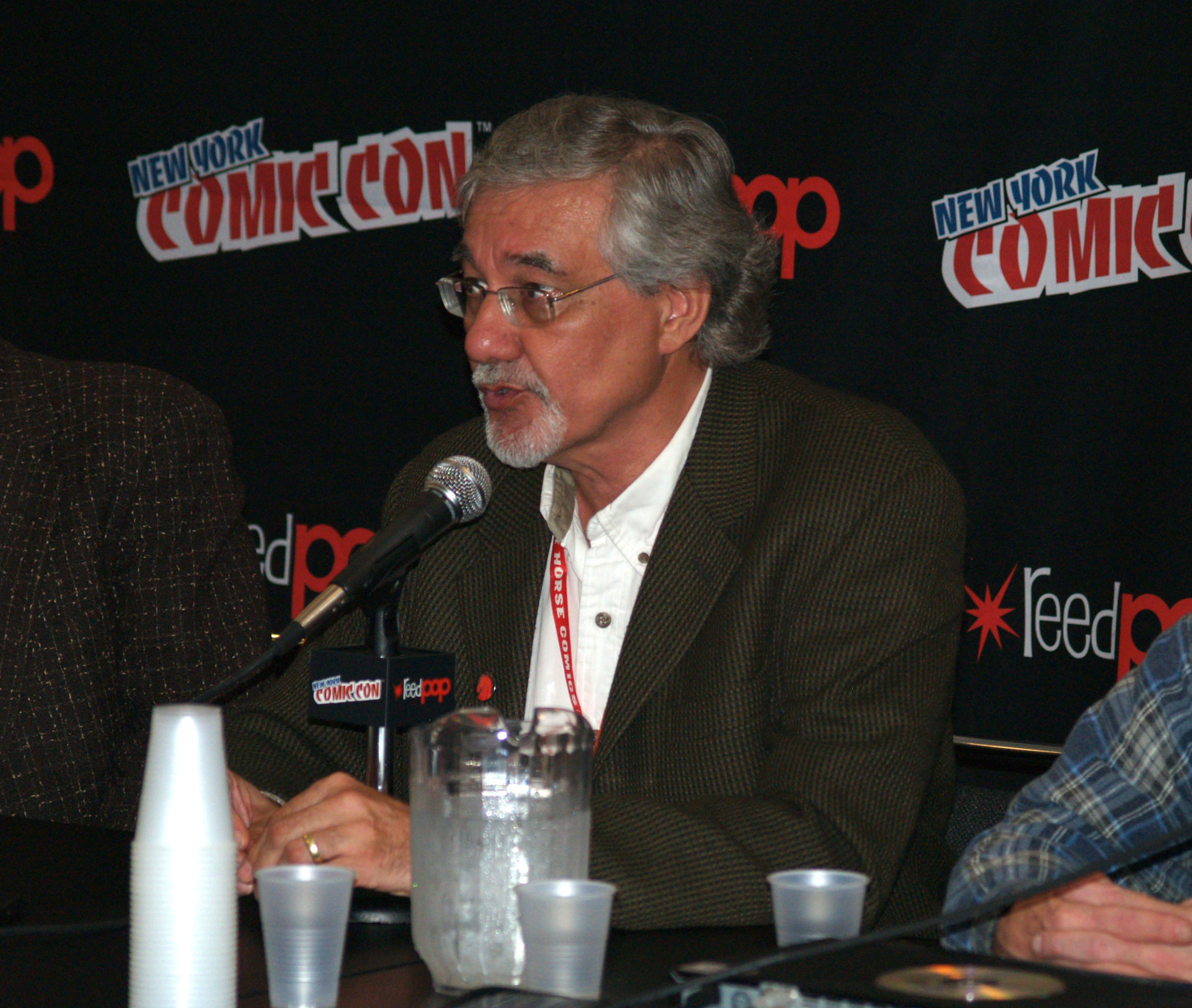
According to Denis Kitchen, "Most Kurtzman devotees would not consider Little Annie Fanny genius work".

Comics historian Don Markstein said that Little Annie Fanny "reached a high point seldom achieved by cartoon art", saying "Harvey Kurtzman ... strove for most of his life to advance the boundaries of comics, not just in terms of storytelling but also in production values", concluding that Little Annie Fanny achieved at least the latter. About its venue he said, "Playboy magazine, whatever you may say about its content, always did a first-rate job of printing color pictures." According to comics commentators Randy Duncan and Matthew J. Smith, the series "reads today as an amusing look at the evolving mores of the sexual revolution". Comics editor Monte Beauchamp said that Little Annie Fanny was "the most elaborate comic strip ever created" and cartoonist-critic R. C. Harvey called it "a masterpiece ... the most lavish color comic strip of all time".

Not all were as impressed. Noting that Kurtzman was financially strapped before making his living for twenty-six years from Playboy, historian Paul Buhle wrote: "The strip had many brilliant early moments, but went downhill as the writer and artist bent to editor Hugh Hefner's demands for as much titillation as possible." Cartoonist Art Spiegelman said that Little Annie Fanny devolved from the more interesting Goodman Beaver. Underground cartoonist Robert Crumb, whose career Kurtzman helped launch, scorned Playboy and Annie. Monty Python's Terry Gilliam, the former assistant editor of Help!, said that Little Annie Fanny was not as sharp as Kurtzman's earlier work: "technically brilliant but ... slightly compromised." Art agent and publisher Denis Kitchen, who handles Kurtzman and Eisner's estates, said that "most Kurtzman devotees would not consider Little Annie Fanny genius work ... [and] some would argue the opposite: that it was genius diluted or degraded". Kitchen placed the onus on Kurtzman's employer Hefner, who "was often a punctilious taskmaster with a heavy red pen who often had very different ideas about what was funny or satiric" and insisted that each strip "had to include Annie disrobing". Beauchamp agreed: "Unfortunately, Hefner was notorious for his heavy editorial hand." Duncan and Smith also agreed, and wrote that "humor sometimes mixes awkwardly with the loaded topics of the era, and some have found Annie's lack of character development and the requisite sexual hijinks an impediment to taking her seriously." However, they repeated their respect: "The eternally innocent Annie performed admirably as a nonjudgmental witness to the changing tides of the sexual revolution."

== Other media ==
The December 1978 issue of Playboy mentioned a "worldwide search for the actress" who would "portray Little Annie Fanny in a live-action movie". In 2000, Playboy TV approached Mainframe Entertainment to create a CGI animated television series based on Little Annie Fanny, but no series was ever produced.

Twenty-six early episodes of the comic were reprinted in book form by Playboy Press in 1966 and 1972. After Kurtzman's death in 1993, Playboy revived the comic in 1998 with art by Ray Lago and Bill Schorr, publishing seven episodes until 2000. Dark Horse Comics collected all episodes of the series and published them in two volumes (2000 and 2001), with annotations by Denis Kitchen and others.
