= Charles Alverson =

American screenwriter (1935–2020)

- Born: Charles Elgin Alverson; October 13, 1935; Los Angeles, California, U.S.
- Died: January 19, 2020 (aged 84); Zemun, Serbia
- Other name: Chuck Alverson
- Education: San Francisco State College; Columbia University
- Occupations: Novelist; editor; screenwriter
- Notable work: Jabberwocky (1977); Brazil (1985)

Charles Elgin Alverson (October 13, 1935 – January 19, 2020) was an American novelist, editor and screenwriter who sometimes used the byline Chuck Alverson. He co-scripted the 1977 film Jabberwocky.

== Life and career ==
Alverson was born in Los Angeles, California. He grew up in Los Angeles County, and graduated in 1953 from high school in Redondo Beach. After service in the 11th and 82nd Airborne divisions of the U.S. Army, he graduated from San Francisco State College (English, 1960) and Columbia University (Journalism, 1963).

In the early 1960s Alverson was an assistant editor (under Harvey Kurtzman) of Help!, taking over after Gloria Steinem and followed by Terry Gilliam, and then a reporter for The Wall Street Journal. During a break from the WSJ in 1967, he was a "square" (or non-addicted) resident of the anti-drug cult Synanon in Santa Monica, California, for six months. After moving to Britain in 1969, he wrote for Rolling Stone and British newspapers. In 1980, Alverson was managing editor of the British environmentalist magazine Vole, financed by Terry Jones of Monty Python. He was also founding editor of Insight (1981) and GIS Europe (1992).

After living in Radnorshire, mid-Wales from 1970 to 1975, Alverson moved to Cambridge, England, where he was an activist, including a month-long vigil against the United States's bombing of Iraq in 1990 and resistance to Margaret Thatcher's poll tax. He was arrested twice but was not charged.

== Films and books ==
Alverson was co-screenwriter of Terry Gilliam's film Jabberwocky, and co-developer of the story and co-writer (uncredited) of the first draft of the screenplay that became Brazil (1985).

Alverson wrote a dozen novels (four of which have been published in six languages), including the thriller Fighting Back (1973). In Goodey's Last Stand (1975) he introduced San Francisco private eye Joe Goodey, who returned in Not Sleeping Just Dead (1977). The New Yorker described Goodey's Last Stand as "the next best thing to finding a new and unsuspected Raymond Chandler phantasmagoria." In the crime fiction bibliography, Golden Gate Mysteries, Randal Brandt wrote:

Joe Goodey is a San Francisco shamus who appeared in two novels by Charles Alverson. Jonah Webster "Joe" Goodey makes his debut in Goodey's Last Stand (1975). He is a San Francisco homicide detective whose career is cut short when he mistakes the mayor's cousin for a gunman and shoots him. Goodey is then told, in no uncertain terms, to either resign and get the hell out of town, or face charges for attempted murder. Maybe, after things cool down, he can return to the city and get a private investigator's license. His exile from San Francisco is short-lived, however, when he is called back to the city to investigate the murder of a popular North Beach stripper named Tina D'Oro, who also happened to be a special friend of the mayor's. In Not Sleeping, Just Dead (1977), Goodey is hired to investigate the mysterious death of a young woman at a Monterey County commune/rehab clinic called The Institute. Goodey is a wisecracker who would never be accused of having enlightened views about women or minorities, but he is honest and a basically decent guy.

Alverson's credits also included children's books, short stories and short film scripts, some of which have been adapted to comics by the cartoonist John Linton Roberson, including Rapunzel in 2003 and the parody The Story of OH! in 2008.

== Personal life ==
Alverson spent the last 22 years of his life in the village of Parage in Vojvodina, Serbia, with his wife, Živana.

== Archives ==
The Howard Gotlieb Archival Research Center at Boston University houses the Charles Alverson Collection.

== Sources ==
1. Brazil (The Evolution of the 54th Best British Film Ever Made). Orion books Ltd, 2001, edited by Bob McCabe. ISBN 0-7528-3792-3
