= Goodman Beaver =

Fictional character created by Harvey Kurtzman

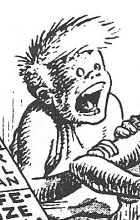
From "Goodman Goes Playboy" (1962)

Goodman Beaver is a fictional character who appears in comics created by American cartoonist Harvey Kurtzman. Goodman is a naive and optimistic Candide-like character, oblivious to the corruption and degeneration around him, and whose stories were vehicles for social satire and pop culture parody. Except for the character's first appearance (which Kurtzman did alone) the stories were written by Kurtzman and drawn by Will Elder.

Goodman first appeared in a story in Harvey Kurtzman's Jungle Book in 1959; the best-remembered were the five strips the Kurtzman–Elder team produced in 1961–62 for the Kurtzman-edited magazine Help! They tend to be in the parodic style Kurtzman developed when he wrote and edited Mad in the 1950s, but with more pointed, adult-oriented satire and much more refined and detailed artwork on Elder's part, filled with numerous visual gags.

The best-known of the Goodman Beaver stories is "Goodman Goes Playboy" (1962), a satire on the hedonistic lifestyle of Hugh Hefner using parodies of Archie comics characters, whose publisher threatened a lawsuit. The issue was settled out of court, and the copyright for the story passed to Archie Comics. Hefner, the actual target of the strip, found it amusing. Kurtzman and Elder developed a female version of Goodman Beaver for Playboy magazine called Little Annie Fanny (1962–1988).

== Characterization ==
Goodman Beaver is a naïve and optimistic character, oblivious to the degeneration around him. According to Kurtzman, the character was partially inspired by Voltaire's Candide and Harold Gray's comic strip character Little Orphan Annie, who, like Goodman, was drawn with blank circles for eyes. Art critic Greil Marcus compares Goodman to Young Goodman Brown in Nathaniel Hawthorne's tale of the same name—both are pure-souled characters who become disillusioned by the depravity they confront in the world.

== Stories ==
Kurtzman wrote five Goodman Beaver stories for his long-time collaborator Will Elder. Most of the stories were in the parodic style Kurtzman had developed as the creator, editor, and writer of Mad, but dealt with more significant issues concerning modernity. Published in the Kurtzman-edited Help! in the early 1960s, they were drawn in Elder's "chickenfat" style, in which he crammed every panel with humorous detail and throwaway gags. Elder cited the Flemish Pieter Bruegel the Elder and the Spanish Diego Velázquez as influences on this style.

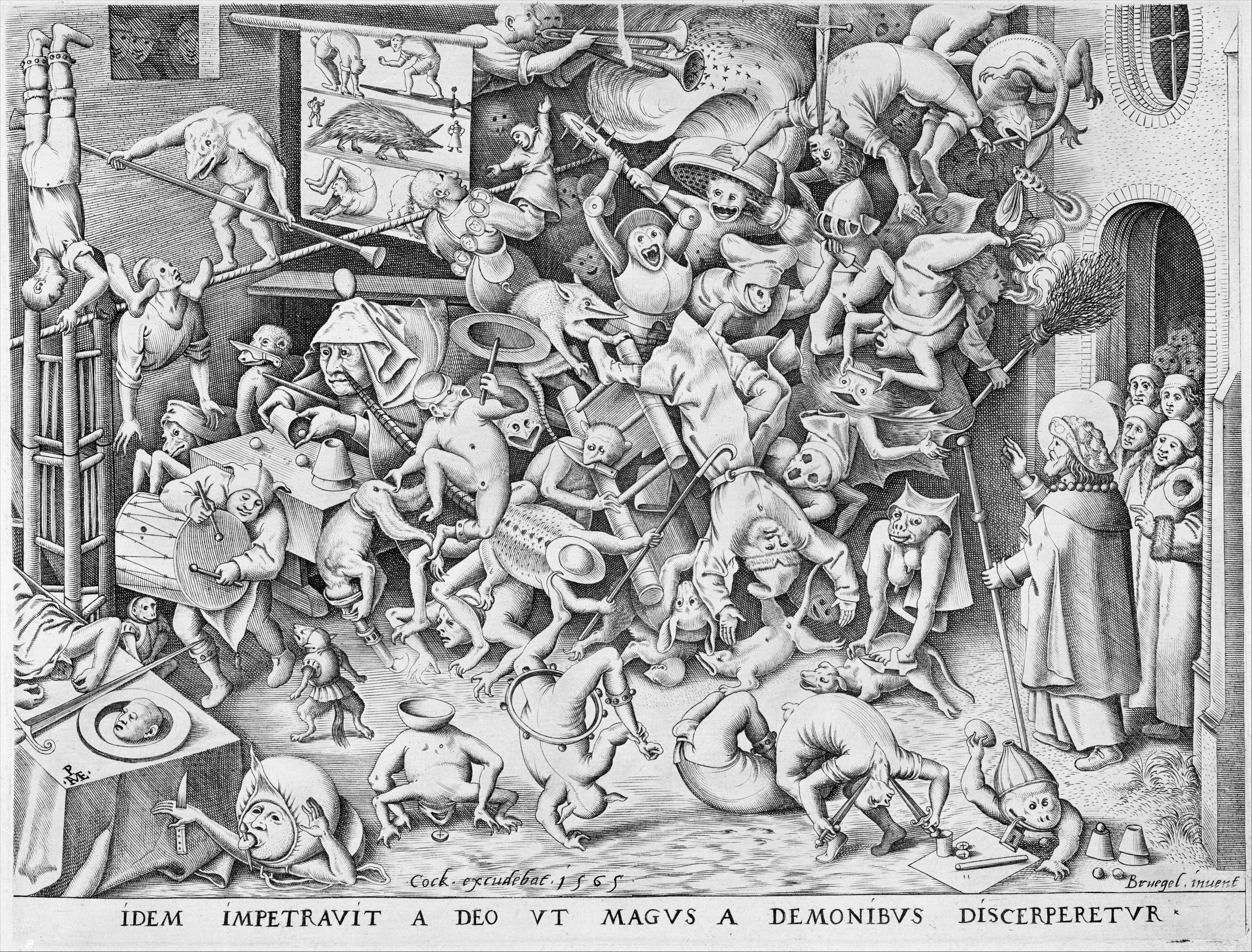
Artists such as Pieter Bruegel the Elder had an influence on Will Elder's detailed drawings. (The Fall of the Magician, Pieter Bruegel the Elder, 1565)

=== "The Organization Man in the Gray Flannel Executive Suit" ===
As an editor hired by Schlock Publications Inc., Goodman loses his youthful idealism when awash in the sea of avarice and selfishness he encounters in the publishing world. In this story Kurtzman used his own personal experiences to satirize the corrupting influence of capitalism and power. Goodman finds himself groping the secretaries, just as the other cynical executives at Schlock do, and ends up stealing from the company.

Goodman was a semi-autobiographical character, reflecting Kurtzman's disillusioning experiences in the publishing industry. Kurtzman's artwork is in an exaggerated cartoon style with round, fluid, elongated characters rendered with loose, fluid, and sketchy brushwork and gray wash. Dialogue is in an expressive, handwriting-like style. Kurtzman blends the verbal and visual aspects of the work—for example, when an enraged Goodman Beaver confronts his diminutive boss Mr. Schlock, Goodman is graphically overwhelmed by Schlock's word balloons, which demonstrates Goodman's helpless subservience and Schlock's effortless psychological dominance over his employees.

=== "Goodman Meets T*rz*n" ===
"Goodman Meets T*rz*n" first appeared in the September 1961 issue of Help!, and was Elder's first take on Goodman Beaver. Set against the backdrop of the fall of European colonialism in the face of the rise of African nationalism, such as in the Kenyan Mau-Mau Uprising, and the spread of the Soviet sphere of influence, the story throws a modern 1960s spin on the romance of jungle adventure as exemplified by the Tarzan tales. Kurtzman sends up T*rz*n's attitude of superiority, as when T*rz*n (Tarzan) confronts an African tribe, or when J*ne (Jane) gives T*rz*n basic English lessons.

Elder's first efforts had Goodman depicted with more monkey-like features—thick, black eyebrows, a large mouth, and small jaw and chin. Kurtzman and Elder desired to have a more "lovable" Goodman, so Elder reworked Goodman's appearance in later stories, redrawing Goodman's features (Note: Elder pasted in the redrawn faces over the original artwork.) to conform with this new look for later reprintings of the "Goodman Meets T*rz*n" story.

=== "Goodman Goes Playboy" ===
Help!'s most famous story was "Goodman Goes Playboy", first published in the February 1962 (Note: The February 1962 issue of Help! appeared in late 1961.) issue of Help! The story satirized Hugh Hefner and his lifestyle while parodying Archie comics in a much more outlandish way than Kurtzman's parody "Starchie" in Mad a decade earlier. Kurtzman called this his favorite Goodman Beaver story, and said that Hefner would point people to it when he wanted to explain to people what Kurtzman's work was about.

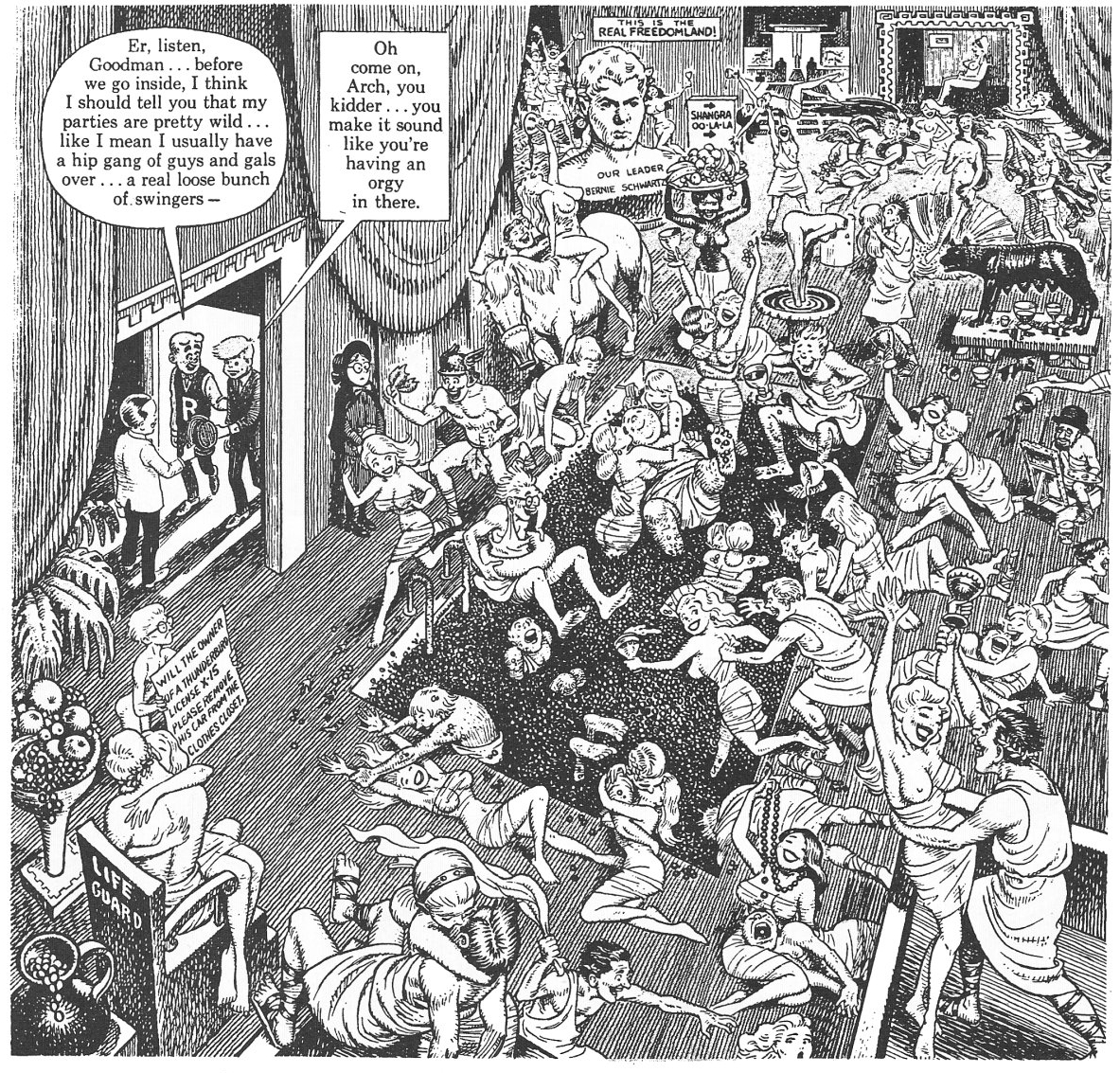
In "Goodman Goes Playboy" (1962), Kurtzman and Elder satirize Hugh Hefner's swinging lifestyle, using parodies of Archie Comics characters.

Goodman has returned to his hometown, and the Archie characters, home from college, are drinking, partying, skirt-chasing hedonists. Jughead is a beatnik, and the others are leading glamorous lifestyles. Archie Andrews parody Archer explains to a behind-the-times Goodman, "You've been away too long. Nowadays, the gang is interested mainly in hip-ness—awareness", rather than keeping up with how the football team is doing. Archer shows Goodman to his place, which must be entered through a staircase built into an enormous statue of a female abdomen. Archer leads Goodman to a Roman-style orgy and has him change into a toga. The party is Archer's last, as he reveals he has signed a pact with the Devil, and the debt (Archer's soul) was due that night.

"Goodman Goes Playboy" appeared in altered form in the book collection Executive's Comic Book in 1962: in the orgy scene the exposed nipples were covered with white ink and the parody Archie characters were altered to obscure the resemblance to characters they were based on in a failed attempt to escape legal action from Archie's publishers.

=== "Goodman, Underwater" ===
While trying to enjoy a book as he floats in a swim ring off a crowded beach, Goodman is interrupted by undersea adventurer Hammer Nelson, who invites Goodman to help him fight underwater crime. Don Quixote-like, the overeager Nelson sees crime where there is none, interrupting swimmers and boaters at play. The pair set out to find a Russian submarine—and find one, but Nelson mistakes it for a monster to be subdued with his speargun. Goodman realizes Nelson's insanity, abandons the adventurer, and returns to his book.

Framed within the story of Don Quixote, "Goodman, Underwater" satirizes Cold War tensions and sets out to deflate the deluded ideals of do-gooders while parodying the 1960s television series Sea Hunt, which starred Lloyd Bridges as Mike Nelson. The illustrations that bookend the story are from 19th-century French artist Gustave Doré's Don Quixote illustrations. The story first appeared in Help! #14 (May 1962).

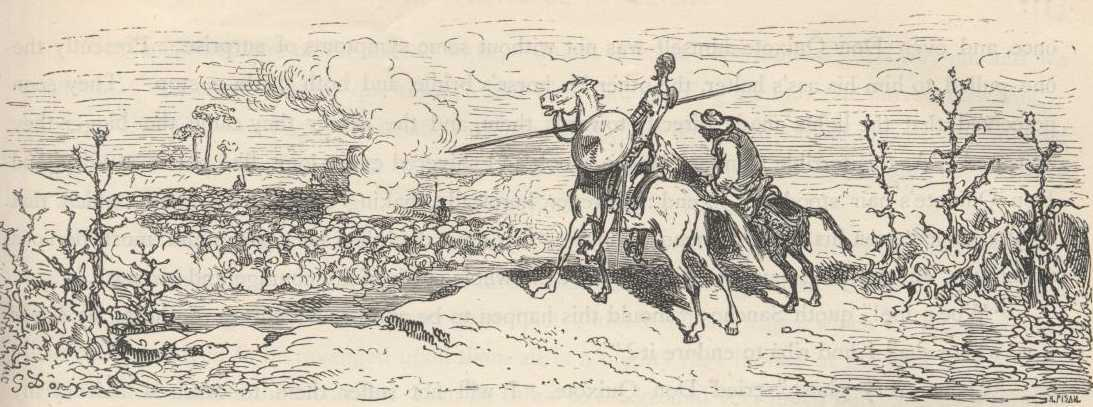
Don Quixote illustrations by Gustave Doré bookend "Goodman, Underwater".

=== "Goodman Meets S*perm*n" ===
In "Goodman Meets S*perm*n", Goodman stumbles across the superhero on a fishing trip. S*perm*n (Superman) has gone into hiding from society, sporting a beard and moccasins. He no longer has the desire to help a society he has lost faith in, and which criticizes him for his good deeds. Goodman takes him back to the city to prove that society is still full of good people. While in the city, Goodman encounters an old woman being attacked by a knife-wielding maniac. Goodman flees in terror, but is stopped by S*perm*n who reveals himself as the old woman in disguise—he had been testing Goodman's selflessness. S*perm*n is horrified and disappointed by the degeneration and corruption he sees in the city, and abandons society again.

First published in Help! #15 (August 1962), Elder described "Goodman Meets S*perm*n" and its detailed splash page as "Marx Brothers on paper. You never knew what to expect", referring to the busy wealth of gags it was filled with. With artwork by Wally Wood, Kurtzman first parodied Superman in "Superduperman" in the fourth issue of Mad in 1953.

=== "Goodman Gets a Gun" ===
Goodman attends a pool party in his hometown Riverdale, fresh from joining the police force. He spots the popular Liz Taylbone, with whom he had been smitten since high school, but he is too passive and timid to draw her attention. After watching a Marlon Brando movie on TV in the lounge he is infused with courage and returns to the party imitating Brando's attitude and mannerisms. He draws the attention of Liz Taylbone and the crowd, but not for his Brando impression as he thinks—rather, they are impressed to learn that, as an off-duty police officer, Goodman is carrying a pistol. The group coaxes him into going with them to a night club known for its rough clientele. When the rough crowd arrives, Goodman's group expects the gun to serve as their protection—until Goodman lets them know his newfound self-confidence drove him to quit the police force two hours earlier. The group abandons Goodman to a thrashing by the thugs.

"Goodman Gets a Gun" appeared first in Help! #16 (November 1962). It was the only Elder-drawn story not to appear in the Executive's Comic Book collection of 1962.

== Publication history ==
Goodman Beaver made his first appearance in Harvey Kurtzman's Jungle Book in 1959, in "The Organization Man in the Gray Flannel Executive Suit". Jungle Book was the first American book of original comics, a mass-market paperback that was the first in a planned series. The book sold poorly, but has been a favorite among Kurtzman fans.

The first Elder-drawn Goodman story appeared in Help! #12 in 1961 and was followed in 1962 with four more stories in Help! #13–16. A Goodman Beaver collection called Executive's Comic Book appeared in 1962 from Macfadden Books. In this paperback collection of four stories—"Goodman Meets T*rz*n", "Goodman Goes Playboy", "Goodman, Underwater", and "Goodman Meets S*perm*n"—the strips were reformatted to one panel per page. Elder extended the artwork of each panel to fit the page dimensions.

Kurtzman approached Hugh Hefner in 1960 with the idea of a comic strip feature for Playboy that would star Goodman Beaver. Until then, Playboy had printed many cartoons, but not a comic strip. After exchanging ideas with Hefner the project was approved, but Goodman Beaver was required to be transformed into a voluptuous female. Kurtzman brought in Will Elder as his primary collaborator on Little Annie Fanny.

In 1984 Kitchen Sink Press published a collection called Goodman Beaver, which reprinted four Kurtzman–Elder stories from Help!—all the Elder-drawn stories except for "Goodman Goes Playboy", which appeared only in short excerpts permitted by fair use exemptions under US copyright law. The book reprinted the elongated versions of those strips that had appeared in Executive's Comic Book. Original artwork for 38 of the 139 reproduced panels were lost; according to Kurtzman, several pages were sent to French magazine Charlie Hebdo for translation and never returned. Kitchen Sink used proofs, photostats, or original magazine appearances for sources from which to reproduce the missing panels.

=== List of original appearances ===
Original Goodman Beaver appearances
Story	Publication	Date
"The Organization Man in the Gray Flannel Executive Suit"	Harvey Kurtzman's Jungle Book	1959
"Goodman Meets T*rz*n"	Help! #12	September 1961
"Goodman Goes Playboy"	Help! #13	February 1962
"Goodman, Underwater"	Help! #14	May 1962
"Goodman Meets S*perm*n"	Help! #15	August 1962
"Goodman Gets a Gun"	Help! #16	November 1962

== Reception and legacy ==
Kurtzman had avoided drawing legal fire from the litigious DC Comics and Edgar Rice Burroughs, Inc. when he parodied their copyrighted properties, but the bawdy and risque depictions of the Archie characters in "Goodman Goes Playboy" provoked legal action from Archie publisher John L. Goldwater, who had earlier played a role in founding the comics industry's self-censorship body, the Comics Magazine Association of America.

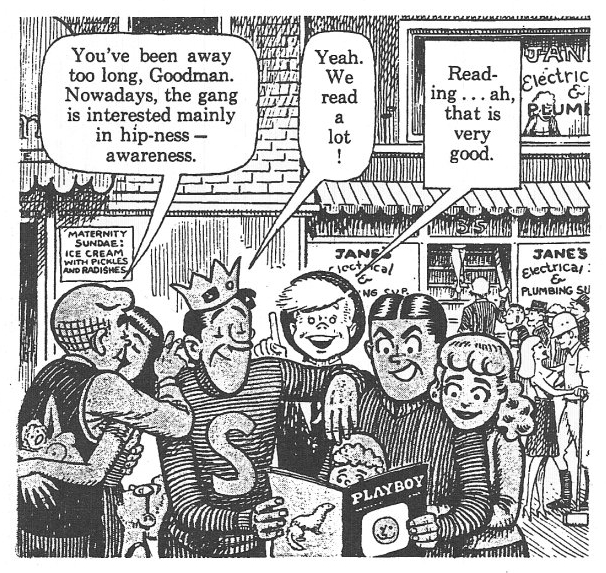
The parodic depictions of Archie Comics characters in "Goodman Goes Playboy" prompted a lawsuit from the characters' publisher.

Help! publisher Jim Warren received a letter on 6 December 1961 accusing the magazine of copyright infringement and demanding removal of the offending issue from newsstands. Warren's lawyer believed they could succeed if they fought the suit, but the legal costs would make it a "Pyrrhic victory", and thus recommended settling out of court. Warren could not have the magazine recalled, but he agreed to pay Archie Comics $1000 and ran a note of apology in a subsequent issue of Help!—the August 1962 issue, in which appeared another character franchise parody, "Goodman Meets S*perm*n". Warren's action disappointed Kurtzman, who felt that giving in to such censorship set a "terrible precedent", and amounted to a kind of prostitution. (Note: As Kurtzman stated, he believed settling the lawsuit was "very, very wrong ... very bad. I thought I had really prostituted myself by going along".)

When the story was reprinted in the book collection Executive Comic Book in 1962, Elder modified the artwork to obscure the appearance of the Archie characters. Archie Comics found the characters' appearances still too close to their copyrighted properties and threatened another lawsuit. Kurtzman and Elder settled out of court by handing over the copyright to the story. Archie Comics held on to the copyright and refused to allow the story to be republished.

The actual target of "Goodman Goes Playboy" had been Hefner, who loved it. Kurtzman began working for Hefner again soon afterwards. The strip Kurtzman produced, Little Annie Fanny, is often thought of as a compromise—virtuosic in its visuals, but lacking in content in comparison to the Goodman Beaver stories. R. Fiore and other commentators have considered this ironic in light of the Faustian theme of "Goodman Goes Playboy".

In June 1983 Denis Kitchen requested the right to reprint the story as part of a planned Goodman Beaver collection. Archie Enterprises chairman Michael J. Silberkleit responded that publishing a story that included the likenesses of the Archie characters would be "a serious breach of copyright and trademark law". When the company learned that Kitchen planned to publish the story with the pages reduced in size and the characters' faces blacked out, Archie Enterprises threatened another lawsuit, and Kitchen dropped the story from the collection, which appeared in 1984. Kitchen went as far as to have the book's cover redone, as the planned one had incorporated a "Goodman Goes Playboy" panel in the background.

Publisher and critic Gary Groth wrote that Elder's artwork in the Goodman Beaver stories "clinched his reputation as the cartoon Brueghel [sic] with his intricate portraits of a world cheerfully going mad". Elder considered the stories to be the funniest of his collaborations with Kurtzman, though he said that towards the end of the run he was getting tired of the painstaking work he put into the drawings. The stories placed sixty-fourth on The Comics Journal's "Top 100 English-Language Comics of the Century" in 1999, along with four other works with which Kurtzman was involved. Late-1990s talk of a Goodman Beaver feature film or television series circulated, but the Kurtzman estate was uninterested.

After Comics Journal co-owner Gary Groth discovered that Archie Comics had let the copyright on "Goodman Goes Playboy" expire, he had the story reprinted in The Comics Journal #262 (September 2004). It was also made available as a PDF file on the magazine's website. The story has yet to appear in any reprint collection since the lapse of copyright.
