= Hey Look! =

Comic book fillers by Harvey Kurtzman

Hey Look! is a series of one-page comic book fillers by American cartoonist Harvey Kurtzman, produced between 1946 and 1949 for Timely Comics.

== Overview ==
Hey Look! is one of the few projects on which Kurtzman handled all of the writing and art chores. The series starred an unnamed "big guy" and "little guy".

While the pages showed the budding talent of the young Kurtzman, the genius he would display later was not evident in the early strips. According to Kurtzman, "the first was horrible alongside the last".

== Publication history ==
Harvey Kurtzman had been making crossword puzzles for publisher Martin Goodman in the 1940s. A distant relative of Goodman's, Stan Lee, worked as an editor for Goodman's Timely Comics (a precursor to Marvel Comics). He offered Kurtzman work doing one-page fillers. Lee gave the strip its title. Kurtzman produced 150 of the strips between 1946 and 1949.

In 1991, underground cartoonist Denis Kitchen's Kitchen Sink Press published a volume reprinting the complete Hey Look! series (ISBN 087816152X).

== Reception and legacy ==
The Comics Journal listed Hey Look! at #63 on their list of The Top 100 (English Language) Comics of the 20th Century. Critic Eric Reynolds in his appreciation of Hey Look! wrote "the Hey Look! strips are amongst the purest expression of cartooning ever put to paper". Animator Vincent Waller made an adaptation of Hey Look! for Oh Yeah! Cartoons in 1998.
