= United States Senate Subcommittee on Juvenile Delinquency =

U.S. Senate subcommittee to investigate juvenile delinquency

The United States Senate Subcommittee on Juvenile Delinquency was established by the United States Senate in 1953 to investigate the problem of juvenile delinquency.

== Background ==
The subcommittee was a unit of the United States Senate Judiciary Committee and was created by a motion of Senator Robert Hendrickson, a Republican from New Jersey. Its initial budget was $44,000. The first members of the subcommittee consisted of Senator Hendrickson, and Senators Estes Kefauver (Democrat from Tennessee), Thomas C. Hennings, Jr. (Democrat from Missouri), and William Langer (Republican from North Dakota). Senator Hendrickson was initially the chair of the committee but was later replaced as chair by Senator Kefauver.

== 1954 comic book hearings ==
The public hearings took place on April 21, 22, and June 4, 1954, in New York. They focused on particularly graphic "crime and horror" comic books of the day, and their potential impact on juvenile delinquency. When publisher William Gaines contended that he sold only comic books of good taste, Kefauver entered into evidence one of Gaines' comics (Crime SuspenStories #22 [April-May 1954]), which showed a dismembered woman's head on its cover. The exchange between Gaines and Kefauver led to a front-page story in The New York Times the following day.

Chief Counsel Herbert Beaser asked: "Then you think a child cannot in any way, shape, or manner, be hurt by anything that the child reads or sees?"

William Gaines responded: "I do not believe so."

Beaser: "There would be no limit, actually, to what you'd put in the magazines?"

Gaines: "Only within the bounds of good taste."

Sen. Kefauver: "Here is your May issue. This seems to be a man with a bloody ax holding a woman's head up which has been severed from her body. Do you think that's in good taste?"

Gaines: "Yes sir, I do — for the cover of a horror comic. A cover in bad taste, for example, might be defined as holding her head a little higher so that blood could be seen dripping from it and moving the body a little further over so that the neck of the body could be seen to be bloody."

Kefauver (doubtful): "You've got blood coming out of her mouth."

Gaines: "A little."

What none of the senators knew was that Gaines had already cleaned up the cover of this issue. Artist Johnny Craig's first draft included those very elements that Gaines had said were in "bad taste" and had him clean it up before publication.

Because of the unfavorable press coverage resulting from the hearings, the comic book industry adopted the Comics Code Authority, a self-regulatory ratings code that was initially adopted by nearly all comic publishers and continued to be used by some comics until 2011. In the immediate aftermath of the hearings, several publishers were forced to revamp their schedules and drastically censor or even cancel many popular long-standing comic series.

== See also ==
- Seduction of the Innocent by Fredric Wertham
