= Bernard Shir-Cliff =

Bernard W. Shir-Cliff (November 7, 1924 – February 28, 2017) was an editor for Ballantine Books, Contemporary Books, Warner Books and other publishers, who also translated books and later became a well-known literary agent. As a senior editor at Warner Books, he was responsible for the huge publishing success of sex therapist and author Dr. Ruth Westheimer, which she writes about in her autobiography, All in a Lifetime (2001).

== Early life and education ==
Born in Troy, New York, Shir-Cliff attended Mountain Lakes High School and graduated from Columbia University, where he was the editor-in-chief of the humorist magazine, Jester of Columbia.

== Career ==
As the editor at Ballantine in the 1950s and 1960s, he handled the Zacherley anthologies, the paperback of Hunter S. Thompson's Hell's Angels, Harvey Kurtzman's The Mad Reader and other early Mad paperbacks. He made four contributions to Mad and also contributed to other magazines edited by Kurtzman, such as "The Karate Lesson" in Kurtzman's Help! (October 1964). He satirized Sports Illustrated in the second issue of Kurtzman's Trump magazine.

In 1956 he edited the humor anthology, The Wild Reader (Ballantine), featuring essays, poems and satirical pieces by Robert Benchley, Art Buchwald, Tom Lehrer, John Lardner, Shepherd Mead, Ogden Nash, S.J. Perelman, Frank Sullivan, James Thurber and others. The 154-page paperback was illustrated with cartoons by Kelly Freas who also did the front cover.

The screenplay of Roger Vadim's Les Liaisons Dangereuses (1959) was translated by Shir-Cliff for publication by Ballantine in 1962. He also was the co-translator with Oscar De Liso of the screenplay for Federico Fellini's La Dolce Vita (Ballantine, 1961).

In the early 1980s, when he was editor-in-chief of Warner Books, Shir-Cliff commented on the publishing recession and lower reprint prices:

You don't see the five to six million copies sold–it's more like three million for a big book. In five years, the book may reach six million, but you don't acquire it with that long-range figure in mind. Another reason is that some massmarket paperbacks have reached $4.95, and that may be the limit. The recession has affected paperback purchases. Where a reader might have bought two books, now he'll buy one–the tried-and-true author.

Until his recent retirement, Shir-Cliff was an agent handling such books as John R. Dann's Song of the Earth (2006).
