= William Gaines =

American publisher (1922–1992)

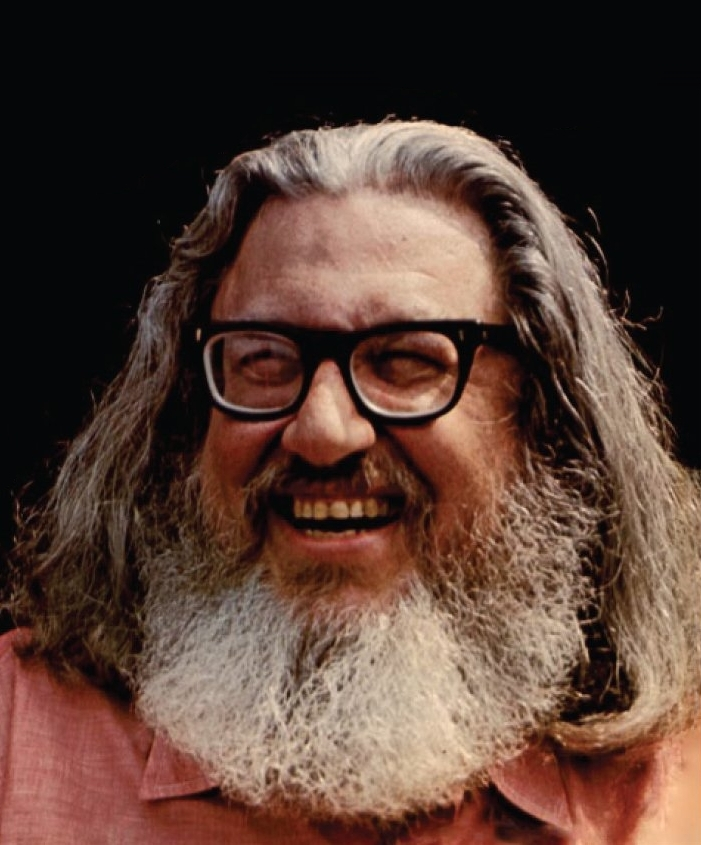
- Gaines c. 1972
- Born: William Maxwell Gaines; March 1, 1922 New York City, US
- Died: June 3, 1992 (aged 70) New York, US
- Areas: Writer, Editor, Publisher
- Notable works: Mad; EC Comics "Master Race"
- Awards: Inkpot Award (1990)

William Maxwell "Bill" Gaines (/ɡeɪnz/; March 1, 1922 – June 3, 1992) was an American publisher and co-editor of EC Comics. Following a shift in EC's direction in 1950, Gaines presided over what became an artistically influential and historically important line of mature-audience comics. He published the satirical magazine Mad for over 40 years.

He was posthumously inducted into the comic book industry's Will Eisner Comic Book Hall of Fame (1993) and the Jack Kirby Hall of Fame (1997).

== Early life ==
Gaines was born and raised in Homecrest, Brooklyn, New York, to a Jewish household. His father was Max Gaines, who as publisher of the All-American Comics division of DC Comics was also an influential figure in the history of comics. The elder Gaines tested the idea of packaging and selling comics on newsstands in 1933, and Gaines accepted William Moulton Marston's proposal in 1941 for the first successful female superhero, Wonder Woman.

As World War II began, Gaines was rejected by the U.S. Army, the U.S. Coast Guard and the U.S. Navy, so he went to his local draft board and requested to be drafted. He trained as a U.S. Army Air Corps photographer at Lowry Field in Denver. However, when he was assigned to an Oklahoma City field without a photographic facility, he wound up on permanent KP duty. As he explained in 1976 to Bill Craig of Stars and Stripes, "Being an eater, this assignment was a real pleasure for me. There were four of us, and we always found all the choice bits the cooks had hidden away. We'd be frying up filet mignon and ham steaks every night. The hours were great, too. I think it was eight hours on and 40 off." Stationed at DeRidder Army Airfield in Louisiana, he was reassigned to Marshall Airfield in Kansas and then to Governors Island, New York. Leaving the service in 1946, he returned home to complete his chemistry studies at Brooklyn Polytechnic, but soon transferred to New York University, intent on obtaining a teaching certificate. In 1947, he was in his senior year at NYU when his father was killed in a motorboat accident on Lake Placid. Instead of becoming a chemistry teacher, he took over the family business, EC Comics.

== Career ==
=== Senate Subcommittee investigation ===
With the publication of Dr. Fredric Wertham's Seduction of the Innocent, comic books like those that Gaines published attracted the attention of the U.S. Congress. In 1954, Gaines testified before the Senate Subcommittee on Juvenile Delinquency. In the following exchanges, he is addressed first by Chief Counsel Herbert Beaser, and then by Senator Estes Kefauver:

Beaser: "Is the sole test of what you would put into your magazine whether it sells? Is there any limit you can think of that you would not put in a magazine because you thought a child should not see or read about it?"
Gaines: "No, I wouldn't say that there is any limit for the reason you outlined. My only limits are the bounds of good taste, what I consider good taste."
Beaser: "Then you think a child cannot in any way, in any way, shape, or manner, be hurt by anything that a child reads or sees?"
Gaines: "I don't believe so."
Beaser: "There would be no limit actually to what you put in the magazines?"
Gaines: "Only within the bounds of good taste."
Beaser: "Your own good taste and saleability?"
Gaines: "Yes."
Kefauver: "Here is your May 22 issue [Crime SuspenStories No. 22, cover date May]. This seems to be a man with a bloody axe holding a woman's head up which has been severed from her body. Do you think that is in good taste?"
Gaines: "Yes sir, I do, for the cover of a horror comic. A cover in bad taste, for example, might be defined as holding the head a little higher so that the neck could be seen dripping blood from it, and moving the body over a little further so that the neck of the body could be seen to be bloody."
Kefauver: "You have blood coming out of her mouth."
Gaines: "A little."
Kefauver: "Here is blood on the axe. I think most adults are shocked by that."

=== End of EC Comics and conversion of Mad format ===
Gaines converted Mad to a magazine in 1955, partly to retain the services of its talented editor Harvey Kurtzman, who had received offers from elsewhere. The change enabled Mad to escape the strictures of the Comics Code Authority. Kurtzman left Gaines's employ a year later anyway and was replaced by Al Feldstein, who had been Gaines's most prolific editor during the EC Comics run. (For details of this event and the subsequent debates about it, see Kurtzman's editorship of Mad.) Feldstein oversaw Mad from 1955 through 1986, as Gaines went on to a long and profitable career as a publisher of satire and enemy of bombast.

To celebrate a circulation milestone of 1 million magazines, Gaines took his staff to Haiti. In Haiti the magazine had a single subscriber. Gaines personally delivered his subscription renewal card.

Despite his largesse, Gaines had a penny-pinching side. He would frequently stop meetings to find out who had called a particular long-distance phone number. Longtime Mad editor Nick Meglin called Gaines a "living contradiction" in 2011, saying, "He was singularly the cheapest man in the world, and the most generous." Meglin described his experience of asking Gaines for a raise of $3 a week; after rejecting the request, the publisher then treated Meglin to an expensive dinner at one of New York's best restaurants. Recalled Meglin: "The check came, and I said, 'That's the whole raise!' "And Bill said, 'I like good conversation and good food. I don't enjoy giving raises.'" (According to veteran Golden Age comics artist Sheldon Moldoff, Gaines was not too fond of paying percentages, either.)

In his memoir Good Days and Mad (1994), Mad writer Dick DeBartolo recalls several anecdotes that characterize Gaines as a generous gourmand who liked practical jokes, and who enjoyed good-natured verbal abuse from his staffers.

=== 1960–1992 ===
In 1961, Gaines sold Mad to Premier Industries, a maker of venetian blinds, but remained publisher until the day he died, and served as a buffer between the magazine and its corporate interests. He largely stayed out of the magazine's production, often viewing content just before the issue was shipped to the printer. "My staff and contributors create the magazine," declared Gaines. "What I create is the atmosphere." Around 1964, Premier sold Mad to Independent News, a division of National Periodical Publications, the publisher of DC Comics. In 1967, Kinney National Company purchased National Periodical, and then in 1969, they bought Warner Brothers. In 1972, Kinney became Warner Communications.

One of Gaines' last televised interviews was as a guest on the December 7, 1991, episode of Beyond Vaudeville.

Circa 2008, director John Landis and screenwriter Joel Eisenberg planned a biopic called Ghoulishly Yours, William M. Gaines, with Al Feldstein serving as a creative consultant. The film, however, did not get past pre-production.

== Death ==
On June 3, 1992, Gaines died in his sleep at his home in New York at the age of 70. He had been in ill health in recent years and used a pacemaker.

== Personal life ==
Gaines's first marriage was arranged by his mother. He was married to his second cousin Hazel Grieb. They announced their plans to divorce in August 1947. According to Completely Mad: A History of the Comic Book and Magazine by Maria Reidelbach, Gaines married Nancy Siegel in 1955. They had three children, Cathy (1958), Wendy (1959), and Christopher (1961). They divorced in 1971. In 1987 he married Anne Griffiths. They remained married until his death in 1992.

Gaines was an atheist since the age of 12; he once told a reporter that his was probably the only home in America in which the children were brought up to believe in Santa Claus, but not in God.
