= Will Elder =

American illustrator (1921–2008)

- Will Elder self-portrait
- Born: Wolf William Eisenberg; September 22, 1921 Bronx, New York, U.S.
- Died: May 15, 2008 (aged 86) Rockleigh, New Jersey, U.S.
- Notable works: Mad; Little Annie Fanny
- Awards: Inkpot Award (2000)

William Elder (born Wolf William Eisenberg; September 22, 1921 – May 15, 2008) was an American illustrator and comic book artist who worked in numerous areas of commercial art but is best known for a frantically funny cartoon style that helped launch Harvey Kurtzman's Mad comic book in 1952.

Playboy publisher Hugh Hefner said, "He was a zany, and a lovable one." Longtime Mad writer-cartoonist Al Jaffee called Elder "Absolutely brilliant... he was the star from the beginning. He had a feel for the kind of satire that eventually spread everywhere."

Elder was inducted into the Comic Book Hall of Fame in 2003. In 2018, the Comics Reporter's Tom Spurgeon described Elder as "an amazing artist, a sneaky spot-holder on the top 20 of the 20th century".

== Early years ==
Born Wolf William Eisenberg in the Bronx, New York, Elder was known in his teen years as Wolfie. Elder would later joke about his poor slum upbringing: "The people who had garbage were rich; they had something to throw out." Elder attended New York's High School of Music and Art together with future Mad artists Harvey Kurtzman, John Severin, Al Jaffee and Al Feldstein.

During World War II, he served as a part of the 668th Engineer Company (Topographical) of the First Army, as part of the mapmaking team in advance of the invasion of Normandy. Sometime after returning home, he adopted the name Will Elder.

== Career ==
In the late 1940s, Elder and former classmate Kurtzman teamed with Charles Stern to form the Charles William Harvey Studio, creating comics between 1948 and 1951 for Prize Comics and other publishers. At EC Comics, he inked Severin's pencils on stories for Weird Fantasy, Two-Fisted Tales, Frontline Combat and other titles.

When Kurtzman created Mad in 1952, Elder's wacky panels, filled with background gags, immediately attracted attention, first with "Ganefs!" in Mad's debut issue but especially in the second issue with "Mole!", satirizing the popular mid-1940s Dick Tracy villain named "The Mole". The Mad lampoon depicted the successive efforts of prisoner Melvin Mole to tunnel away from the prison, first with a spoon, then with a toothpick and finally with a nostril hair.

The wild exaggeration in this story left such a strong impression that the character was sometimes quoted ("Dig! Dig!") and even given a homage years later in a Psychology Today illustration; sixty-two years later, Mad's 2014 parody of the television prison series Orange Is the New Black included the image of Elder's Mole tunneling to freedom.

According to Jaffee, Elder "could have been the world's greatest forger". Elder had a chameleon-like talent for mimicking the precise styles of other cartoonists, which made the satiric effect stronger. This ability was showcased in such pieces as "Mickey Rodent!" (a takeoff on Mickey Mouse and Disney in general), "Starchie!" (Archie Comics), "Bringing Back Father!" (George McManus' Bringing Up Father strip), "Gasoline Valley!" (Frank King's Gasoline Alley), and others. Such was Elder's ability that some of these parodies featured specific observations about the source materials' art styles, with Elder switching illustrative gears in midpanel.

Elder had this to say about his mimicry:

Through imitation, I found an avenue of expression... if you're going to make an imitation of something, a facsimile, it's got to be convincing. When you convince people, then you can turn the tables and shock them as a result. Accuracy was part of it. If I could fool people to think that this was the real item, and then suddenly make them realize at the last moment that it wasn't, that in itself is surprisingly funny.

Elder's signature style, with extra humorous detail added upon humorous detail, is routinely described as "chicken fat," a reference to soup preparation. As Elder told an interviewer, "The term just came out of what we both [Kurtzman and Elder] knew were the parts of the strip that gave it more flavor but did very little to advance the storyline. That's what Chicken Fat does... it advances the flavor of the soup and, as we all know now, too much chicken fat will kill you!"

Elder's rampant insertion of background gags set the tone for the comic book, quickly spreading into the panels of his fellow artists and imitators of Mad. Kurtzman described their collaborative process: "I would write a story, and as if by magic, all the empty spaces would get filled in by sub-jokes... he was an inexhaustible source." In 2004, Elder told an interviewer, "In Mad, Harvey never rejected any of my little extras in the story. I think he was much harder on the other artists, because my stuff made him laugh. As soon as he laughed I think he forgot that it didn't belong in the story!"

Some viewers believe Elder's style of separate foreground and background actions was mimicked by Louis Malle in his 1960 film Zazie dans le Métro, in a restaurant scene where the background action begins to take precedence over the main character. “I thought people would notice and would laugh," said Malle, "but nobody did." Elder had drawn the article "Restaurant!" in 1954; the Mad piece was about a family and its meal, but the backgrounds were filled with numerous sight gags including the Bufferin aspirin ad campaign, hieroglyphics, a mop substituting for spaghetti, the RCA Victor dog, a toddler eating the plates, and a full coat rack including Viking helmet and deer antlers. Monty Python's Terry Gilliam said of Elder, "I don't know if anybody's really worked at that level as intensely as Willy did. And it never seemed to distract from the center." 21st-century Mad cartoonist Evan Dorkin put it more simply: "If God is in the details, Will Elder channeled God."

Elder also drew for EC's other humor comic, Panic. His illustrated version of Clement Clarke Moore's "T'was the Night Before Christmas" included several irreverent images, including a "Just Divorced!" sign hanging on the back of Santa Claus' sleigh. As a result, sales of Panic were banned in the state of Massachusetts. Elder included a self-caricature, being spun around on Santa Claus' hip as Santa "filled all the stockings; then turned with a jerk"—the jerk, of course, is Elder.

== Sense of humor ==
Elder was known as an inveterate prankster. As a child, he once cut out paper silhouettes of a man carrying a knife and a woman. Attaching them to a rotating record turntable, he projected their image onto the windowshade, and began screaming. People on the outside of the building saw what they thought was an assailant chasing his victim around the room. EC colorist Marie Severin recalled, "Will used to have this painting of a deer... I guess it was one of those 5-and-10-cent store things. It had a deer, a mountain, some trees, a path, flowers and the like, and he'd change it with the seasons! If it was winter he'd paint snow on the deer, and then he would paint over that and put the sun out for the springtime with flowers coming up." Kurtzman recounted the time Elder and his playmates found a stock of fresh meat as a child: "These kids collected a bunch of clothes and they dressed the meat in clothes and spread the combination of meat and clothes along the right-of-way for about half a mile on the railroad tracks. Then Willy started shrieking at the top of his voice that Mikey had fallen down onto the railroad tracks. Naturally every woman for miles around who had a son named Mike went out of their mind, seeing this mess of clothes and meat along the tracks... This is the kind of kid that Willy was." Years later, Elder still had a gruesome side to his humor, sending his wife a heart from a slaughterhouse as a Valentine's Day gift.

By all accounts, Elder's humor was compulsive. Al Jaffee described a portrait Elder once painted of his son: "It was a beautiful painting. It was all in very somber blues and black tones, very dark and brooding. After he finished it, he couldn't resist putting two little red dots on the kid's neck, as if a vampire had been there. He was always driven by the notion that something should be funny."

== Post-Mad career ==
Elder collaborated frequently throughout his career with Kurtzman. After leaving Mad in 1957, the two worked together on a string of short-lived humor magazines: Trump, Humbug and Help!. For Help!, Elder and Kurtzman created Goodman Beaver, a well-meaning naif whose trust in human nature and goodness were forever being undercut. One installment depicted the characters of Archie Comics as thoughtless hedonists, and was titled "Goodman Beaver Goes Playboy!". This parody resulted in a lawsuit from Archie Comics. Kurtzman and Elder had previously irritated the Archie publisher with a parody in Mad ("Starchie!"). Archie Comics ended up with possession of the story's copyright. When the full Goodman Beaver series was reprinted by Kitchen Sink Press, the story could not legally be included. However, after Archie Comics failed to renew its copyright, the original "Goodman Beaver Goes Playboy!" went into public domain and was published in Fantagraphics' Comics Journal.

Publisher and critic Gary Groth wrote that Elder's artwork in the Goodman Beaver stories "clinched his reputation as the cartoon Brueghel [sic] with his intricate portraits of a world cheerfully going mad". Elder later talked to The Comics Journal about the Goodman Beaver series, saying, "It was the best thing I ever did."

While the owners of Archie had taken offense, the owner of Playboy did not. Hugh Hefner, a fan of Kurtzman and "Goodman Beaver", commissioned Kurtzman and Elder to create a similar but more lavish strip for Playboy. The result was Little Annie Fanny. Like Goodman Beaver, Little Annie Fanny was a pure-of-heart innocent; unlike him, she was regularly divested of her clothing. The Annie Fanny series (107 stories in all) was irregularly published in the back of Playboy for more than a quarter of a century from October 1962 through September 1988. In 2001, Dark Horse Comics published the trade paperback collections Playboy's Little Annie Fanny, Volume 1 (ISBN 1-56971-519-X) and Playboy's Little Annie Fanny, Volume 2: 1970–1988 (ISBN 1-56971-520-3).

Elder's advertising art, caricatures, cartoons, illustrations and stories were collected in the 392-page career retrospective, Will Elder: The Mad Playboy of Art (Fantagraphics, 2003; ISBN 1-56097-603-9). The follow-up book, Chicken Fat (also by Fantagraphics), was published in 2006 and compiles drawings, sketches, cartoons and doodles by Elder, most of which had never been published. In 2009, Fantagraphics published a complete boxed collection of Humbug.

Elder died on May 15, 2008, from complications due to Parkinson's disease in Rockleigh, New Jersey.

Elder was posthumously inducted into the Harvey Awards Hall of Fame in 2019 at New York Comic Con, alongside fellow Mad contributors Jack Davis, Marie Severin, John Severin, and Ben Oda.

== See also ==
- List of cartoonists
- List of illustrators
