= Help! (magazine) =

Defunct American magazine

- Vol. 1, No. 11 (June 1961)
- Editor: Harvey Kurtzman
- Categories: Satirical magazine
- Frequency: monthly
- First issue: August 1960
- Final issue Number: September 1965; 26
- Company: Warren Publishing
- Country: United States
- Language: English

Help! was an American satire magazine edited by Harvey Kurtzman and published by Warren Publishing from 1960 to 1965. It was Kurtzman's longest-running magazine project after leaving Mad and EC Publications.

During its five years of operation, Help! was chronically underfunded yet remained innovative, combining comics, photo-based fumetti, satire, and prose features while introducing several young creators who later became influential in underground comix.

== Publication history ==
In starting Help!, Kurtzman brought along several artists from his Mad collaborations, including Will Elder, Jack Davis, John Severin and Al Jaffee.

Working with a minimal budget, Kurtzman relied on a combination of cheap up-and-coming talent, favors called in to "name" friends (such as cover poses by Jackie Gleason, Mort Sahl or Jerry Lewis) and inexpensive page-fillers (such as inserting dialogue balloons into news photos and publicity stills).

A total of 26 issues of Help! were printed before the magazine folded in 1965. Volume one (August 1960—September 1961) had 12 issues, while volume two (February 1962—September 1965) had 14 issues. Sequential numbering returned with issue #21, the "Fifth Anniversary Issue", following Vol. 2, No. 7.

== Staff and contributors ==
Kurtzman's assistants included Charles Alverson, Terry Gilliam and Gloria Steinem; the last was helpful in gathering the celebrity comedians who appeared on the covers and the fumetti strips the magazine ran along with more traditional comics and text pieces.

Among the then little-known performers in the fumetti were John Cleese, Woody Allen and Milt Kamen; better-known performers such as Orson Bean were also known to participate. Some of the fumetti were scripted by Bernard Shir-Cliff. (At Help!, Gilliam met Cleese for the first time, resulting in their collaboration years later on Monty Python's Flying Circus.)

The magazine introduced young talents who went on to influential careers in underground comix as well as the mainstream: among them Robert Crumb, Gilbert Shelton and Jay Lynch. Algis Budrys and other science fiction writers were regular contributors of prose and scripts to the magazine.

== Content and format ==
Somewhat more adult and risqué than Mad, Help! was nonetheless less sexually explicit or taboo-breaking than the contemporaneous The Realist or the later underground comix and National Lampoon.

One of the magazine’s recurring comic features was Goodman Beaver, created by Kurtzman and illustrated by Elder. The character was a naïve and well-meaning young man who wanders through morally dubious situations; the series satirized American popular culture and social hypocrisy through Beaver's innocent reactions to the behavior around him. Goodman has been compared to Voltaire's Candide.

John Cleese appeared in a Terry Gilliam fumetto written by David Crossley, "Christopher's Punctured Romance". The tale concerns a man who is shocked to learn that his daughter's new "Barbee" doll has "titties"; however, he falls in love with the doll and has an affair. Gilliam appeared on two covers of Help! and along with the rest of the creative team, appeared in crowd scenes in several fumetti.

In addition to satire comics and fumetti, Help! published a number of light-hearted works of comics journalism, including pieces by Jack Davis, Arnold Roth, and Robert Crumb.

== Archie Comics dispute ==
The magazine got into some hot water in 1962, thanks to a story in the February 1962 issue starring Goodman Beaver in which the Archie Comics cast were seduced by the Playboy lifestyle and sold their souls to Satan (aka Playboy founder Hugh Hefner). Archie Comics sued Warren, and settled out of court for $1,000 and a published apology.

The dispute resurfaced in December when the story was reprinted in a book; another settlement was reached in 1963 with Kurtzman and Elder promising never to reprint the story again, and ceding the copyright to Archie Comics. At some point, Archie Comics failed to renew the copyright. This lapse allowed The Comics Journal to reprint the story in its entirety in September 2004.

== Legacy ==
Help! served as a bridge between the satirical comic tradition of Mad and the more experimental underground comix movement that emerged later in the 1960s. The magazine helped introduce a number of artists and writers who later became influential figures in alternative comics.

Coincidentally, the magazine's title was supplanted in popular culture in the same year that it folded: the Beatles released a song, an album, and a feature-length film all bearing the title "Help!" in the summer of 1965. (The song was the title track of the album and the opening song of the film.)

== Notable contributors ==
- Woody Allen
- Charles Alverson
- Orson Bean
- Algis Budrys
- John Cleese
- Robert Crumb
- Jack Davis
- Will Elder
- Terry Gilliam
- Al Jaffee
- Milt Kamen
- Harvey Kurtzman
- Jay Lynch
- John Severin
- Gilbert Shelton
- Gloria Steinem
- Heinrich Kley
