= The Comics Journal =

American magazine

- Jay Lynch self-portrait for The Comics Journal #114 (February 1987)
- Editor-in-chief: Gary Groth (since 1977)
- Categories: Comics criticism, history, interviews
- Frequency: Twice a year
- Publisher: Fantagraphics Books
- Founded: 1976
- First issue: 1977
- Country: United States
- Based in: Seattle, Washington
- Language: English
- Website: www.tcj.com
- ISSN: 0194-7869

The Comics Journal, often abbreviated TCJ, is an American magazine of news and criticism pertaining to comic books, comic strips and graphic novels. Known for its lengthy interviews with comic creators, pointed editorials and scathing reviews of the products of the mainstream comics industry, the magazine promotes the view that comics are a fine art, meriting broader cultural respect, and thus should be evaluated with higher critical standards.

== History ==
In 1976, Gary Groth and Michael Catron acquired The Nostalgia Journal, a small competitor of the newspaper adzine The Buyer's Guide for Comics Fandom. At the time, Groth and Catron were already publishing Sounds Fine, a similarly formatted adzine for record collectors that they had started after producing Rock 'N Roll Expo '75, held during the July 4 weekend in 1975 in Washington, D.C.

The publication was relaunched as The New Nostalgia Journal with issue No. 27 (July 1976), and with issue No. 32 (January 1977), it became The Comics Journal ("a quality publication for the serious comics fan"). Issue No. 37 (December 1977) adopted a magazine format. With issue #45 (March 1979), the magazine moved to a monthly schedule; at that point it had a circulation of 10,000.

In addition to lengthy interviews with comics industry figures, the Journal has always published criticism—and received it in turn. Starting in the early 2000s, the Journal published a series of annual specials combining its usual critical format with extended samples of comics from specially selected contributors.

With issue No. 300 (November 2009), The Comics Journal ceased its semi-monthly print publication. TCJ shifted from an eight-times a year publishing schedule to a larger, more elaborate, semi-annual format supported by a new website. This format lasted until 2013 with issue #302. The print magazine then went on hiatus, returning to a bi-yearly format in 2019 with issue #303.

=== Lawsuits ===
Over the years The Journal has been involved in a handful of lawsuits. Artist Rich Buckler attempted legal action for a review that called him a plagiarist while printing his panels next to earlier and quite similar Jack Kirby art. A Groth interview with science fiction writer Harlan Ellison sparked a lawsuit by writer Michael Fleisher over an informal discussion of Fleisher's work and temperament. Co-defendants Groth and Ellison won the case, but emerged from the suit estranged.

Ellison later became a plaintiff against The Comics Journal, filing suit in part to enjoin The Comics Journal Library: The Writers, a 2006 Fantagraphics book that reprinted the Ellison interview, and which used a cover blurb calling Ellison a "Famous Comics Dilettante". That case was ultimately settled, with Fantagraphics agreeing to omit both the blurb and the interview from any future printings of the book, Ellison agreeing to post a Groth rebuttal statement on Ellison's webpage, and both sides agreeing to avoid future "ad hominem attacks".

The Journal has on occasion published, as cover features, lengthy court transcripts of comics-related civil suits. Notable instances include the Fleisher suit and Marv Wolfman's failed suit against Marvel Comics over ownership of the character Blade.

== Content ==
The Journal features critical essays, articles on comics history and lengthy interviews, conducted by Gary Groth and others. Noteworthy interviews include Gil Kane in No. 38, Steve Gerber in No. 41, Harlan Ellison in No. 53, Dennis O'Neil in No. 64, Robert Crumb in No. 113, and Charles M. Schulz in #200.

According to Rick Cusick, writing in Gauntlet magazine, the Journal's combination of forthright news coverage and critical analysis – although the norm for traditional journalistic enterprises – was in sharp contrast to the affectionate and promotional methods of publications like Comics Buyer's Guide and (later) Wizard. In 1995, publisher Gary Groth joked that his magazine occupied "a niche that nobody wants".

== Staff members and regular contributors ==
Gary Groth has been the Journal's publisher and nominal editor for almost all of its existence. Staff members and regular contributors have included Kim Thompson, Greg Stump, Eric Millikin, Eric Reynolds, Ng Suat Tong, R. Fiore, R.C. Harvey, Kenneth Smith, Don Phelps, Robert Boyd, Tom Heintjes, Michael Dean, Tom Spurgeon, Robert Rodi, Gene Phillips, Marilyn Bethke, Cat Yronwode, Heidi MacDonald, Lee Wochner, Bhob Stewart, Arn Saba, Ted White, Bob Levin, Carter Scholz, and Noah Berlatsky. Guest contributors have included Dave Sim and Trina Robbins.

=== Managing editors ===
- 1987–1988: Thom Powers
- 1988–1989: Greg S. Baisden
- 1989–1990: Robert Boyd
- 1990–September 1991: Helena Harvilicz
- September 1991–1993: Frank M. Young
- 1993 – September 1993: Carole Sobocinski
- September 1993 – September 1994: Scott Nybakken
- September 1994–1999: Tom Spurgeon (also executive editor 1998–1999)
- 1999–2001: Eric Evans and Darren Hick
- 2001–2002: Anne Elizabeth Moore
- 2002–2004: Milo George
- 2004–2006: Dirk Deppey
- 2006–2011: Michael Dean
- 2019–2021: RJ Casey and Kristy Valenti
- 2021: Rachel Miller and Kristy Valenti
- 2022: Kristy Valenti and Austin English

=== Online editors ===
- Kristy Valenti, 2010–2011
- Dan Nadel and Tim Hodler, 2011–2017
- Tim Hodler and Tucker Stone, 2017–2019
- Tucker Stone, 2017–2021
- Tucker Stone and Joe McCulloch, 2021–2024 (through April)
- Chris Mautner and Sally Madden, May 2024 – ongoing

== The Journal's Top 100 Comics list ==
The Journal published a 20th-century comics canon in its 210th issue (February 1999). To compile the list, eight contributors and editors made eight separate top 100 (or fewer than 100 for some) lists of American works. These eight lists were then informally combined and tweaked into an ordered list. Krazy Kat topped the list, followed by Peanuts, Pogo, and Art Spiegelman's Maus. Harvey Kurtzman had the most entries of any creator, five: his original run on Mad (#8), his "New Trend" EC war comics (#12), the 1959 Jungle Book graphic novel (#26), his Hey Look! gag cartoons (#63), and the Goodman Beaver stories (#64).

The Village Voice cited the survey's ad hoc criteria:

Putting Bernard Krigstein and Al Feldstein's eight-page story "Master Race", Hal Foster's 34 years of work on Prince Valiant, Al Hirschfeld's theatrical caricatures, all the horror comics EC published in the first half of the '50s and Robert Crumb's sketchbooks in the same category suggests that they've cast their net a bit wide.

Among the controversial omissions to the Top 100 was Dave Sim's Cerebus series. Sim and the Journal had periodically found themselves at odds in the years preceding the list's formulation. Issue #213 included eight pages of responses to, and defenses of the list; Journal columnist R. Fiore wrote "Dave Sim must now think you have a personal vendetta against him", and co-publisher Kim Thompson conceded: "If I had to do it over again, I'd squash together the Hernandez material into two entries [and] put Cerebus and two other things in the vacant spots". Twelve years later, the omission was still being acknowledged by the Journal, which noted that Dave Sim's Cerebus "was conspicuously excluded".

Regarding the inclusion of superhero comics on the list, editor and survey participant Tom Spurgeon wrote: "I voted for most of the men-in-spandex titles that made the list – Spider-Man, Fantastic Four, Plastic Man – despite the sheer lousiness of some of those works' contributing elements". Ultimately, the Top 100 included six superhero works, including the deconstructionist Watchmen. Frank Miller's The Dark Knight Returns was one well-regarded mainstream superhero project that was considered but ultimately not chosen, according to co-publisher Kim Thompson.

== Awards ==
Awards and award nominations for The Comics Journal
Year	Organisation	Award	Result
1981	Eagle Award	Favourite Fan Publication (American Division)	Won
1990	Harvey Award	Best Biographical, Historical, or Journalistic Presentation	Won
1991	Harvey Award	Best Biographical, Historical, or Journalistic Presentation	Won
1992	Harvey Award	Best Biographical, Historical, or Journalistic Presentation	Won
1993	Harvey Award	Best Biographical, Historical, or Journalistic Presentation	Won
1995	Harvey Award	Best Biographical, Historical, or Journalistic Presentation	Won
1996	Eisner Award	Best Comics-Related Periodical/Publication	Won
1997	Eisner Award	Best Comics-Related Periodical/Publication	Won
1997	Harvey Award	Best Biographical, Historical, or Journalistic Presentation	Won
1998	Eisner Award	Best Comics-Related Periodical/Publication	Won
1998	Harvey Award	Best Biographical, Historical, or Journalistic Presentation	Won
1999	Eisner Award	Best Comics-Related Periodical/Publication	Won
1999	Harvey Award	Best Biographical, Historical, or Journalistic Presentation	Won
2000	Harvey Award	Best Biographical, Historical, or Journalistic Presentation	Won
2001	Harvey Award	Best Biographical, Historical, or Journalistic Presentation	Won
2003	Harvey Award	Best Anthology; Comics Journal Summer Special 2002	Won
2004	Eagle Award	Favourite Magazine About Comics	Won
2005	Eagle Award	Favourite Magazine About Comics	Won
2006	Harvey Award	Best Biographical, Historical, or Journalistic Presentation	Won
2009	Eisner Award	Best Comics-Related Periodical/Journalism	Nominated
2018	Eisner Award	Best Comics-Related Periodical/Journalism	Won

== See also ==
- Comic Art
- List of Comics Journal interview subjects—Provides issue numbers with interview subjects
- Sequart Organization
