= Wash (visual arts) =

Background in an artwork of a dilute colour

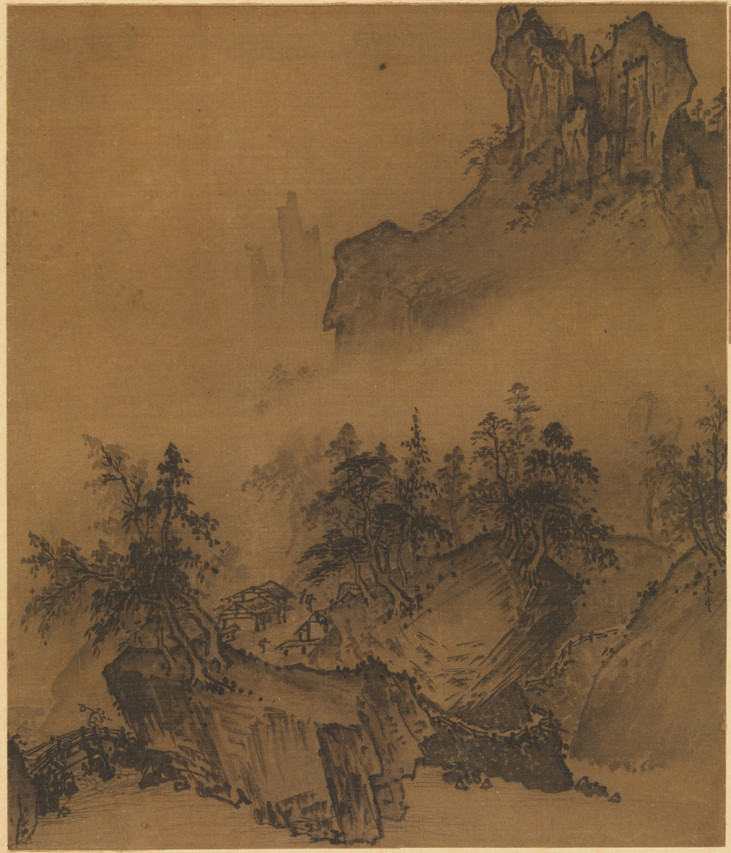
Xia Gui (Song dynasty) – Mountain Market- Clear with Rising Mist, one of the 8 scenes of the Eight Views of Xiaoxiang, a favourite subject in the Chinese ink wash painting tradition, showing the variety of effects achievable with black ink.

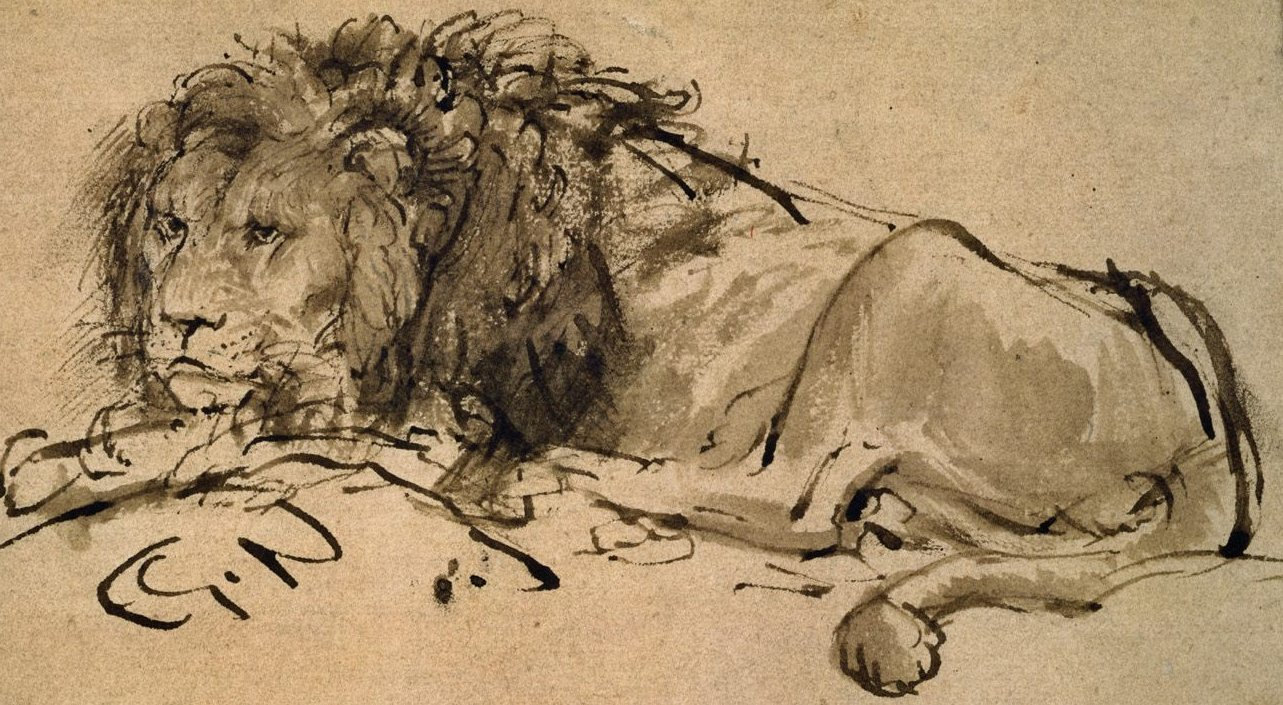
Rembrandt selectively used a wash technique in his depictions of lions to enhance the contrast between "the heavy manes and supple skin".

A wash is a term for a visual arts technique resulting in a semi-transparent layer of colour. A wash of diluted ink or watercolor paint applied in combination with drawing is called pen and wash, wash drawing, or ink and wash. Normally only one or two colours of wash are used; if more colours are used the result is likely to be classified as a full watercolor painting.

The classic East Asian tradition of ink wash painting uses black ink in various levels of dilution. Historically associated with the four arts of the scholar-officials, the technique was often applied to landscapes in traditional Chinese, Japanese, and Korean painting.

== Technique ==
In painting, it is a technique in which a paint brush that is very wet with solvent and holds a small load of paint or ink is applied to a wet or dry support such as paper or primed or raw canvas. The result is a smooth and uniform area that ideally lacks the appearance of brush strokes and is semi-transparent.

A wash is accomplished by using a large amount of solvent with little paint. Paint consists of a pigment and binder which allows the pigment to adhere to its support. Solvents dilute the binder, thus diluting the binding strength of the paint. Washes can be brittle and fragile paint films because of this. However, when gum arabic watercolor washes are applied to a highly absorbent surface, such as paper, the effects are long lasting.

The wash technique can be achieved by doing the following:

- With water-based media such as inks, acrylic paints, tempera paints or watercolor paints, a wet brush should be dipped into a pool of very wet and diluted paint. This paint pool should be evenly mixed and dispersed to prevent uneven pigment load on the brush. The loaded brush should then be applied to a dry or wet support. Washes are most often applied with large brushes over large areas. The areas in which a wash effects can be controlled with careful application of the wash, and with the use of liquid frisket or rubber cement.
- With oil-based media such as oil paint, a similar technique as outlined above may be used, though instead of water the paint pool should be well diluted in solvent, such as turpentine or mineral spirits. The loaded brush should be applied to a dry or solvent soaked support. Because oil paint has a longer drying time than water-based media, brushing over or blending a wash can extend or even out the appearance of the wash. American artists Jackson Pollock, Mark Rothko, Morris Louis, Sam Francis, Paul Jenkins, Helen Frankenthaler, Jules Olitski, Friedel Dzubas, Ronnie Landfield and several others are famous for creating washy, watercolor-like effects in oil and acrylic paintings in distinctive and radical styles and versions of this method, and which is sometimes called stain painting.

== Other media ==
In interior design, a wash or color wash of paint on a wall can be used to create a textured effect as a faux finish.

In ceramics, a wash is typically a coloring oxide thinned with water applied to the piece to achieve an effect similar to a glaze.

Digital image creation software can have features that simulate the painting technique.

Within cinematic representation of the technique, Alfred Hitchcock used a wash of red over closeup of actress Tippi Hedren in Marnie as an expressionistic representation of the character's emotional trauma.

== See also ==
- Bistre
- Color field painting
- Lime or white wash
