= Blechman =

Blechman is a surname. Notable people with the surname include:

- Jonah Blechman (born 1975), American actor
- Nicholas Blechman, American illustrator and graphic designer
- R. O. Blechman (born 1930), American illustrator and author
- Ziva Rodann (born Ziva Blechman in 1933), Israeli-born American actress
