= Harvey Kurtzman =

American cartoonist (1924–1993)

- Author photo from Help! #7 (1961)
- Born: October 3, 1924 Brooklyn, New York, U.S.
- Died: February 21, 1993 (aged 68) Mount Vernon, New York, U.S.
- Areas: Cartoonist, Writer, Artist, Editor
- Notable works: Mad; Little Annie Fanny
- Spouse: Adele

Harvey Kurtzman (/ˈkɜːrtsmən/; October 3, 1924 – February 21, 1993) was an American cartoonist and editor. His best-known work includes writing and editing the parodic comic book Mad from 1952 until 1956, and writing the Little Annie Fanny strips in Playboy from 1962 until 1988. His work is noted for its satire and parody of popular culture, social critique, and attention to detail. Kurtzman's working method has been likened to that of an auteur, and he expected those who illustrated his stories to follow his layouts strictly.

Kurtzman began to work on the New Trend line of comic books at EC Comics in 1950. He wrote and edited the Two-Fisted Tales and Frontline Combat war comic books, where he also drew many of the carefully researched stories, before he created his most-remembered comic book, Mad, in 1952. Kurtzman scripted the stories and had them drawn by top EC cartoonists, most frequently Will Elder, Wally Wood, and Jack Davis; the early Mad was noted for its social critique and parodies of pop culture. The comic book switched to a magazine format in 1955, and Kurtzman left it in 1956 over a dispute with EC's owner William Gaines over financial control. Following his departure, he did a variety of cartooning work, including editing the short-lived Trump and the self-published Humbug. In 1959, he produced the first book-length work of original comics, the adult-oriented, satirical Jungle Book. He edited the low-budget Help! from 1960 to 1965, a humor magazine which featured work by future Monty Python member and film director Terry Gilliam and the earliest work of underground cartoonists such as Robert Crumb and Gilbert Shelton. He brought Help! to an end after the success of the risqué Playboy feature Little Annie Fanny began to take up his time. While Annie Fanny provided much of his income for the rest of his career, he continued to produce an eclectic body of work, including screenwriting the animated Mad Monster Party? in 1967 and directing, writing and designing several shorts for Sesame Street in 1969.

From 1973, Kurtzman taught cartooning at the School of Visual Arts in New York. His work gained greater recognition toward the end of his life, and he oversaw deluxe reprintings of much of his work. The Harvey Award was named in Kurtzman's honor in 1988. He was inducted into the Will Eisner Comic Book Hall of Fame in 1989, and his work earned five positions on The Comics Journal's Top 100 Comics of the 20th Century.

== Personal and professional history ==
=== Early life (1924–1942) ===
Harvey Kurtzman spoke little of his parents in interviews, and not much is known of their pre-American lives. David Kurtzman and Edith née Sherman grew up in Ukraine in Odesa, and were literate urbanites. They belonged to the city's large Jewish community, one that suffered generations of antisemitic oppression, and the city had fallen into economic hardship following the Russian Revolution. Shortly after World War I David emigrated to New York and Edith soon followed in what she called "a desperate journey" escaping the new Soviet Union. There the non-observant pair married in a civil ceremony. The first of their two sons, Zachary, was born April 8, 1923.

Harvey Kurtzman was born on October 3, 1924, in a tenement building on 428 East Ninety-Eighth Street in Brooklyn in New York City. David joined the Christian Science church, and when he suffered a bleeding ulcer he turned to prayer to cure it; he died from it on November 29, 1928, at age 36. The family was in such desperate financial straits that their mother placed the Kurtzman brothers in an orphanage for three months until she secured work as a milliner. Several months later, Edith remarried to Russian-Jewish immigrant Abraham Perkes, who worked in the printing industry as a brass engraver. The Kurtzman boys kept their surname, while their mother took that of Perkes. The couple had a son Daniel on February 17, 1931. In 1934, the family moved to the more upscale Bronx, where the family lived at 2166 Clinton Avenue.

Perkes was not wealthy, but managed to provide for his family during the Great Depression of the 1930s. He was a trade unionist, and the couple read the communist newspaper Daily Worker. Perkes brought young Kurtzman to work, and encouraged him to help with design and drawing and to think of himself as a professional artist.

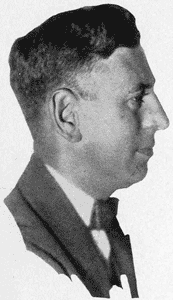
Young Kurtzman imitated the work of Rube Goldberg.

Though he was a shy boy his teachers recognized Kurtzman's intelligence in grade school and allowed him to skip a grade. He displayed artistic talent early and his sidewalk chalk drawings drew the attention of children and adults, who gathered around to watch him draw. He called these strips "Ikey and Mikey", inspired by Goldberg's comic strip Mike and Ike. His stepfather also had an interest in art and took the boys to museums. His mother encouraged his artistic development and enrolled him in art lessons; on Saturdays, he took the subway to Manhattan for formal art instruction. His parents had him attend the left-leaning Jewish Camp Kinderland, but he did not enjoy its dogmatic atmosphere. Though not ashamed of their Jewish heritage, neither of the Kurtzman brothers agreed to have a Bar Mitzvah.

Kurtzman fell in love with comic strips and the newly emerging comic books in the late 1930s. Unsatisfied with what he found in his parents' newspapers, he searched through garbage cans for the Sunday comics sections of his neighbors' newspapers. He admired a wide variety of strips, including Hamlin's Alley Oop, Caniff's Terry and the Pirates, Gould's Dick Tracy, Foster's Prince Valiant, Raymond's Flash Gordon, and Capp's Li'l Abner. He found Will Eisner's comic book The Spirit a "standard by which other comic books would be measured", and called Eisner "the greatest ... a virtuoso cartoonist of a kind who had never been seen before". Eisner's page layouts had considerable influence on Kurtzman's work.

At 14 Kurtzman won a cartooning contest for which he received a dollar and had his cartoon published in Tip Top Comics #36 (April 1939). Future collaborator Jack Davis had won the same contest a few issues earlier. After winning the annual John Wanamaker Art Contest, Kurtzman received a scholarship to attend high school at The High School of Music & Art. Future colleagues Will Elder, Al Feldstein, Al Jaffee, John Severin, and Charles Stern also attended the school. His ambitions were apparent even then; at a 2016 New York Comic Con panel, Jaffee recounted how a 15-year-old Kurtzman told his fellow students Jaffee and Elder "Someday I'm going to have a magazine, and I'm going to hire you guys." Kurtzman graduated at 16 in 1941 and went on to Cooper Union on a scholarship. Kurtzman left after a year to focus on making comic books.

=== Early career (1942–1949) ===
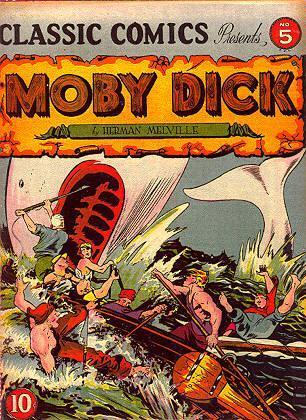
Kurtzman assisted on the Classics Illustrated version of Moby Dick in 1942 as his first assignment at Louis Ferstadt's studio.

Kurtzman met Alfred Andriola in 1942, encouraged by a quote in Martin Sheridan's Classic Comics and their Creators where Andriola offered help to aspiring cartoonists. Kurtzman made an appointment, but Andriola's response to his work was discouraging—he told Kurtzman to give up on cartooning. Kurtzman called this meeting "one of the worst days of [his] life", though he ignored Andriola's advice and continued to peddle his portfolio.

Kurtzman continued to do odd jobs in 1942 until he got his first break in the comics industry at Louis Ferstadt's studio, which produced comics for Quality, Ace, Gilberton, and the Daily Worker. His first published work there was assisting on issue #5 (September 1942) (Note: The artwork for the issue was penciled by Louis Zansky and inked by Fred Eng.) of Gilberton's Classic Comics, which features an adaptation of Moby Dick. His first pencil job appeared in Four Favorites #8 (December 1942). (Note: Credited to "Kurtzman with Looey", suggesting Ferstadt handled the inking.) He produced a large amount of undistinguished work in 1942 and 1943, which he later called "very crude, very ugly stuff", before he was drafted in 1943 for service in World War II.

Kurtzman trained for the infantry, but was never sent overseas. He was stationed in Louisiana, North Carolina, South Carolina, and Texas. He illustrated instruction manuals, posters, and flyers, and contributed cartoons to camp newspapers, and newsletters. While on furlough, he was invited by editor and cartoonist L. B. Cole to draw the "Black Venus" superheroine, packaged for publisher Rae Herman's Orbit Publications. Kurtzman did two Black Venus stories, his first comics work all in brushwork, which were published in Contact Comics in 1945 and 1946. In 1944 he also did freelance work for several local publications while stationed in North Carolina, and had several gag cartoons in Yank by the end of October 1945. The quantity of work allowed Kurtzman to hone his style, which became more refined and distinct.

After his discharge following the war, Kurtzman found competition fierce in the comics industry, as freelancing replaced the system of packaging shops. He applied to the newspaper PM, but his portfolio was rejected by cartoon editor Walt Kelly. After a series of short-lived assignments and partnerships, Kurtzman got together with former Music and Art alumni Will Elder and Charles Stern. They opened Charles William Harvey Studio in 1947, but had difficulty getting work. The three had little business sense. Kurtzman managed the bills. In their Broadway studio, which Kurtzman kept open until the end of 1951, they sublet space to cartoonists such as John Severin, Dave Berg, and René Goscinny.

Kurtzman had been doing crossword puzzles for publisher Martin Goodman since early in his career. A distant relative of Goodman's, Stan Lee, worked as an editor for Goodman's Timely Comics (a precursor to Marvel Comics). He offered Kurtzman work doing one-page fillers, work that paid little. Lee named the strip Hey Look!, and Kurtzman produced 150 episodes of it from 1946 until 1949.

At a Music and Art reunion in early 1946 Kurtzman met Adele Hasan, who was one of the staff members at Timely and was dating Will Elder. She fell for Kurtzman, confiding to Al Jaffee that he "was the kind of kind [she would] like to marry". Later in the year, Timely ran a "Now You Can Be the Editor!" contest whose ballots Hasan was assigned to sort through. She was disappointed that readers did not enjoy Kurtzman's Hey Look! as much as she did. She "stuffed the ballot box" in Kurtzman's favor, which prompted an astonished Stan Lee to assign Kurtzman more work. Kurtzman was given the talking animal feature Pigtales at regular freelance rates, as well as miscellaneous other assignments. As Harvey stopped by the Timely offices more frequently, he and Adele would flirt, and eventually started dating. She left Timely for college that autumn, and corresponded frequently with Kurtzman; soon she dropped out of college and the two married that September.

In 1948 Kurtzman produced a Sunday comic strip, Silver Linings, which ran infrequently in the New York Herald Tribune between March and June. Lee had Hey Look! brought to an end in 1949 so Kurtzman could concentrate on longer features for Timely's family-oriented line. Kurtzman was assigned artwork duties for the Lee-scripted Rusty, an imitation of Chic Young's comic strip Blondie, but was disappointed with this type of work and began looking for other employment. He sold episodes of the one-pagers Egghead Doodle and Genius to Timely and Al Capp's Toby Press on a freelance basis. He also sold longer pieces to Toby, including episodes of his Western parody Pot Shot Pete, a short-lived series that hinted at the pop-culture satire Kurtzman was to become known for.

Kurtzman came across Charles Biro's Crime Does Not Pay, a comic book Kurtzman describes as reading with "the same excitement ... that [he] felt about the underground comic books of twenty years later". These stories presented a view of reality quite different from the escapist entertainment typical of comics of the day, and was to influence the war and social drama work Kurtzman was soon to do at EC Comics.

=== EC and Mad (1949–1956) ===
Kurtzman continued to shop his work around, and produced work for Ace/Periodical, Quality, Aviation Press, Timely, and the magazines Varsity and Parents. He did a number of children's books, four of which were collaborations with René Goscinny. He brought some samples of educational comics into the EC Comics offices—"EC" had originally stood for "Educational Comics" when it was run by Max Gaines, but his son Bill changed the company's focus and name to "Entertaining Comics" when he inherited the business. Gaines liked Kurtzman's Hey Look! samples but had no immediate use for his particular skills. Gaines directed Kurtzman to his brother, David, who gave him some low-paying work on Lucky Fights it Through, a two-fisted cowboy story with an educational health message about syphilis.

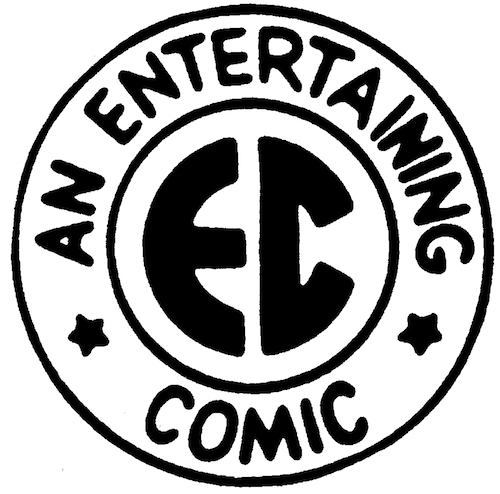
Kurtzman worked for EC Comics from 1950 to 1956.

With the doors to EC open to him Kurtzman started getting regular work from the publisher in 1950. That spring, EC's "New Trend" line of horror, fantasy, and science fiction comics began, and Kurtzman contributed stories in these genres. His income doubled over the previous year's. In late 1950, he began writing and editing an adventure title, Two-Fisted Tales, which he proposed as a comic book in the vein of Roy Crane's popular comic strip, Captain Easy. The comic book differed in offering realistic stories in place of Crane's idealism, a degree of realism not yet seen in American comics. The war stories of Frontline Combat followed in mid-1951. The stories were not only about modern war, but also derived from deep in history, such as the Roman legions and Napoleonic campaigns. Kurtzman rejected the idealization of war that had swept the US since World War II. He spent hours in the New York Public Library in search of the detailed truth behind the stories he was writing, sometimes taking days or weeks to research a story. His research included interviewing and corresponding with GIs taking a ride aboard a rescue plane, and sending his assistant Jerry DeFuccio for a ride in a submarine to gather sound effects. (DeFuccio's first field report from this assignment was a 10-word telegram to Kurtzman reading "MANY BRAVE HEARTS ARE ASLEEP IN THE DEEP GLUB GLUB.") The stories gave a sympathetic look to both sides of a conflict, regardless of nationality or ethnicity. He sought to tell what he saw as the objective truth about war, deglamorizing it and showing its futility, though the stories were not explicitly anti-war.

Kurtzman was given a great deal of artistic freedom by Gaines, but was himself a strict taskmaster. He insisted that the artists who drew his stories not deviate from his layouts. The artists generally respected Kurtzman's wishes out of respect for his creative authority, but some, like Bernie Krigstein and Dan Barry, felt their own artistic autonomy impinged upon.

Kurtzman is best known for creating Mad in 1952.

Those who worked for EC received payment based on output. Kurtzman's laborious working methods meant he was less prolific than fellow EC writer and editor Al Feldstein, and Kurtzman felt financially underappreciated for the amount of effort he poured into his work. He was financially burdened with a mortgage and a family. He also detested the horror content of the books Feldstein was producing, and which consistently outsold his own work. He believed these stories had the same sort of influence on children that the chauvinism of war comics which he believed he worked hard against in his own work. Remembering Kurtzman's humor work from the 1940s, Gaines proposed a humor magazine to increase Kurtzman's income, as he believed it would take far less time and effort to research. Mad debuted in August 1952, (Note: The October–November cover-dated first issue of Mad appeared on newsstands in August 1952.) and Kurtzman scripted every story in the first twenty-three issues. The stories in Mad targeted what Kurtzman saw as fundamental untruths in the subjects parodied, inspired by the irreverent humor found in college humor magazines. They were developed in the same incremental way Kurtzman had developed for the war stories, and his layouts were followed faithfully by the artists who drew them—most frequently, Will Elder, Jack Davis and Wally Wood.

Mad did not have instant success, but found its audience by the fourth issue, which quickly sold out. The issue featured the Wood-drawn "Superduperman", a parody of Superman and Captain Marvel, including the copyright infringement lawsuit that National Periodicals (now DC Comics) had recently brought against Fawcett Comics. National, the owners of Superman's copyright, threatened to file another lawsuit over the parody. EC and National shared the same lawyer, who advised Gaines to quit publishing parodies. While Gaines was weighing this advice, Kurtzman discovered a legal precedent that backed Mad's right to parody. Gaines hired the author of that precedent to write a brief substantiating EC's position, but the lawyer sided with National. Gaines consulted a third lawyer, who advised Gaines to ignore the threat and continue publishing parodies. National never filed suit. When Kurtzman parodied National's Batman character just four issues later, the spoof included six separate picket signs, posters and other notices proclaiming that "Batboy and Rubin" was a comedic imitation, e.g.: "Not a spittoon, not a cartoon, not a harpoon, but a LAMPOON!"

Parodying specific targets became a staple of Mad. Beginning April 1954, the bimonthly Mad went monthly after the cancelation of Frontline Combat, whose sales had flagged when the Korean War ended. Soon, large numbers of Mad imitators sprang up from other publishers, as well as from EC itself with the Feldstein-edited Panic. Kurtzman poured himself into Mad, putting as much effort into it as he had into his war books. This defeated the purpose of having an easy-to-produce third book, but with Frontline Combat's cancelation, Kurtzman focused on Mad.

During the early 1950s, Kurtzman became one of the writers for Dan Barry's relaunched Flash Gordon daily comic strip. He scripted two sequences for the strip, with portions pencilled by Frank Frazetta. The strip soon became one of Mad's targets in "Flesh Garden!", drawn by Wood, who had earlier assisted Barry on the Flash Gordon strip. In 1954, Kurtzman dreamed up a full-color, 100-page adaptation of Dickens' A Christmas Carol called Marley's Ghost, and proposed the project to Simon & Schuster and other publishers. The proposal included seven finished pages, as well as a page redone by Jack Davis in case publishers' rejections were due to Kurtzman's drawing style. The ambitious project did not find a willing publisher, as comics were still seen as too low-brow for such lavish treatment.

Since the 1940s, crime and horror comics had been drawing fire from those worried about a rise in juvenile delinquency. The Senate Subcommittee on Juvenile Delinquency brought pressure on such comic books in 1954, and EC, one of the major purveyors of such fare, found their wares being refused by their distributor. Gaines brought those titles to an end and tried to replace them with the New Direction line, but by autumn 1955 the only remaining EC title was Mad. Gaines had just allowed Kurtzman to change Mad's format to a magazine in July, in order to keep him at EC after Kurtzman had received an offer of employment from Pageant magazine.

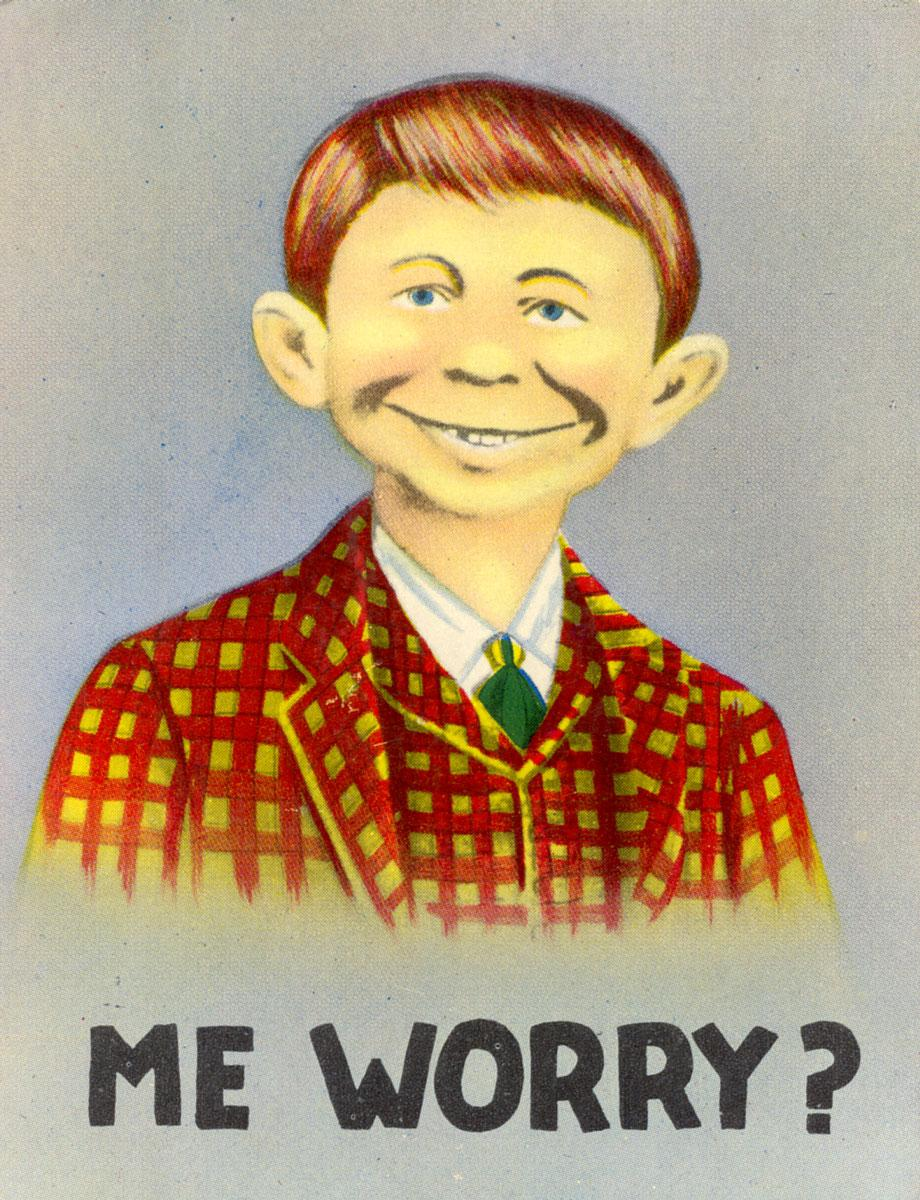
Kurtzman appropriated the "Me Worry?" character as Mad's mascot, Alfred E. Neuman.

Kurtzman had long dreamed of joining the slick magazine publishing world, and had been trying to convince Gaines to publish Mad in a larger, more adult format. The August issue of Pageant featured an article "Now Comics Have Gone Mad", and Pageant's publisher Alex Hillman offered Kurtzman a job. With the prospect of losing his lone editor and writer, Gaines gave in to Kurtzman's demands. The magazine-format twenty-fourth issue of Mad (July 1955) was more successful than anticipated, and had to be reprinted, an unusual occurrence in magazine publishing. The new presentation was ambitious, and included meticulously rendered advertisement parodies and text pieces by humorists such as Ernie Kovacs, Stan Freberg, and Steve Allen. It was around this time that Kurtzman introduced Mad's gap-toothed mascot and his slogan, "What, me worry?", whom Feldstein later named Alfred E. Neuman.

Elsewhere, the one-time cartoonist Hugh Hefner had become a media mogul by the mid-1950s with his Playboy magazine. He had admired Kurtzman's Mad, and met Kurtzman in New York to express his appreciation. He told Kurtzman that if he were ever to leave Mad, a place would be waiting for him in the Hefner empire. With this promise to back him, Kurtzman demanded legal control of Mad from Gaines in the form of stocks. Reluctant to lose the editor of his sole remaining publication, Gaines offered a 10% share. As this would not give Kurtzman the control he wanted, Kurtzman countered with a demand for 51%. Gaines refused, and the two parted ways. Kurtzman contacted Hefner and Gaines hired Al Feldstein to edit Mad.

=== Trump, Humbug and Jungle Book (1957–1959) ===
... we all somehow talked ourselves into a very foolish thing, which was an artists' magazine ... All of us chipped in money, and we went into the publishing business, which artists should never, never do, for the simple reason that they lose sight of the practical considerations of business survival. Art becomes everything and the marketplace becomes secondary.

— Kurtzman, in interview

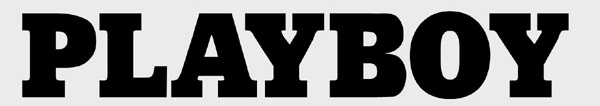
With Trump (1957), Kurtzman began a long relation with Hugh Hefner and Playboy.

Hefner employed Kurtzman from April 1956. The slick, full-color Trump appeared on newsstands in January 1957. Cartoonists who contributed to Trump included Mad regulars such as Elder, Wood, Davis, and Jaffee, as well as Russ Heath and newer artists such as Irving Geis, Arnold Roth, and R. O. Blechman. Writers Mel Brooks, Roger Price, Doodles Weaver, and Max Shulman also made contributions. The fifty-cent magazine was a luxurious, more risqué version of Mad, and sold well. Unfortunately, Hefner began to have financial problems, and canceled Trump after its second issue. The magazine had been a success in the market, but had already accrued $100,000 in expenses, about which Hefner quipped, "I gave Harvey Kurtzman an unlimited budget, and he exceeded it."

Hefner delivered the news in person to Kurtzman—in the hospital where his third child, Elizabeth, was being born. Adele said it was the only time she had seen her husband cry. Kurtzman later said that Trump was the closest he ever came to producing "the perfect humor magazine".

While the Trump artists were mulling over the situation in the Playboy offices, Roth approached with a bottle of scotch. By the time they left the office, the group had agreed to embark on a publishing venture of their own: Humbug. The publication was financed and run by the artists who created it, though none of the group had business experience. Only artist Jack Davis became an equal shareholder and the only salaried employee despite declining to financially back the project; his participation was considered vital to its success. The others would joke in years to come that Davis was the only one to make any money from Humbug.

With Kurtzman in the lead the reinvigorated, close-knit group set out to produce a classy publication in the vein of college humor magazines, but aimed at a general readership. Along with the pop-cultural satire that had been the staple of Mad and Trump, Humbug included more topical and political satire, mostly from writers other than Kurtzman. Hefner provided the group desirable office space at an inexpensive rate, out of guilt for canceling Trump so quickly.

Humbug ran into snags right away due to its small format, which made it difficult for consumers to find it on the newsstands. It also suffered distribution problems. For its last two issues, Humbug was printed in a standard magazine size, and the price was raised from fifteen cents to twenty-five. At the last minute, the page count of the eleventh issue was increased from thirty-two pages to forty-eight, reprinting material from Trump. This last issue included a self-deprecating message from Kurtzman which summarized the artists' careers and announced Humbug's farewell. The group followed divergent career paths following the breakup.

After the demise of Humbug, Kurtzman spent a few years as a freelance contributor to magazines such as Playboy, Esquire, Madison Avenue, The Saturday Evening Post, TV Guide, and Pageant. With Elliot Caplin he produced a poorly received comic strip, Kermit the Hermit, among other miscellaneous work. In 1958 Kurtzman proposed a strip to TV Guide parodying adult Western TV shows; its rejection particularly disappointed him.

In 1959, Ballantine Books was looking for something to replace its successful line of Mad mass-market paperback reprints after Gaines had taken it to another publisher. Ballantine had earlier published The Humbug Digest in the same format, though it fared poorly in the market. Kurtzman proposed a book of original material designed for the format, which Ian Ballantine, with reservations, accepted on faith out of respect for Kurtzman. Harvey Kurtzman's Jungle Book was the first mass-market paperback of original comics content in the United States, and to Kurtzman biographer Denis Kitchen was a precursor to the graphic novel. Whereas his Mad stories had been aimed at an adolescent audience, Kurtzman made Jungle Book for adults, which was unusual in American comics. Jungle Book sold poorly, but remained a favorite among its small number of devoted fans. If it had been a success, Kurtzman intended to continue with more books in the same vein.

=== Help! and Little Annie Fanny (1960–1965) ===
Kurtzman had "The Grasshopper and the Ant" printed in Esquire magazine in 1960. The strip was a social allegory of a hipster grasshopper and a hard-working ant with opposing worldviews, both of whom lose out in the end. It was a rarity for Kurtzman in that he created it in full color, rather in black-and-white lineart with color added afterward. Kurtzman once more proposed Marley's Ghost to a number of publishers in 1962, including The Saturday Evening Post, but again it was rejected.

In 1960, Harvey teamed up with publisher James Warren to co-publish Help!. Warren Publishing ran the business end, while co-ownership of the magazine allowed Kurtzman the control that he wanted, though its tight budget restricted that control. The magazine made frequent use of fumetti photographic comics, which sometimes starred celebrities such as Woody Allen and a pre-Monty Python John Cleese. The first issue was cover-dated August 1960. Gloria Steinem and Terry Gilliam were among those the magazine employed. By the end of its run, Help! had introduced a number of young cartoonists who were to play a major part in the underground comix movement, including Robert Crumb, Jay Lynch, Gilbert Shelton, Spain Rodriguez, and Skip Williamson.

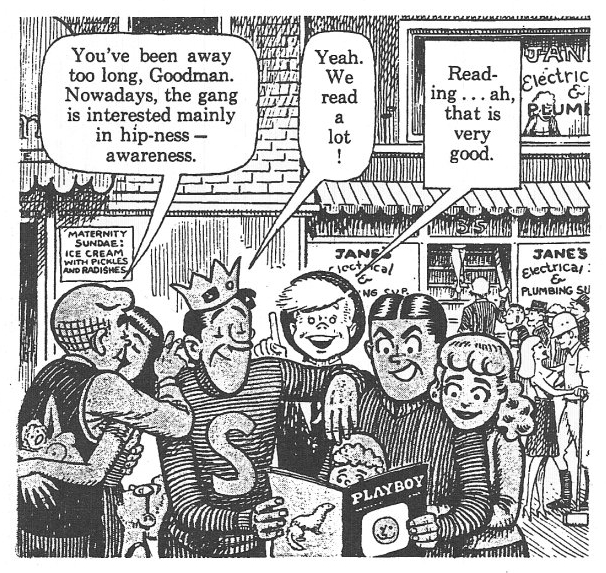
The parodic depictions of Archie Comics characters in "Goodman Goes Playboy" prompted a copyright infringement lawsuit.

Help!'s most famous story starred Kurtzman's character Goodman Beaver in "Goodman Goes Playboy" in the February 1962 issue. (Note: The February 1962 issue of Help! appeared in late 1961.) The story satirized Hefner and his lifestyle, while parodying Archie comics in a much more risqué way than the previous "Starchie" parody in Mad had. The Archie characters were drinking, partying skirt-chasers home from college. Archie's publishers sued, and Warren agreed to settle out of court rather than risk an expensive lawsuit. The actual target of the strip had however been Hefner, who loved it; Kurtzman began working for Hefner again soon after.

Kurtzman approached Hefner in 1960 with the idea of a comic strip feature for Playboy that would star Goodman Beaver. Playboy ran a lot of cartoons, but a comic strip was something new to the magazine. After discussing ideas, Kurtzman's proposal was accepted under the condition that Goodman Beaver be transformed into a voluptuous female. Little Annie Fanny was Playboy's first comic strip and the first multi-page comics feature in an American slick magazine. As his primary collaborator, Kurtzman had Will Elder provide the strip's labor-intensive, fully painted full-color final rendering. Little Annie Fanny began appearing in Playboy in 1962.

Kurtzman and Warren disagreed on Kurtzman's editorial decisions on Help!, and Kurtzman found himself unsatisfied with the partnership. Help!'s sales were declining, and the magazine quietly came to an end with its twenty-sixth issue, cover-dated September 1965. This allowed Kurtzman and Elder to focus full-time on Little Annie Fanny. Hefner was a demanding editor and delivered critiques to Kurtzman that could reach twenty pages.

=== Later years (1965–1993) ===
Kurtzman participated in a number of film projects beginning in the late 1960s. He co-scripted the stop-motion animated film Mad Monster Party? (1967), a job he got through the recommendation of Jack Davis, who had been doing character designs for the film's production company Rankin/Bass. Kurtzman wrote, co-directed, and designed several short animated pieces for Sesame Street in 1969; he was particularly proud of the Phil Kimmelman-animated Boat, in which a left prosthetic-legged sea captain voiced by Hal Smith orders a series of increasingly larger numerals to load into a boat, eventually sinking it. In 1972, he appeared in a television advertisement for Scripto pens.

Kurtzman turned down a number of well-paying opportunities in the 1970s. In early 1972, Stan Lee offered Kurtzman a senior position at Marvel Comics, and proposed another Mad-like magazine; Kurtzman turned these opportunities down, as he felt unprepared to return to the comic book industry after being out of it for so long since leaving EC. Marvel launched Crazy Magazine without him in 1973. Michael C. Gross asked him to contribute to National Lampoon around this time. The magazine's staff revered Kurtzman and had published a parody of Mad in 1971 that included "Citizen Gaines", a piece critical of Gaines' handling of Mad and treatment of Kurtzman. Kurtzman turned the offer down, as he felt out of step with the younger cartoonists' approach. He turned down an offer from René Goscinny in 1973 to act as the US agent for the French comics magazine Pilote.

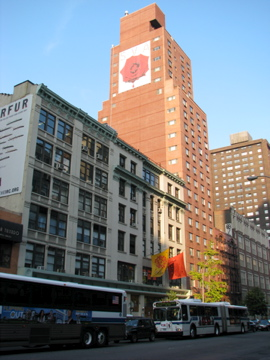
Kurtzman taught at the School of Visual Arts in the 1970s.

In 1973, New York's School of Visual Arts asked Kurtzman and Will Eisner to take teaching positions there in cartooning. Kurtzman had no earlier teaching experience and found the prospect daunting, but Eisner convinced him to take the job. Eisner's class was called "Sequential Art" and Kurtzman's was "Satirical Cartooning", which focused on single-panel gag cartooning. Kurtzman had a soft touch with his students, and was well respected and well liked. He frequently had professional cartoonists appear as guest lecturers. When the school refused to publish his students' work, Kurtzman had them published in an ad-supported, student-produced anthology that came to be called Kar-Tünz. (Note: The first edition of Kar-Tünz was titled Harvey Kurtzman's class of 73–74, School of Visual Arts.) Kar-Tünz ran for fifteen years.

Beginning in the late 1970s, Kurtzman's stature began to grow. His protégés such as Crumb, Spiegelman and Gilliam sang his praises, his reputation grew with the spread of comics fandom, and collector Glenn Bray published The Illustrated Harvey Kurtzman Index in 1976. He also found he had a following in Europe; his work appeared there for the first time in the French magazine Charlie Mensuel in October 1970, and in 1973 the European Academy of Comic Book Art awarded him its Lifetime Achievement Award for 1972. A series of reprint projects and one-shot efforts appeared in the 1970s and 1980s, including Kurtzman Komix, published in 1976 by Kitchen Sink Press. In his later years, Kurtzman continued to work on anthologies and various other projects, including editing two volumes of a YA original anthology series, Nuts, packaged by Byron Preiss and published by Bantam Books in 1985. He oversaw reprints of his work in deluxe editions from Russ Cochran, who did The Complete EC Library, and Kitchen Sink Press, who did collections of Goodman Beaver (1984), Hey Look! (1992), and others, and reprinted Harvey Kurtzman's Jungle Book (1988). Lengthy interviews were conducted with The Comics Journal and Squa Tront. The comics industry's Harvey Award was named in his honor in 1988. Kurtzman toured and gave speeches frequently to fans in the 1980s.

Kurtzman had reconciled with Gaines by the mid-1980s, and in collaboration with Elder, illustrated 19 pieces and covers for Mad from 1986 to 1989. Kurtzman brought Little Annie Fanny to an end in 1988, amid failing health, a poor relationship with Playboy cartoon editor Michelle Urry, and resentment over the discovery that he did not own the rights to the strip. Harvey Kurtzman's Strange Adventures assembled a wide cast of cartoonists in 1990 to illustrate stories from Kurtzman's layouts, though the book was not a success, nor was a revival of Two-Fisted Tales. He had long planned to write a comics history, but other work had taken priority. Towards the end of his life, he agreed to collaborate with comics historian Michael Barrier to complete From Aargh! to Zap! Harvey Kurtzman's Visual History of the Comics, which was published in 1991, though it was shorter than the more complete history Kurtzman had planned.

Kurtzman, who had suffered from Parkinson's disease and colon cancer in later life, died at Mount Vernon, New York on February 21, 1993, of complications from liver cancer, nine months after Bill Gaines' death. The New Yorker commissioned a commemorative cartoon by Will Elder and ran an elegy by writer Adam Gopnik. Cartoonist Jules Feiffer remarked at the time that cartooning had lost its Orson Welles.

== Personal life ==
Kurtzman stood 5 feet 6 inches (168 cm) and was of slight build. He had an unassuming demeanor; humorist Roger Price likened him to "a beagle who is too polite to mention that someone is standing on his tail". Rolf Malcolm described him as someone who smiles little and speaks slowly. Al Jaffee said he "was not an easy person to get too close to".

Kurtzman and wife Adele (née Hasan) were married in September 1948. They had three daughters and one son: Meredith, born July 28, 1950; Peter, born June 29, 1954; Elizabeth, born January 21, 1957; and Cornelia "Nellie", born April 15, 1969. (Meredith in 1970 went on to become one of the contributors to It Ain't Me, Babe, the first comic book produced entirely by women.)

Kurtzman's work allowed him to be at home with his children during the day, and he gave them much of his attention. As Peter had low-functioning autism, the Kurtzmans volunteered locally for work with special needs children, and in 1986 began an annual charity auction, raising money by selling the artwork of cartoonists for the Association for Mentally Ill Children of Westchester, which Adele continued to oversee following her husband's death.

== Style and working method ==
Though it may look deceptively simple to the casual observer, [Kurtzman's art] is the end product of a long process of paring an elaborate drawing down to its essential line. Nature is not straight. In Kurtzman's art even the horizon is curved.

— Comics historian Jacques Dutrey

According to Kurtzman, "Cartooning consists of the two elements, graphics and texts [sic] ... Obviously it is to the advantage of the total product to have good text and good art and the more closely integrated the good text and good art are, the greater the opportunity is to create the capital-A Art." The stories he created and had others illustrate balance captions and dialogue, in contrast with, for example, Al Feldstein's EC stories, in which the artists had to compensate for the text which dominated the page.

In the war stories he drew himself he employed a drawing style that distorted figures in expressive ways more akin to modern art than the stylizations of contemporary superhero or talking animal comics. R. C. Harvey described this style as "abstract and telepathic" in stories that were realistic in the telling, but in which "his figures were exaggerated and contorted, demonstrations of posture as drama rather than reality as perceived". French comics historian Jacques Dutrey described Kurtzman's style as "movement and shapes, energy and aesthetics".

Many liken Kurtzman's working method to that of an auteur. In developing stories in this way Kurtzman aimed to reach a balance between text and graphics. He developed a way of creating stories incrementally, beginning with a paragraph-long treatment of the story. After deciding on a story and an ending which had impact, he laid out thumbnail sketches in miniature, with captions and dialogue. He proceeded to revise repeatedly on tracing paper, tacking one layer on top of another, as he worked out "what characters have to say". He prepared layouts on large pieces of vellum to pass on to the artists, with supplemental photographs and drawings, and personally led the artist through the story before the finished artwork was begun. According to Jack Davis, "When you'd pick up a story, Harvey would sit down with you and he ... acted it out, all the way through ... You felt like you'd lived the story."

Typically when working on Little Annie Fanny, after researching the background story, Kurtzman prepared a penciled layout on Bristol board a color guide for Elder on an 8 1/2-by-11-inch (22 cm × 28 cm) vellum overlay. He would then create a larger version of the page on vellum with a 10 1/2-by-15-inch (27 cm × 38 cm) image area, which he would create using colored markers, working his way up from lighter to darker colors as he tightened the composition. He then traced this onto another sheet of vellum, or more if still unsatisfied with the results. He would pass this on to Elder to render the final image following Kurtman's layouts exactly after having the image transferred to illustration board.

Kurtzman's layouts owed considerable debt to Will Eisner's work on The Spirit. He derived a chiaroscuro technique from Milt Caniff in his 1940s studio work.

== Legacy ==
Along with cartoonists such as Will Eisner, Jack Kirby, and Carl Barks, Kurtzman is regularly cited as one of the defining creators of the Golden Age of American comic books. In 2003, The New York Times described Kurtzman as "one of the most important figures in postwar America" over Mad's influence on popular culture. This was an upgrade from the Times' obituary for Kurtzman in 1993, which said he had "helped found Mad Magazine." This prompted an angry response to the newspaper from Art Spiegelman, who complained that awarding Kurtzman partial credit for starting Mad was "like saying Michelangelo helped paint the Sistine Chapel just because some Pope owned the ceiling."

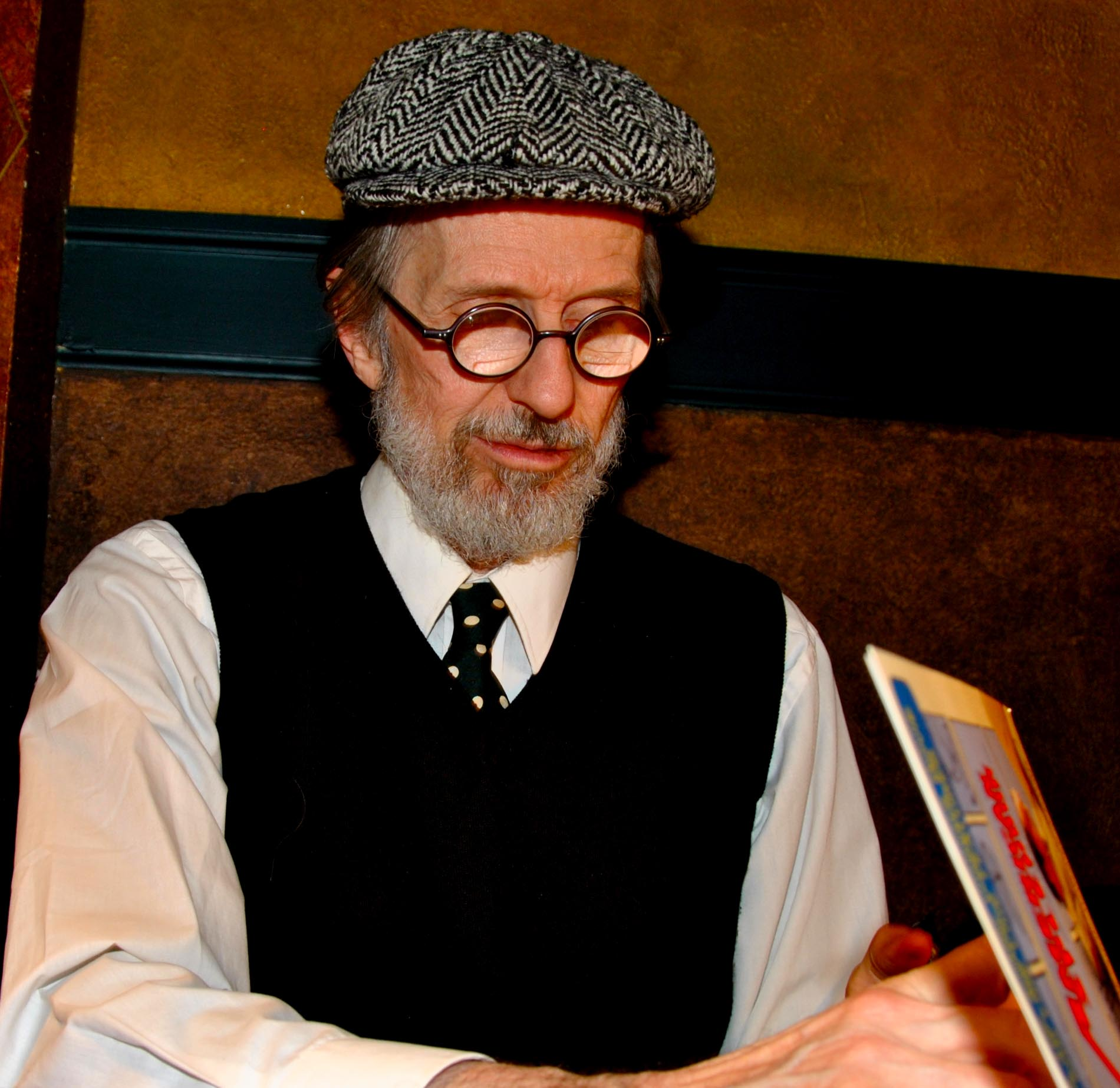
Kurtzman mentored cartoonists such as Robert Crumb.

Kurtzman acted as mentor to a large number of cartoonists, such as Terry Gilliam, Robert Crumb, and Gilbert Shelton. Students of his at the School of Visual Arts included John Holmstrom, Batton Lash, and Drew Friedman. Kurtzman, and particularly his work on Mad, is the most frequently cited influence on the underground comix movement—comics historian Mark Estren called Mad "the granddaddy of the underground comics". In 1958, Robert Crumb and his older brother Charles self-published three issues of the Humbug-inspired fanzine Foo in 1958. The venture was not a financial success, and Crumb turned to producing comics to satisfy himself. In 1964 Kurtzman published his work in Help!.

Kurtzman's style of humor influenced countercultural comedians from the 1960s on, including the sketch comedy series Saturday Night Live, according to member Harry Shearer. Help! contributor Terry Gilliam, who went on to be a member of Monty Python, called Kurtzman "[i]n many ways ... one of the godparents of Monty Python". In his 1985 film Brazil, Terry Gilliam gave Ian Holm's character the name "Kurtzmann". Underground cartoonist Robert Crumb asserted that one of Kurtzman's cover images for Humbug "changed [his] life" and that another Mad cover image "changed the way [he] saw the world forever!" On Kurtzman's influence Time editor Richard Corliss stated, "Almost all American satire today follows a formula that Harvey Kurtzman thought up."

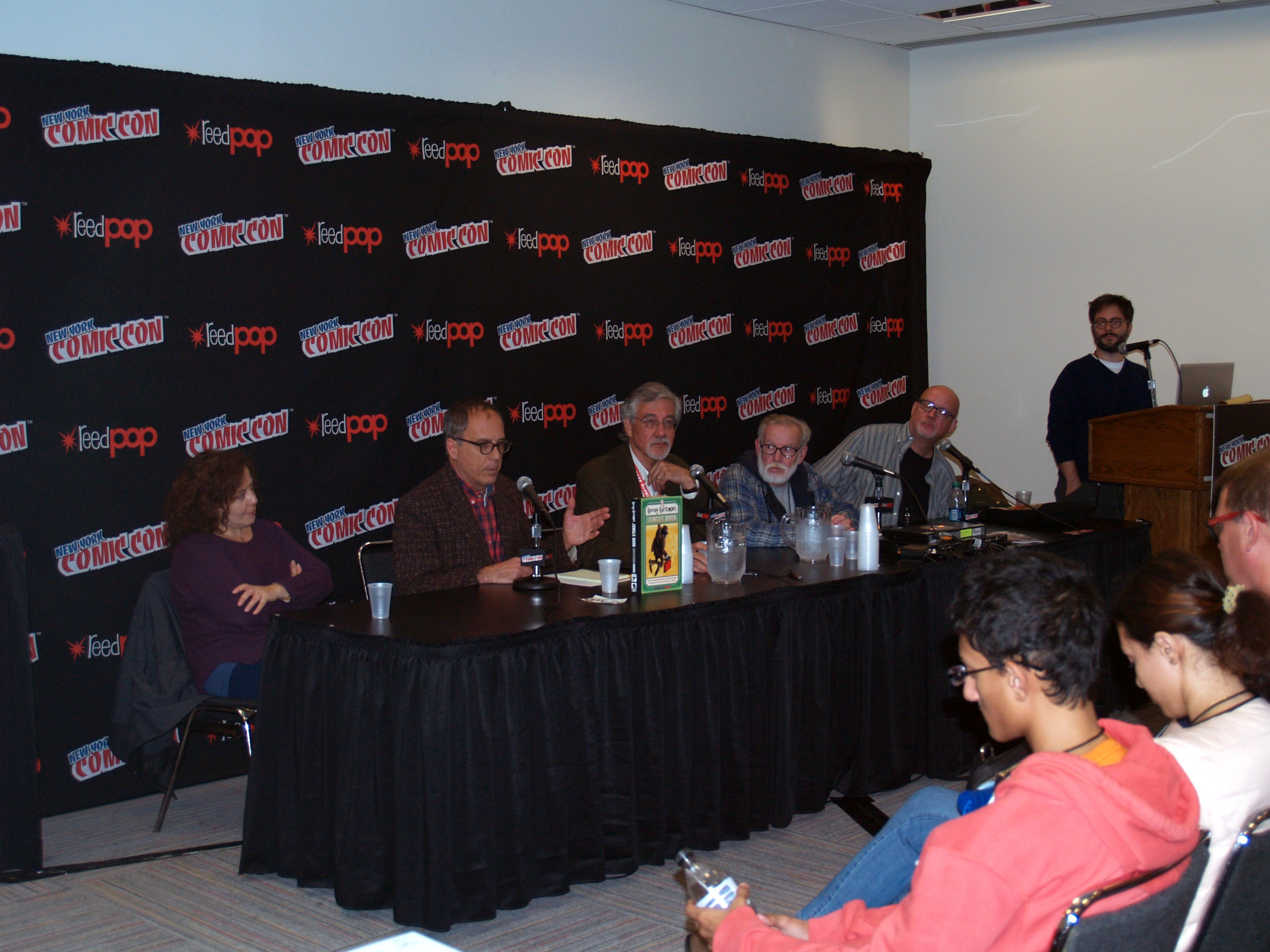
Discussion panel on Jungle Book at the 2014 New York Comic Con. From left to right are Kurtzman's daughter, Nellie, David Hajdu, Denis Kitchen, Jay Lynch, John Holmstrom, and Bill Kartalopoulos.

While some, such as R. C. Harvey considered it a masterpiece, others such as Michael Dooley felt Little Annie Fanny was "known more for its lavish production values than its humor", or that it compromised Kurtzman's genius. A minority of underground cartoonists considered him a sell out for compromising his ideals by working for Playboy for twenty-six years. Many fans consider Help! to be Kurtzman's "last hurrah".

The Kirby Awards came to an end in 1987, and the Harvey Awards and Eisner Awards took its place. Named in Kurtzman's honor, the Harveys are administered by Fantagraphics Books, and nominees and winners are selected by comics professionals. Kurtzman was one of seven cartoonists featured in the traveling "Masters of American Comics" exhibition in 2005–2006.

To Comics Journal editor and Fantagraphics publisher Gary Groth, Kurtzman's style "achieves some sort of Platonic ideal of cartooning. Harvey was a master of composition, tone and visual rhythm, both within the panel and among the panels comprising the page. He was also able to convey fragments of genuine humanity through an impressionistic technique that was fluid and supple." Comics critic and historian R. C. Harvey conjectured that Kurtzman "may be the most influential American cartoonist since Walt Disney", and comics historian Don Markstein considered him "among the most influential cartoonists of the 20th century". In its list of 100 best English-language comics of the 20th century, The Comics Journal awarded Kurtzman five of the slots:

8. Mad #1–24, 1952–1956, Edited by Harvey Kurtzman
12. The War Comics of Harvey Kurtzman, 1950–1955, Harvey Kurtzman and various
26. Harvey Kurtzman's Jungle Book, 1959
63. Hey Look!, 1946–1949, Harvey Kurtzman
64. Goodman Beaver, 1962, Harvey Kurtzman & Will Elder

In 2012, Kurtzman's estate and Al Feldstein filed to reclaim the copyrights on their 1950s work at EC. The claim was based on changes to copyright laws made in 1976, in which copyrights sold could be reclaimed by the original independent creators at the time of copyright renewal. The basis of the Kurtzman and Feldstein claims was that they were not employees of EC, but subcontractors.

Comics collector Glenn Bray published The Illustrated Harvey Kurtzman Index in 1976, a complete guide to everything Kurtzman had published to that point. Howard Zimmerman adapted interviews with Kurtzman conducted by Zimmerman and Byron Preiss into a short autobiography in 1988 titled Harvey Kurtzman: My Life as a Cartoonist. Denis Kitchen and Paul Buhle produced a biography of Kurtzman in 2009 titled The Art of Harvey Kurtzman: The Mad Genius of Comics, with an introduction by comedian Harry Shearer. Bill Schelly spent three years to research and write another, longer one in 2015, titled Harvey Kurtzman: The Man Who Created MAD and Revolutionized Humor in America, with an introduction by Terry Gilliam.

In 2014, Dark Horse Comics via their Kitchen Sink Books imprint began reprinting deluxe, expanded editions of Kurtzman work in The Essential Kurtzman series, beginning with Harvey Kurtzman’s Jungle Book, edited and designed by John Lind and including new essays on the work from Lind, Denis Kitchen, R.Crumb, Peter Poplaski, and an introduction by Gilbert Shelton. The work received two nominations (Best Reprint and Excellence in Publication) in the 2015 Harvey Awards. The second volume in the series Playboy’s TRUMP, a collection of the 1950s satire magazine created by Kurtzman and Hugh Hefner, was published in 2016.
