= Ziggy Pig and Silly Seal =

- Ziggy Pig-Silly Seal Comics #6 (Sept. 1946); Cover artist unknown

Publication information
- Publisher: Marvel Comics
- First appearance: Krazy Komics #1 (July 1942)
- Created by: Al Jaffee

In-story information
- Species: Ziggy Pig: Pig; Silly Seal: Seal

Ziggy Pig and Silly Seal are fictional, talking animal comic-book characters created by cartoonist Al Jaffee for Marvel Comics' 1940s predecessor, Timely Comics, during the Golden Age of Comic Books.

Initially appearing as individual stars of solo features in the comedy anthology Krazy Komics #1 (cover dated July 1942), they were soon teamed to become, along with Super Rabbit, the most prominent stars of what Timely called its "animation" comics. With such Krazy Komics cohorts as Toughy Cat, the anthropomorphic duo are among the first talking-animal characters created specifically for the fledgling medium of comic books, rather than adapted from film, comic strips, or other media. Some stories used the logo Silly Seal and Ziggy Pig, and at least one used simply Silly and Ziggy.

== Publication history ==
Ziggy Pig and Silly Seal were created by cartoonist Al Jaffee for Timely Comics, a predecessor of Marvel Comics, in the comedy anthology comic book Krazy Komics #1 (cover dated July 1942). Jaffee recalled in a 2004 interview,

I created Ziggy Pig and Silly Seal from scratch. [Editor-in-chief] Stan [Lee] said to me, 'Create an animated-type character. Something different, something new'. I searched around and thought, 'I’ve never seen anyone do anything about a seal', so I made him the lead character. So I created 'Silly Seal'. One day, Stan said to me, 'Why don’t you give him a little friend of some sort?' I had already created Ziggy Pig, who had his own little feature, so it was quite easy to combine them into one series. I said, 'How about Ziggy Pig?' Stan said, 'Okay!' I should add that, while I created Ziggy Pig, it was Stan who named him.

Animal Fun 3-D (Dec. 1953). Cover artist unknown.

Aside from Jaffee, artists associated with the feature include Joe Calcagno, Harvey Eisenberg, Al Fago, Al Genet, and Mike Sekowsky.

Following their individual debuts, Ziggy Pig and Silly Seal were teamed and became stars of Timely Comics' children's-comedy line. They first appeared together on a cover with Krazy Komics #5 (Jan. 1943), and continued as the cover feature through #24 (Sept. 1946), generally with their regular antagonist, Toughy Cat; they also appeared on the ensemble cover of the final issue, #26 (Fall 1946).

Ziggy and Silly became the cover stars of all eight issues of Animated Funny Comic-Tunes (#16-23, Summer 1944 - Fall 1946; Silly not on cover of #18), all seven issues of Silly Tunes (Fall 1945 - April 1947; as part of ensemble on last issue), on issues of Ideal Comics, and elsewhere. They appear on the Super Rabbit-dominated ensemble covers on all but issues #10 & 12 of the dozen-issue All Surprise Comics (Fall 1943 - Winter 1946), and in both the ensemble covers and their own covers on all six issues of Comic Capers (Fall 1944 - Fall 1946). Ziggy and Silly headlined their own six-issue Ziggy Pig-Silly Seal Comics (Jan. 1944 - Sept. 1946).

Silly Tunes #7 (April 1947) marked their final Golden Age appearance. After this era, they reappeared in the one-shot 3-D comic book, Animal Fun 3-D (Dec. 1953), from Premier Magazines. Ziggy and Silly also appeared in issues of the unauthorized reprint titles Billy And Buggy Bear, Wacky Duck, Super Rabbit, and Ziggy Pig from Israel Waldman's I. W. Publications / Super Comics, for a short time beginning in 1958.

Ziggy Pig, Silly Seal, and several other Timely animal characters appear in the Marvel Adventures: Fantastic Four issue "A Timely Family Appearance". Previously, Ziggy appeared in the non-canonical novelty humor comic Marvel Fumetti Book #1 (April 1984), by writer Mike Carlin and artists Vince Colletta and Terry Austin.

Ziggy and Silly appear in Deadpool (2018) #8, with the latter hiring Deadpool. A later one-shot reveals that the actual culprit was Silly's lookalike cousin Willy.

On August 19, 2022, Marvel released a Ziggy Pig and Silly Seal limited series on the Marvel Unlimited app.

== Fictional character biographies ==
Ziggy Pig and Silly Seal are a type of traditional comedy duo, the straight man and the stooge. Ziggy, who wears a blue hat and a black and yellow sweater with a red "Z", is the slightly smarter of the two, with Silly, a white seal with a toboggan cap and a scarf, the bumbling but occasionally triumphant sidekick. The two often find themselves united on comic book covers against antagonist Toughy Cat.

== In other media ==
Ziggy Pig makes a cameo appearance in Bill & Ted's Excellent Adventure.
