= R. O. Blechman =

American cartoonist

- Born: Oscar Robert Blechman; October 1, 1930 (age 96); Brooklyn, New York City, New York
- Known for: Animator, cartoonist
- Awards: Art Directors Hall of Fame, 1999; Emmy Award, 1984; Adweek Illustrator of the Year, 1983; National Cartoonists Society Lifetime Achievement Award 2010
- Website: roblechman.com

R. O. Blechman (born October 1, 1930) is an American animator, illustrator, children's-book author, graphic novelist and editorial cartoonist whose work has been the subject of retrospectives at the Museum of Modern Art and other institutions. He was inducted into the Art Directors Hall of Fame in 1999.

Blechman's best-known works include the book The Juggler of Our Lady (1953), television commercials for Alka-Seltzer (1967) and other products, the animated PBS special Great Performances: The Soldier's Tale; a minute-long CBS Christmas greeting (1966); and numerous covers for The New Yorker magazine.

== Life and career ==
Oscar Robert Blechman, whose professional name transposes the initials of his first two given names, was born in Brooklyn, New York City, New York, and attended the High School of Music and Art and Oberlin College, where he drew cartoons for the student newspaper, The Oberlin Review. Henry Holt published his first book, The Juggler of Our Lady, a Christmas retelling of the medieval legend, in 1953. Five years later, it was adapted into a nine-minute Terrytoons animated short by Al Kouzel and Gene Deitch, narrated by Boris Karloff. The short earned a BAFTA Award nomination for Best Animated Film.

After being drafted into the United States Army and serving in Asbury Park, New Jersey, he was invited by animator John Hubley to join the advertising studio Storyboard Inc., where Blechman learned animation. He expanded into spot illustration and sequential-panel illustration for such magazines as Harper's Bazaar, Trump, Punch, Esquire, Humbug, Theater Arts and Show; a humorous print campaign for Capezio shoes; and drawings for Irving Trust bank, The New School, and D'Orsay perfumes, among others. His 1967 TV commercial for Alka-Seltzer, for which he created the storyboard and drawings, "remains a classic of American advertising".

During the 1970s, Blechman penned Vietnam War editorial cartoons for the liberal alternative weekly The Village Voice. That same decade, he produced the PBS Christmas television special Simple Gifts (1977), which used his segment "No Room at the Inn", along with segments by fellow illustrators Maurice Sendak, James McMullan, Seymour Chwast, and Charles B. Slackman. In 1978 or 1979, Blechman founded the commercial-animation studio The Ink Tank.

Blechman directed the 1984 PBS special The Soldier's Tale, an animated, one-hour adaptation of composer Igor Stravinsky's and playwright C. F. Ramuz's theater piece L'Histoire du Soldat. The special won the Emmy Award for Outstanding Individual Achievement – Animated Programming.

The Museum of Modern Art mounted the retrospective "R. O. Blechman and The Ink Tank: A Celebration", beginning January 17, 2003.

Blechman wrote and illustrated the 2007 children's book Franklin the Fly; and wrote the book Dear James: Letters to a Young Illustrator. His graphic stories are collected in Talking Lines. The French publisher Delpire published a collection of his artwork for the series "Poche Illustrateur", and his graphic novel Georgie.

== Personal life ==
Blechman and his wife, Moisha Kubinyi, the daughter of painters Doris Hall and Kálmán Kubinyi, lived on Central Park West in Manhattan through 2003, moving that year to their weekend home in Ancram, New York. They have two sons: Nicholas, who at various points was the art editor of The New York Times Book Review and the creative director of The New Yorker, and Max, who edited the collection Revolutionary Romanticism: A Drunken Boat Anthology.

== Awards and honors ==
- Adweek Illustrator of the Year, 1983
- AIGA Design Archives: The Soldier's Tale poster in category Promotional Design and Advertising, 1984
- Inductee, Art Director's Hall of Fame, 1999
- National Cartoonists Society Milton Caniff Lifetime Achievement Award, 2011

=== Primetime Emmy Awards and nomination ===
- 1983 Nomination: Outstanding Individual Achievement - Graphic Design and Title Sequences: Nicholas Nickleby (syndicated), R.O. Blechman, Seymour Chwast, Andy Ewan, graphic designers
- 1984 Award: Outstanding Individual Achievement - Animated Programming: The Soldier's Tale (PBS), R.O. Blechman, director
