= Jack Davis (cartoonist) =

American cartoonist

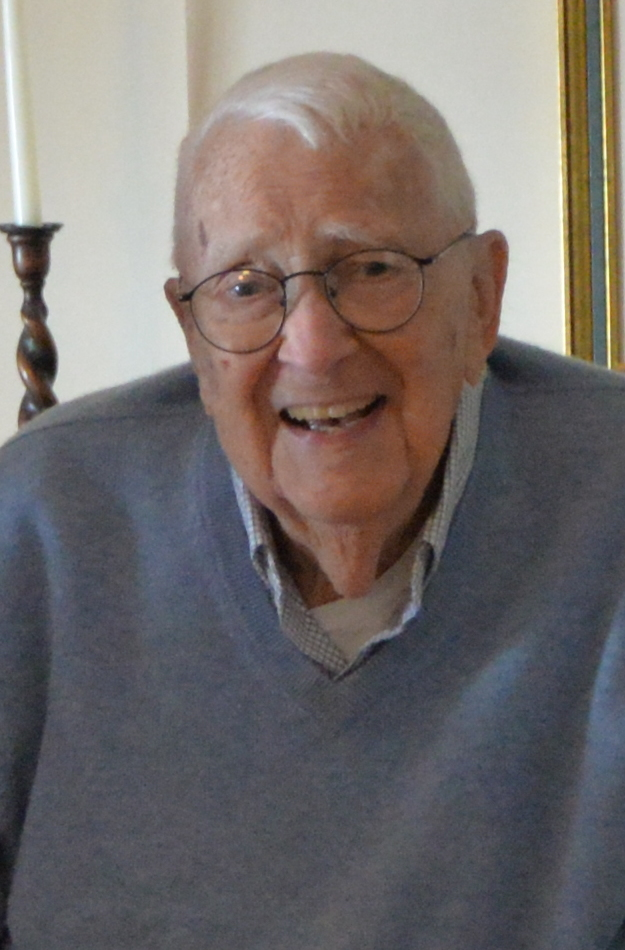
- Davis in 2015
- Born: John Burton Davis Jr. December 2, 1924; Atlanta, Georgia, U.S.
- Died: July 27, 2016 (aged 91); St. Simons, Georgia, U.S.
- Occupations: Cartoonist and illustrator
- Years active: 1950–2014
- Spouse: Dena Roquemore (m. 1950)
- Children: 2

John Burton Davis Jr. (December 2, 1924 – July 27, 2016) was an American cartoonist and illustrator, known for his advertising art, magazine covers, film posters, record album art, and numerous comic book stories. He was one of the founding cartoonists for Mad in 1952. His cartoon characters are characterized by extremely exaggerated anatomy, including big heads, skinny legs, and large feet.

== Early life ==
Davis was born December 2, 1924, in Atlanta, Georgia. As a child, he enjoyed listening to Bob Hope on the radio and tried to draw him, despite not knowing what Hope looked like.

== Career ==
=== Early work ===
Davis saw comic book publication at the age of 12 when he contributed a cartoon to the reader's page of Tip Top Comics No. 9 (December 1936). After drawing for his high school newspaper and yearbook, he spent three years in the United States Navy during World War II, where he contributed to the daily Navy News.

Attending the University of Georgia on the G.I. Bill, he drew for the campus newspaper and helped launch an off-campus humor publication, Bullsheet, which he described as "not political or anything but just something with risque jokes and cartoons." After graduation, he was a cartoonist intern at The Atlanta Journal, and he worked one summer inking Ed Dodd's Mark Trail comic strip, a strip which he later parodied in Mad as Mark Trade.

=== Comic strips and comic books ===
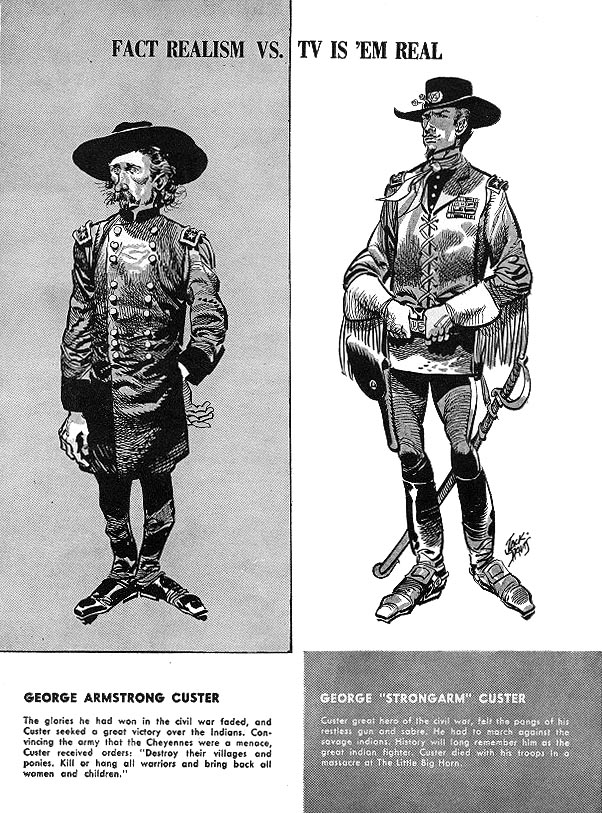
Davis's flair for caricature made him a natural choice for satire magazines such as Mad, Cracked, Trump, Humbug and Help!

In 1949, Davis illustrated a Coca-Cola training manual, a job that gave him enough money to buy a car and drive to New York. Attending the Art Students League of New York, he found work with the Herald Tribune Syndicate as an inker on Leslie Charteris's The Saint comic strip, drawn by Mike Roy in 1949–1950. His own humor strip, Beauregard, with gags in a Civil War setting, was carried briefly by the McClure Syndicate. After rejections from several comic book publishers, he began freelancing for William Gaines's EC Comics in 1950, contributing to Tales from the Crypt, The Vault of Horror, The Haunt of Fear, Frontline Combat, Two-Fisted Tales, Piracy, Incredible Science Fiction, Crime Suspenstories, Shock Suspenstories and Terror Illustrated.

In 2011, Davis told The Wall Street Journal about his early career and his breakthrough with EC:

I was about ready to give up, go home to Georgia and be either a forest ranger or a farmer. But I went down to Canal Street and Lafayette, up in an old rickety elevator and through a glass door to Entertaining Comics where Al Feldstein and Bill Gaines were putting out horror [comic] books. They looked at my work and it was horrible and they gave me a job right away! Every time you went in to see Bill Gaines, he would write you a check when you brought in a story. You didn't have to put in a bill or anything. I was very, very hungry and I was thinking about getting married. So I kept the road pretty hot between home and Canal Street. I would go in for that almighty check, go home and do the work, bring it in and get another check and pick up another story. [The actual cross street to Lafayette was Spring Street, not Canal.]

Davis was particularly noted for his depiction of the Crypt-Keeper in the horror comics, revamping the character's appearance from the more simplistic Al Feldstein version to a tougher, craggier, mangier man with hairy warts, salivating mouth and oversized hands and feet, who usually did not wear shoes. Among the classic horror tales he illustrated were "Foul Play", which was cited in Dr. Fredric Wertham's book Seduction of the Innocent for its depiction of "a comic book baseball game". Others, like "Tain't the Meat, It's the Humanity", "Death of Some Salesman", "Fare Tonight Followed by Increasing Clottiness", "Tight Grip" and "Lower Berth", were Crypt-Keeper classics. He did the covers for every issue of Crypt from issue No. 29 to No. 46. In his work for Harvey Kurtzman's war comics, he tackled a variety of subjects and had a particular affinity for depicting American Civil War stories. He also did many covers for Frontline Combat, Two-Fisted Tales and Incredible Science Fiction as well. The editors, William M. Gaines, Albert B. Feldstein and Harvey Kurtzman, have said he was the fastest artist they had in those days, completely penciling and inking three or more pages a day at times. His use of the brush to create depth and mood was unique and memorable. His wrinkled clothing, scratchy lines, and multi-layered layouts were so popular in the 1950s that other artists at rival companies began copying the style—notably, Howard Nostrand in Harvey's horror comics. In the late 1950s, Davis drew Western stories for Atlas Comics. His 1963 work on the Rawhide Kid (#33–35) was his last for non-humor comic books.

His style of wild, free-flowing brushwork and wacky characters made him a perfect choice when Harvey Kurtzman launched Mad as a zany, satirical EC comic book in 1952. He appeared in most of the first 30 issues of Mad, all 12 issues of Panic and even some work in Cracked. Davis contributed to other Kurtzman magazines—Trump, Humbug and Help!—eventually expanding into illustrations for record jackets, movie posters, books and magazines, including Time and TV Guide. In 1959, he completed an 88-card set of humorous cartoons for Topps Chewing Gum Co. called Wacky Plaks, also a 66-card monster-themed set called "You'll Die Laughing", and a 66-card set of Funny Valentine cards. In 1960, Davis illustrated another 66-card set of Funny Valentine cards and in 1961, a set of Giant Funny Valentine cards. In 1964, he illustrated a set of Nutty Awards postcards, also released by Topps Chewing Gum Co., and in 1980 he helped illustrate a set of Topps Bazooka Wanted Posters. Davis illustrated two children's picture books, Bobby and the Magic Pen and The Misadventures of Don Quixote (both still available online). He also has a first-published book of his sketches on Amazon, "The Jack Davis Sketchbook of Untold Spooky Ghost Stories". Davis enjoyed his sketches more than his final artwork because he felt it represented his creative talents.

In 1961, Davis wrote, drew and edited his own comic book, Yak Yak, for Dell Comics. In 1965, he illustrated Meet The North American Indians by Elizabeth Payne, published by Random House as part of their children's Step Up Books line. (ISBN 0-394-80060-5).

Davis' art appeared in 29 of the first 31 issues of Mad, totaling 66 articles, covers and house ads. But when editor Harvey Kurtzman quit the magazine following a dispute with publisher Bill Gaines, Davis chose to leave with him. He returned as a regular contributor to Mad magazine in 1965, starting with the cover for the paperback It's a World, World, World, World MAD, in which he parodied his own poster art for the comedy film It's a Mad, Mad, Mad, Mad World. Davis would remain with Mad for more than 30 years until his retirement. His work appeared in 211 of the next 255 issues. He also drew 14 covers for the magazine.

Davis had a regular comic strip feature, Superfan, in Pro Quarterback magazine in the early 1970s. It was written by his Mad cohort, Nick Meglin.

=== Advertising and magazines ===
Davis first worked with TV Guide in 1965, which hired him to illustrate an expansive eight-page advertising supplement for NBC's TV lineup, which featured icons such as Johnny Carson, Dean Martin, and fictional characters such as Dr. Kildare, Napoleon Solo, and Maxwell Smart. His first cover for the magazine came in 1968, when he depicted a tribute to Andy Griffith, in which the actor was hoisted on the shoulders of his costars, Don Knotts and Jim Nabors. Davis recalls, "Every assignment was a thrill because TV Guide was the top magazine in the country. I couldn't wait to get in my little MG and drive from New York out to the magazine's offices in Radnor, Pennsylvania, to show the editors my latest design. I felt like the luckiest guy in the world." Davis would contribute 23 covers for TV Guide between 1968 and 1981. In 2013 the magazine honored him in a retrospective in which it recounted his history with the publication and spotlighted some of his most memorable covers, including those depicting Rowan & Martin's Laugh-In (March 28, 1970), Davis's childhood hero Bob Hope for a cover on Hope's history with the Oscars (April 10, 1971), and Bonanza (August 14, 1971). Years later, while watching a TV interview of Hope, Davis was gratified to notice that his Hope cover was displayed on the back wall of the comedian's office; "it was one of the proudest moments of my life," recalled Davis.

Davis created the cartoon bee which (in decal form) appears on the flanks of all the buses in the Bee-Line running from Westchester to New York City. A Westchester resident at the time, Davis lived directly adjacent to one of the Bee Line's bus routes, and he mentioned in an interview how gratifying it was to see his own artwork drive past his window several times every day. Similar synchronicity happened when Mad moved to 1700 Broadway, where the magazine's fifth-floor production department was next to a wall three feet away that had previously been the location of an immense Davis cartoon for a bank, an advertisement that towered six stories over 53rd Street.

=== Films, posters and cover art ===
Like fellow Mad alumnus Paul Coker Jr., Davis also contributed to Rankin-Bass productions; his character designs are featured in Mad Monster Party?, Coneheads, and the cartoon series The King Kong Show, The Jackson 5ive, and The Osmonds. For Raid insecticide, Davis created the animated bug that screamed "Raid?!" Phil Kimmelman Associates created several commercials designed by Davis and animated in his style.

Davis produced the artwork for the poster for the comedy chase film It's a Mad, Mad, Mad, Mad World (1963). In 2014, he remembered an experience from that year: "My dad had Parkinson's disease, and he paid me a visit. He really had not been to New York in—well, ever—and he came out of the station and saw the signboard [advertising the film], very big signboard in Times Square. That was a big thrill. Little old me ..."

Two years later, he parodied his own Mad, Mad, Mad, Mad World image for the cover of the Mad paperback It's a World, World, World, World Mad, his first work for the magazine following an almost seven-year hiatus. Having returned, Davis would remain a regular freelancer for more than thirty years. When the Criterion Collection released the film on DVD and Blu-ray in 2014, Davis provided new illustrations for the accompanying booklet.

Davis's artwork for the comedy Western Viva Max! (1969) formed the centerpiece of that film's promotional campaign, and he did the same for the film Kelly's Heroes in 1970. His poster for Robert Altman's The Long Goodbye (1973) presented the film in a comic light.

In 1963, Davis produced a work of cover art for the Richard Wolfe album, Many Happy Returns of the Day! released by MGM Records, and designed the Homer and Jethro album, Homer and Jethro Go West (RCA Victor).

In 1964, Davis created the cover art for The New Christy Minstrels album for Columbia Records which featured songs from the light-hearted Western comedy Advance to the Rear.

In 1966, Davis created the cover art for the Johnny Cash album Everybody Loves a Nut. Davis also created album artwork for such musicians as The Guess Who, Tito Puente, Sailcat and The Cowsills, as well as for such comedians as Bob and Ray, Archie Campbell, Don Imus and Myron Cohen. He also provided the artwork for several of Sheb Wooley's comic albums as his character Ben Colder. In 1974, Davis provided artwork for Atco Records' printed advertisements of the Genesis album The Lamb Lies Down on Broadway.

During his tenure with Mad, Davis's specialty was drawing sports-themed articles. This led to his work for Paramount Pictures, painting the poster for The Bad News Bears (1976).

=== Mascot ===
While Davis resided on St. Simons Island, Georgia, he sketched various characters and mascots for the College of Coastal Georgia in Brunswick, Georgia. His drawing of the Mariner, Captain Jack, was ultimately selected by the college students and staff as the official school mascot.

== Personal life and death ==
Davis grew up and went to college in Georgia. Following his professional career in New York, Davis and his wife Dena moved to St. Simons Island, Georgia, in the 1990s. They raised two children: daughter Katie Davis Lloyd and son Jack Davis III, who gave the cause of his father's death on July 27, 2016, at age 91 as complications from a stroke.

== Awards and exhibitions ==
Davis was inducted into the Will Eisner Hall of Fame in 2003. He received the National Cartoonists Society's Milton Caniff Lifetime Achievement Award in 1996. A finalist for inclusion in the Jack Kirby Hall of Fame in 1990, 1991, and 1992, he received the National Cartoonists Society's Advertising Award for 1980 and their Reuben Award for 2000. He was award the Inkpot Award in 1985.

In June 2002, Davis had a retrospective exhibition of his work at the Society of Illustrators in New York. He was inducted into the Society of Illustrators Hall of Fame in 2005.

In 1989, Davis was commissioned by the United States Postal Service to design the 25-cent Letter Carriers stamp. There was some concern that the cartoon would offend some letter carriers as being too informal and not respectful of their position. However, the president of the Letter Carriers Union gave his blessing, and the stamp was well received. Although postal policy does not allow artists to portray living persons on stamps, one of the carriers in the stamp is an unmistakable self-portrait of Davis.

In 2019, Davis was posthumously awarded the Inkwell Awards Stacey Aragon Special Recognition Award for his lifetime of work in the inking field.

== See also ==
- List of TV Guide covers
- Richard Amsel
- Frank McCarthy
- Bob Peak
- Drew Struzan
- Howard Terpning
