= Super Rabbit =

- Super Rabbit Comics #6 (Spring 1946). Cover artist unknown

Publication information
- Publisher: Timely Comics
- First appearance: Comedy Comics #14 (Mar. 1943)
- Created by: Ernie Hart

In-story information
- Alter ego: Waffles Bunny
- Team affiliations: Pet Avengers
- Notable aliases: The Marvel of the Age
- Abilities: Super strength Flight; Invulnerability except for a single spot at top of head

Super Rabbit is a talking animal superhero in american comic books published by Timely Comics, a predecessor of Marvel Comics, during the 1930s and 1940s period fans and historians call the Golden Age of comic books. Created by cartoonist Ernie Hart, he first appeared in Comedy Comics #14 (cover-dated Mar. 1943).

The character appeared after Fawcett Comics' talking-animal superhero Hoppy the Marvel Bunny (debut: Fawcett's Funny Animals #1, cover-dated Dec. 1942), and before the Bugs Bunny theatrical cartoon short "Super-Rabbit" (released in April 1943).

== Publication history ==
Following his debut as the cover star of Comedy Comics #14 (March 1943), Super Rabbit remained the lead feature through #33 (Sept. 1946). A star of Timely Comics' humor division — produced by what the company called its "animator bullpen", edited by Vincent Fago and largely separate from the superhero group producing comics featuring Captain America and other such characters — Super Rabbit also appeared in Krazy Comics, Comic Capers, Funny Tunes (a.k.a. Animated Funny Comic-Tunes), All Surprise Comics (as the cover star of #1-11, Fall 1943 - Fall 1946) and other anthology series.

He additionally starred in his own Super Rabbit Comics, which ran 14 issues (Fall 1944 - Nov. 1948). His final story was It's a Duck's Life #11 (Feb. 1952).

While a series of authorized reprints of Super Rabbit's adventures was published in Canada by Bell Features, three known unauthorized reprint issues appeared from Israel Waldman's I.W. Publishing beginning in 1958, with issues #1-2 released that year. A third issue, labeled #7 and costing 10¢, later appeared, and was reissued in 1963 as #10 and costing 12¢.

Aside from creator Ernie Hart, other artists who contributed to his adventures included Mike Sekowsky, Al Jaffee, and inker Violet Barclay.

In 1977, Marvel announced a reboot of the character in a solo series with Marv Wolfman as writer, but apparently this project did not come to fruition.

== Fictional character biography ==
Waffles Bunny, variously depicted as a reporter or a shoeshine boy, rubs a magic ring to transform into Super Rabbit, who is virtually invulnerable except for a spot on the top of his head. He protects the innocent, captures robbers, and battles enemies such as Super Nazi, a mustachioed pig. Waffles' self-proclaimed "number-one fan" and publicist, Wilbur Woodpecker, occasionally accompanies him, much to his consternation.

== In other media ==
Waffles, a non-anthropomorphic rabbit inspired by Super Rabbit, appears in the M.O.D.O.K. episode "If This Be... M.O.D.O.K.!". He is used in therapy at A.I.M. before being stolen by MODOK and killed by a laser.
