= Al Jaffee =

American cartoonist (1921–2023)

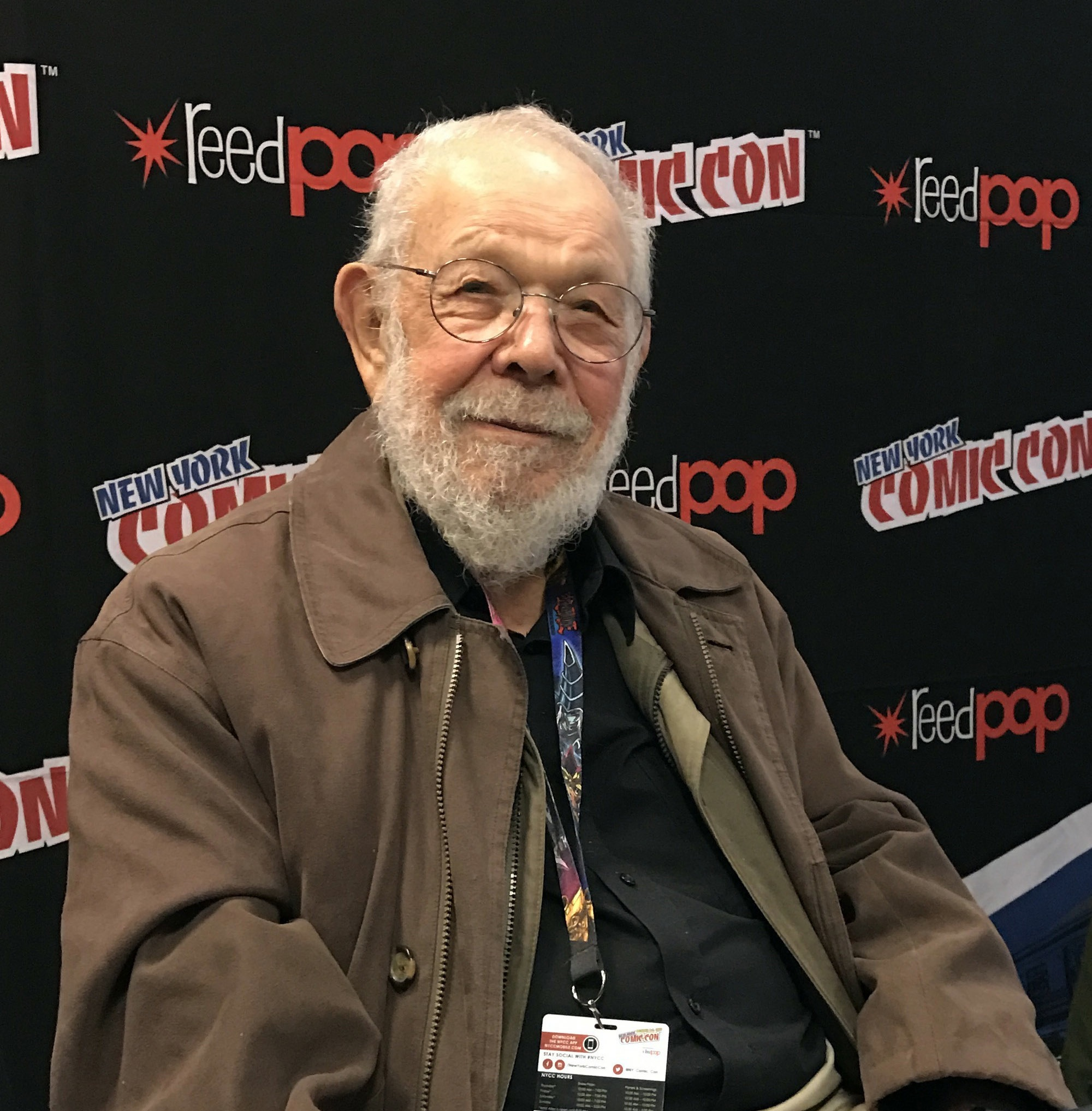
- Jaffee at the 2016 New York Comic Con
- Born: Abraham Jaffee; March 13, 1921 Savannah, Georgia, U.S.
- Died: April 10, 2023 (aged 102) New York City, U.S.
- Area: Cartoonist
- Notable works: Mad, Trump, Humbug, "Snappy Answers to Stupid Questions", Tall Tales
- Awards: Reuben Award, 2008; National Cartoonists Society Advertising and Illustration Award for 1973; Special Features Award for 1971 and 1975; Humor Comic Book Award for 1979 2013 Will Eisner Hall of Fame Award

Signature
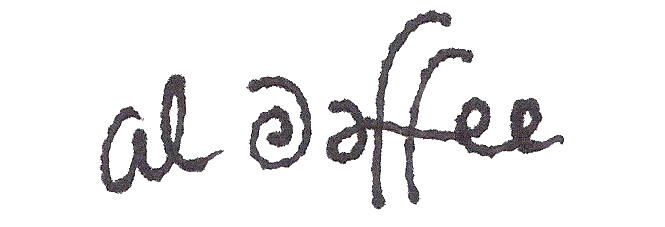

Allan Jaffee (born Abraham Jaffee; March 13, 1921 – April 10, 2023) was an American cartoonist. He was known for his work in the satirical magazine Mad, including his trademark feature, the Mad Fold-in. Jaffee was a regular contributor to the magazine for 65 years and is its longest-running contributor. In a 2010 interview, Jaffee said, "Serious people my age are dead."

With a career running from 1942 until 2020, Jaffee holds the Guinness World Record for having the longest career as a comic artist. In the half-century between April 1964 and April 2013, only one issue of Mad was published without containing new material by Jaffee.

In 2008, Jaffee was honored by the Reuben Awards as the Cartoonist of the Year. Cartoonist Arnold Roth of The New Yorker said, "Al Jaffee is one of the great cartoonists of our time." Peanuts creator Charles M. Schulz wrote, "Al can cartoon anything."

== Early life ==
Al Jaffee was born March 13, 1921, in Savannah, Georgia, to Mildred (Yiddish: מילדרעד דזשאַפֿי) and Morris Jaffee (Yiddish: מאָריס דזשאַפֿי), the eldest of four sons. His parents were Jewish immigrants from Zarasai, Lithuania. His mother was described as devoutly religious, to the point she had the crucifixes removed from the hospital room before giving birth.

In 1927, Mildred took her four sons, with Morris's consent, back to Zarasai. After a year, Morris took the family back to the United States. After another year, Mildred took the children back to Lithuania, where they lived in a shtetl. With reading material scarce in his new home, Morris mailed comic-strip clippings from the United States. Jaffee became known for his ability to trace figures like Little Orphan Annie in the sand, for the amusement of his friends as well as the local bullies. After four more years, Morris again took the eldest three sons back to the United States, where they lived in Far Rockaway, Queens. David, Jaffee's youngest brother, returned to U.S. in 1940, months before much of Zarasai's Jewish population was murdered in the Holocaust, including, apparently, Mildred herself.

Jaffee studied at the High School of Music & Art in New York City in the late 1930s, along with his brother Harry and future Mad personnel Will Elder, Harvey Kurtzman, John Severin, and Al Feldstein.

While Morris's perseverance probably saved his sons' lives, he later showed increasingly erratic behavior himself, thereby missing his son's high school graduation, and inexplicably discarding all his belongings and art projects once he left for the Army.

These experiences of perpetual absurdity and repeated alienation were later credited by his friends and wife as having sharpened his satirical edge, making him recognize that authority figures in his life could be oppressive and absurd (something he called "anti-adultism"), and quick to find nuances others miss, especially in the semantics of the English language.

== Career ==
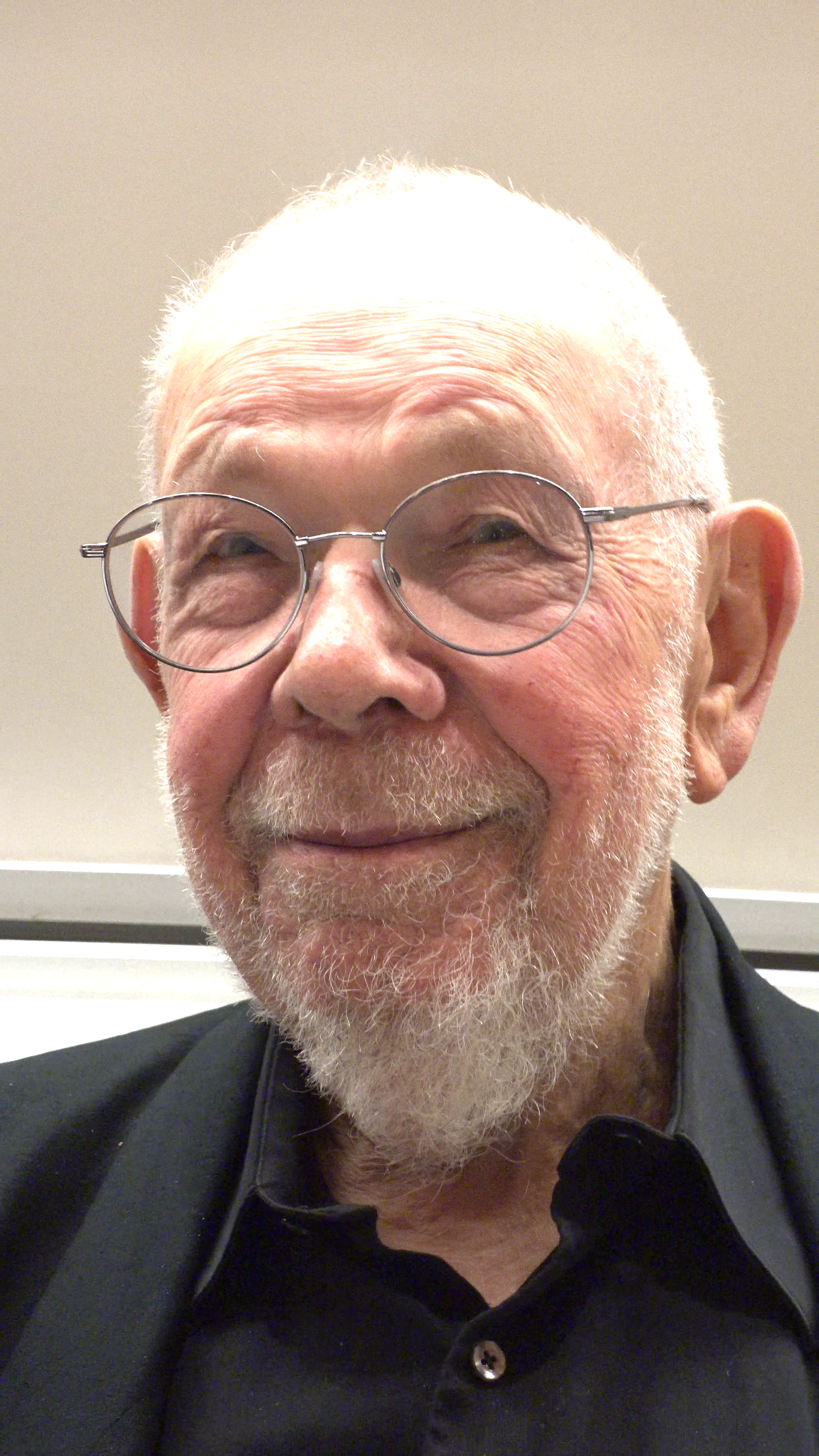
Jaffee at a talk in 2016 at the New School in NYC

Jaffee began his career in 1942, working as a comic book artist for several publications, including Joker Comics, in which he was first published in December 1942, and continuing in other comics published by Timely Comics and Atlas Comics, the 1940s and 1950s precursors of Marvel Comics. While working alongside future Mad cartoonist Dave Berg, Jaffee created several humor features for Timely, including "Inferior Man" and "Ziggy Pig and Silly Seal".

Jaffee originally considered himself strictly an artist until he was disabused of the notion by editors and art directors who were reviewing his portfolio. "When prospective clients laughed and asked 'Who wrote the gag?' my response was 'I did, sir.' Which was very confusing since I didn't realize any writing had taken place. I mean, writers used typewriters, smoked pipes, wore scarves, right? When enough of them said, 'Oh, then you're a writer too,' I took their word for it. Who was I to argue with prospective employers?"

Jaffee served in the U.S. Army during World War II, where he worked as an artist for the military in various capabilities. His work included the original floor plan for the Rusk Institute of Rehabilitation Medicine. During this time, he took advantage of the military's free name change service, first to "Alvin Jaffe" by mistake, then to "Allan Jaffee". While working at the Pentagon, he met Ruth Ahlquist, whom he married in 1945.

In 1946, Jaffee returned to civilian life, working for Stan Lee. For approximately a year and a half in the late 1940s, Jaffee was editing Timely's humor and teenage comics, including the Patsy Walker line.

Jaffee recalled in a 2004 interview:

I created Ziggy Pig and Silly Seal from scratch. [editor-in-chief] Stan [Lee] said to me, "Create an animated-type character. Something different, something new." I searched around and thought, "I've never seen anyone do anything about a seal," so I made him the lead character. So I created "Silly Seal". One day, Stan said to me, "Why don't you give him a little friend of some sort?" I had already created Ziggy Pig, who had his own little feature, so it was quite easy to combine them into one series. I said, "How about Ziggy Pig?" Stan said, "Okay!" I should add that, while I created Ziggy Pig, it was Stan who named him.

From 1957 to 1963, Jaffee drew the elongated Tall Tales panel for the New York Herald Tribune, which was syndicated to over 100 newspapers. Jaffee credited its middling success with a pantomime format that was easy to sell abroad, but his higher-ups were unsatisfied with the strip's status: "The head of the syndicate, who was a certifiable idiot, said the reason it was not selling [better] is we gotta put words in it. So, they made me put words in it. Immediately lost 28 foreign papers." A collection of Jaffee's Tall Tales strips was published in 2008. Jaffee also scripted the short-lived strips Debbie Deere and Jason in the late 1960s and early 1970s. Since 1984, Jaffee has provided illustrations for "The Shpy", a lighthearted Jewish-themed adventure feature in Tzivos Hashem's bimonthly children's publication The Moshiach Times.

=== Mad ===
Jaffee first appeared in Mad in 1955, one issue after its transformation from comic book format to magazine. When editor Harvey Kurtzman left in a dispute three issues later, Jaffee went with Kurtzman. Jaffee contributed to Kurtzman's first two post-Mad publishing efforts, Trump and the creator-owned Humbug, though both were much less successful than Mad. In 2008, the first full reprint of Humbug was published as a two-volume set by Fantagraphics; the set includes a newly commissioned cover illustration by Jaffee, and a co-interview with Jaffee and Arnold Roth.

After Humbug folded in 1958, Jaffee brought his unpublished material to Mad, which bought the work. "Bill Gaines took out every Trump and Humbug," remembered Jaffee, "called me into his office, sat me down on the couch next to him, and went over every issue and said "Which is yours?" And as he came to each one, when he saw my stuff, he OK'd to hire me."

==== The Fold-In ====
A collection of fold-ins with a self-portrait of the artist aping Alfred E. Neuman. The subtitle alludes to Abbie Hoffman's famous slogan.

In issue #86 of 1964, Jaffee created his longest-running Mad feature, the Fold-In. In each, a drawing is folded vertically and inward to reveal a new "hidden" picture (as well as a new caption). Originally, Jaffee intended it as a one-shot "cheap" satire of the triple foldouts that were appearing in glossy magazines such as Playboy, National Geographic, and Life. But Jaffee was asked to do a second installment, and soon the Fold-In became a recurring feature on the inside back cover of the magazine. In 2011, Jaffee reflected, "The thing that I got a kick out of was ... Jeopardy! showed a Fold-In and the contestants all came up with the word they were looking for, which was 'Fold-In.' So, I realized, I created an English language word."

In 2010, Jaffee described the earliest Fold-Ins:

I thought to myself ... now it's folded in and I've got to have something on the left side here, and something right side here. And the only thing that popped into my head was that Elizabeth Taylor had just dumped Eddie Fisher and was carrying on with Richard Burton. So I had Elizabeth Taylor kissing Richard Burton, and a cop is holding the crowd back – and just for the fun of it I put Eddie Fisher being trampled by the crowd. What a cruel thing to do! And then, when you fold it in, she's moving on from Richard Burton and kissing the next guy in the crowd. It's so simplistic and silly and juvenile! And anyone could have done that!

I showed it to Al Feldstein, and the first thing I said was, "Al, I've got this crazy idea, and you're not going to buy it, because it mutilates the magazine." So I put it in front of him, and the thing about Al was, he liked things that intrigued him. The mechanics of it intrigued him. He said, "You mean, you fold it, like this...? And then...?" He folded it, he unfolded it, he folded it, and then he said, "I like this!" But I said, "Al, it mutilates the magazine." And he said, "Well, I'll have to check it with Bill." He takes it, runs it to Bill's office, and he was there a little while, and he comes back and he says, "We're going to do it! You know what Bill said? Bill said, 'So they mutilate the magazine, and then they'll buy another one to save!'

Four or five weeks later, Al comes over to me and says, "When are you going to do the next Fold-In?" And I said, "I don't have another Fold-In. That was it!" So, he said, "Come on, you can come up with something else." I wracked my brain, and the only thing I could come up with was Nixon [whose face was hidden within curtain folds]. That one really set the tone for what the cleverness of the Fold-Ins has to be. It couldn't just be bringing someone from the left to kiss someone on the right.

The Fold-In became one of Mad's signature features, and it appeared in almost every issue of the magazine from 1964 to 2020. A single issue in 1977 was published without a Fold-In (though Jaffee supplied the issue's back cover), and a 1980 issue instead featured a unique double-visual gimmick by Jaffee in which the inside back cover and the outside back cover merged to create a third image when held up to the light. The third-ever Fold-In in 1964 featured a unique diagonal folding design, rather than the standard left-right vertical format. The image revealed the four members of The Beatles becoming bald (and thus losing their popularity).

In a Mad-like wrinkle, there are two answers to the question "When was Jaffee's last Fold-in?" The final one he designed appeared in the June 2019 issue. But his last Fold-in to be published, a personal farewell to readers, appeared in the August 2020 issue. Jaffee had prepared it six years in advance, to be published after his own death. Instead, it ran after he officially announced his retirement at the age of 99, as the conclusion of an "All Jaffee" tribute issue. Cartoonist Johnny Sampson succeeded Jaffee on the feature.

The Far Side creator Gary Larson described his experience with the Fold-In: "The dilemma was always this: Very slowly and carefully fold the back cover ... without creasing the page and quickly look at the joke. Jaffee's artistry before the folding was so amazing that I suspect I was not alone in not wanting to deface it in any way." In 1972, Jaffee received a Special Features Reuben Award for his Fold-Ins.

Jaffee used a computer only for typographic maneuvers to make certain Fold-In tricks easier to design and he typically took two weeks to sketch and finalize an image. Otherwise, all his work was done by hand. "I'm working on a hard, flat board ... I cannot fold it. That's why my planning has to be so correct." In 2008, Jaffee told one newspaper, "I never see the finished painting folded until it's printed in the magazine. I guess I have that kind of visual mind where I can see the two sides without actually putting them together." Contrasting current art techniques and Jaffee's approach, Mad's art director, Sam Viviano, said, "I think part of the brilliance of the Fold-In is lost on the younger generations who are so used to Photoshop and being able to do stuff like that on a computer."

=== 21st century ===
Until 2019, Jaffee continued to do the Fold-In for Mad, as well as additional artwork for articles. His last original Fold-In appeared in the June 2019 issue, which was one that had originally been rejected from the June 2013 issue due to sensitivity about gun violence. Since August 2019, Mad has been either reprinting old Fold-Ins or publishing new ones by Johnny Sampson. In December 2019, Al's original work was featured in the magazine for the last time. Mad's oldest regular contributor, Jaffee's work appeared in 500 of the magazine's first 550 issues, a total unmatched by any other writer or artist. He said, "I work for a magazine that's essentially for young people, and to have them keep me going, I feel very lucky ... To use an old cliché, I'm like an old racehorse. When the other horses are running, I want to run too." He retains the record for being longest tenured contributor to the history of Mad magazine.

In August 2008, Jaffee was interviewed for an NY1 feature about his career. He said, "It astonishes me that I still am functioning at a fairly decent level. Because there were a lot of dark days, but you have to reinvent yourself. You get knocked down and you pick up yourself and you move on."

A four-volume hardcover boxed set, The Mad Fold-In Collection: 1964–2010, was published by Chronicle Books in September 2011, ISBN 978-0811872850.

Jaffee announced in June 2020 that he would be retiring. To honor this, Mad published a tribute issue that month.

=== Frequent themes ===
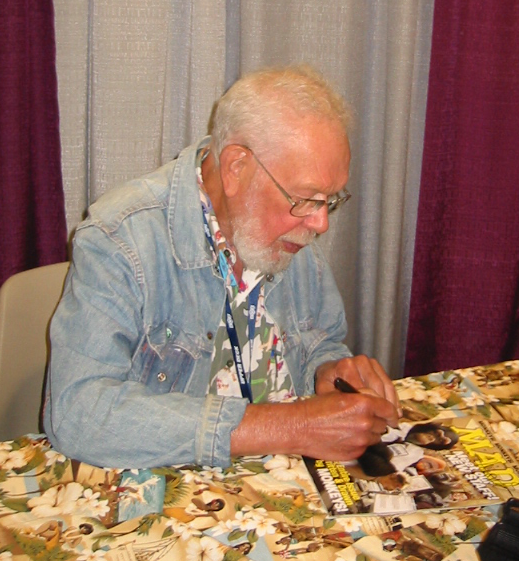
Jaffee signing in 2008

Will Forbis wrote: "This is the core of Jaffee's work: the idea that to be alive is to be constantly beleaguered by annoying idiots, poorly designed products and the unapologetic ferocity of fate. Competence and intelligence are not rewarded in life but punished." In the book Inside Mad, fellow Mad writer Desmond Devlin called Jaffee "the irreplaceable embodiment of Mad Magazine's range: smart but silly, angry but understanding, sophisticated but gross, upbeat but hopeless. ... He's uncommonly interested in figuring out how things work, and exasperated because things NEVER work."

Jaffee contributed to hundreds of Mad articles as either a writer or an artist and often both. These included his long-running "Snappy Answers to Stupid Questions", which present multiple putdowns for the same unnecessary or clueless inquiry, and several articles on inventions and gadgets, which were presented in an elaborately detailed "blueprint" style. Sergio Aragonés said of Jaffee, "He is brilliant at many things, but especially inventions. When he draws a machine for Mad, no matter how silly the idea, it always looks like it works. He thinks that way because he is not only an artist, but a technician as well ... He is the guy who can do anything." In a patent file for a self-extinguishing cigarette, the inventor thanked Jaffee for providing the inspiration. Other actual inventions that have since come to pass had appeared earlier in Jaffee articles, such as telephone redial and address books (1961), snowboarding (1965), the computer spell-checker (1967), peelable stamps, multi-blade razors (1979), and graffiti-proof building surfaces (1982). "I could imagine those things," Jaffee told an interviewer. "I never had the problem of trying to figure out how to manufacture them."

During the Vietnam War, Jaffee also created the short-lived gag cartoon Hawks & Doves, in which a military officer named Major Hawks is antagonized by Private Doves, an easygoing soldier who contrives to create surreptitious peace signs in various locations on a military base. In a 1998 issue, all the Hawks & Doves strips were republished, along with an original strip in color on the back of the issue.

Some of Jaffee's features were expanded into stand-alone books, including a 1997 collection of Fold-Ins titled Fold This Book! and eight "Snappy Answers" paperbacks. Referring to the latter, Jaffee said, "I was going through a divorce when I started that. I got a lot of my hostility out through Snappy Answers."

== Techniques and materials ==
When designing his Mad Fold-Ins, Jaffee started with the finished "answer" to the Fold-In, and then spread it apart and placed a piece of tracing paper over it in order to fill in the center "throw-away" aspect of the image, which is covered up when the page is folded over, using regular pencil at this stage. Jaffee would then trace the image onto another piece of illustration board using carbon paper. At this stage he used red or green color pencils, which were distinct from the black pencil of the original drawing, in order to discern his progress. Once the image was on the illustration board, he would then finish it by painting it. Because the illustration board was too stiff to fold, Jaffee did not see the finished Fold-In image until it was published.

== Awards and recognition ==
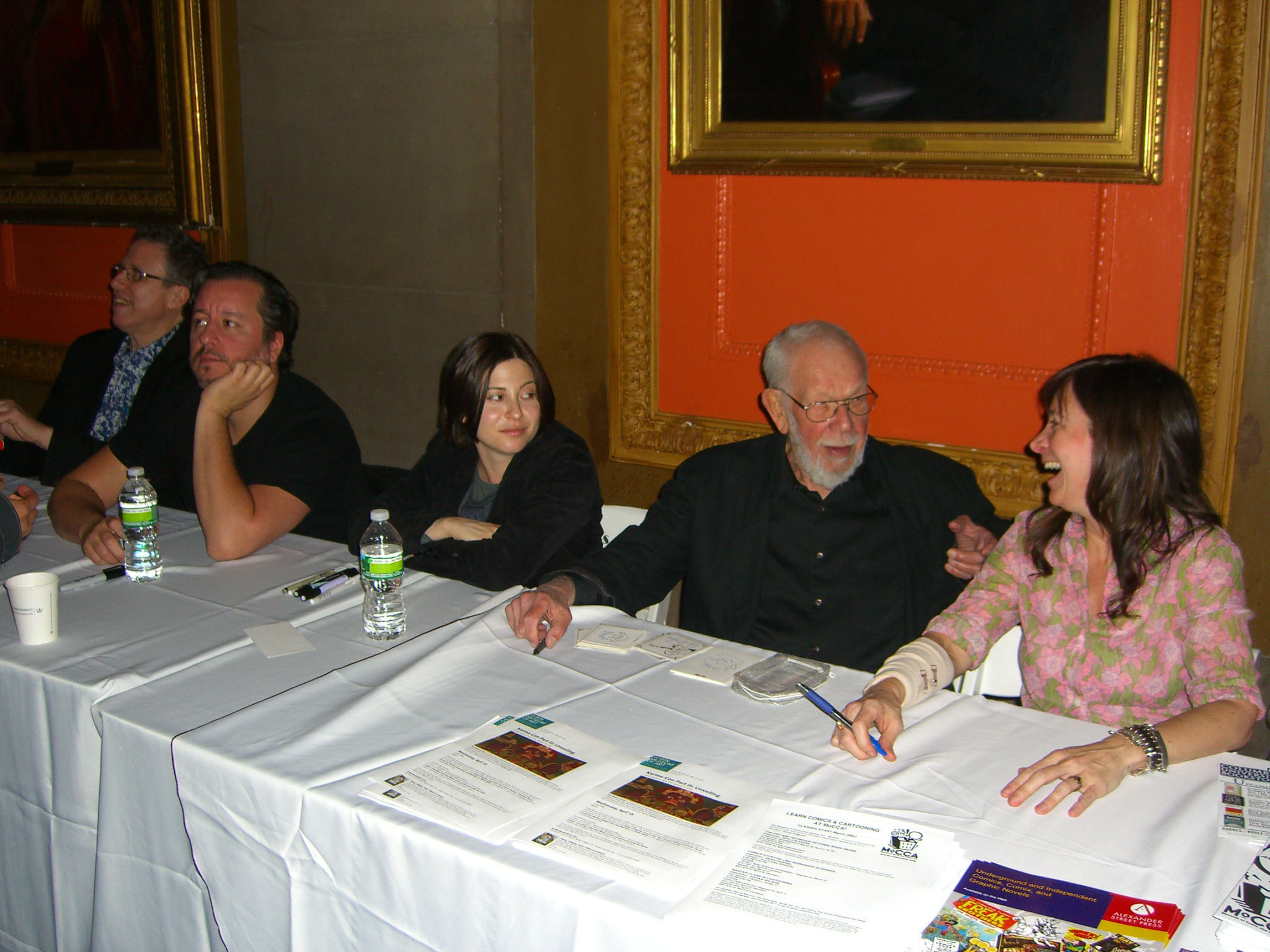
Jaffee at the Comic New York symposium at Columbia University's Low Library on March 24, 2012. Seated from left to right are Danny Fingeroth, Dean Haspiel, Miss Lasko-Gross, Jaffee and Tracy White.

Jaffee won the National Cartoonists Society Advertising and Illustration Award for 1973, its Special Features Award for 1971 and 1975, and its Humor Comic Book Award for 1979. In 2008, he won the Reuben Awards' Cartoonist of the Year.

In 2005, the production company Motion Theory created a video for recording artist Beck's song "Girl" using Jaffee's Mad Fold-Ins as inspiration; Jaffee's name appears briefly in the video, on a television screen.

The March 13, 2006, episode of The Colbert Report aired on Jaffee's 85th birthday, and comedian Stephen Colbert saluted the artist with a Fold-In birthday cake. The cake featured the salutary message "Al, you have repeatedly shown artistry & care of great credit to your field." When the center section of the cake was removed, the remainder read, "Al, you are old."

AL, |                          |
 YOU|  HAVE  REPEATEDLY SHOWN  |
   A|RTISTRY        &        CA|RE
   O|F GREAT CREDIT TO YOUR FIE|LD

That was not Jaffee's first interaction with the comedian. In 2010, he recalled:

I got a call from The Daily Show – they asked me if I would contribute a Fold-In to their book, America. I said I'd be happy to do it. When I was done, I called up the producer who'd contacted me, and I said, "I've finished the Fold-In, where shall I send it?" And he said – and this was a great compliment – "Oh, please Mr. Jaffee, could you deliver it in person? The whole crew wants to meet you." And that's where I met Stephen Colbert and Jon Stewart and all the writers, and they told me it was our work in Mad that inspired them. Not me, particularly, but us, generally ... They said, "Without you guys, we wouldn't be here." And I felt really good about that.

In October 2011, Jaffee was presented with the Sergio Award at a banquet in his honor from the Comic Art Professional Society.

In July 2013, during San Diego Comic-Con, Jaffee was one of six inductees into the Will Eisner Hall of Fame. Jaffee, who worked for Eisner in his studio for one of his earliest jobs, was not present during the convention, and the award was accepted by Mad art director Sam Viviano, who presented it to Jaffee at a later date. The other inductees were Lee Falk, Mort Meskin, Spain Rodriguez, Joe Sinnott, and Trina Robbins. In April 2014, Jaffee was elected to the Society of Illustrators' Hall of Fame.

In October 2013, Columbia University announced that Jaffee had donated most of his archives to the college.

On March 30, 2016, it was officially declared that Jaffee had "the longest career as a comics artist" at "73 years, 3 months" by Guinness World Records. Guinness noted that he had worked continuously, beginning with Jaffee's contribution to the December 1942 issue of Joker Comics and continuing through the April 2016 issue of Mad.

On April 9, 2016, Jaffee received a Life Time Achievement Award, the National Cartoonist Society's Medal of Honor in New York City.

Mary-Lou Weisman, a friend of Jaffee for more than three decades, wrote a profile of him for Provincetown Arts, which she later expanded into the biography, Al Jaffee's Mad Life, published in 2010 by It Books, an imprint of HarperCollins. In addition to reprints of his past work, Jaffee tells his life story to Weisman in an interview style.

== Personal life ==
Jaffee married Ruth Ahlquist in 1945; they had two children, Richard and Debbie. They divorced in 1967. After the divorce, Gaines provided Jaffee with studio space at the Mad offices.

His brother Harry Jaffee (1922–1985), who also had artistic talent, had long been coping with various illnesses—for a time he had been committed to Bellevue Hospital Center. Harry had been living with the Jaffees at the time. After the divorce, Jaffee took two apartments in Manhattan, one for him, and one nearby for Harry. Jaffee also hired him from 1970 to 1977 to do his background detail and lettering. Harry quit upon Jaffee's remarriage.

In 1977, Jaffee married Joyce Revenson, a widow. They lived in Manhattan, summered in Provincetown, Massachusetts, and wintered in Puerto Vallarta, Mexico. Joyce died in January 2020.

Jaffee died of organ failure on April 10, 2023, at a Manhattan hospital. He was 102.

== See also ==
- List of cartoonists
- List of illustrators
