= Arnold Roth =

American cartoonist (born 1929)

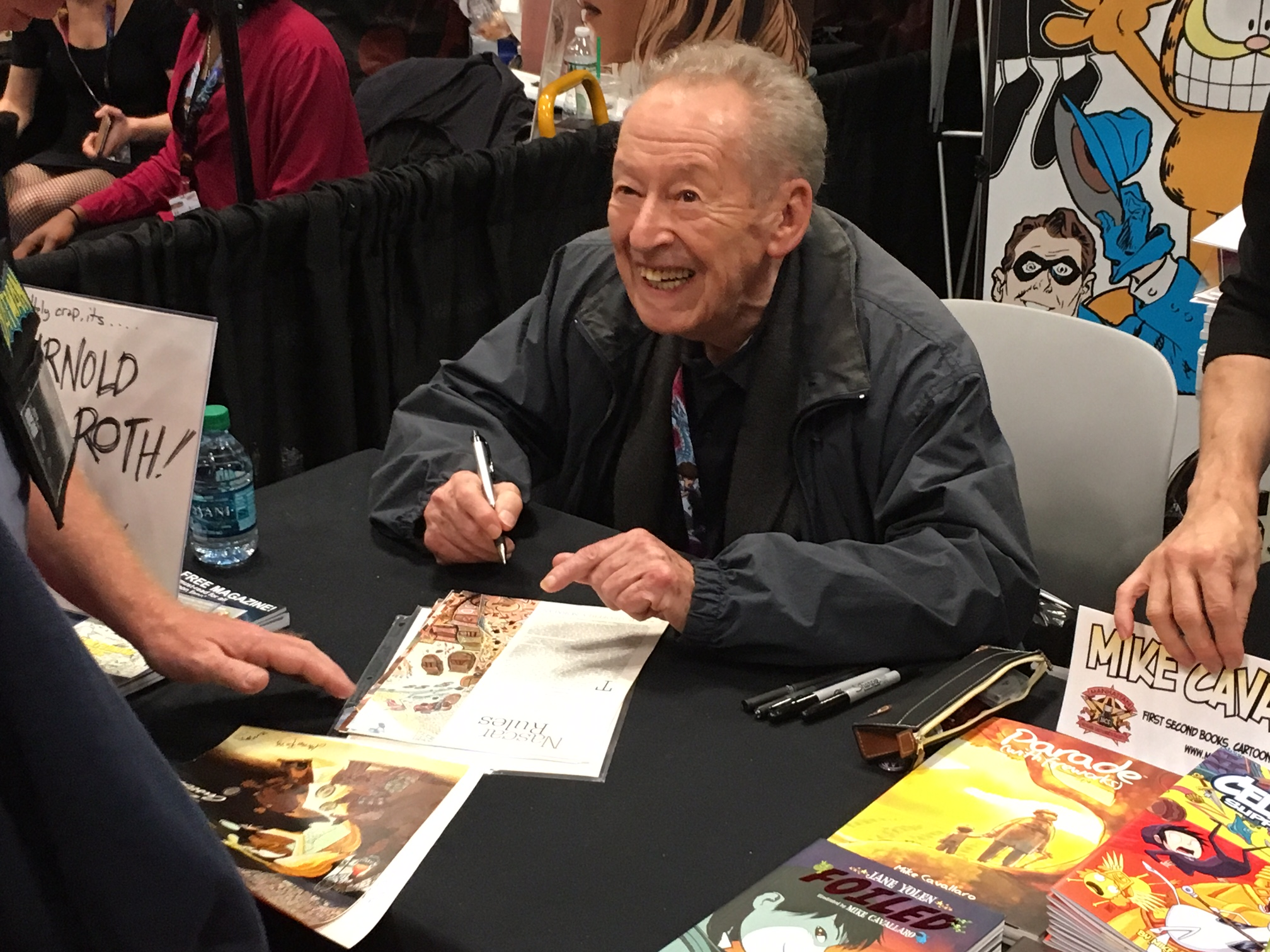
- Roth at the New York Comic Con in 2016
- Born: February 25, 1929 (age 97) Philadelphia, Pennsylvania, US
- Area: Cartoonist
- Notable works: Trump; The New Yorker; TV Guide, Playboy
- Awards: Reuben Award

Arnold Roth (born February 25, 1929) is an American cartoonist and illustrator for advertisements, album covers, books, magazines, and newspapers. Novelist John Updike wrote, "All cartoonists are geniuses, but Arnold Roth is especially so."

== Early life ==
Roth was born in Philadelphia, Pennsylvania on February 25, 1929. His family was Jewish and lived in a predominantly Black working-class neighborhood. Growing up, Roth and his older brother frequently visited the Free Library of Philadelphia and the Philadelphia Museum of Art. He liked jazz music and learned to play the saxophone.

Roth was introduced to drawing when he was seven years old at Graphic Sketch, a philanthropic endeavor that brought in Philadelphia's best artists to teach children art. He also attended art class at museums that were sponsored by the Works Progress Administration.

Roth graduated from Central High School in 1946 and received a full scholarship to the Philadelphia Museum School of Industrial Art. There, he studied illustration. After his first year, he was placed on probation for arriving late to class after nights spent playing in jazz bands; after his second year, he failed his courses and lost his scholarhsip.

Starting in the summer of 1948, Roth worked as a freelance artist. However, he made a living playing in the saxophone and clarinet jazz bands until the mid-1950s. He also worked in factories where he painted toys, lampshades, and decorative pictures.

Roth contracted tuberculosis and went to a sanatorium in Brown Mills, New Jersey for more than a year. When he came home from the sanatorium, he returned to art school. However, he left school for six months to care for his mother, who had cancer. After his mother left him an inheritance of $700, Roth started a freelance business.

== Career ==
=== Magazines ===
Starting in 1951, Rorth began creating cartoons for magazines. In 1952, he made some contributions to TV Guide. In addition to TV Guide, he began regularly contributing to Charm, Holiday, and Glamour. He started selling enough illustrations to make a living as a cartoonist.

Starting in 1957, his cartoons and illustrations were published in the satirical magazines edited by his friend Harvey Kurtzman, including Trump, Humbug, and Help!. He was also a co-editor of Humbug. In the later 1950s, he worked for Playboy. Roth created covers for The New Yorker. His work also appeared in Esquire, Premiere, The Saturday Evening Post, Smithsonian, Sports Illustrated. Roth was a regular contributor of cartoon features to Punch.

Playboy published ten multi-page installments of his An Illustrated History of Sex series in the late 1970s. Roth had multi-page features in almost every one of the first 25 issues of National Lampoon. He was a political cartoonist for The Progressive from 1981 to 1987.

=== Comic strips ===
Roth drew the comic strip Poor Arnold's Almanac as a Sunday strip for the New York Herald Tribune Syndicate from May 1959 to 1961. The comic strip was revived as a daily panel through the Creators Syndicate from 1989 to 1990. Fantagraphics Books published a collection of this strip in 1998.

=== Books ===
Roth wrote and illustrated books for children. He also illustrated book jackets. He designed the jacket for John Updike’s Bech, the Book.

=== Album covers ===
In 1952, Rother met Paul Desmond of the Dave Brubeck Quartet. This relationship led to a sideline of designing record album covers.

== Awards and honors ==
Roth received the National Cartoonists Society Advertising and Illustration Award (1982, 1984, 1985); Illustration Award (1976, 1979, 1981); Magazine and Book Illustration Award (1986, 1987, 1988); Special Feature Award (1979); Sports Cartoon Award (1976, 1977); Reuben Award (1983); and their Gold Key Award (their Hall of Fame) in 2000. He served as the organization's president from 1983 to 1985.

On June 25, 2009, Roth was inducted into the Society of Illustrators Hall of Fame, which honors artists for their “distinguished achievement in the art of illustration.” Past Society presidents select inductees based on their body of work and the impact on the field of illustration. The Society of Illustrators previously recognized Roth with numerous Silver and Gold Stars.

From January 7 to March 2, 2013, the Museum of Comic and Cartoon Art hosted a retrospective exhibit of sixty years of Roth's work.

== Collections ==
Novelist John Updike wrote, "All cartoonists are geniuses, but Arnold Roth is especially so." Roth's art is in the collections of the Philadelphia Museum of Art, the Cartoon Art Museum (San Francisco), Philadelphia's Rosenbach Museum & Library, The Billy Ireland Cartoon Research Library and Museum, the Cartoonmuseum Basel, plus many private collections.

== Personal life ==
Roth married Caroline Wingfield in 1952.

== Selected publications ==
=== Books written and illustrated ===
- Pick A Peck Of Puzzles. W.W. Norton & Company, 1966.
- Arnold Roth's Crazy Book of Science. New York: Grosset & Dunlap, 1971. ISBN 9780448126883
- A Comick Book of Sports. Scribners, 1974. ISBN 9780684138862
- A Comick Book of Pets. New York: Charles Scribner's Sons, 1976. ISBN 9780684147062
- No Pain, No Strain. New York: Saint Martin's Press, 1996. ISBN 9780312147549
- Poor Arnold's Almanac. Fantagraphics Books, 1998. ISBN 978-1560973225

=== Books illustrated ===
- Clifton Fadiman. Wally. The Wordworm. New York: Macmillan, 1964.
- Jane Yolen. The Witch Who Wasn't. New York: Macmillan, 1964. ISBN 9780020457305
- Joseph Rosner. The Hater's Handbook: A Guide to the Wonderful World of Ill Will: The Catcalls, Abuse and Caustic Comment Flung at Persons of Note Throughout the Ages. New York: Delacorte Press, 1965.
- Julius Schwartz. Go on Wheels. New York: McGraw-Hill Book Company, 1966.
- Bill Adler. Kids' Letters to the F.B.I. Prentice Hall, 1966.
- Grimms' Fairy Tales: The Macmillan Classics. New York: Macmillan Co., 1966.
- Jane Yolen. Isabel's Noel. New York: Funk & Wagnalls, 1967.
- Donald Pearce. In the President's and My Opinion... Prentice-Hall, 1967.
- Franklin D. Roosevelt, Rupert Hughes, Samuel Hopkins Adams, et al. The President's Mystery Plot. New York: Prentice Hall, 1967.
- Sam Blum. What Every Good Boy Knew About Sex. New York: Bernard Geis Associates, 1967.

- Richard Bissell. How Many Miles to Galena? Or Baked, Hashed Brown or French Fried? Boston: Little Brown, 1968.
- Hal Higdon. The Horse that Played Centerfield. Holt Rinehart Winston, 1969.
- Norton Juster. Stark Naked: A Paranomastic Odyssey. Random House, 1969.
- John Updike. Bech: A Book. New York: HarperCollins, 1970.
- Brock Brower. The Inchworm and the Butterfly Peace. New York: Doubleday & Co., 1970.
- Ralph Schoenstein. Little Spiro: His Letters, Poems, Essays, Songs and Drawings. New York: William Morrow, 1971.
- Ralph Schoenstein. I Hear America Mating: A Hilarious Trek Through the Wilds of Modern Sex. New York: St. Martin's Press,1972. ASIN B0006D0FBU
- Ralph Schoenstein. East Vs. West. Simon & Schuster, 1981. ISBN 9780671430474
- John Updike. Bech is Back. New York: Alfred A. Knopf, 1982. ASIN B000JWDJH0
- George Plimpton. A Sports Bestiary. New York: McGraw-Hill, 1982. ISBN 978-0070502901
- W. P. Kinsella. The Further Adventures of Slugger McBatt. Toronto: Collins, 1988. ISBN 9780395475935
- B. L. Andrews. Diggin' Your Own Grave: Over 350 Foolproof Ways to Totally Screw Up Your Life. St. Martin's Press, 1994. ISBN 9780312953584
- John Updike. Bech at Bay. New York: Alfred A. Knopf, NY, 1998. ISBN 9780375403682
- William F. Buckley Jr. The Lexicon: A Cornucopia of Wonderful Words for the Inquisitive Word Lover. Harvest/HBJ Book, 1998. ISBN 978-0156006163
- John Updike. A Sound Heard Early on the Morning of Christ's Nativity. Northridge: Lord John Press, 2002.
- John Updike. Flying to Florida. Northridge: Lord John Press, 2003

=== Album covers ===
Roth created cover art for jazz and folk albums:

- Dave Brubeck Quartet – Jazz at the College of the Pacific (1953)
- Dave Brubeck Quartet – Jazz at the College of the Pacific Vol.2 (1953)
- Dave Brubeck Octet – Old Sounds from San Francisco (1955)
- Phil Napoleon – Phil Napoleon and His Memphis Five (1955)
- Woody Herman and His Orchestra – Ridin' Herd (1955)
- Dutch Swing College Band – Dixieland Goes Dutch (1955)
- Dave Brubeck Octet – Dave Brubeck Octet (1956)
- Dave Bruebeck Trio – Dave Brubeck Trio (1956)
- Art Van Damme – The Art of Van Damme (1956)
- The Jay and Kai Trombone Octet – Jay & Kai + 6 (1956)
- Dave Brubeck – Plays and Plays and Plays (1957)
- Boyd Raeburn and His Orchestra – Fraternity Rush (1957)
- Dave Brubeck Quartet – Jazz Impressions of the U.S.A. (1957)
- Cal Tjader – Latin Kick (1958)
- Frank De Vol and His Orchestra – Portraits (1958)
- Dave Brubeck Quartet – The Dave Brubeck Quartet in Europe (1958)
- Dave Brubeck, Paul Desmond, and David Van Kriedt – Reunion (1958)
- The San Francisco Marching, Walking, and Trotting Band – The Good Old Days (1958)
- The Famous Castle Jazz Band – The Famous Castle Jazz Band In Stereo (1958)
- Louis Prima – Breaking it Up! Louis Prima with Keely Smith (1958)
- Les Strand – Les Strand Plays Duke Ellington (on the Hammond Organ) (1958)
- The San Francisco Marching, Walking, and Trotting Band – Concert in the Park (1959)
- The San Francisco Marching, Walking, and Trotting Band – The Spirit of the 20's (1959)
- Domenico Savino and His Symphonic Strings – Classical Music for Pop Music Fans (1960)
- Dave Brubeck Quartet – Near-Myth / Bruebeck-Smith (1962)
- Pete Seeger – Pete Seeger Sings Little Boxes and Other Broadsides (1963)
