= Humbug (magazine) =

Humor magazine

- Cover illustration by Jack Davis for Humbug #2 (September 1957)
- Editor: Harvey Kurtzman
- Categories: Satirical magazine
- Frequency: Monthly
- Publisher: Humbug, Inc.
- First issue: August 1957
- Final issue: 1958
- Country: United States
- Language: English

In the first issue of Humbug (August 1957), Jack Davis illustrated Harvey Kurtzman's parody of Elia Kazan's film of Tennessee Williams' Baby Doll (1956). Here is a page from "Doll-Baby" with Davis' caricatures of Karl Malden, Carroll Baker and Eli Wallach. The similarity to an animation walking cycle prompts appearances by animated cartoon characters—Goofy, Farmer Al Falfa and Felix the Cat.

Humbug is a humor magazine published from 1957 to 1958. Edited by Harvey Kurtzman, the magazine took satirical jabs at movies, television, advertising and various artifacts of popular culture, from cereal boxes to fashion photographs. Nine of the eleven issues were published in a black-and-white comic book-sized format.

With fatally accurate irony, Kurtzman delivered his declaration of editorial principles in the first issue:

"We won't write for morons. We won't do anything just to get laughs. We won't be dirty. We won't be grotesque. We won't be in bad taste. We won't sell magazines."

Several of the project's contributing artists had previously worked with Kurtzman when he was the editor of Mad, including Wallace Wood, Jack Davis, Al Jaffee and Will Elder. The 32-page first issue (August 1957) featured a front cover by Elder (with the announcement "The End of the World Is Coming" inside a border design depicting contemporary life). Interior artwork was by Elder, Kurtzman, Wood, Davis, Jaffee and Arnold Roth. Outside writer contributions included a piece by the novelist and screenwriter Ira Wallach. Elder illustrated Kurtzman's satire of television's rigged Twenty One quiz show, and Davis spoofed the Elia Kazan film of Tennessee Williams' Baby Doll (1956). The second issue expanded from 32 pages to 48 pages.

Later issues included text pieces by Larry Siegel, who would soon move on to a 32-year stint with Mad. Al Jaffee returned to Mad in the same issue as Siegel's debut, and remained with the magazine for more than half a century until he retired at age 99. Wally Wood was the only artist to work simultaneously for Mad and Kurtzman's post-Mad projects; after Humbug folded, Wood was a Mad regular until 1964. It took Jack Davis seven years to return to Mad; the artist's second run at Mad lasted from 1965 to 1996.

== Overview ==
Humbug was made up of humorous, satirical comics and prose pieces. It was published in a comic book format in black-and-white with a second color, and sold for 15 cents at a time when most comic books were in full color for 10 cents.

In comparison to Mad or Trump, Humbug was more political, and had more of the feel of a college humor magazine.

== History ==
...we all somehow talked ourselves into a very foolish thing, which was an artists' magazine...All of us chipped in money, and we went into the publishing business, which artists should never, never do, for the simple reason that they lose sight of the practical considerations of business survival. Art becomes everything and the marketplace becomes secondary.

--Kurtzman, in interview

After the cancellation of Trump, a heartbroken Harvey Kurtzman set his sights on a new humor magazine project. Humbug, Inc., was started with $6,500 pooled together from the pockets of Kurtzman, Arnold Roth, Al Jaffee, Will Elder and Harry Chester. (Note: The pool broke down as follows: $2,500 from Roth; $1,500 from Jaffee; $1,000 from Elder; $1,000 from Kurtzman; $500 from Chester) Though the partners contributed different levels of capital, they were all given equal weight in the company. Even so, it was clear that Kurtzman led the operation.

Jack Davis, a regular contributor to Mad and Trump, was also a major contributor to Humbug, but decided not to become a financial partner. He continued to draw a paycheck for his work as the founders found themselves deeper in the red.

== Size matters ==
Although Humbug offered the same type of superior satires Kurtzman had previously presented in Mad and Trump, the small size was a genuine problem. It sometimes was the smallest publication in magazine racks, with the result that it was often hidden behind larger magazines. Despite a change to a larger magazine format with the tenth issue, it ceased publication with issue #11. Many contributors to Humbug were also the project's financial supporters, but their investments were lost when the magazine folded because of poor distribution. Kurtzman closed up shop with the following editorial in the magazine's last issue:

Man—We're Beat! Satire has got us beat. 1953—We started Mad magazine for a comic-book publisher and we did some pretty good satire and it sold very well. 1956—We started Trump magazine ... and we worked much harder and we did much better satire and we sold much worse. 1957—We started Humbug magazine and we worked hardest of all and turned out the very best satire of all, which of course now sells the very worst of all. And now ... as they throw rocks at Vice President Nixon ... as space gets cluttered with missiles ... and as our names are carefully removed from our work in Mad pocketbooks—a feeling of beatness creeps through our satirical veins and capillaries and we think how George S. Kaufman once said, "Satire is something that closes Saturday night."

== Publication history ==
Issues of Humbug
No.	Year	Month	Note
1	1957	August	
2	1957	September	
3	1957	October	
4	1957	November	
5	1957	December	
6	1958	January	
7	1958	February	
8	1958	April	
9	1958	May	
10	1958	June	Switch to magazine format
11	1958	October	expanded from 32 to 48 pages

Some material from the magazine was collected in the paperback, The Humbug Digest (Ballantine Books).

A complete Humbug collection of all 11 issues was reprinted February 2008 in a two-volume slipcased edition by Fantagraphics Books. It includes annotations by John Benson, a lengthy 2005 interview with Arnold Roth and Al Jaffee, plus a four-page explanation of exactly how restoration of the magazine was accomplished by Fantagraphics.

== Reception and legacy ==
Hugh Hefner, who had published Trump, provided "those strange ones" at Humbug a nine-page feature in Playboy's December 1957 issue.

Underground cartoonist Robert Crumb said that the elaborate Davis–Elder cover to the second issue of Humbug "changed his life". In 1958 Crumb and his brother Charles self-published three issues of Foo in imitation of Humbug and Mad. Crumb paid homage to Humbug's detailed cover borders on every cover of his magazine Weirdo from the 1980s.

To Diana Green, the humor in Humbug suffered from a topicality "inherent in satire" that lost its bite when read out of its own time and context.
