= Trump (magazine) =

American magazine published in 1957

Trump was a glossy magazine of satire and humor, mostly in the forms of comics features and short stories. It was edited by Harvey Kurtzman and published by Hugh Hefner, with only two issues produced in 1957. The first issue appeared in January 1957 and the second came out in March. The magazine's mascot was a trumpeter herald in the style of John Tenniel's Alice in Wonderland illustrations. Kurtzman began work on Trump shortly after leaving Mad following a break with its publisher William M. Gaines. Mad also lost two of its top cartoonists in the dispute's aftermath, when Will Elder and Jack Davis chose to follow Kurtzman. Wally Wood was also recruited for the Trump team in the form of an either-or option, but he chose to stay at Mad. Other notable artists, including Al Jaffee and Arnold Roth, appeared in Trump.

== Production ==
Sales were reportedly good for Trump, especially for a new title with a 50-cent cover price, then considered high. But the project was ill-fated. The magazine featured glossy (and costly) production standards and had the misfortune of debuting at the same time that a financial crunch forced publisher Hefner to scale back his non-Playboy publishing interests. This put an end to Trump before the magazine ever got the chance to develop a steady readership.

Speaking about the magazine's short run later, Hefner said, "I gave Harvey an unlimited budget, and he exceeded it."

== Aftermath ==
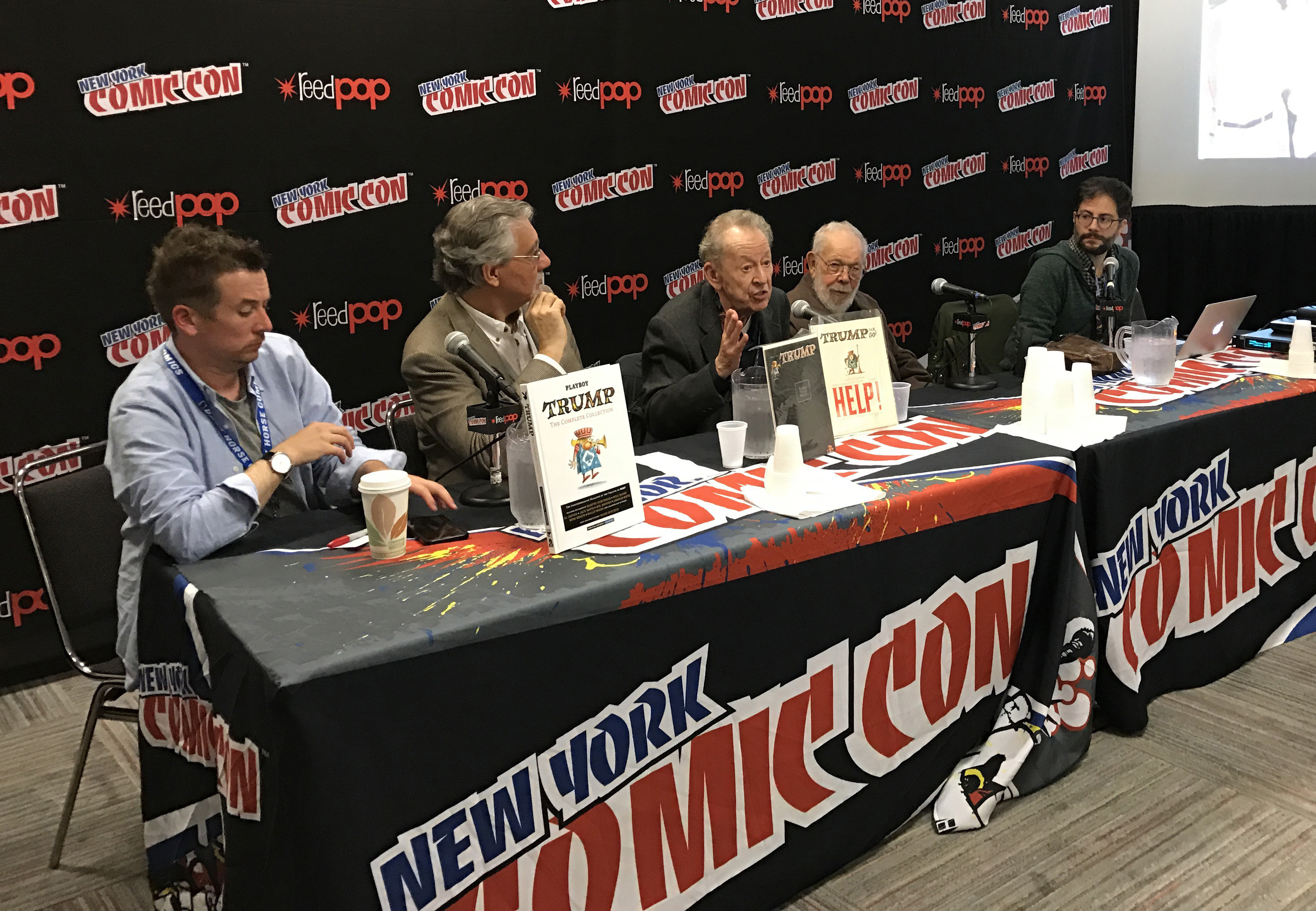
Panel dedicated to Trump at the 2016 New York Comic Con. From left to right: John Lind, Denis Kitchen, Arnold Roth, Al Jaffee and moderator Bill Kartapoulos.

Kurtzman spearheaded additional humorous publications such as Humbug and Help!. Kurtzman and Elder continued to work at Playboy for another three decades, chiefly producing Little Annie Fanny, which made use of copious sight gags. Jack Davis became a top freelancer for advertising agencies and various magazines, including a return to Mad in 1965.
