= Nicholas Blechman =

American illustrator

Nicholas Blechman is an American creative director, illustrator and graphic designer. He is best known for his work as the creative director of The New Yorker since 2015, and as the art director of The New York Times Book Review between 2006–2015. Blechman's illustrations are distinctive for their minimal line style and use of simple geometric shapes.

== Career ==
In 2015, Blechman became the creative director of The New Yorker magazine. Previously, he worked as the art director of the weekly The New York Times Book Review and The New York Times op-ed pages.

His illustrations have appeared on the pages of The New Yorker, Travel + Leisure, GQ, Wired and The New York Times and were exhibited at the Metropolitan Museum of Art.

Blechman has been awarded the Richard Gangel Art Director Award, the 2013 Cynthia Hazen Polsky and Leon Polsky Rome Prize in Design and completed the Rome Prize residency at the American Academy in Rome.

He has published, edited, and designed the political underground magazine NOZONE.

He is the son of cartoonist R.O. Blechman.

== Works ==
- Night Light - Orchard Books, 2013
- Chip Kidd, Christoph Niemann -100% Evil - Princeton Architectural Press

== See also ==
- Christoph Niemann
