= Les Strand =

American jazz organist (1925–2002)

Les Strand (born Leslie Strandt 1925-2002) was an American jazz organist. He was considered a pioneer, Jimmy Smith referred to him as "the Art Tatum of the organ".

== Recordings ==
- Les Strand at the Baldwin Organ (Fantasy, 1956)
- Plays Jazz Classics on the Baldwin Organ (Fantasy, 1956)
- Plays Duke Ellington (On the Hammond Organ) (Fantasy, 1958)
- The Winners: Les Strand & the Yamaha with Their Friends, Barney Kessel & Shelly Manne (Yamaha, 196?)
