= TRIAD Berlin =

German design company

TRIAD Berlin Projektgesellschaft mbH
- Type: GmbH
- Industry: Design
- Founded: 1994
- Founder: Lutz Engelke
- Headquarters: Berlin, Germany
- Number of employees: about 180 (2016)
- Website: www.triad.de

TRIAD Berlin was a German exhibition design firm based in Berlin with an office in Shanghai. The agency is best known for the development of two major sports museums: the German Football Museum in Dortmund and the FIFA World Football Museum in Zürich.

== History ==
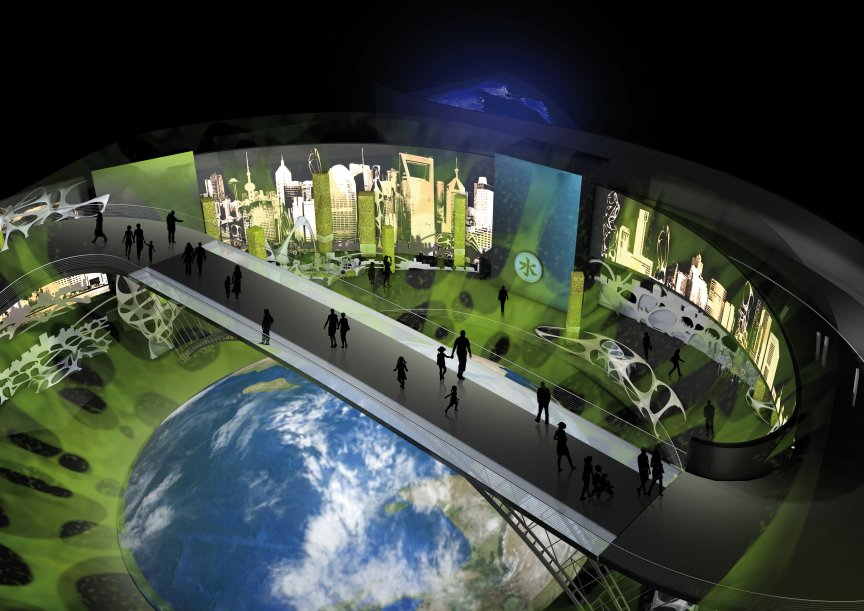
Urban Planet pavilion, Expo 2010 Shanghai

The Berlin agency was founded in 1994 by Lutz Engelke to realize the exhibition The Dream of Vision – Age of Televisions at Gasometer Oberhausen in the city of Oberhausen. After designing the theme pavilion Urban Planet at Expo 2010, the company also established an additional permanent office in Shanghai, China. At the beginning of 2020 the agency filed for insolvency. Since then a TRIAD network has been operating with several companies.

== Exhibition Design Approach ==
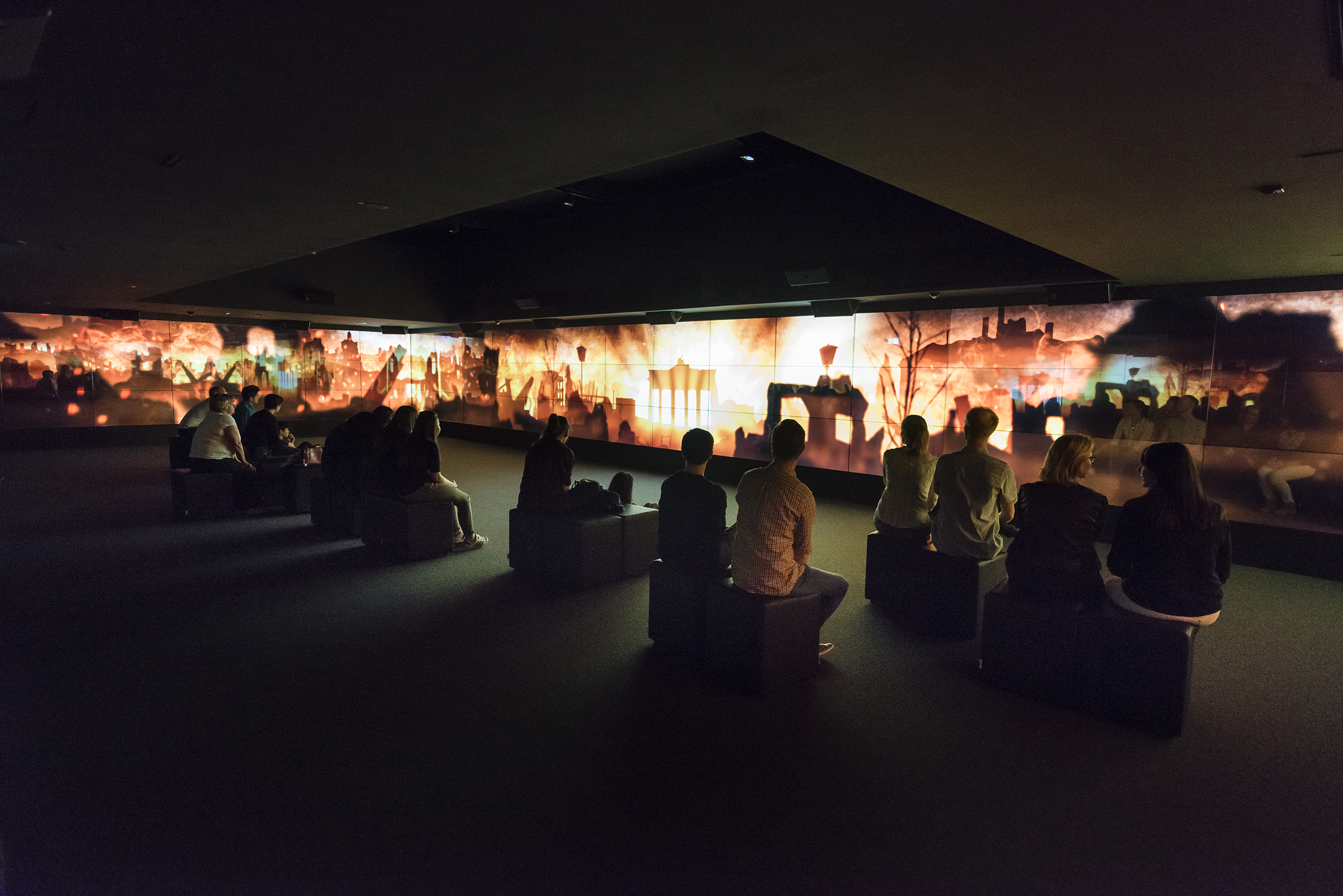
Brandenburg Gate Museum, Berlin

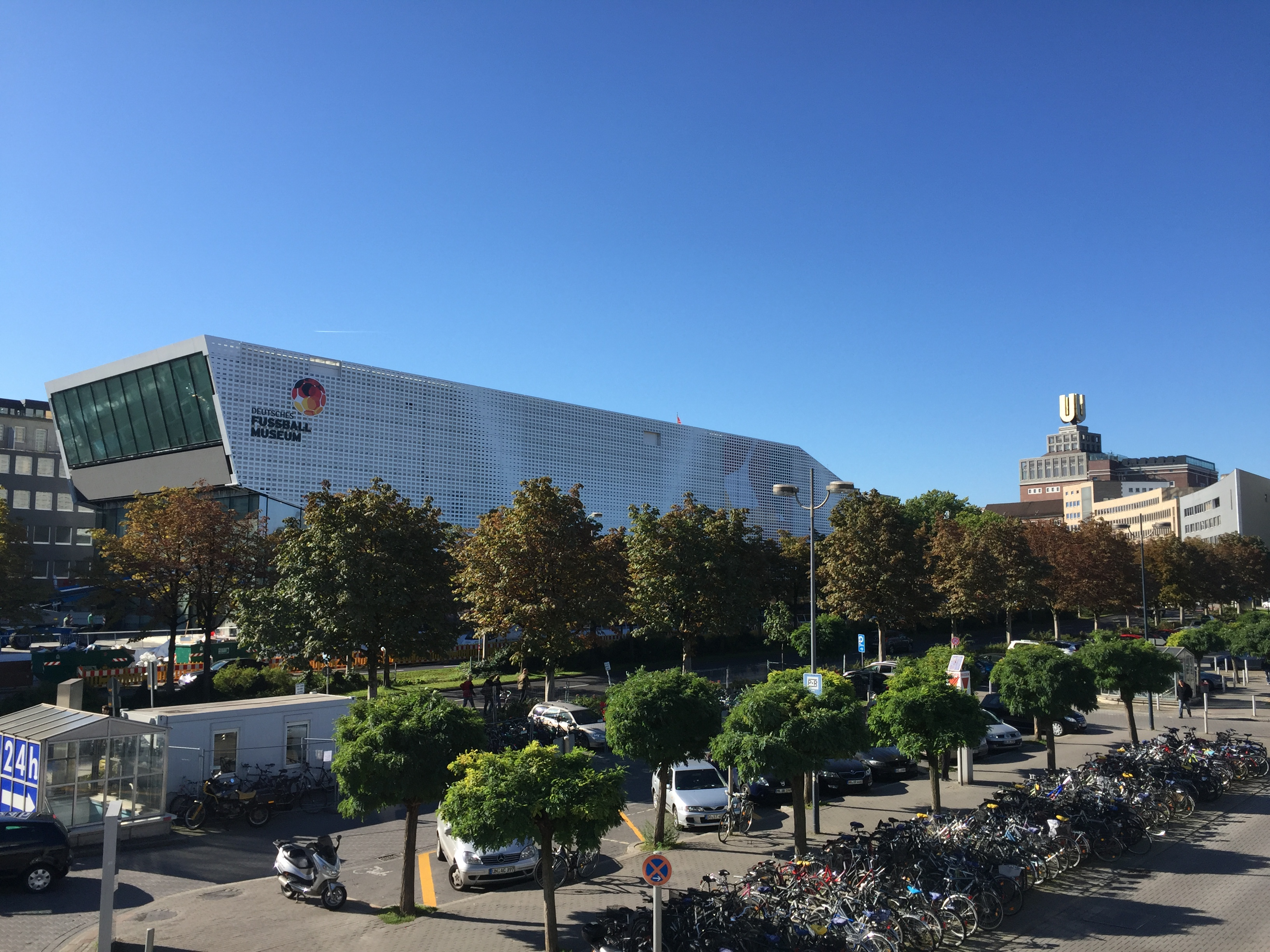
German Football Museum, Dortmund

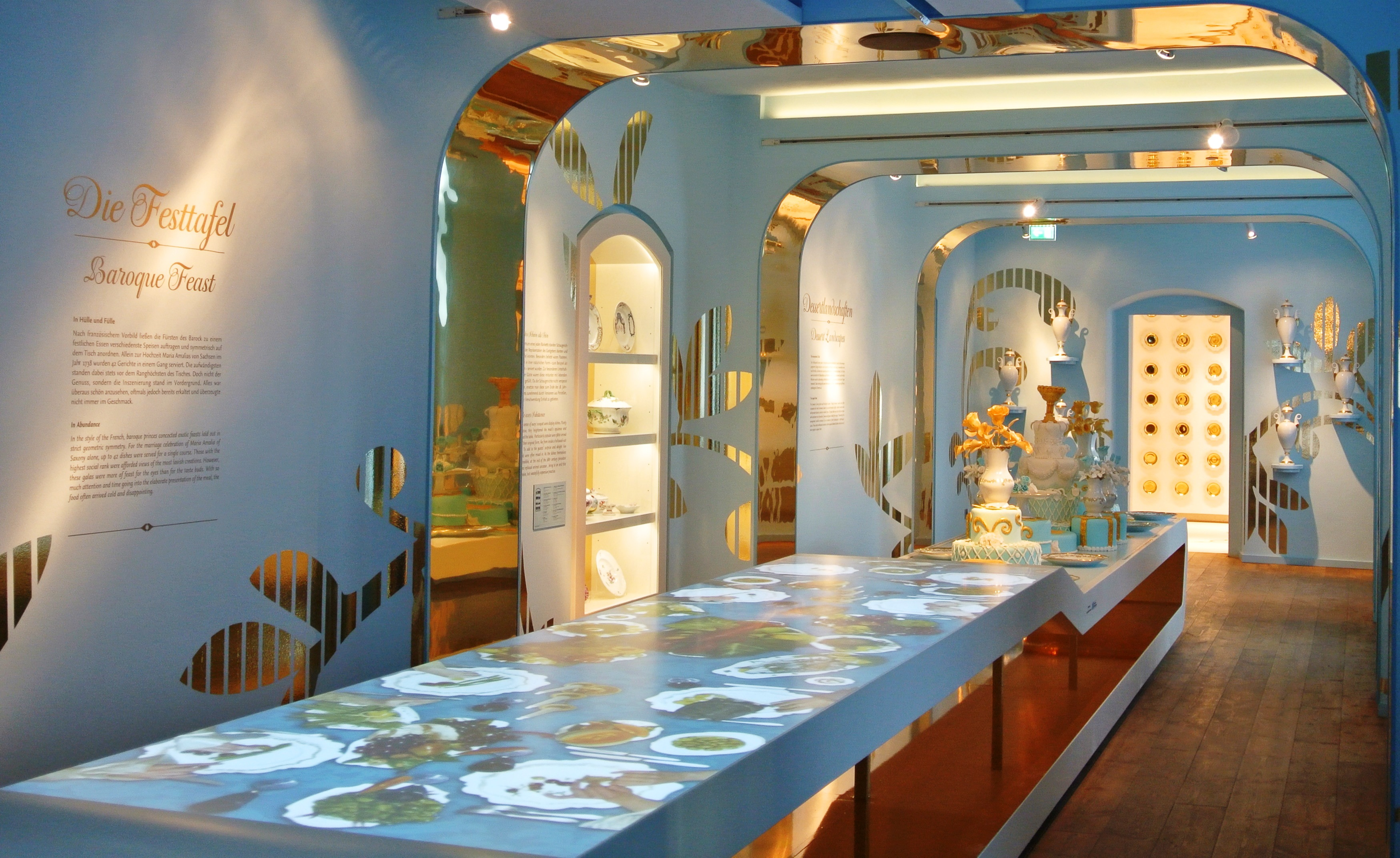
Museum Leuchtenburg, Seitenroda

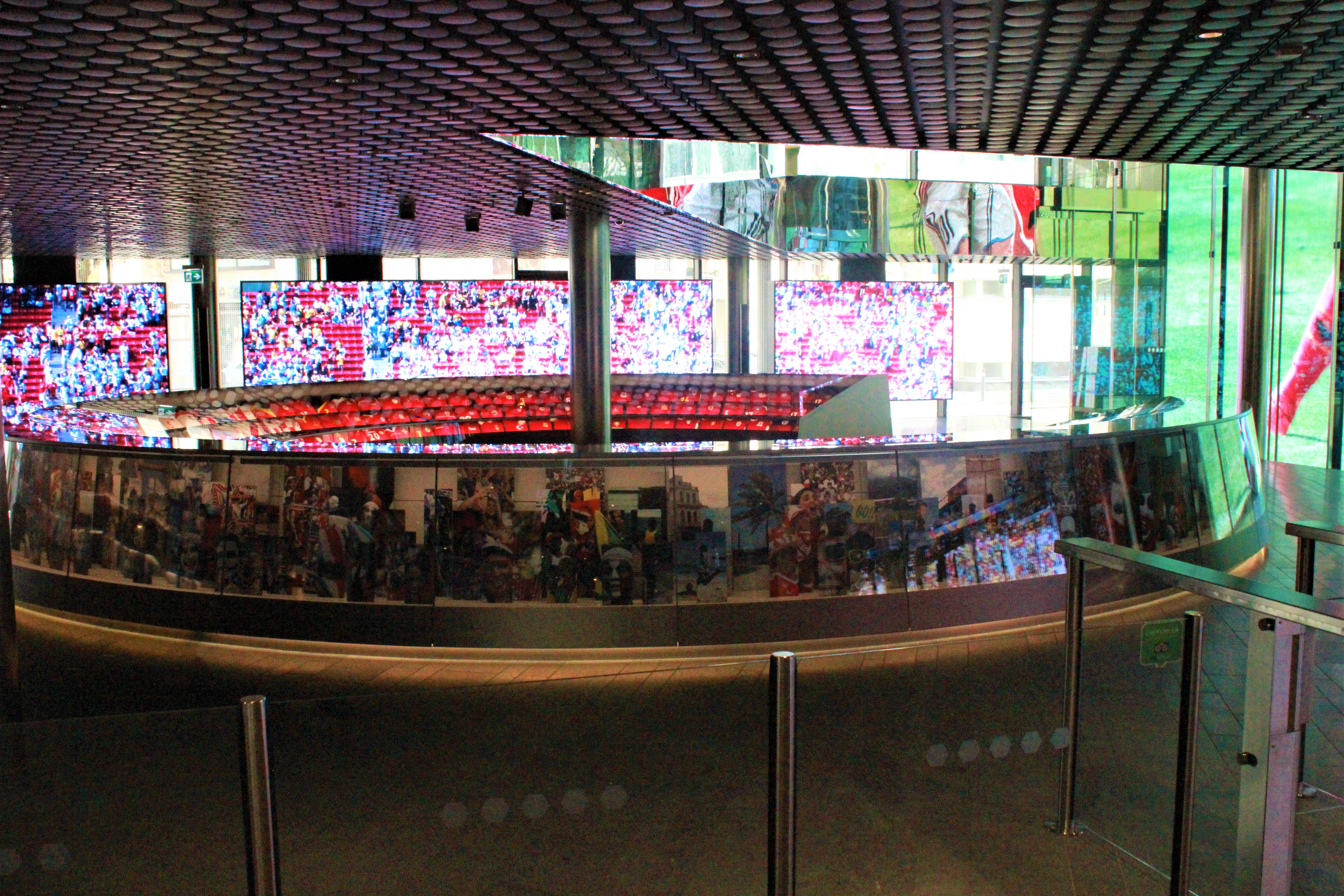
FIFA World Football Museum, Zürich

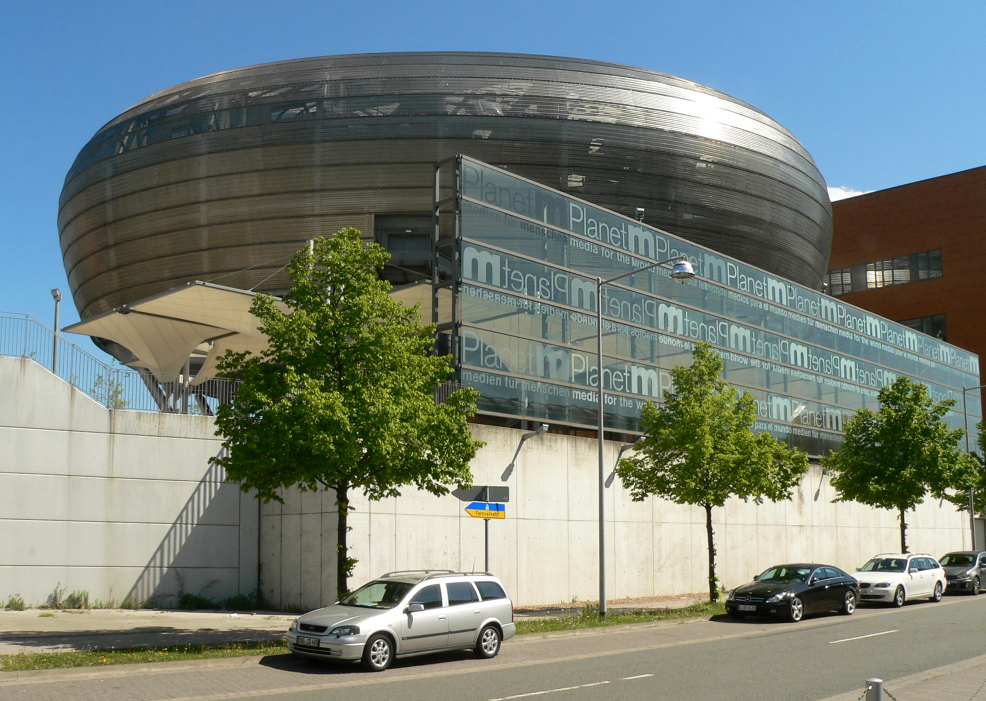
Planet m pavilion, Expo 2000 Hanover

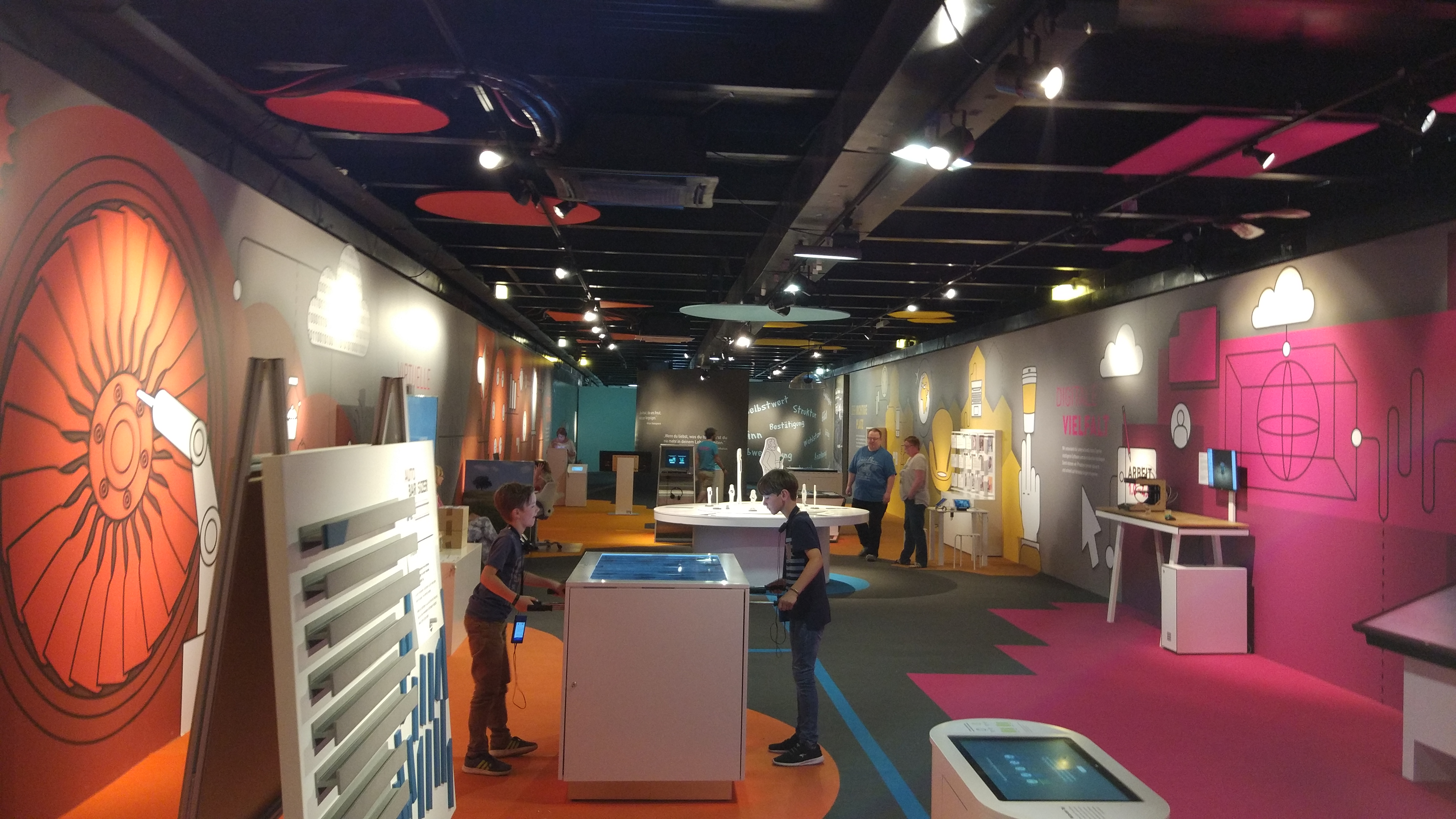
Exhibition Working life of the future on MS Wissenschaft

The agency focuses on spatial communication and sees itself as a Think & Do Tank. Its main goal is to turn complex ideas into tangible experiences. Although the content of the projects varies, the method used for their development is always the same: the creation of stories that can be experienced from abstract ideas. A key component of this process is the development of a narrative that structures the messages and guides the visitor through the exhibition. Most of the times, the storytelling is enhanced by digital media. TRIAD exhibitions rely heavily on digital interactive exhibits with the intention of bridging the gap between the intellectual learning process and the physical experience. In many cases, TRIAD combines education and entertainment in a multimedia space. The result is the so-called edutainment, whose goal is to educate through entertainment.

TRIAD has applied edutainment concepts to various projects focused on children's education, such as the 2018 exhibition on the MS Wissenschaft about working life of the future. In the same way, the company has used this approach in the Brandenburg Gate Museum in Berlin.

The company is also tackling other challenges that exhibitions face today, like the creation of barrier-free museums. An example of this is the exhibition Wilderness Dreams in Eifel National Park which is part of the United Nations Decade on Biodiversity.

== Notable projects ==
The agency designs exhibitions, museums, experience centers, trade fairs, expo pavilions, edutainment concepts, brand environments and events. A lot of the company's projects focus on three main areas: sustainability, sports, and culture.

- Exhibition The Dream of Vision – Age of Televisions, Gasometer Oberhausen, 1997
- Pavilion Planet m, Hanover, Germany, Expo 2000
- Theme pavilion Urban Planet, Shanghai, China, Expo 2010
- Visitor center Qinhu Wetland National Park, Jiangsu, China 2011
- Conference Creating Climate Wealth Summit, Siemens-Villa Wannsee, Germany 2012
- Museum Porcelain Worlds, Leuchtenburg, Thuringia, Germany 2014
- German Football Museum, Dortmund, Germany 2015
- Showroom Hanergy Renewable Energy Exhibition Center, Beijing, China 2015
- FIFA World Football Museum, Zürich, Switzerland 2016
- Brandenburg Gate Museum, Berlin, Germany 2016
- Exhibition Wilderness Dreams, Eifel National Park, Germany 2016
- Visitor center 360 Degrees – Thuringia Goes Digital, Erfurt, Germany 2017
- Event 100 Years UFA Anniversary Night, Berlin, Germany 2017
- Exhibition ALL IN ALL. Jacob Böhme, Dresden State Art Collections, Germany 2017
- Conference Astana Expo 2017 Future Energy Forum, Expo Astana, Kazakhstan 2017
- Exhibition Working life of the future on MS Wissenschaft, currently visiting 34 cities in Germany, Austria and Switzerland

== Literature ==
- Engelke, Lutz/Osswald, Anja: Die Metamedienmaschine. Kommunikation im digitalen Zeitalter. In Hildebrandt, Alexandra/Landhäußer, Werner (eds.). CSR und Digitalisierung. Der digitale Wandel als Chance und Herausforderung für Wirtschaft und Gesellschaft. Berlin: Springer-Verlag, 2017, p. 961–973. ISBN 978-3662532010.
- Engelke, Lutz/Osswald, Anja: „Weltregal“ or the World on a Shelf. In Grau, Oliver et al. (eds.). Museum and Archive on the Move. Changing Cultural Institutions in the Digital Era. Berlin/Boston: De Gruyter, 2017, p. 277–284. ISBN 978-3-11-052963-0.
- Engelke, Lutz: Zur Ökologie von Kreativität, Innovation und Organisation – ein Reisebericht. In Roehl, Heiko/Asselmeyer, Herbert (eds.). Organisationen klug gestalten. Das Handbuch für Organisationsentwicklung und Change Management. Stuttgart: Schäffer-Poeschel, 2017, p. 157–164. ISBN 978-3-7910-3677-9.
- Engelke, Lutz: Globalization and transformation. What can design accomplish in the 21st century? In Eysoldt, Robert/Ruddigkeit, Raban (eds.). Berlin Design Digest Berlin. 100 successful projects, products, and processes Berlin: Slanted Publishers, 2017, p. 242–247. ISBN 978-3-9818296-0-0.
- Engelke, Lutz: Die Dauerausstellung. Eine Reise in die Tiefe des Raums. In Neukirchner, Manuel (ed.): Mehr als ein Spiel. Das Buch zum Deutschen Fußballmuseum. Essen: Klartext, 2015, p. 54–85. ISBN 978-3-8375-0973-1.
- Figueres, José Maria: Zukunft entscheidet sich in Deutschland. Ein Land auf dem ökologischen Vormarsch. In Bachmann, Günther/Engelke, Lutz (eds.). future lab germany. innovationen für die welt von morgen. Hamburg: Murmann, 2013. p. 189–193. ISBN 978-3867742702.
- Wong, Liliane: Sustainability: Industry Standards and Innovation. In Leydecker, Sylvia (ed.): Designing Interior Architecture. Concept Typology Material Construction. Basel: Birkhäuser, 2013, p. 66–97. ISBN 978-3-0346-1580-8.
- Ang, Ien: On Display. The State of the World. In Winter, Tim: Shanghai Expo. An International Forum on the Future of Cities. London/New York: Routledge, 2013, p. 101–119. ISBN 978-0-415-52462-9.
- Rat für Nachhaltige Entwicklung/TRIAD Berlin (eds.): Visionen 2050. Dialoge Zukunft „Made in Germany“. Texte Nr. 25, Jan. 2011. online
- Schaade, Christian/Deutsches Zollmuseum Hamburg (ed.): Deutsches Zollmuseum. Ein Ausstellungsrundgang. Hamburg: Deutsches Zollmuseum, 2008. ISBN 978-3554668698.
- Grau, Oliver: Virtual Art: From Illusion to Immersion. Cambridge (Mass.)/London: MIT Press, 2003. ISBN 0-262-07241-6.
- Kubitz, Peter Paul/Hoenisch, Peter/TRIAD Berlin (eds.): Der Traum vom Sehen. Zeitalter der Televisionen. Amsterdam/Dresden: Verlag der Kunst, 1997. ISBN 90-5705-054-4.
