= Christoff Zalpour =

German physician (born 1963)

- Christoff Zalpour, 2026
- Born: 1963 (age 62–63)
- Education: University of Giessen; University of Münster; Stanford University
- Known for: Physiotherapy for performing artists; playing-related musculoskeletal disorders in musicians
- Scientific career
- Fields: Physiotherapy; Musicians' medicine
- Workplaces: Osnabrück University of Applied Sciences (2003–present); Universidad de Ciencias Médicas de La Habana (visiting professor, 2024–present)
- Academic advisors: John P. Cooke (Stanford)

Christoff Zalpour (born 1963) is a German physician and academic. Since 2003 he has been professor of physiotherapy at Osnabrück University of Applied Sciences in Lower Saxony, Germany, where he directs the Institute of Applied Physiotherapy (INAP/O). Since 2024 he has also held a visiting professorship at the Universidad de Ciencias Médicas de La Habana in Cuba. His research concerns the health of musicians and other performing artists, and he is the editor of several German reference works and textbooks on physiotherapy.

== Career ==
Zalpour was born in 1963. He studied medicine and education at the University of Giessen, the University of Münster and Stanford University. At Stanford's Center of Cardiovascular Research he worked in the group of John P. Cooke on the role of L-arginine and nitric oxide in vascular function, co-authoring papers in the Journal of the American College of Cardiology and Arteriosclerosis, Thrombosis, and Vascular Biology. In Germany he practised as a physician in occupational medicine, rehabilitation medicine and internal medicine, and taught in allied health education.

He was appointed to the chair of physiotherapy at Osnabrück in 2003, founding the SCIPOS research group in 2005 and the INAP/O in 2007. At the institute he established a physiotherapy clinic for musicians in cooperation with the university's Institute of Music, one of the first such services at a German university. He went on to initiate the MotionLab movement analysis facility in 2014 and has headed the university's PhysioLabs since 2019.

== Research ==
Zalpour's principal research concerns playing-related musculoskeletal disorders in musicians, with the aim of establishing physiotherapy for performing artists as a distinct subdiscipline analogous to sports physiotherapy. In 2021 he published, with Nikolaus Ballenberger and Florian Avermann, an analysis of data from 614 patients treated at the Osnabrück clinic for musicians, one of the larger clinical datasets in the field. Related work has addressed the reliability of movement analysis in string players and the validation of German-language assessment instruments for musicians' pain.

In 2020 the Federal Ministry of Education and Research awarded around €1 million to RefLabPerform, a project he co-directs that combines physiotherapeutic assessment with instrumented movement analysis for performing artists.

In December 2023 the German Research Foundation (DFG) selected PA.H|LIFETIME.ai, for which Zalpour is spokesperson, as one of the first ten Research Impulse (Forschungsimpuls) consortia at German universities of applied sciences, chosen from 69 reviewed applications and funded from April 2024 for an initial five years within a programme totalling €49 million. The project applies artificial intelligence to pooled health data in order to identify risk factors and build predictive models for playing-related complaints, and involves the Hanover University of Music, Drama and Media as well as international partners in Australia. Its stated structural aims include establishing a centre of excellence and what would be the first professorship worldwide in performing arts physiotherapy.

The project and the associated movement laboratory were the subject of television and radio reporting by ARD and NDR in 2026, in which a guitarist's playing-related complaints were followed from clinical assessment through three-dimensional motion capture. The project was also selected for presentation aboard the exhibition ship MS Wissenschaft during the German Science Year on the future of medicine.

A second strand of Zalpour's work concerns direct access to physiotherapy and professional autonomy in the German health professions, on which he has published surveys and review articles.

== Work in Cuba ==
Zalpour first spoke in Havana in 2016, at the first international congress on illness and rehabilitation among arts professionals (SaludarteHabana 2016). From 2021 to 2024 he led the German side of CubOsMT, a German–Cuban university project on manual therapy carried out with the Universidad de Ciencias Médicas de La Habana and funded by the German Academic Exchange Service. At the closing congress in Havana in October 2024 the Cuban university granted him a visiting professorship carrying teaching rights and the right to supervise doctoral candidates; with his colleague Dirk Möller he was also the first non-Cuban appointed to the university's national commission for the degree programme in health rehabilitation. In 2025 he presented at the sixth international congress "Tecnología y Salud" of the Faculty of Health Technology in Havana.

== Editorial and professional roles ==
Zalpour edited the Springer Lexikon Physiotherapie, a two-volume German reference work covering some 22,000 entries, and has edited the textbook Anatomie Physiologie für die Physiotherapie through five editions since 2002. He has served on the board of the German Society for Music Physiology and Musicians' Medicine since 2017 and on the board of the European Network of Physiotherapy in Higher Education, and is a member of the New York Academy of Sciences and of the scientific advisory boards of the journals pt_Zeitschrift für Physiotherapie, physioscience and Physiotherapie.

== Selected works ==
- Anatomie Physiologie für die Physiotherapie (ed.), 5th ed., Urban & Fischer/Elsevier, Munich, 2022, ISBN 978-3-437-45305-2.
- Springer Lexikon Physiotherapie: von A–Z (ed.), 2nd ed., Springer, Berlin, 2014, ISBN 978-3-642-38913-9.
- With Edgar Hinkelthein: Diagnose- und Therapiekonzepte in der Osteopathie, 3rd ed., Springer, Berlin, 2021, ISBN 978-3-662-62692-4.
