= Pariser Platz =

Square in Berlin, Germany

- Pariser Platz with the Brandenburg Gate
- Interactive map of Pariser Platz
- Former names: Viereck or Quarree; (1734–1814)
- Namesake: Paris, France
- Type: Public square
- Area: c. 1.5 ha (3.7 acres)
- Location: Berlin, Germany
- Quarter: Mitte
- Nearest metro station: Brandenburger Tor
- Coordinates: 52°30′59″N 13°22′44″E
- West end: Straße des 17. Juni; Platz des 18. März; Brandenburg Gate
- East end: Unter den Linden

Construction
- Inauguration: 1734

Pariser Platz (transl. Parisian Square) is a square in the historic center of Berlin, Germany, situated by the Brandenburg Gate at the end of Unter den Linden boulevard. The square is named after the French capital of Paris to commemorate the victory of the Sixth Coalition over the French Empire at the Battle of Paris (1814), and is one of the main focal points of the city.

== History ==
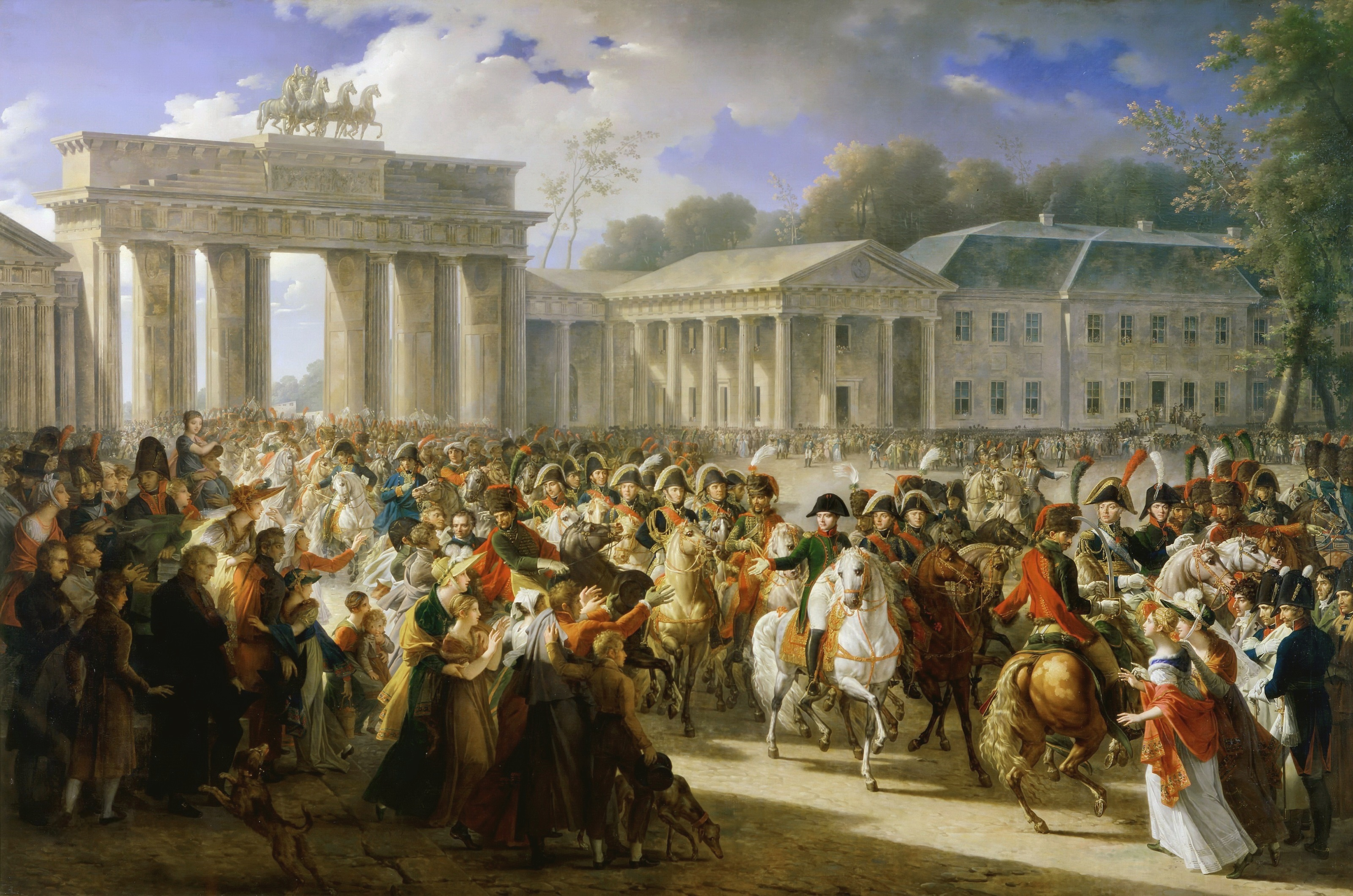
Entry of Napoleon into Berlin by Charles Meynier depicting Napoleon in Pariser Platz, 1806

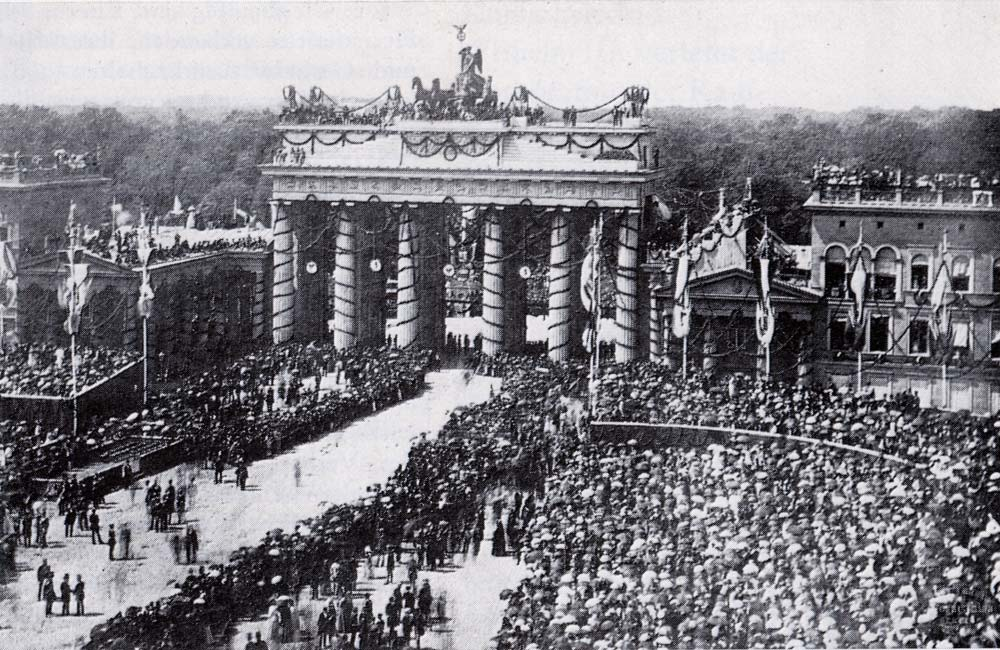
The Brandenburg Gate in 1871 with decorations and victorious Prussian troops after the Franco-Prussian War

Pariser Platz is the square immediately behind the Brandenburg Gate when approaching the historic heart of Berlin from the zoological garden in the west. The Neoclassical Brandenburg Gate was completed in the early 1790s by Carl Gotthard Langhans. Until 1814, the square was known simply as Viereck or Quarree (the Square). In March 1814, after Prussian troops along with the other Allies captured Paris after the overthrow of Napoleon, it was renamed Pariser Platz to mark this triumph.

The Brandenburg Gate was the main gate in the western side of the Customs Wall that surrounded the city in the eighteenth century. In fact, the Pariser Platz is located at the western end of Unter den Linden, the ceremonial axis of the city, down which the victorious troops of all regimes ranging from the Hohenzollern's to the German Democratic Republic have marched in triumph.

Before World War II, Pariser Platz was the grandest square in Berlin, surrounded by the American and French embassies, the finest hotel (the Adlon Hotel), the Academy of the Arts, and several blocks of apartments and offices.

During the last years of World War II, all the buildings around the square were turned to rubble by air raids and heavy artillery bombardment. The only structure left standing in the ruins of Pariser Platz was the Brandenburg Gate, which was restored by the East Berlin and West Berlin governments. After the war and especially with the construction of the Berlin Wall, the square was laid waste and became part of the death zone dividing the city.

When the city was reunited in 1990, there was broad consensus that the Pariser Platz should be made into a fine urban space again. The embassies would move back, the hotel and arts academy would be reinstated, and prestigious firms would be encouraged to build round the square. Under the rules of reconstruction, eaves heights had to be 22 meters, and buildings had to have a proper termination against the sky. Stone cladding was to be used as far as possible. Interpretations of these constraints, however, have varied to a great extent.

== Buildings ==
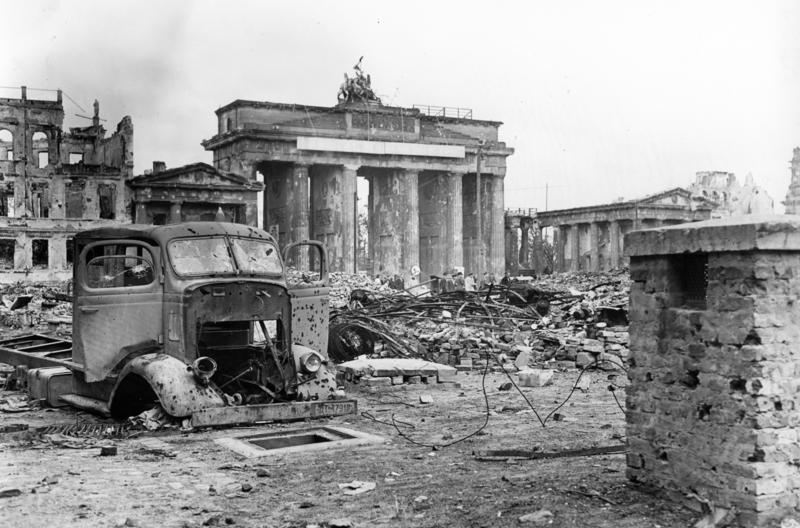
Pariser Platz in June 1945

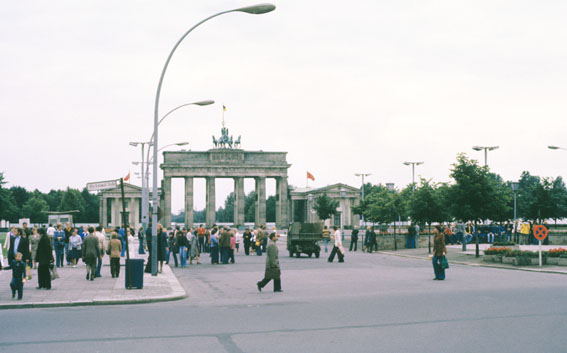
East Germany's Pariser Platz, 1977

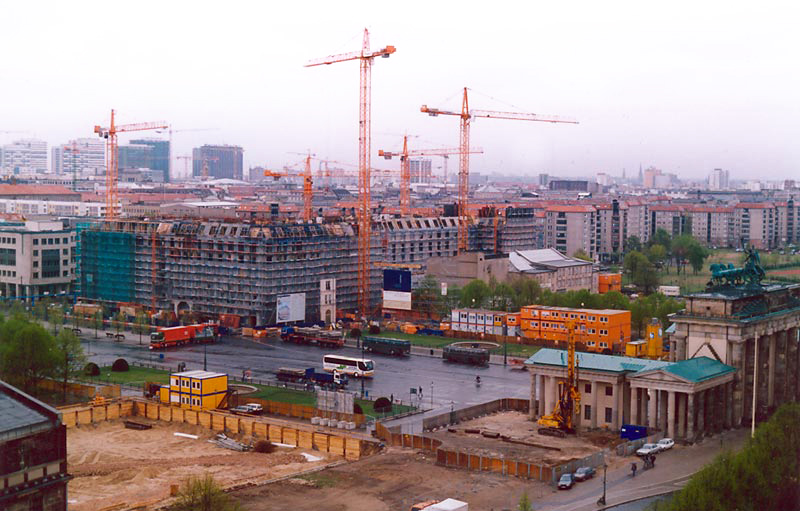
Pariser Platz in 1995

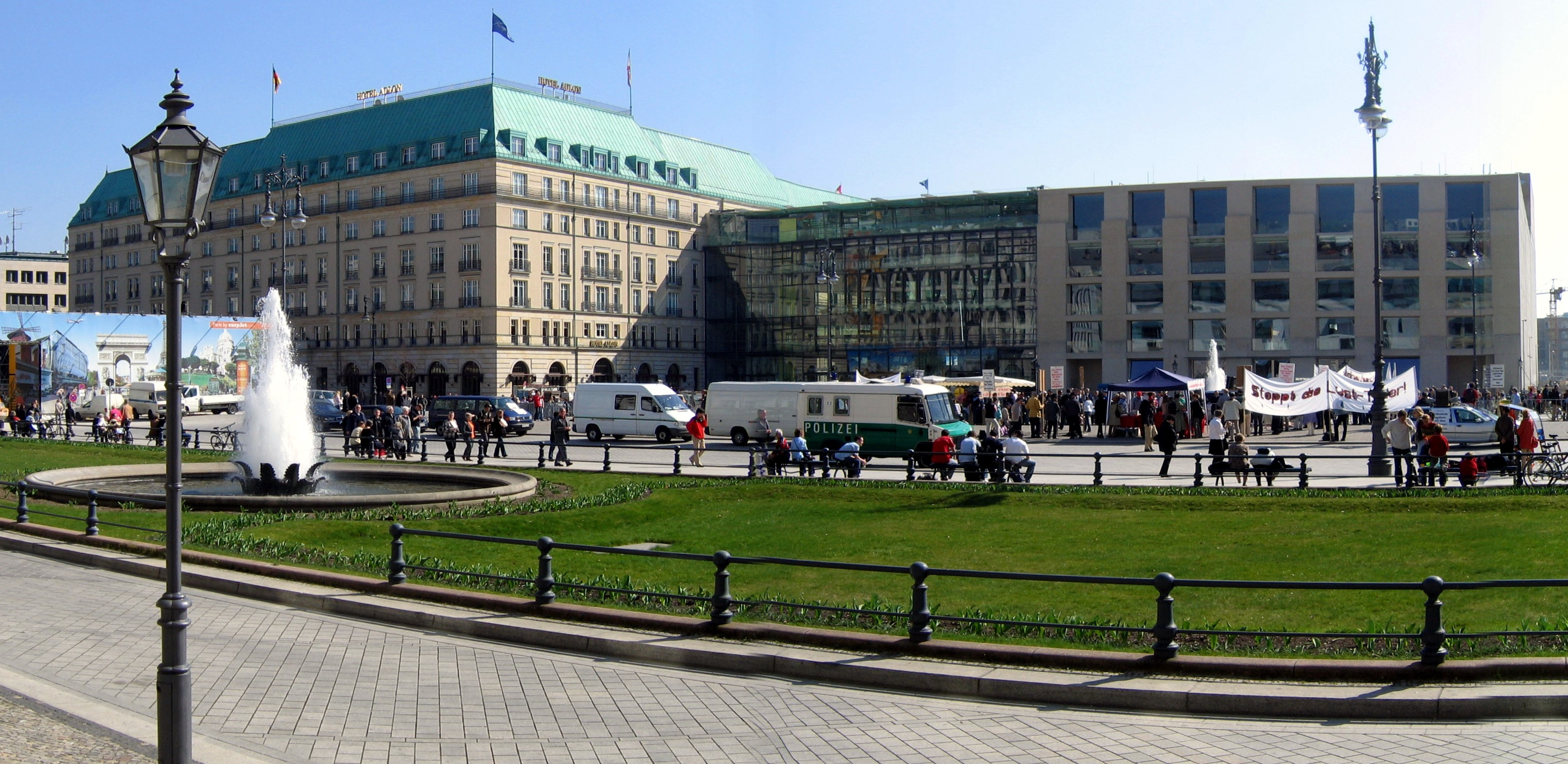
Pariser Platz with the new Adlon Hotel

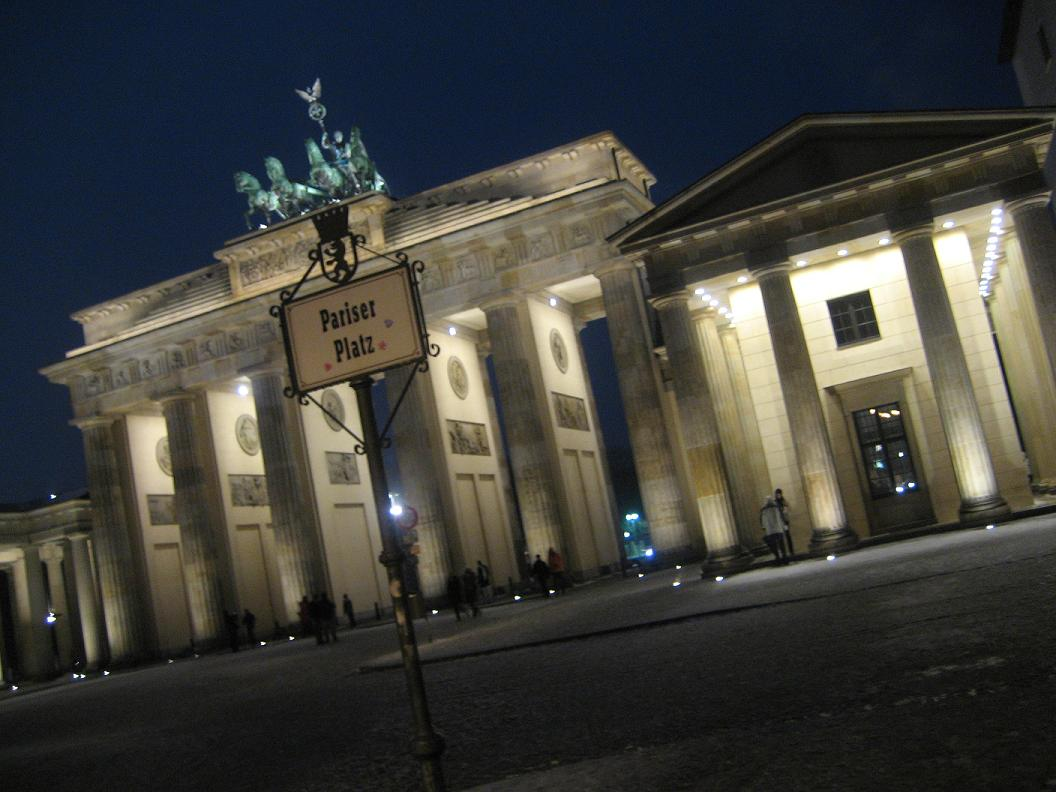
Pariser Platz in January 2009

The following is a partial list of buildings and structures on Pariser Platz, working anti clockwise from the Brandenburg Gate:

- Brandenburg Gate
- Haus Sommer, used by Commerzbank
- U.S. Embassy
- Palais Wrangel, used by DZ Bank
- Academy of Arts, Berlin
- Brandenburg Gate Museum
- Hotel Adlon
- French Embassy
- Eugen-Gutmann-Haus, used by Dresdner Bank
- Palais am Pariser Platz
- Haus Liebermann

In the vicinity of Pariser Platz are:

- North: Reichstag building and government district
- South: Memorial to the Murdered Jews of Europe
- Southeast: British Embassy at Wilhelmstrasse
- East: Embassy of Russia, Berlin and Embassy of Hungary at Unter den Linden

== Notable residents ==
- Achim von Arnim, poet and novelist
- Ernst von Ihne architect
- August von Kotzebue, dramatist
- Max Liebermann, painter
- Giacomo Meyerbeer, composer
- Friedrich Carl von Savigny, jurist (Historical School)
- Albert Speer, architect, Nazi minister for armaments
- Friedrich von Wrangel, Prussian Generalfeldmarschall

== Transport ==
Near the square is the Brandenburger Tor underground station which is served by the Berlin S-Bahn S1 line, and is a station on Berlin U-Bahn line U5. The S-Bahn station was opened in 1936 with the name Unter den Linden and was closed in 1961 with the construction of the Berlin Wall, becoming one of Berlin's ghost stations. It reopened on September 1, 1990.

The square itself is closed to automobile traffic, but is served by local bus lines nearby.

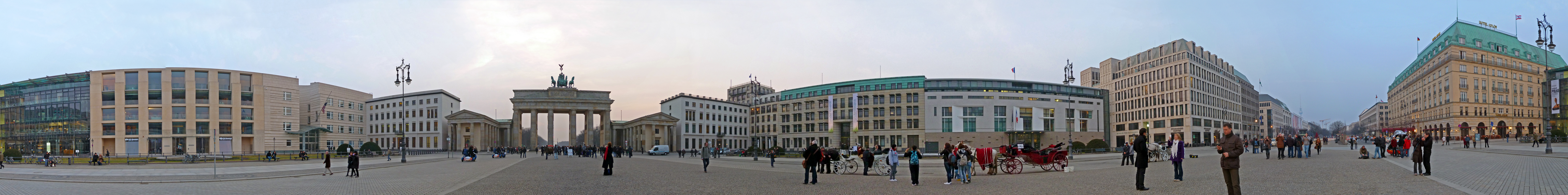
Panorama of the Pariser Platz (2011)
