= Embassy of France, Berlin =

Diplomatic mission of France in Germany

Coordinates: 52°31′01″N 13°22′45″E

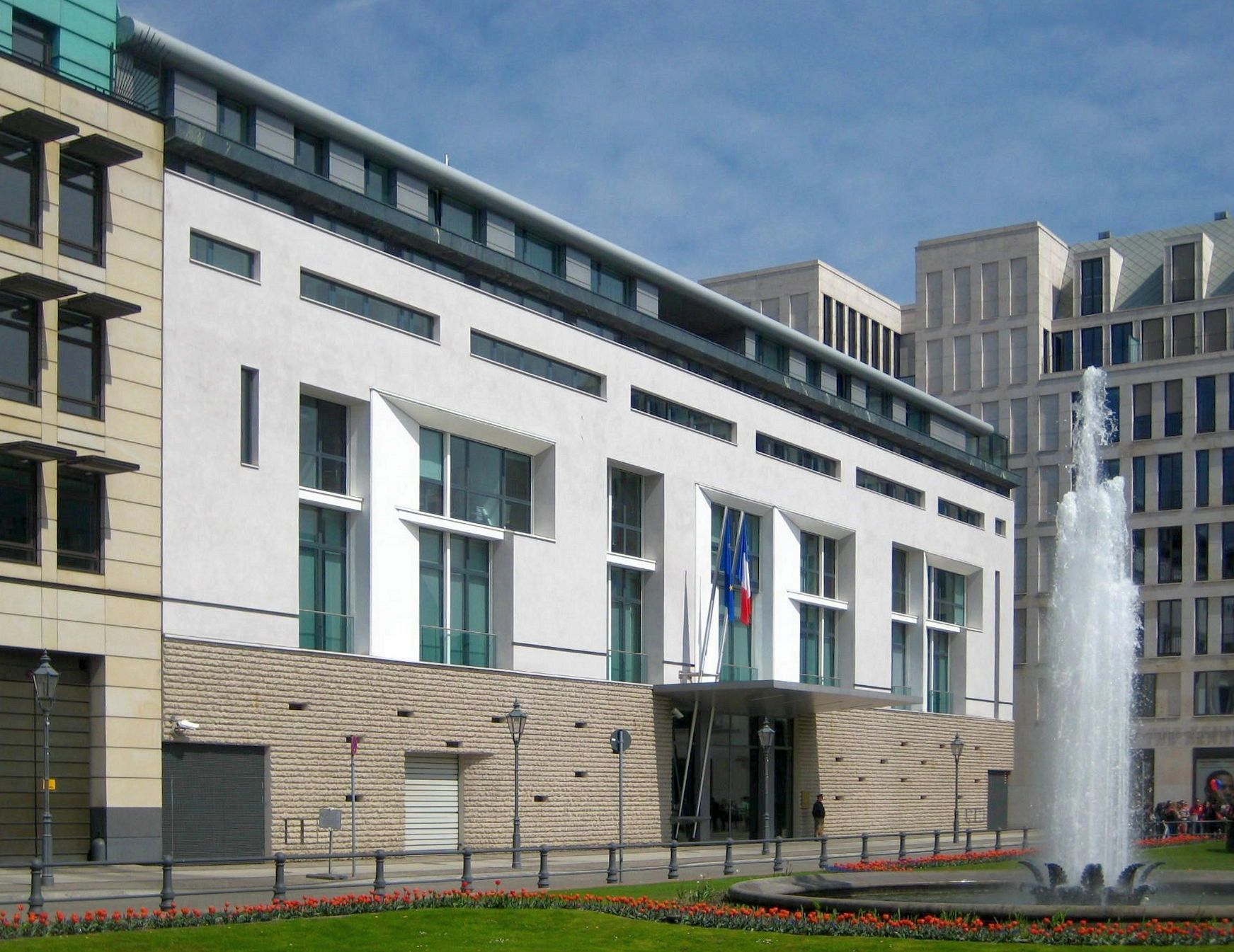
- Embassy of France in Berlin
- Address: Pariser Platz 5 Berlin, Germany

Logo of French Embassy in Berlin

The Embassy of France in Berlin is the diplomatic mission of the French Republic in Germany. Designed by Christian de Portzamparc and completed in 2002, it is at the same address, Pariser Platz 5, as the former embassy which was destroyed in World War II. Prior to German reunification, France had an embassy in the German Democratic Republic at a different address in Berlin and an embassy in the Federal Republic in Bonn.

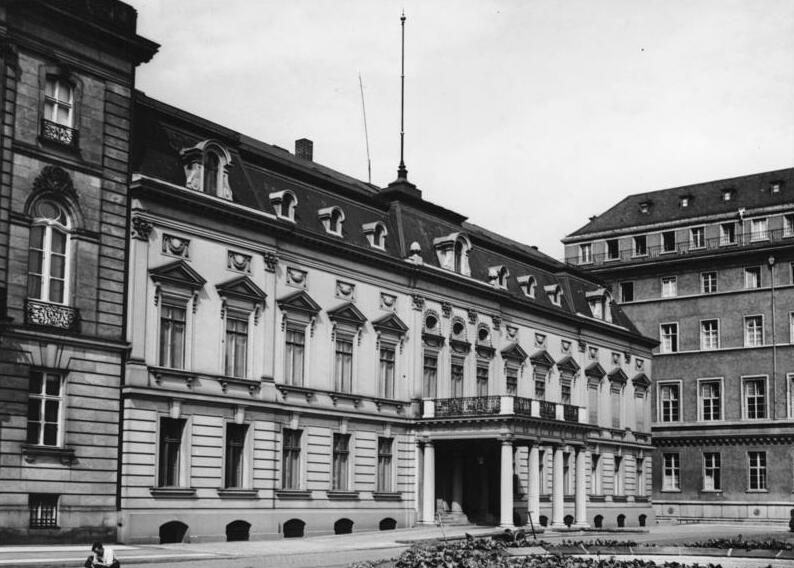
Palais Beauvryé, former building of the French embassy in Berlin, photographed in 1937

== Palais Beauvryé ==
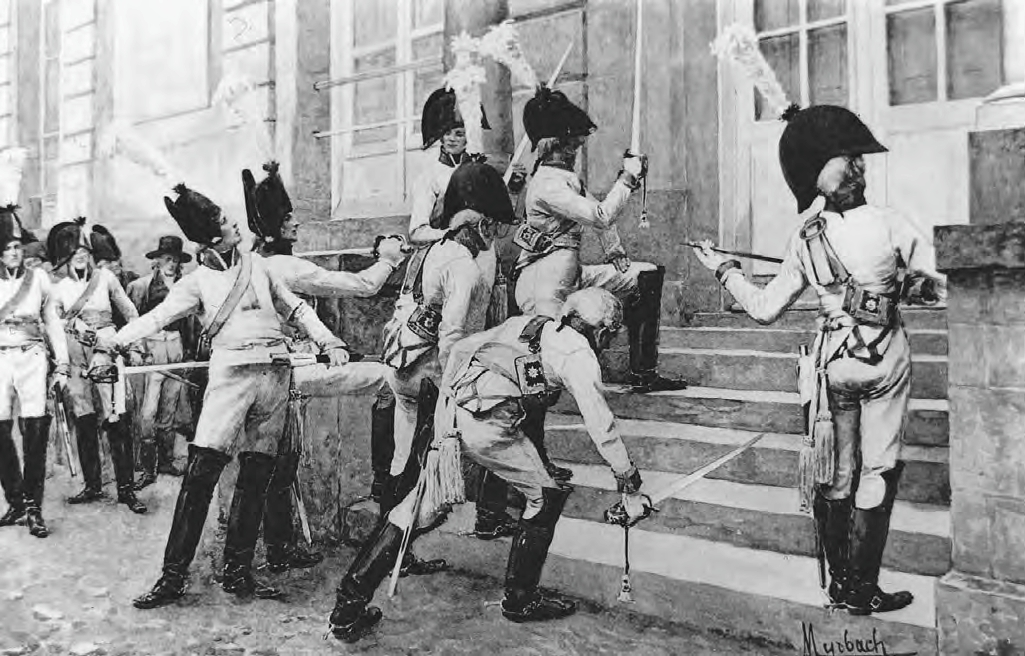
Officers of the élite Prussian Gardes du Corps, wishing to provoke the War of the Fourth Coalition, ostentatiously sharpen their swords on the steps of the French embassy in Berlin in the autumn of 1805.

The French embassy to the Kingdom of Prussia was established in 1860 under Napoleon III in the Palais Beauvryé, a building in late Baroque style which had been built at Pariser Platz 5 between 1735 and 1737 for Major Bernhard von Beauvryé. Following German unification and the resumption of diplomatic relations after the Franco-Prussian War, it became the French embassy to the German Empire. The building was modified in the 1840s by Friedrich August Stüler without much change to its external appearance, extensively renovated in 1879–83, including a mansard roof and a Mannerist façade with a columned portico replacing the stairs leading to the entrance, and modernised in 1907–14, including electrification and a telephone connection. During World War I, when diplomatic relations were suspended, it was in the care of the Spanish Embassy. The embassy staff were evacuated to Denmark on August 4, 1914, after burning classified papers and would not return until after the war. It was destroyed during the Battle of Berlin on 2 May 1945, a few days before the end of World War II in Europe.

== German Democratic Republic ==
The embassy site was very close to the border between the Western zones and the Soviet zone which became East Berlin and, like the nearby British Embassy, it was not rebuilt. The ruins were cleared in 1959, and after the construction of the Berlin Wall, the site fell within the cleared 'death strip' to the east of it. After France recognised the German Democratic Republic in 1973, an embassy was established at Unter den Linden 40, next door to the FDJ.

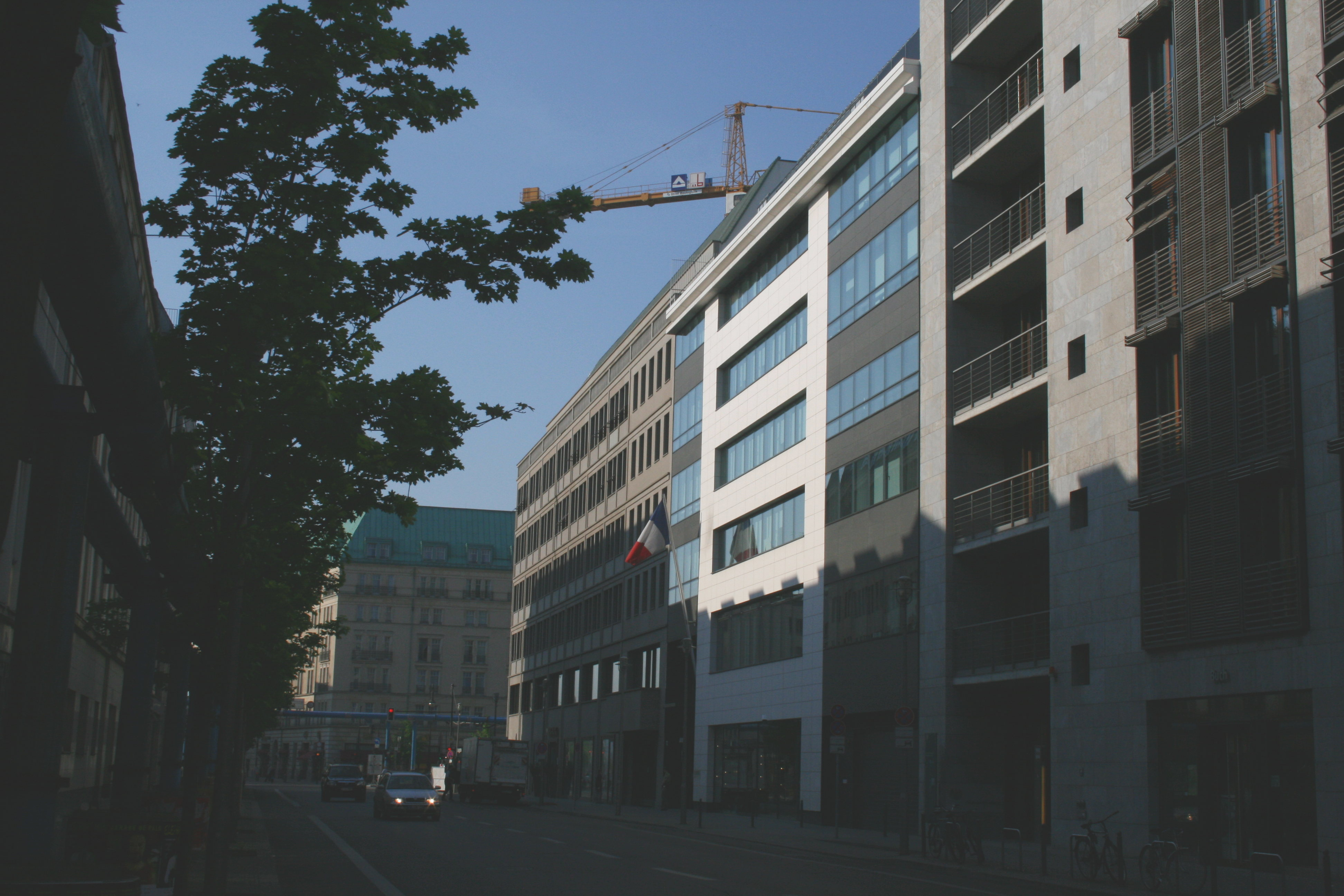
Wilhelmstraße frontage

== Current building ==
The embassy has approximately 250 employees and is one of France's largest. The present embassy building was designed by Christian de Portzamparc, who won the 1997 competition for the commission after German reunification and the decision to return the government of the Federal Republic of Germany to Berlin from Bonn. It is substantially on the original site, but the northern portion was exchanged in a land swap for a piece of land on Wilhelmstraße. The public entrance is on this eastern side of the building, leading to the consular and informational section; private entrances for staff and official visitors on Pariser Platz lead to the western section which includes the official reception areas and the ambassador's residence on the top floor. An auditorium and meeting rooms are in the centre of the building. The eastern section includes a public sculpture courtyard, with one bronze showing damage from having previously stood in the old embassy building; there is a private garden on an upper level in the western section, overlooked by a line of birch trees from the Himalayas. The Recouverte, the two-storey-high passage through the building between Pariser Platz and Wilhelmstraße, was intended to be open to the public, and is paved like the pavement outside to encourage visitors, but is closed for security reasons. The interior decoration is by the architect's wife, Elizabeth de Portzamparc, with art deco touches in the ambassadorial residence.

The foundation stone for the new building was laid in 1998. The building was occupied in October 2002 and formally opened by Jacques Chirac on 23 January 2003, the 40th anniversary of the Élysée Treaty between Germany and France. (The embassy was in temporary quarters in Kreuzberg and Charlottenburg during construction.) The style is a modern neo-classical in harmony with the other buildings in Pariser Platz, and conforms to the Berlin Senate's regulations for buildings there. However, the building was much criticised by the reconstructionist Gesellschaft Historisches Berlin (Society for Historic Berlin) and in the city press as resembling a "barricade" or a "bunker". The narrow windows meant to enliven and give "rhythm" to the massive stone base required by the regulations and by security concerns reminded some of gun-slits. The mayor of Mitte, Joachim Zeller, described the architecture as "wilful". However, the Berlin Senate's Director of Building, Hans Stimmann, defended it as an excellent interpretation of the restrictions and praised the inclusion of a garden, up to then unique in the square. The critique in Deutsche Bauzeitung was that the façade in the Pariser Platz was for the most part too "cheap" and "banal" to withstand close examination and showed flair only in the angling of the large windows on Pariser Platz towards the nearby Brandenburg Gate, while much of the building suffered from lack of spaciousness. In contrast, a critic writing in the Tagesspiegel judged it successful in reinterpreting the architecture of the past in present-day terms, and in resembling a palace rather than an office building on the Pariser Platz side, but appropriately suiting the appearance of the Wilhelmstraße façade to its neighbours and its purpose as the entrance to a consular office. He also praised the internal articulation into multiple distinct spaces on multiple levels, the variety of treatments and colourings of the concrete used in construction and the effective use of natural light in a space awkwardly enclosed by the firewalls of adjoining buildings, but found the interior decoration somewhat in conflict with the architectural character of the building. Some have found the interior disappointingly incoherent.
