= Brandenburg Gate Museum =

Museum in Berlin

The Brandenburg Gate Museum was a private museum in Berlin which opened as THE GATE Berlin on April 27, 2016. It was situated vis-à-vis the Brandenburg Gate in the building Pariser Platz 4a and told 300 years of Berlin history in a multimedia show. Since its founding the Brandenburg Gate Museum was part of the Long Night of Museums in Berlin. The museum has been closed since the end of April 2019.

== Permanent exhibition ==
On a 71 m^{2} (764 sq ft) large panoramic screen which covered three walls of the room the museum showed a visual history presentation without language barriers. A 38 channel surround system provided a supporting 3D sound experience. The show took 20 minutes to illustrate Berlin, German and world history based on the Brandenburg Gate. The supporting exhibition deepened the historical facts and showed a faithful replica of the head of Nike, the Brandenburg Gate Quadriga charioteer and goddess of victory.

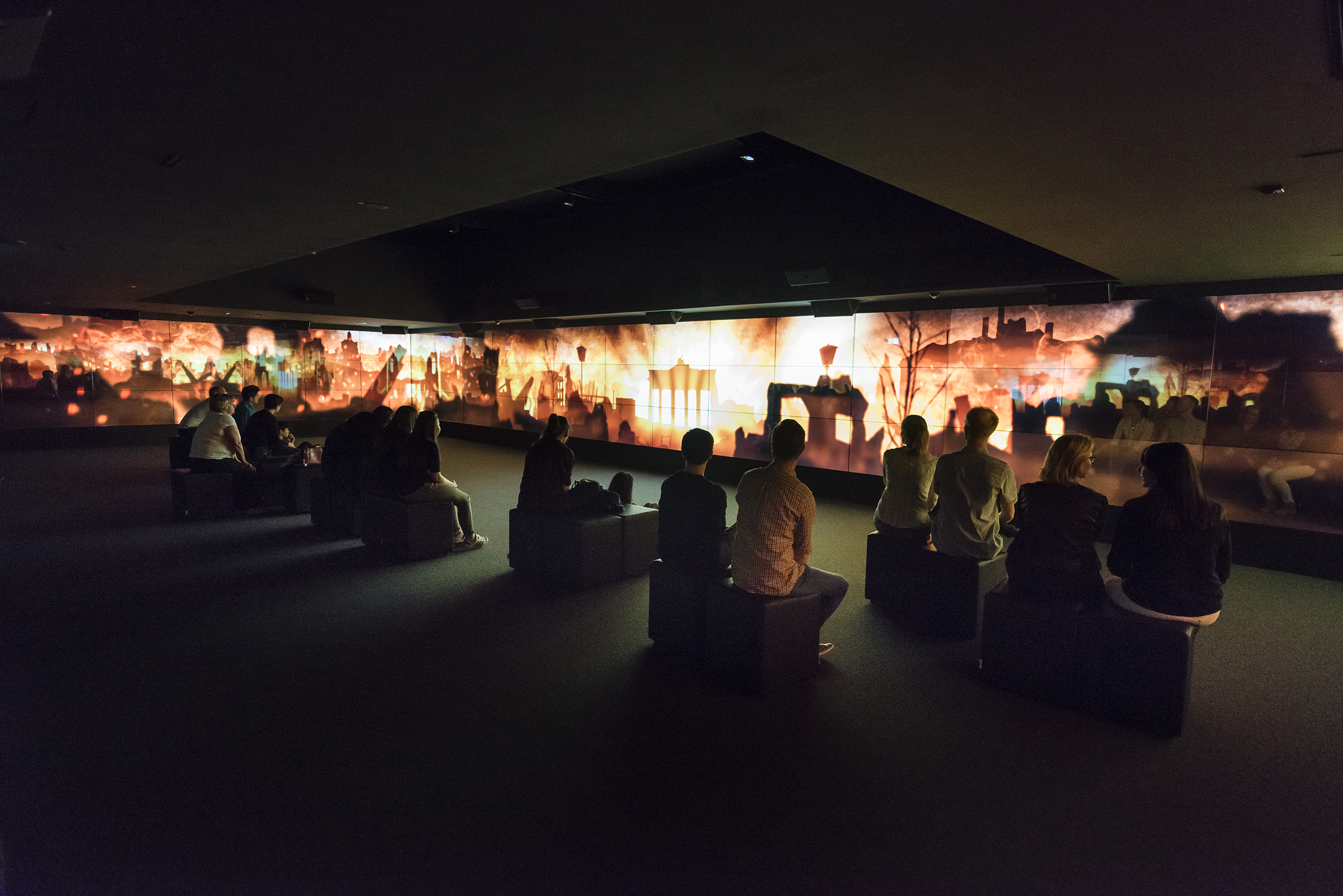
The history show

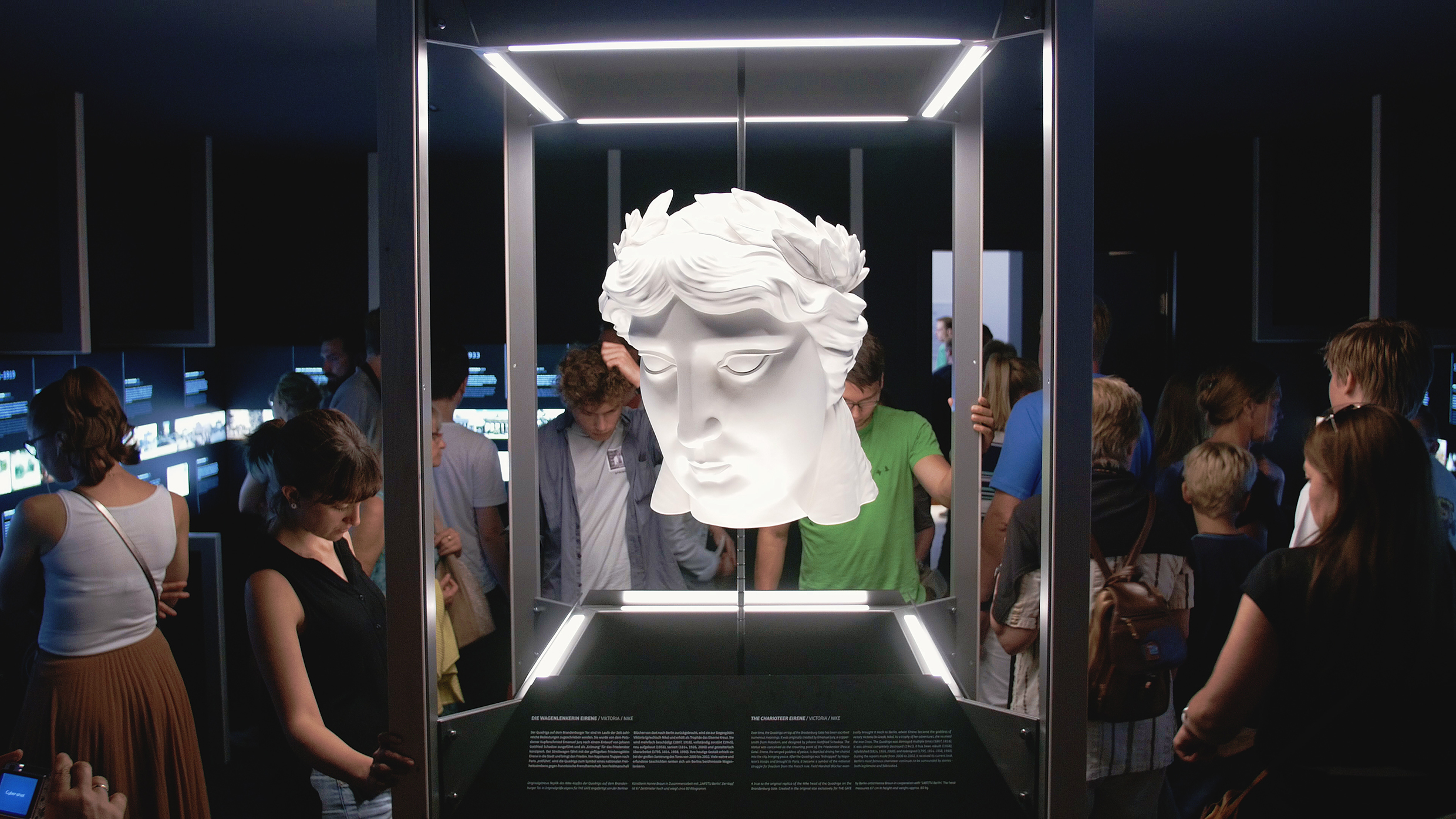
The replica of Nike

Main topics of the exhibition were the following:

- Emergence of Berlin and construction of the Brandenburg Gate
- Revolution of 1848 and Industrial Revolution
- German Empire
- World War I
- Weimar Republic and the Golden Twenties
- Nazi Germany and persecution of Jews
- World War II
- Cold War and building of the Berlin Wall
- Fall of the Berlin Wall, 1990s and Techno
- 2006 FIFA World Cup in Germany and win of the 2014 FIFA World Cup
- Berlin today

In the exit area there was a shop and a cafe.
