= Slanted Publishers =

Independent German publisher

Slanted
- Editor: Since 2014 Slanted Publishers (before MAGMA Brand Design)
- Categories: Magazine for typography, design, illustration, and photography
- Frequency: 2 x per year
- Publisher: Slanted Publishers
- First issue: 2005
- Country: Germany
- Based in: Karlsruhe
- Website: www.slanted.de
- ISSN: 1867-6510

Slanted Publishers is an independent German publisher. The publishing house is based in Karlsruhe and was founded in 2014 by Lars Harmsen and Julia Kahl. It publishes Slanted, the magazine for typography, and other publications dealing with contemporary art, illustration, design, photography, and typography.

== Magazine Slanted ==
Slanted Publishers publishes the biannual print magazine Slanted. The magazine was founded in 2005. It focuses on international design and cultural creation. Each issue is dedicated to a specific typographical or country-specific topic with an appropriately designed layout. The editorial office is located in Karlsruhe. As of May 2020, 35 issues of the magazine were published (excluding special editions), each of which is dedicated to a specific typographic or location-related topic. Between 2013 and 2020 four special issues have been published.

The magazine has won awards in national and international design competitions. Among others it received the Designpreis der Bundesrepublik Deutschland (Design Award of the Federal Republic of Germany) (Silver, 2009) and the German Design Award 2018.

== Website Slanted.de ==
The publishing house operates the website Slanted.de. Since 2004, daily news and events from the fields of design, typography, illustration, and photography of the international design scene have been published here. Portfolios from all over the world are presented.

The website has more than 180 video interviews with design personalities as contemporary witnesses as of 2020, including Milton Glaser, Steven Heller, Louise Fili, Lance Wyman, Michael Bierut, Niklaus Troxler, and Wolfgang Weingart.

The blog was ranked among the 100 most important German-language corporate blogs in 2008 and received the gold medal in the category “Weblog of the Year” at the LeadAwards 2008.

== Publications ==
- Slanted Publishers, Nigel Cottier, Letterform Variations, 2021-11, ISBN 978-3-948440-35-0
- Slanted Publishers, Film Festival Cologne—Die Macht der Bilder, 2021-10, ISBN 978-3-948440-34-3
- Slanted Publishers, Dr. Martin Lorenz, Flexible Visual Systems, 2021-10, ISBN 978-3-948440-30-5
- Slanted Publishers, Emanuele Sferruzza Moszkowicz, Il Teatro è Il Teatro è Il Teatro, 2021-10, ISBN 978-3-948440-31-2
- Slanted Publishers, Volker Derlath, Oktoberfest 1984–2019, 2021-09, ISBN 978-3-948440-28-2
- Slanted Publishers, 100 Poster Battle 2020–2021, 2021-09, ISBN 978-3-948440-29-9
- Slanted Publishers, Clara Hoppe, INSTANT NUDES, 2021-08, ISBN 978-3-948440-23-7
- Slanted Publishers, Kevin Halpin, Please Come: Shameless/Limitless—Selected Posters & Texts 2008–2020, 2021-06, ISBN 978-3-948440-26-8
- Slanted Publishers, Büro Destruct, Büro Destruct 4—By Büro Destruct, 2021-06, ISBN 978-3-948440-27-5
- Slanted Publishers, Jeremiah Chiu, Jeremiah Chiu – Ou(te)r Space, 2021-06, ISBN 978-3-948440-25-1
- Slanted Publishers, Yearbook of Type 2021 / 22, 2021-04, ISBN 978-3-948440-24-4
- Slanted Publishers, Florian Budke, Ar/Kate Mannheim, 2021-04, ISBN 978-3-948440-17-6
- Slanted Publishers, Cihan Tamti, Cihan Tamti — Breakout–100 Posters Book, ISBN 978-3-948440-22-0
- Slanted Publishers, Juliane Nöst, Teasing Typography, 2021-03, ISBN 978-3-948440-20-6
- Slanted Publishers, Roman Klonek, Woodcut Vibes, 2021-02, ISBN 978-3-948440-19-0
- Slanted Publishers, Marian Misiak, Lars Harmsen, Support Independent Type—the New Culture of Type Specimens, 2020-12, ISBN 978-3-948440-12-1
- Slanted Publishers, Eliana Berger, Kurt Bille, Lara von Richthofen, Lena Kronenbürger, fortytwomagazine #5—space, 2020-12, ISBN 978-3-948440-18-3
- Slanted Publishers, Christian Beck, Tea Trip – eine faszinierende Reise durch das Reich der Mitte, 2020-12, ISBN 978-3-948440-16-9
- Slanted Publishers, Benjamin Wurster, Leafy House Plants, 2020-11, ISBN 978-3-948440-15-2
- Slanted Publishers, Rubén Sánchez, Today is Tomorrow’s Yesterday, 2020-10, ISBN 978-3-948440-10-7
- Slanted Publishers, Paula Riek, Questions to Europe (En) / Fragen an Europa (De), 2020-10, ISBN 978-3-948440-13-8, 978-3-948440-14-5,
- Slanted Publishers, Stefan Braun, Monopoli: a fishing village in Apulia, 2020-10, ISBN 978-3-948440-07-7
- Slanted Publishers, Jannis Maroscheck, Shape Grammars, 2020-07, ISBN 978-3-948440-09-1
- Slanted Publishers, Slanted Special Issue Rhineland-Palatinate, 2020-07, ISBN 978-3-948440-08-4
- Slanted Publishers, Maviblau, Şimdi heißt jetzt, 2020-04, ISBN 978-3-948440-06-0
- Slanted Publishers, Markus Lange, Karl-Heinz Drescher—Berlin Typo Posters, Texts, and Interviews, 2020-02, ISBN 978-3-948440-00-8
- Slanted Publishers, Dirk Gebhardt, Beneath the veil of Cairo, 2020-01, ISBN 978-3-948440-05-3
- Slanted Publishers, Kai Jünemann, Will Feel Eyes on, 2019-12, ISBN 978-3-948440-03-9
- Slanted Publishers, Slanted Special Issue – Rwanda, 2019-08, ISBN 978-3-948440-02-2
- Slanted Publishers, Marie Schaller, Mara Schneider, Florian Brugger, Lars Harmsen, Melville Brand Design, Studio Markus Lange, Apollo 11–The Eagle Has Landed*, 2019-07, ISBN 978-3-9818296-9-3
- Slanted Publishers, Dirk Gebhard, Play Life—Neighbors in the Western Balkans, 2019-06, ISBN 978-3-9818296-4-8
- Slanted Publishers, Ian Lynam, Total Armageddon—A Slanted Reader on Design, 2019-03, ISBN 978-3-9818296-6-2
- Slanted Publishers, Robert Eysoldt & Raban Ruddigkeit, Berlin Design Digest – 100 successful projects, products, and processes, 2017-04, ISBN 978-3-9818296-0-0
- Slanted Publishers, Dirk Gebhardt, Cuba – 90 años fidel un recuerdo de cuba, 2016-12, ISBN 978-3-9818296-1-7
- Slanted Publishers (Editor), niggli Verlag, Yearbook of Type II, 2015-10, ISBN 978-3-7212-0942-6
- Slanted Publishers (Editor), niggli Verlag, Slanted Publishers, Yearbook of Type I, 2013-06, ISBN 978-3-7212-0861-0
- Slanted Publishers, Slanted Magazine, ISSN 1867-6510

== Awards ==
- ADC Germany: 2021, 2020, 2019, 2014, 2013, 2012, 2010, 2008, 2007
- Berliner Type: 2009, 2008
- DDC Wettbewerb – GUTE GESTALTUNG: 2019
- Designpreis der BRD: 2009
- European Design Awards: 2020, 2012, 2011, 2010, 2008
- iF communication design award: 2007
- German Design Award: 2020, 2018, 2017, 2016
- Lead Awards: 2013, 2008
- Tokyo TDC: 2021, 2017, 2016, 2015
- ADC of Europe: 2020
