= MS Wissenschaft =

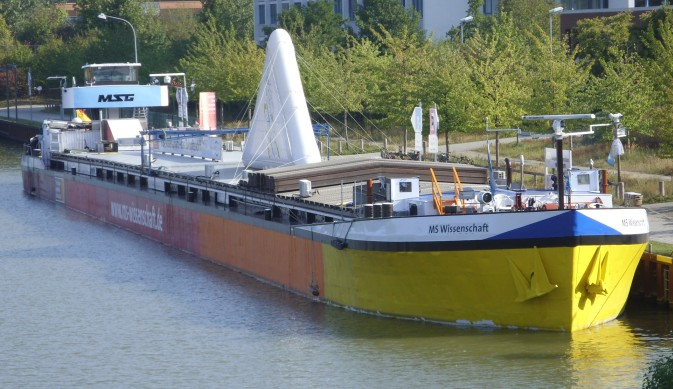
- MS Wissenschaft in 2009

History

Germany
- Builder: Elfring shipyard
- Launched: 1969

General characteristics
- Length: 100 m (330 ft)
- Beam: 9.5 m (31 ft)
- Draft: max. 3.16 m (10.4 ft)

MS Wissenschaft ("MS Science") is an exhibition ship in Germany. It is named after Wissenschaft, the German term for any study or science that involves systematic research and teaching. It is a project of Wissenschaft im Dialog and the Federal Ministry of Education and Research (Germany). The ship travels through Germany and also through Switzerland and Austria for several months of the year showing temporary exhibitions in line with the respective Science Year.

== Exhibition ship MS Wissenschaft ==
=== History ===
The ship was built in 1969 at the former Elfring shipyard in Haren. In 2002, the University of Bremen hired the cargo ship, then called Geoschiff, which was used as a floating exhibition on geoscience for six months. Due to the success of this, MS Wissenschaft has been used as a science exhibition ship every summer since 2003. For the use as MS Wissenschaft the ship is converted every year.

=== Exhibitions ===
On its tours, MS Wissenschaft visits numerous cities throughout Germany, which it can reach on inland waterways. In 2005, Basel in Switzerland, the first foreign city to be reached via the Rhine, was also on the tour schedule. Since 2010, several cities along the Danube in the neighboring country of Austria have also been visited.

Image	Year	Theme	Ship name	Notes	References
	2002	Geoscience	Geoschiff	The exhibition lasted 6 months and explored marine science.	
	2003	Chemistry	MS Chemie	The ship visited 26 cities, with over 40,000 visitors.	
	2004	Technology	MS Technik	The ship visited 31 cities featuring an exhibition about the expansion of human capabilities through technology.	
	2005	Albert Einstein	MS Einstein	The ship visited 37 cities, with over 100,000 visitors. With Basel, the ship landed for the first time in a non-German city.	
	2006	Sports and computer science	MS Wissenschaft – Sport und Informatik	The ship visited 34 cities, with approximately 74,000 visitors.	
	2007	Language	MS Wissenschaft – Sprache ist mehr als Worte	The ship visited 34 cities, with approximately 77,000 visitors.	
	2008	Mathematics	MS Wissenschaft – das Matheschiff	The ship visited 31 cities, with approximately 118,000 visitors.	
	2009	Future	MS Wissenschaft – das Zukunftsschiff	The ship visited 34 cities, with approximately 90,000 visitors including 650 school classes.	
	2010	Energy	MS Wissenschaft – das Energieschiff	The ship visited 36 cities, with approximately 105,000 visitors. For the first time, the ship also called at Austrian cities, including Vienna, Krems and Linz.	
	2011	Medicine	MS Wissenschaft – Neue Wege in der Medizin	The ship visited 35 cities, with approximately 72,000 visitors.	
	2012	Sustainability	MS Wissenschaft – Zukunftsprojekt Erde	The ship visited 36 cities, with approximately 90,000 visitors.	
	2013	Demographic change	MS Wissenschaft – Alle Generationen in einem Boot	The ship visited 37 cities.	
	2014	Digitization	MS Wissenschaft – Digital unterwegs	The ship visited 38 cities.	
	2015	Cities of the future	MS Wissenschaft – Zukunftsstadt	The ship visited 40 cities.	
	2016/2017	Seas and Oceans	MS Wissenschaft – Meere und Ozeane	The ship visited 33 cities, starting with the northern states of Germany in 2016 and ending with the southern states in 2017.	
	2018	Working life of the future	MS Wissenschaft – Arbeitswelten der Zukunft		
	2021	Bioeconomy	MS Wissenschaft – Bioökonomie		
	2022	In demand	MS Wissenschaft – Nachgefragt		
	2023	Our Universe	MS Wissenschaft – Unser Universum		
	2024	Freedom	MS Wissenschaft – Freiheit		
