= Stephen King bibliography =

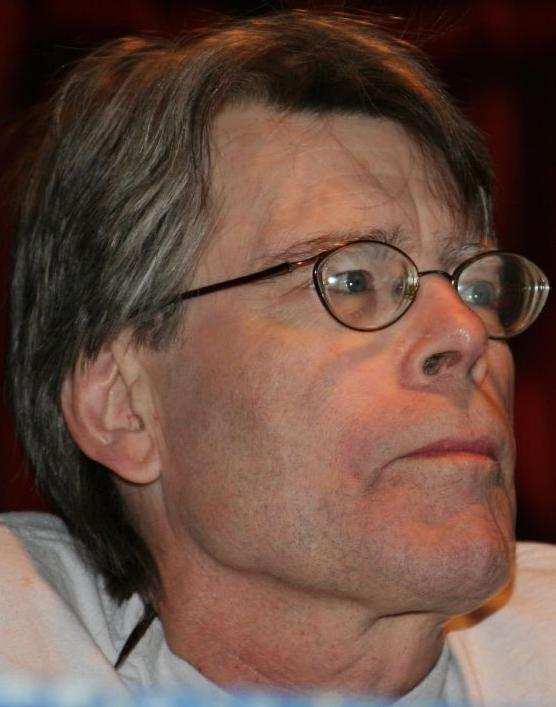
- Novels↙: 69
- Collections↙: 12
- Nonfiction↙: 5
- Screenplays / Teleplays↙: 19
- Others↙: 16

Stephen King is an American author of contemporary horror, thriller, science fiction, and fantasy. His books have sold more than 400 million copies, and many of them have been adapted into feature films, television movies, and comic books. King has published 67 novels/novellas, including seven under the pen name Richard Bachman, and five nonfiction books. He has written more than 200 short stories, most of which have been compiled in book collections. Many of his works are set in his home state of Maine.

== Novels ==
Overview of Stephen King novels
Year	Title	Publisher	ISBN	Pages	Notes
1974	Carrie	Doubleday	978-0-385-08695-0	199	
1975	'Salem's Lot	Doubleday	978-0-385-00751-1	439	Nominee, World Fantasy Award, 1976
1977	The Shining	Doubleday	978-0-385-12167-5	447	Runner-up (4th place), Locus Award for Best Fantasy Novel, 1978
1977	Rage	Signet Books	978-0-451-07645-8	211	First novel published under pseudonym Richard Bachman, now out of print at the author's request
1978	The Stand	Doubleday	978-0-385-12168-2	823	Nominee, World Fantasy Award, 1979; Runner-up (15th place), Locus Award, 1979; The Complete and Uncut Edition; Runner-up (2nd place), Locus Award's Best Horror/Dark Fantasy Novel, 1991
1979	The Long Walk	Signet Books	978-0-451-08754-6	384	Published under pseudonym Richard Bachman
1979	The Dead Zone	Viking Press	978-0-670-26077-5	428	Runner-up (2nd place), Locus Award for Best Fantasy Novel, 1980
1980	Firestarter	Viking Press	978-0-670-31541-3	426	Nominee, British Fantasy Award’s August Derleth Award, 1981; Runner-up (8th place), Locus Award for Best Science Fiction Novel, 1981
1981	Roadwork	Signet Books	978-0-451-09668-5	274	Published under pseudonym Richard Bachman
1981	Cujo	Viking Press	978-0-670-45193-7	319	Winner, British Fantasy Award’s August Derleth Award, 1982; Runner-up (21st place), Locus Award for Best Fantasy Novel, 1982
1982	The Running Man	Signet Books	978-0-451-11508-9	219	Published under pseudonym Richard Bachman
1982	The Gunslinger	Grant	978-0-937986-50-9	224	First novel in The Dark Tower series
1983	Christine	Viking	978-0-670-22026-7	526	Runner-up (6th place), Locus Award for Best Fantasy Novel, 1984
1983	Pet Sematary	Doubleday	978-0-385-18244-7	374	Nominee, World Fantasy Award, 1984; Runner-up (7th place), Locus Award for Best Fantasy Novel, 1984
1983	Cycle of the Werewolf	Land of Enchantment	978-0-9603828-2-8	127	Illustrated by Bernie Wrightson
1984	The Talisman	Viking	978-0-670-69199-9	646	Written with Peter Straub; Nominee, World Fantasy Award, 1985; Runner-up (4th place), Locus Award for Best Fantasy Novel, 1985
1984	Thinner	NAL	978-0-453-00468-8	309	Published under pseudonym Richard Bachman
1984	The Eyes of the Dragon	Philtrum Press	978-0-670-81458-9	326	First published as a limited edition in 1984, then for the mass market in 1987, by Viking Press
1986	It	Viking	978-0-670-81302-5	1138	Winner, British Fantasy Award’s August Derleth Award, 1987; Nominee, World Fantasy Award, 1987; Runner-up (3rd place), Locus Award for Best Fantasy Novel, 1987
1987	The Drawing of the Three	Grant	978-0-937986-90-5	400	Second novel in The Dark Tower series; Runner-up (16th place), Locus Award for Best Fantasy Novel, 1988
1987	Misery	Viking	978-0-670-81364-3	310	Winner, Bram Stoker Award, 1988; Nominee, World Fantasy Award, 1988
1987	The Tommyknockers	Putnam	978-0-399-13314-5	558	Runner-up (16th place), Locus Award for Best Science Fiction Novel, 1988
1989	The Dark Half	Viking	978-0-670-82982-8	431	Runner-up (2nd place), Locus Award for Best Horror Novel, 1990
1991	The Waste Lands	Grant	978-0-937986-17-2	512	Third novel in The Dark Tower series; Nominee, Bram Stoker Award, 1992; Runner-up (3rd place), Locus Award for Best Horror/Dark Fantasy Novel, 1992
1991	Needful Things	Viking	978-0-670-83953-7	690	Nominee, Bram Stoker Award, 1992; Runner-up (13th place), Locus Award for Best Horror/Dark Fantasy Novel, 1992
1992	Gerald's Game	Viking	978-0-670-84650-4	352	
1992	Dolores Claiborne	Viking	978-0-670-84452-4	305	Runner-up (14th place), Locus Award for Best Horror/Dark Fantasy Novel, 1993
1994	Insomnia	Viking	978-0-670-85503-2	787	Nominee, Bram Stoker Award, 1995; Runner-up (3rd place), Locus Award for Best Fantasy/Horror Novel, 1995
1995	Rose Madder	Viking	978-0-670-85869-9	420	Runner-up (3rd place), Locus Award for Best Horror/Dark Fantasy Novel, 1995
1996	Desperation	Viking	978-0-670-86836-0	704	Twin novel of The Regulators; Winner, Locus Award for Best Horror/Dark Fantasy Novel, 1997
1996	The Regulators	Dutton	978-0-525-94190-3	480	Published under pseudonym Richard Bachman; Twin novel of Desperation
1997	The Green Mile	Signet Books	978-0-452-27890-5	400	First published as a six-part serial novel in 1996; Winner, Bram Stoker Award, 1997; Runner-up (8th place), Locus Award for Best Horror/Dark Fantasy Novel, 1997
1997	Wizard and Glass	Grant	978-1-880418-38-3	787	Fourth novel in The Dark Tower series; Runner-up (4th place), Locus Award for Best Fantasy Novel, 1998; Runner-up (6th place), Locus Award for Best Art Book, 1998
1998	Bag of Bones	Scribner	978-0-684-85350-5	529	Winner, Bram Stoker Award, 1999; Winner, British Fantasy Award’s August Derleth Award, 1999; Winner, Locus Award for Best Dark Fantasy/Horror Novel, 1999
1999	The Girl Who Loved Tom Gordon	Scribner	978-0-684-86762-5	224	
2001	Dreamcatcher	Scribner	978-0-7432-1138-3	620	
2001	Black House	Random House	978-0-375-50439-6	625	Sequel to The Talisman; Written with Peter Straub; Nominee, Bram Stoker Award, 2002; Runner-up (7th place), Locus Award for Best Fantasy Novel, 2002
2002	From a Buick 8	Scribner	978-0-7432-1137-6	368	Nominee, Bram Stoker Award, 2003
2003	Wolves of the Calla	Grant	978-1-880418-56-7	714	Fifth novel in The Dark Tower series; Nominee, Bram Stoker Award, 2004; Runner-up (4th place), Locus Award for Best Fantasy Novel, 2004
2004	Song of Susannah	Grant	978-1-880418-59-8	432	Sixth novel in The Dark Tower series; Runner-up (4th place), Locus Award for Best Fantasy Novel, 2005
2004	The Dark Tower	Grant	978-1-880418-62-8	845	Seventh novel in The Dark Tower series; Winner, British Fantasy Award's August Derleth Award, 2005; Nominee, Bram Stoker Award, 2005
2005	The Colorado Kid	Hard Case Crime	978-0-8439-5584-2	184	
2006	Cell	Scribner	978-0-7432-9233-7	351	
2006	Lisey's Story	Scribner	978-0-7432-8941-2	528	Winner, Bram Stoker Award, 2007; Nominee, World Fantasy Award, 2007; Runner-up (10th place), Locus Award for Best Fantasy Novel, 2007
2007	Blaze	Scribner	978-1-4165-5484-4	304	Published under pseudonym Richard Bachman
2008	Duma Key	Scribner	978-1-4165-5251-2	607	Winner, Bram Stoker Award, 2009
2009	Under the Dome	Scribner	978-1-4391-4850-1	1074	Nominee, British Fantasy Award's August Derleth Award, 2010; Runner-up (7th place), Locus Award for Best Science Fiction Novel, 2010
2011	11/22/63	Scribner	978-1-4516-2728-2	849	Nominee, British Fantasy Award, 2012; Nominee, World Fantasy Award, 2012; Runner-up (2nd place), Locus Award for Best Science Fiction Novel, 2012
2012	The Wind Through the Keyhole	Grant	978-1-880418-76-5	336	The eighth Dark Tower novel, but chronologically set between the fourth and fifth volumes.
2013	Joyland	Hard Case Crime	978-1-78116-264-4	288	Nominee, Edgar Award for Best Paperback Original, 2014; Runner-up (11th place), Locus Award for Best Fantasy Novel, 2014
2013	Doctor Sleep	Scribner	978-1-4767-2765-3	531	Sequel to The Shining; Winner, Bram Stoker Award, 2014; Runner-up (5th place), Locus Award for Best Fantasy Novel, 2014
2014	Mr. Mercedes	Scribner	978-1-4767-5445-1	436	First novel in the Bill Hodges Trilogy; Winner, Edgar Award for Best Novel, 2015
2014	Revival	Scribner	978-1-4767-7038-3	403	Runner-up (8th place), Locus Award for Best Fantasy Novel, 2015
2015	Finders Keepers	Scribner	978-1-5011-0007-9	434	Second novel in the Bill Hodges Trilogy.
2016	End of Watch	Scribner	978-1-5011-2974-2	432	Third novel in the Bill Hodges Trilogy.
2017	Gwendy's Button Box	Cemetery Dance Publications	978-1-58767-610-9	175	Written with Richard Chizmar
2017	Sleeping Beauties	Scribner	978-1-5011-6340-1	702	Written with Owen King; Nominee, Bram Stoker Award, 2018
2018	The Outsider	Scribner	978-1-5011-8098-9	576	Runner-up (2nd place), Locus Award for Best Horror Novel, 2019
2018	Elevation	Scribner	978-1-9821-0231-9	144	
2019	The Institute	Scribner	978-1-9821-1056-7	576	Nominee, British Fantasy Award's August Derleth Award, 2020; Runner-up (3rd place), Locus Award for Best Horror Novel, 2020
2021	Later	Hard Case Crime	978-1-78909-649-1	256	
2021	Billy Summers	Scribner	978-1-9821-7361-6	528	
2022	Gwendy's Final Task	Cemetery Dance Publications	978-1-58767-801-1	412	Third novel in the series, second written with Richard Chizmar
2022	Fairy Tale	Scribner	978-1-6680-0217-9	599	
2023	Holly	Scribner	978-1-6680-1613-8	449	
2025	Never Flinch	Scribner	978-1-6680-8933-0	448	
2026	Other Worlds Than These	Scribner	978-1-66823-309-2	691	Third novel in The Talisman (Jack Sawyer) series; written with Peter Straub
2027	The End Times: Volume One	Bad Hand Books	978-1-9678-4636-8	220	Serialized epistolary novel written with Benjamin Percy; writing as Claudia Inez Bachman
2027	Anything for Holly	TBA	TBA	TBA	TBA

== Collections ==
Overview of Stephen King collections
Year	Title	Publisher	ISBN	Pages	Notes
1978	Night Shift	Doubleday	978-0-385-12991-6	336	Nominee, World Fantasy Award, 1979; Runner-up (8th place), Locus Award for Best Single Author Collection, 1979
1982	Different Seasons	Viking Press	978-0-670-27266-2	527	Nominee, World Fantasy Award, 1983; Runner-up (4th place), Locus Award for Best Single Author Collection, 1983
1985	Skeleton Crew	Putnam	978-0-399-13039-7	512	Winner, Locus Award for Best Collection, 1986; Nominee, World Fantasy Award, 1986
1990	Four Past Midnight	Viking Press	978-0-670-83538-6	763	Winner, Bram Stoker Award, 1991; Nominee, British Fantasy Award, 1991; Runner-up (6th place), Locus Award for Best Collection, 1991
1993	Nightmares & Dreamscapes	Viking Press	978-0-670-85108-9	816	Nominee, Bram Stoker Award, 1994; Runner-up (6th place), Locus Award for Best Collection, 1994
1999	Hearts in Atlantis	Scribner	978-0-684-85351-2	528	Nominee, Bram Stoker Award, 2000; Nominee, British Fantasy Award, 2000; Nominee, World Fantasy Award, 2000; Runner-up (5th place), Locus Award for Best Collection, 2000
2002	Everything's Eventual	Scribner	978-0-7432-3515-0	464	Nominee, Bram Stoker Award, 2003; Nominee, British Fantasy Award, 2003; Runner-up (5th place), Locus Award for Best Collection, 2003
2008	Just After Sunset	Scribner	978-1-4165-8408-7	386	Winner, Bram Stoker Award, 2009; Nominee, British Fantasy Award, 2009; Nominee, Shirley Jackson Award, 2009
2010	Full Dark, No Stars	Scribner	978-1-4391-9256-6	368	Winner, Bram Stoker Award, 2011; Winner, British Fantasy Award, 2011
2015	The Bazaar of Bad Dreams	Scribner	978-1-5011-1167-9	495	Winner, Shirley Jackson Award, 2016
2020	If It Bleeds	Scribner	978-1-9821-3797-7	448	Runner-up (7th place), Locus Award for Best Collection, 2021
2024	You Like It Darker	Scribner	978-1-6680-3771-3	502	

== Nonfiction ==
Overview of Stephen King non-fiction books
Year	Title	Publisher	ISBN	Pages	Notes
1981	Danse Macabre	Everest House	978-0-89696-076-3	400	Winner, Hugo Award for Best Non-Fiction Book, 1982; Winner, Locus Award for Best Related Non-Fiction Book, 1982
1988	Nightmares in the Sky	Viking Studio Books	978-0-670-82307-9	128	Illustrated by f-stop Fitzgerald
2000	On Writing: A Memoir of the Craft	Scribner	978-0-684-85352-9	288	Winner, Bram Stoker Award for Best Non-Fiction, 2001; Winner, Locus Award for Best Non-Fiction Book, 2001
2000	Secret Windows: Essays and Fiction on the Craft of Writing	BOMC	978-0-9650185-1-7	433	
2004	Faithful	Scribner	978-0-7432-6752-6	432	Written with Stewart O'Nan

== Children's books ==
Overview of Stephen King children's books
Year	Title	Publisher	ISBN	Pages	Notes
2016	Charlie the Choo-Choo	Simon & Schuster	978-1-5344-0123-5	24	Published under pseudonym Beryl Evans, illustrated by Ned Dameron
2025	Hansel and Gretel	HarperCollins (US); Hodder & Stoughton (UK)	978-0-06-264469-5 (US); 978-1-444-91934-9 (UK)	48	A children's picture book, retelling the traditional Hansel and Gretel fairy tale in collaboration with The Maurice Sendak Foundation. The illustrations by Maurice Sendak were the set and costume designs which Sendak had created for his 1998 production of Engelbert Humperdinck's opera Hänsel und Gretel.

== Graphic novels ==
Overview of Stephen King graphic novels
Year	Title	Publisher	ISBN	Note
1982	Creepshow	Plume	978-0-452-25380-3	Graphic novel, illustrated by Bernie Wrightson
2010	American Vampire Vol. 1	Vertigo	978-1-4012-2830-9	Graphic novel, co-written with Scott Snyder, Illustrated by Rafael Albuquerque; Winner, Eisner Award for Best New Series, 2011

== With the Rock Bottom Remainders ==
Overview of Rock Bottom Remainders books
Year	Title	Publisher	ISBN	Note
1994	Mid-life Confidential: The Rock Bottom Remainders Tour America with Three Chords and an Attitude	Viking Press	0-670-85234-1	Essays written by members of the charity supergroup the Rock Bottom Remainders, which included King
2013	Hard Listening: The Greatest Rock Band Ever (Of Authors) Tells All	Sam Barry Publishing	978-1-73232692-7	Essays written by members of the charity supergroup the Rock Bottom Remainders, which included King

== Screenplays/teleplays ==
Overview of Stephen King screenplays and teleplays
Year	Title	Notes
1982	Creepshow	An anthology film consisting of adaptations of five short stories (3 of which were written original for the film)
1985	Cat's Eye	An anthology horror film based on King's short stories "Quitters, Inc." and "The Ledge"
1985	Silver Bullet	A horror film based on King's novella Cycle of the Werewolf
1986	Maximum Overdrive	A comedy horror film written and directed by King, based on King's short story "Trucks"
1987	"Sorry, Right Number"	An episode of the horror anthology series Tales from the Darkside; later included in King's short story collection Nightmares & Dreamscapes
1989	Pet Sematary	A horror film based on King's novel of the same name
1991	Golden Years	An original television limited series created by King, cowritten with Josef Anderson
1992	Sleepwalkers	An original horror film
1994	The Stand	A television miniseries based on King's novel of the same name
1996	Michael Jackson's Ghosts	A musical short film with a story by King, Stan Winston, Mick Garris and Michael Jackson, based on an original concept by King and Michael Jackson
1997	The Shining	A three-episode television miniseries based on King's novel of the same name
1998	"Chinga"	An episode of the television series The X-Files, cowritten with series creator Chris Carter
1999	Storm of the Century	An original horror television miniseries. Stephen King's "novel for television."
2002	Rose Red	An original horror television miniseries
2004	Kingdom Hospital	A horror television series based on Lars von Trier's The Kingdom
2006	Desperation	A horror television film based on King's novel of the same name
2014	"Heads Will Roll"	An episode of the television series Under the Dome, based on King's novel of the same name
2014	A Good Marriage	A psychological thriller film based on King's novella of the same name
2016	Cell	A science fiction horror film based on King's novel of the same name, cowritten with Adam Alleca
2021	"The Circle Closes"	A science fiction fantasy episode of the 2020 television miniseries The Stand, based on and serving as a new ending for King's novel of the same name
2021	Lisey's Story	A fantasy horror television miniseries based on King's novel of the same name

== Others ==
Overview of miscellaneous Stephen King works
Year	Title	Publisher	ISBN	Note
1985	The Bachman Books	NAL	978-0-453-00507-4	Originally four novels, with Rage removed from later editions
1988	Bare Bones – Conversations on Terror	McGraw-Hill	978-0-07-065759-5	Collected interviews
1997	Six Stories	Philtrum Press		Limited edition (1100 copies); five of these stories reissued in Everything's Eventual (2002), one of them ("Blind Willie") reissued in Hearts in Atlantis (1999)
1999	Blood and Smoke	Simon & Schuster	978-0-671-04617-0	Original audiobook of three stories; collected in Everything's Eventual (2002)
1999	Storm of the Century	Pocket Books	978-0-671-03264-7	Original screenplay, published shortly before the initial airing
2000	The Plant	Philtrum Press		Published partially in 1982/83/85/2000; Unfinished
2009	Stephen King Goes to the Movies	Pocket Books	978-1-4165-9236-5	Contains five previously collected short stories
2010	Blockade Billy	Simon & Schuster	978-1-4516-0821-2	Contains the title short story and "Morality", both collected in The Bazaar of Bad Dreams (2015)
2013	Ghost Brothers of Darkland County	Hear Music	978-1-57940-235-8	Libretto for musical
2013	Guns	Philtrum Press		Nonfiction essay written by King on the issue of gun violence
2016	Six Scary Stories	Cemetery Dance Publications	978-1-58767-570-6	An anthology of stories picked by Stephen King (not to be mistaken with Six Stories)
2016	Hearts in Suspension	University of Maine Press	978-0-89101-127-9	A collection of essays by King with other authors
2018	Flight or Fright	Cemetery Dance Publications	978-1-58767-679-6	An anthology edited by Stephen King and Bev Vincent, and including stories from King ( "The Turbulence Expert" collected in 2024's You Like It Darker), Vincent, and Joe Hill
2024	Trapped	Cemetery Dance Publications		A chapbook with an outline and the screenplay for the 2019 short film Trapped. Stephen King and Richard Chizmar wrote the outline, Chizmar wrote the screenplay.

== See also ==
- Stephen King short fiction bibliography
- Unpublished and uncollected works by Stephen King
- List of adaptations of works by Stephen King
