= The Running Man (novel) =

1982 novel by Stephen King

- First edition cover
- Author: Stephen King (as Richard Bachman)
- Genre: Science fiction
- Publisher: Signet Books
- Publication date: May 4, 1982
- Publication place: United States
- Media type: Print (paperback)
- Pages: 219
- ISBN: 978-0-451-11508-9

The Running Man is a dystopian thriller novel by American writer Stephen King, first published under the pseudonym Richard Bachman in 1982 as a paperback original. It was collected in 1985 in the omnibus The Bachman Books. The novel is set in a dystopian United States during the year 2025, in which the nation's economy is in ruins and world violence is rising. The story follows protagonist Ben Richards as he participates in the reality show The Running Man, in which contestants win money by evading a team of hitmen sent to kill them.

The central premise of a televised manhunt was previously explored in dystopian literature, most notably in Robert Sheckley's 1958 science fiction short story, The Prize of Peril, which features a contestant hunted by professionals across an urban landscape for a cash prize.

The novel has been adapted to film twice, in 1987 and 2025.

== Plot ==
In 2025, America's economy is in chaos, and the country has become a totalitarian dystopia. Ben Richards, a desperate 28-year-old living in Co-Op City, struggles to find work after being blacklisted. His ill daughter, Cathy, needs medication, and his wife, Sheila, has resorted to prostitution to support the family. In a last-ditch effort, Richards applies to the Games, a television station that airs violent game shows as part of the government-operated Network.

After intense physical and mental evaluations, Richards is selected for The Running Man, the Network's most dangerous program. During an interview with executive producer Dan Killian, he learns the details of the contest. Contestants are declared enemies of the state and given a twelve-hour head start before Hunters—elite Network-employed assassins—are sent to kill them. They earn $100 for each hour they remain alive, an additional $100 for each Hunter or law enforcement officer they kill, and a grand prize of $1 billion for surviving thirty days. Viewers can win cash for reporting the contestant's whereabouts.

Richards receives $4,800 and a pocket video camera to start his game, and is required to mail two messages to the Network per day to earn money and avoid being hunted indefinitely. Although Killian claims no contestant has ever survived to claim the grand prize, Richards remains hopeful. He travels to Boston, pursued by Hunters, and narrowly escapes an explosion in a YMCA basement that kills five police officers. He hides in a ghetto with gang member Bradley Throckmorton, who informs him about the severe pollution and the underprivileged status of the city's poor. When Richards tries to share this knowledge in his videos, the Network censors him with obscenities and threats.

Bradley smuggles Richards past a government checkpoint into Manchester, where he provides him with a car, a gun, a new disguise and a set of mailing labels for his videotapes, leaving the Network unable to track him through their postmarks. While spending three days in Manchester disguised as a half-blind priest, Richards learns that another contestant has been killed, and dreams that Bradley has betrayed him after being tortured. He travels to a safe house in Portland, owned by a friend of Bradley's, but is reported by the owner's mother. Police and Hunters pursue Richards, wounding him, but he escapes and spends the night sleeping at an abandoned construction site.

The following day, after arranging to mail his videotapes, Richards carjacks a woman named Amelia Williams and takes her hostage. Alerting the media to his presence, he makes his way to an airport in Derry. Confronted by both police and Evan McCone, the lead Hunter, he bluffs his way onto a plane by pretending to carry an explosive charge powerful enough to destroy the facility. Having broken The Running Man's survival record of 197 hours, Richards' success sparks a revolt among the oppressed lower class against the elite, overwhelming the authorities.

Richards takes McCone and Amelia hostage, flying low to avoid being shot down. Killian calls him, revealing he knows Richards has no explosives, and offers him McCone's job. After learning that Sheila and Cathy have been dead for over ten days, Richards accepts the offer. He then kills the flight crew and McCone, sustaining a mortal wound in the process. Richards forces Amelia to jump with a parachute, then uses his remaining strength to override the plane's autopilot and fly toward the Network's headquarters.

The book ends with the plane crashing into the tower, resulting in the deaths of Richards and Killian, closing with the description: "The explosion was tremendous, lighting up the night like the wrath of God, and it rained fire twenty blocks away."

== Writer ==
The Running Man is the last of four books written by King under the pseudonym Richard Bachman before the author's real identity was leaked to the media. These are Rage (1977), The Long Walk (1979), Roadwork (1981), and The Running Man. The four novels were reissued in one volume as The Bachman Books (1985).

King created "Richard Bachman" to be his long-term alias, not just a temporary writing identity, but shortly after the publication of the fifth Bachman novel, Thinner (1984), King was outed. Although Bachman is now known to be King, he used the pen name for two further novels: The Regulators (1996) and Blaze (2007). He also based The Dark Half, a horror novel published in 1989, on Bachman's outing.

== Writing ==
King wrote the original draft of Running Man in February 1973. According to King's 2002 memoir On Writing: A Memoir of the Craft, he wrote The Running Man within a single week, compared to his normal 2,000-word or ten-page daily outputs. In "The Importance of Being Bachman", a new introduction to the 1996 edition of The Bachman Books, King describes The Running Man as "a book written by a young man who was angry, energetic, and infatuated with the art and the craft of writing". In the same introduction, King describes Ben Richards as "scrawny" and "pre-tubercular". He observes that Arnold Schwarzenegger, who played Ben Richards in the film adaptation of The Running Man, portrayed the character very differently than he wrote about him in the book, saying that Richards (in the book) was "as far away from the Arnold Schwarzenegger character in the movie as you can get".

== Film adaptations ==
The novel was adapted into a film with the same title in 1987, five years after the book was released. The adaptation only retained the general idea of the violent show and a few character names. The film stars Arnold Schwarzenegger as Richards. The film was later made into a video game released on several home computer platforms.

A second adaptation of the novel, directed by Edgar Wright and starring Glen Powell, was released in 2025. This version hews much closer to the original story.
