= The Bachman Books =

1985 collection of Stephen King novels

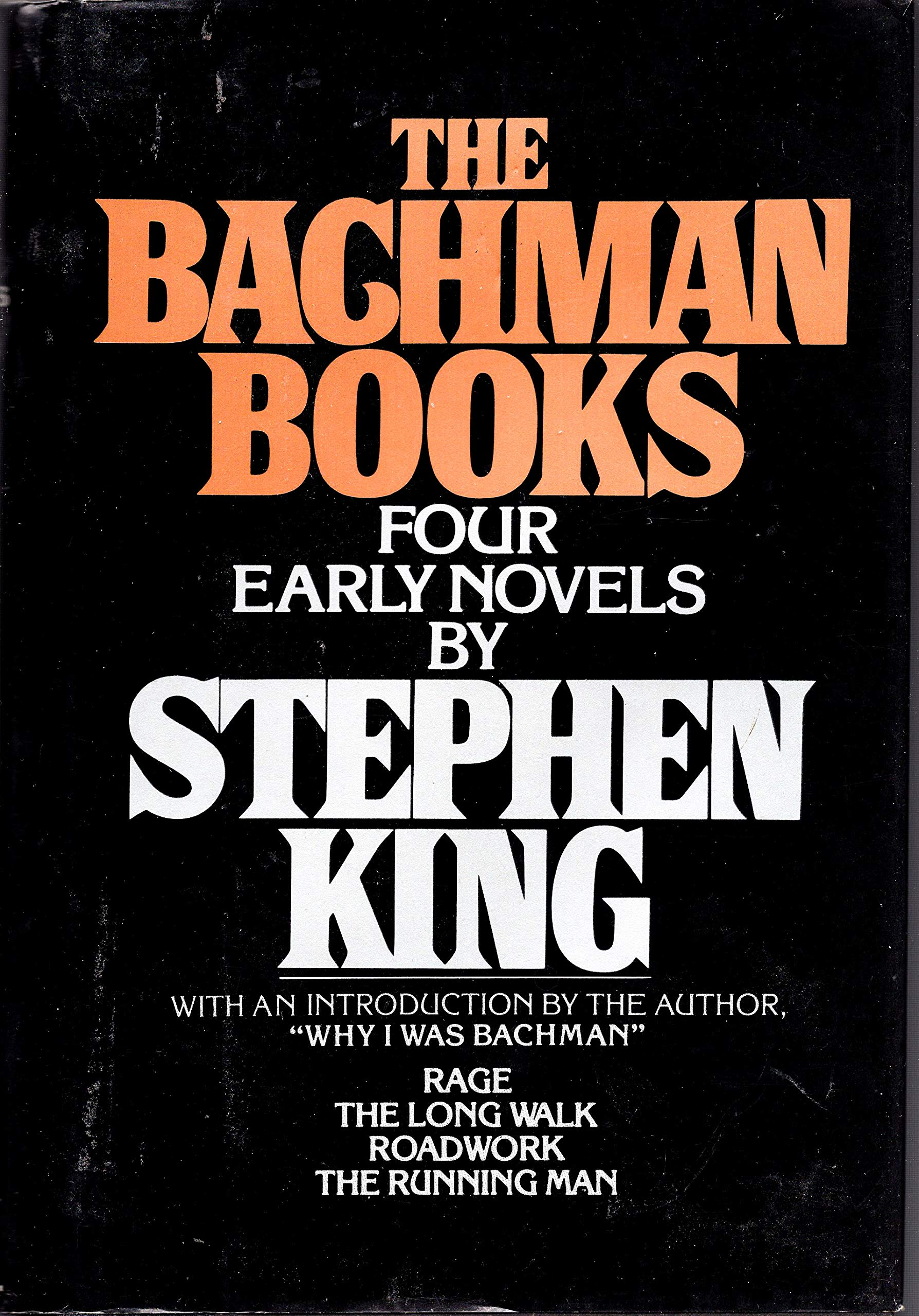
- First edition cover
- Author: Stephen King
- Language: English
- Genre: Science fiction, dystopian fiction
- Publisher: NAL
- Publication date: October 4, 1985
- Publication place: United States
- Media type: Print (Hardcover)
- Pages: 692
- ISBN: 978-0-453-00507-4

The Bachman Books is a collection of short novels by Stephen King published under the pseudonym Richard Bachman between 1977 and 1982. It made The New York Times Best Seller list upon its release in 1985.

== History ==
The book was released in 1985 after the publication of the first hardcover Bachman novel Thinner in order to introduce Bachman to fans who did not know about King's work under this pseudonym (little of which was still in circulation at the time). This omnibus also collected these early novels in hardcover for the first time, as they were all originally published in paperback. It opens with an introduction by King called "Why I Was Bachman", explaining how and why he took on the persona of Richard Bachman, as well as how it was found out by the public. Another version with a new introduction "The Importance of Being Bachman" was published in 1996 to coincide with the release of a new Bachman novel The Regulators.

== Contents ==
Novels collected in The Bachman Books:

- Rage (1977)
- The Long Walk (1979)
- Roadwork (1981)
- The Running Man (1982)

== Editions ==
The US editions of this collection and the novel Rage were taken out of print by the author and publisher in 1997. This decision was made after a wave of school shootings that were perpetrated by individuals who were allegedly influenced after having read the novel, with the 1997 Heath High School shooting being the latest incident that influenced the author's decision. The remaining three novels are still in print and are published as separate books.

The Bachman Books is still in print in the United Kingdom although it no longer contains Rage. In a footnote to the preface of the more recent Bachman novel Blaze (dated 30 January 2007), King wrote of Rage: "Now out of print, and a good thing." King elaborated on his decision to allow Rage to go out of print in his 2013 essay, Guns.
