= Never Look Behind You =

Short story by Stephen King

- Short story by Chris Chesley and Stephen King
- Country: United States
- Language: English
- Genre: Horror short story

Publication
- Published in: People, Places and Things
- Publication type: Anthology
- Publisher: Triad Publishing
- Media type: Print
- Publication date: 1960

"Never Look Behind You" is a short story by Chris Chesley and Stephen King. It was self-published by Chesley and King in 1960 as part of the collection People, Places and Things.

== Plot summary ==
An "old miser" and "usurer" named George Jacobs is counting money in his office when an elderly, scar-faced woman dressed in rags enters behind him. As Jacobs finishes counting, the woman tells him "too bad you won't be able to spend it". After Jacobs turns around to confront the woman, she raises her hand, killing Jacobs with "a flash of fire on his throat".

Following Jacobs' death, an unnamed character queries what killed him, while another states that he is glad that Jacobs is dead. The latter character is described as "lucky" as "he didn't look behind him".

== Publication ==
"Never Look Behind You" was written by Chesley and King in the summer before beginning high school. It was self-published in 1960 as part of the short story collection People, Places and Things, which was mimeographed in King's family basement by Chesley and King.

== Reception ==
Rocky Wood describes People, Places and Things as "juvenilia" but with "clear hints of the King to come". Reviewing "Never Look Behind You", Wood comments that "it is the punch line that makes the story." Michael R. Collings states, "In approach, content, theme, and treatment [the stories] clearly suggest directions the mature King would explore in greater detail...". Tyson Blue describes "Never Look Behind You" as "an intriguing little tale not so much for what it says as what it does not say". Stephen J. Spignesi notes similarities between the character of the old woman and the character Taduz Lemke from King's 1984 book Thinner.

== See also ==
- Stephen King short fiction bibliography
