= The Regulators =

The Regulators may refer to:

- The Regulators (novel), a novel written by Stephen King under the pseudonym 'Richard Bachman'. Known as the sister book to King's novel Desperation
- The Lincoln County Regulators, a posse led by notorious Old West outlaw Billy the Kid in the 1870s
- The Regulators of the Regulator Insurrection in North Carolina, 1766-1771
