= Rage (King novel) =

1977 Stephen King novel

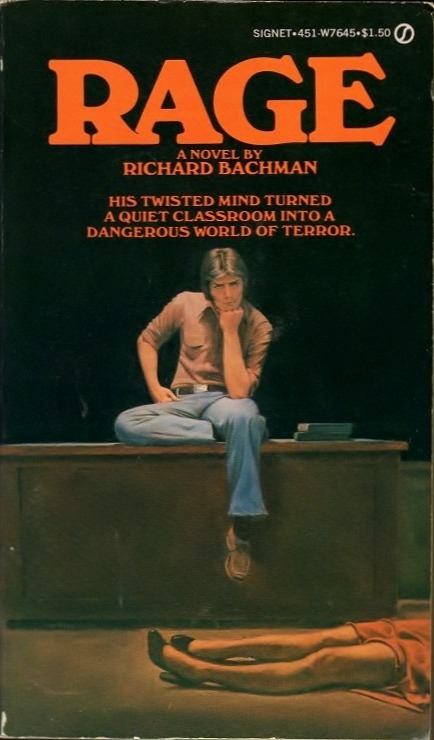
- First edition cover
- Author: Stephen King (as Richard Bachman)
- Language: English
- Genre: Psychological thriller
- Publisher: Signet Books
- Publication date: September 13, 1977
- Publication place: United States
- Media type: Print (paperback)
- Pages: 211
- ISBN: 978-0-451-07645-8

Rage (written as Getting It On) (Note: The title was changed before publication.) is a psychological thriller novel by American writer Stephen King, the first published under the pseudonym Richard Bachman. It was published in 1977 and then collected in the 1985 hardcover omnibus The Bachman Books. The novel describes a school shooting, and was associated with several real-life high school shooting incidents in the 1980s and 1990s. In response, particularly to the 1997 Heath High School shooting, King decided to pull the story from the Bachman collection.

In 2013, in the wake of the Sandy Hook Elementary School shooting, King published the anti-firearms violence essay Guns.

== Summary ==
In May 1976, Charlie Decker, a high school senior in Placerville, Maine, is called to a meeting with his principal about the cause of his suspension two months earlier—an incident in which he struck his chemistry teacher with a pipe wrench, leading to the teacher's hospitalization. After repeatedly insulting the principal, he is expelled.

Storming out of the office, Charlie retrieves a pistol from his locker and sets its other contents on fire. Returning to his classroom, he fatally shoots his algebra teacher. The fire triggers an alarm, but Charlie forces his classmates to stay in the room, killing a history teacher when he attempts to enter. As the school evacuates, the police and media arrive.

Over the following four hours, Charlie toys with the authority figures' attempt at negotiation, including the principal, the school psychologist, and the local police chief. Charlie gives them certain commands, threatening to kill students if they do not comply. Charlie admits to his hostages that he does not know what has compelled him to commit his deeds, believing he will regret them when the standoff is over. As his fellow students start identifying with Charlie, he unwittingly turns the class into an impromptu psychotherapy group, causing the participants to semi-voluntarily tell embarrassing secrets regarding themselves and each other.

Interspersed throughout are flashbacks to Charlie's troubled childhood, particularly his tumultuous relationship with his abusive father Carl. As the standoff proceeds, a police sniper attempts to shoot Charlie through the heart. He survives because he has placed the combination lock from his locker in the breast pocket of his shirt.

Charlie finally realizes that only one student is really being held against his will: "Big Man on Campus" Ted Jones, who is harboring his own secrets. Ted also realizes this and attempts to escape the classroom, but the other students brutally assault him. Charlie eventually releases the students except for Ted, who is in a catatonic state. When the police chief enters the classroom, the now-unarmed Charlie feigns reaching for his pistol, leading the chief to shoot him. Charlie survives the shooting and, in August 1976, is declared insane and committed to a psychiatric hospital in Augusta.

The final chapters contain an interoffice memo regarding Ted's treatment and prognosis at the hospital where he is now a patient, and a letter from one of Charlie's friends describing developments in the students' lives in the months following this incident. The story ends with an unidentified narrator (either Charlie or Ted) addressing the reader: "That's the end. I have to turn off the light now. Good night."

== Connections to actual school shootings ==
The plot of Rage vaguely resembles actual high school shootings and incidents of hostage-taking that have happened since its publication. As a result, King became uncomfortable with the idea of having it remain in print, for fear that it might inspire further such occurrences. The novel has been associated with several events:

- Jeffrey Lyne Cox, a senior at San Gabriel High School in San Gabriel, California, took a semi-automatic rifle to school on April 26, 1988, and held a humanities class of about 60 students hostage for over 30 minutes. Cox held the gun to one student when the teacher doubted Cox would cause harm and stated that he would prove it to her. At that time three students escaped out a rear door and were fired upon. Cox was later tackled and disarmed by another student. A friend of Cox told the press that Cox had been inspired by the Kuwait Airways Flight 422 hijacking and by the novel Rage, which Cox had read over and over again and with which he strongly identified.
- Dustin L. Pierce, a senior at Jackson County High School in McKee, Kentucky, armed himself with a shotgun and two handguns and took a history classroom hostage in a nine-hour standoff with police on September 18, 1989, that ended without injury. Police found a copy of Rage among the possessions in Pierce's bedroom, leading to speculation that he had been inspired by the novel.
- On September 11, 1991, Ryan R. Harris walked into a math class at Stevens High School in Rapid City, South Dakota, pulled out a sawed-off shotgun, and ordered the teacher to leave. The teacher complied and Harris held the rest of the class hostage for the next four hours. Harris had been inspired by Stephen King's novella Rage. Harris demanded pizza and cigarettes, which were delivered, and $1 million and a helicopter, which were not. He fired a total of 10 shots in the room, at objects such as the overhead projector and intercom. No students or faculty were injured or killed. Upon receiving the cigarettes he had demanded, Harris set down his shotgun to pull out a lighter and light his cigarette. In this moment 17-year-old senior Chris Ericks picked up the shotgun and police swarmed in, bringing the standoff to an end.
- On January 18, 1993, Scott Pennington, a student at East Carter High School in Grayson, Kentucky, took a .38-caliber revolver that was owned by his father and fatally shot his English teacher Deanna McDavid in the head during her seventh-period class. He subsequently shot and killed the school's custodian Marvin Hicks and held the class hostage for 20 minutes before releasing them. Just before the shooting, he had written an essay on Rage and was upset that McDavid had given it a C grade.
- In December 1997, Michael Carneal shot eight fellow students, three of them fatally, at a prayer meeting at Heath High School in West Paducah, Kentucky. He had a copy of Rage in his locker as part of the Richard Bachman omnibus. This was the incident that moved King to allow the book to go out of print.
- One school shooting was compared to Rage due to inaccurate reporting. Barry Loukaitis, a student at Frontier Middle School in Moses Lake, Washington, walked from his house to the school on February 2, 1996, and entered his algebra classroom during fifth period. He opened fire on students, killing two and wounding another. He then fatally shot his algebra teacher Leona Caires in the chest. As his classmates' shock turned to panic, Loukaitis reportedly said, "This sure beats algebra, doesn't it?"—a line erroneously reported to be from Rage. (No such line appears in King's story. The closest is when Charlie Decker quips, "This sure beats panty raids.") However, subsequently, Stephen King in his essay "Guns" wrote that it was a quote from the novel. Upon hearing the gunshots, gym coach Jon Lane entered the classroom. Loukaitis was holding his classmates hostage and planned to keep one hostage to safely exit the school. Lane volunteered to be the hostage, and Loukaitis kept Lane at gunpoint with his rifle. Lane grabbed the weapon from Loukaitis, wrestled him to the ground, and then assisted the evacuation of students.

== End of publication ==
When King decided to let Rage fall out of print in the United States, it remained available only as part of The Bachman Books. In contrast, the other novels that appeared in that compilation—The Long Walk, Roadwork, and The Running Man—are available separately in the US. Rage remained available in the United Kingdom and other countries in The Bachman Books for a time, but later appeared to become unavailable. New editions of The Bachman Books do not include Rage. In a footnote to the preface of the novel Blaze, dated January 30, 2007, King wrote of Rage: "Now out of print, and a good thing."

King said, in his keynote address at the VEMA Annual Meeting on May 26, 1999: "The Carneal incident was enough for me. I asked my publisher to take the damned thing out of print. They concurred." King went on to describe his view on this subject, which acknowledged the role that cultural or artistic products such as Rage play in influencing individuals, particularly troubled youths, while also declaring that artists and writers should not be denied the aesthetic opportunity to draw upon their own culture—which is suffused with violence, according to King—in their work. King went on to describe his inspiration for stories such as Rage, which drew heavily upon his own frustrations and pains as a high school student.

In an article on the ominous writings of Virginia Tech shooter Seung-Hui Cho for Entertainment Weekly, King said: "Certainly in this sensitized day and age, my own college writing—including a short story called 'Cain Rose Up' and the novel Rage—would have raised red flags, and I'm certain someone would have tabbed me as mentally ill because of them..." After the Sandy Hook Elementary School shooting, he elaborated in a non-fiction essay, titled "Guns" (2013), on why he let Rage go out of print. King's website states: "All profits from 'Guns' will benefit the Brady Campaign to Prevent Gun Violence." While many of King's novels have been adapted for the screen, he has voiced his opposition to Rage getting any adaptation due to its subject matter.
