= The Hotel at the End of the Road =

Short story by Stephen King

- Short story by Stephen King
- Country: United States
- Language: English
- Genre: Horror short story

Publication
- Published in: People, Places and Things
- Publication type: Anthology
- Publisher: Triad Publishing
- Media type: Print
- Publication date: 1960

"The Hotel at the End of the Road" is a short story by Stephen King. It was self-published by King in 1960 as part of the collection People, Places and Things.

== Plot summary ==
The story opens with two criminals, Kelso Black and Tommy Riviera, being pursued by the police. After evading the police by turning down a gravel road, Black and Riviera see an old hotel ahead and decide to stay there. After Riviera threatens an elderly man at reception at gunpoint, they are directed to room five of the hotel. Upon waking up the following morning, Riviera finds he is paralyzed; he sees the elderly man inject a needle into Black's arm. The story ends with the elderly man informing Black and Riviera that they are being added to his museum of "living mummies".

== Publication ==
"The Hotel at the End of the Road" was written by King in the summer before beginning high school. It was self-published in 1960 as part of the short story collection People, Places and Things. King submitted the story to the literary magazine Flip but the magazine ceased publication before printing the story. "The Hotel at the End of the Road" was republished in 1993 in the fourth edition of Market Guide for Young Writers by Kathy Henderson and again in 1996 in the fifth edition. The character of Kelso Black reappeared in "The Stranger" (another short story within People, Places and Things) and again in King's 2018 work The Outsider.

== Reception ==
Rocky Wood describes "The Hotel at the End of the Road" as "as derivative as one could expect from an early teenage writer". Stephen J. Spignesi states "there really isn't too much in the way of plot development in this story, and there are a few unanswered questions [...] But, again, for all its flaws, we can't help but be amazed by the sophisticated narrative and the sheer unstoppable story-telling powers of Stephen King at such an early age". Spignesi further suggests that "the hotel seems to foretell King's later masterful use of haunted places, especially the Overlook Hotel (from The Shining) and the Marsten House (from 'Salem's Lot)"

== See also ==
- The Landlady (short story)
- Stephen King short fiction bibliography
