= The End Times =

Novel by Benjamin Percy and Stephen King

- Author: Benjamin Percy; Stephen King (as Claudia Inez Bachman)
- Language: English
- Genre: Post-apocalyptic fiction, Horror
- Publisher: Bad Hand Books
- Publication date: November 19, 2025 – late 2026; March 9, 2027 (collected edition)
- Publication place: United States

The End Times is an ongoing serialized epistolary novel by Benjamin Percy and Stephen King (writing as Claudia Inez Bachman, the fictional widow of King's pseudonym Richard Bachman), which began publishing in newspaper format (in limited-edition print and digital) by Bad Hand Books in November 2025 and is scheduled to run with 12 monthly issues through late 2026. A collected edition in standard hardcover format is planned to be published in early 2027 as The End Times: Volume One, with additional content.

== Background ==
The project was originally announced and discussed by Percy on the July 16, 2025 episode of The Kingcast, presented by Fangoria. The setting for the novel is related to King's novel The Stand (1978). With each purchase of the initial digital monthly issue, one dollar is being donated to the ACLU. For the collected edition, one dollar from the proceeds will be donated to Neighbors Helping Neighbors, a mutual aid organization based in Minneapolis, assisting residents in the aftermath of the ICE occupation of Minneapolis.

== Publication ==
The initial limited edition newspaper issues are being published by an actual newspaper printing press by the Ortonville Independent in Ortonville, Minnesota.
