= People, Places and Things (short story collection) =

1960 work co-authored by Stephen King

- Author: Chris Chesley; Stephen King
- Language: English
- Genre: Horror, science fiction
- Publisher: Triad Publishing
- Publication date: 1960
- Publication place: United States
- Media type: Print

People, Places and Things is a short story collection by Chris Chesley and Stephen King, self-published in 1960.

== Contents ==
Title	Author
"The Hotel at the End of the Road"	Stephen King
"Genius"	Chris Chesley
"Top Forty, News, Weather and Sports"	Chris Chesley
"Bloody Child"	Chris Chesley
"I've Got to Get Away!"	Stephen King
"The Dimension Warp"	Stephen King
"The Thing at the Bottom of the Well"	Stephen King
"Reward"	Chris Chesley
"The Stranger"	Stephen King
"A Most Unusual Thing"	Chris Chesley
"Gone"	Chris Chesley
"They've Gone"	Chris Chesley
"I'm Falling"	Stephen King
"The Cursed Expedition"	Stephen King
"The Other Side of the Fog"	Stephen King
"Scared"	Chris Chesley
"Curiousity [sic] Killed the Cat"	Chris Chesley
"Never Look Behind You"	Chris Chesley and Stephen King

== Publication ==
People, Places and Things was written by Chris Chesley and Stephen King in the summer before beginning high school. It was self-published in 1960 under the name of "Triad Publishing" using King's brother's small printing press and handbound. King estimates that only 10 copies were printed. Copies were sold to school friends for about $0.10 to $0.25 each. A second print run was issued in 1963. The only known extant copy of People, Places and Things is held by King; it has been described as "a one-of-a-kind King collectible" and as "the rarest piece of Stephen King material in existence".

In the early-1960s, King rewrote "I've Got to Get Away!" and retitled it "The Killer". He submitted "The Killer" to Forrest J Ackerman for the magazine Spacemen; it was the first story he submitted for publication. While not accepted at the time, the story was later published in issue #202 of Famous Monsters of Filmland in spring 1994 with an introduction by Ackerman.

"The Hotel at the End of the Road" was republished in 1993 in the fourth edition of Market Guide for Young Writers by Kathy Henderson and again in 1996 in the fifth edition.

== Reception ==
Rocky Wood describes People, Places and Things as "juvenilia" but with "clear hints of the King to come". Michael R. Collings states, "In approach, content, theme, and treatment [the stories] clearly suggest directions the mature King would explore in greater detail". Tyson Blue notes that People, Places and Things "cannot be held up to the same critical standards as [King's] later published short stories and novels" but nonetheless notes some merit in the work, stating that "a reading of these stories [...] shows that even at an early age, King's interests and inspirations were already at work [...] he was already assimilating the work of other writers", and describing "Never Look Behind You" (a collaboration between King and Chris Chesley) as "an intriguing little tale".

== See also ==
- Stephen King short fiction bibliography
