= Guns (essay) =

Essay by Stephen King

- Author: Stephen King
- Language: English
- Publisher: Philtrum Press
- Publication date: January 25, 2013
- Publication place: United States
- Media type: E-book

"Guns" is a non-fiction essay written by American writer Stephen King on the issue of gun violence, published in 2013.

He wrote it after the 2012 Sandy Hook Elementary School shooting, elaborating on why he let the novel Rage (1977) and The Bachman Books (1985), the omnibus in which Rage also appeared, go out of print. In the essay, King calls on gun owners to support a ban on assault weapons.

On January 25, 2013, the essay was published as a Kindle Single, and on February 11, 2013, "Guns" was released as an audiobook narrated by Christian Rummel. King's official website states, "All profits from 'Guns' will benefit the Brady Campaign to Prevent Gun Violence."

== See also ==
- Stephen King bibliography
