= Dreamcatcher (novel) =

2001 novel by Stephen King

- First edition cover
- Author: Stephen King
- Cover artist: Cliff Nielsen
- Language: English
- Genre: Science fiction
- Publisher: Scribner
- Publication date: March 20, 2001
- Publication place: United States
- Media type: Print (Hardcover and Paperback)
- Pages: 620
- ISBN: 978-0-7432-1138-3

Dreamcatcher is a 2001 science fiction horror novel by American writer Stephen King, featuring elements of body horror, suspense and alien invasion. The book, written in longhand, helped the author recuperate from a 1999 car crash, and was completed in half a year. According to the author in his afterword, the working title was Cancer. His wife, Tabitha King, persuaded him to change the title. A film adaptation was released in 2003.

King has since soured on the book, as, in 2014, he told Rolling Stone that "I don't like Dreamcatcher very much," and also stated that the book was written under the influence of Oxycontin, which he was on to control the pain from his crash.

== Plot summary ==
Set near the fictional town of Derry, Maine, Dreamcatcher is the story of four lifelong friends: Gary "Jonesy" Jones, Pete Moore, Joe "Beaver" Clarendon and Henry Devlin. As young teenagers, the four saved Douglas "Duddits" Cavell, an older boy with Down syndrome, from a group of sadistic bullies. From their new friendship with Duddits, Jonesy, Beaver, Henry and Pete began to share the boy's unusual powers, including telepathy, shared dreaming and seeing "the line," a psychic trace left by the movement of human beings.

Jonesy, Beaver, Henry and Pete reunite for their annual hunting trip at the Hole-in-the-Wall, an isolated lodge in the Jefferson Tract. There, they unwittingly become caught between an alien invasion and an insane retired Air Force colonel, Abraham Kurtz. Jonesy and Beaver, who remain at the cabin while Henry and Pete go out for supplies, encounter Richard McCarthy, a disoriented and delirious stranger wandering near the lodge during a blizzard talking about lights in the sky. The victim of an alien abduction, McCarthy grows sicker and dies while sitting on the toilet. An extraterrestrial parasite eats its way out of his anus, after gestating in his bowel, and attacks the two men, killing Beaver. Jonesy inhales the spores of the strange reddish fungus that the stranger and his parasite have spread around the cabin, and an alien entity ("Mr. Gray") takes over his mind.

On the return trip from their supply run, Henry and Pete encounter a woman from the same hunting party as McCarthy. She is also delirious and infected with a parasite. After crashing their car, Henry leaves Pete with the woman and attempts to return to the cabin by foot. From there, his telepathic senses let him know that Pete is in trouble, Beaver is dead and Jonesy is no longer Jonesy. Mr. Gray, manipulating Jonesy's body, is attempting to leave the area. The aliens have attempted to infect Earth multiple times, beginning with the Roswell incident in 1947, but environmental factors have always stopped them, and the U.S. government has covered up the failed invasion attempts every time. With the infection of Jonesy, who can contain the alien within his mind and also spread the infection, Mr. Gray has become the perfect Typhoid Mary—and he knows it. Mr. Gray hijacks a truck transporting a spore-filled alien corpse while Jonesy, trapped inside a mental stronghold, is powerless to stop him.

It becomes up to Henry—by now a quarantined prisoner of the Army—to convince the military to go after Jonesy/Mr. Gray before it's too late. Jonesy himself, now a prisoner in his own mind, tries to help. Both of them are convinced that their old friend Duddits may be the key to saving the world. Using telepathic powers gained from the alien fungus, Henry alerts Army officer Owen Underhill of a plan by Kurtz to kill most of the Army personnel to maintain secrecy. The two stage an escape by telepathically inciting a riot among other prisoners, destroying the base in the process. As they flee, the pair is closely pursued by a vengeful Kurtz along with his subordinates Freddy and Perlmutter. Perlmutter is infected with a telepathic parasite and is being used to track Owen and Mr. Gray down, despite his personal reluctance and pain.

Owen and Henry follow Jonesy/Mr. Gray to Derry and along the way share their childhood memories, including a time when Duddits and his friends tracked down a missing girl. They unite with Duddits, who is very sick with leukemia. After a tear-filled goodbye with Duddits' mother, the trio use Duddits' powers to follow Jonesy/Mr. Gray southward to Quabbin Reservoir. Mr. Gray intends to infect the local water supply using a dog he has infected with the spores, giving it a parasite. Jonesy is able to slow down Mr. Gray's progress considerably by getting the presence to strongly crave bacon, which it eats raw after obtaining it from a convenience store. The uncooked meat greatly sickens Jonesy's body, giving the trio just enough time to catch up and confront Mr. Gray at the reservoir.

Using the last of his powers, Duddits helps Henry and Jonesy mentally overcome Mr. Gray as well as help Owen shoot the parasite that emerges from the dog. Duddits dies from the effort but has prevented Mr. Gray's plans. Kurtz and his men arrive, leaving the infected soldier in their vehicle. They ambush and fatally shoot Owen, but Kurtz is killed by Freddy, who fears that Kurtz will shoot him next. Freddy flees, returning to their vehicle, but is killed by the parasite that was growing inside the now-deceased Perlmutter's body. Exhausted and half-insane, Henry sets the vehicle on fire by shooting its gas tank, destroying the last of the alien presence on earth. He reunites with Jonesy, who passes out from exhaustion.

Months later, Jonesy and Henry reminisce about their time in an underground military compound where they were held following the events at the reservoir. It is revealed that Jonesy was immune to the alien fungus all along, and Mr. Gray was only able to take over his mind because he believed it could—the idea being caught as in a dreamcatcher.

== Reception ==
Kirkus Reviews described the novel as "[t]op suspense with a surreal climax you'd have to read twice." Publishers Weekly stated:

The book has flaws, then, and each of them cries "runaway author." Is anyone editing King these days? [...] The genius shines through in any case, in the images and conceits that blind with brilliance, in the magnificent architecture, in the wide swaths of flat-out riveting reading and, most of all, in the wellsprings of emotions King taps as he plumbs the ties that bind his characters and, by extension, all of us to one another.

== See also ==
- Dreamcatcher (film)
- Stephen King bibliography
