= 1997 Heath High School shooting =

Mass shooting in West Paducah, Kentucky

- Heath High School (the United States) Heath High School (Kentucky)
- Location: 37.0790°N 88.7944°W; West Paducah, Kentucky, U.S.
- Date: December 1, 1997; 28 years ago 7:45 a.m. (CST)
- Attack type: School shooting, mass shooting, triple-murder
- Weapon: Ruger MK II .22-caliber pistol
- Deaths: 3
- Injuries: 6
- Perpetrator: Michael Adam Carneal
- Motive: Inconclusive
- Litigation: Lawsuit against two Internet pornography sites, several computer game companies and makers and distributors of the 1994 film Natural Born Killers and the 1995 film The Basketball Diaries by the victims' families.

The Heath High School shooting occurred at Heath High School in West Paducah, Kentucky, on December 1, 1997, when 14-year-old Michael Carneal opened fire on a group of students, killing three and injuring six.

== Shooting ==
On December 1, 1997, Carneal wrapped a shotgun and a rifle in a blanket and took them to school, passing them off as an art project he was working on. He carried a loaded Ruger MK II .22-caliber pistol in his backpack. Carneal rode to school with his sister and arrived at approximately 7:45 a.m. When he arrived, he inserted earplugs into his ears and took the pistol out of his bag. He fired ten rounds in fast succession at a student prayer group. Three girls later died and six other students were wounded.

Brittney Thomas, a survivor, said that when she turned around during the shooting, she was "kind of facing down the barrel of the gun."

A member of the group, Benjamin Strong, testified that Carneal dropped the gun of his own accord after the shooting. Carneal placed his pistol on the ground and surrendered to the school principal, Bill Bond. After dropping the gun, Carneal said to Strong: "Kill me, please. I can't believe I did that."

== Victims ==
=== Killed ===
- Nicole Hadley was a fourteen-year-old freshman who played in the school band and on the freshman basketball team. She was kept alive until 10:00 pm the evening of the shooting. Her family had moved to Paducah from Nebraska the year before. Her parents were praised for donating her organs. President Bill Clinton cited this "courageous decision" in his Proclamation 7083 on National Organ and Tissue Donor Awareness Week in 1998.
- Jessica James was a seventeen-year-old senior and member of the marching band. She died in surgery at Western Baptist Hospital the afternoon of the shooting.
- Kayce Steger was a fifteen-year-old sophomore, a clarinetist in the school band and a member of the Agape Club and softball team. She died at Lourdes Hospital in Paducah about 45 minutes after the shooting. She was an honor student and member of Law Enforcement Explorers Post 111 who hoped to be a police officer.

=== Wounded ===
- Shelley Schaberg, 17, was described by the principal as the school's best female athlete. Voted Miss Heath High School by the senior class, Shelley was homecoming queen. Although her injuries from the shooting prevented her from playing basketball, her college honored her basketball scholarship and she went on to play college soccer.
- Melissa "Missy" Jenkins, 15, was president of the Future Homemakers of America. She was paralyzed from the chest down after being shot. She has appeared on numerous national and local television shows, talked to newspaper reporters and appeared in two TV commercials for Channel One News, an educational channel that reaches schools throughout the country. A video interview of her was featured on the homepage of YouTube.com on April 22, 2007.
- Mandy Jenkins, 15, was the twin sister of Melissa Jenkins. A bullet grazed her neck.
- Kelly Hard Alsip, 16, was a member of the softball team and the Future Homemakers of America. She transferred to the local Catholic school the year after the shooting.
- Hollan Holm, 14, was a member of the Academic Team, the Spanish Club, and the Science Olympiad. He had been shot in the side of the head, which left a gash and required 13 staples to shut, but he had no permanent physical complications or brain damage. In his valedictory speech at the class of 2001 graduation, he reminded his class that they had lost not one but two class members on December 1, 1997: Nicole Hadley and Michael Carneal. Holm has been involved with an organization that urges students to speak up if they know of threats against schools or students.
- Craig Keene, 15, was a member of the Agape Club, the band, and the basketball team.

== Perpetrator ==
Michael Carneal
- Born: Michael Adam Carneal; June 1, 1983 (age 43)
- Parent: John Adam Carneal (Father) Ann Adam Carneal (Mother)
- Status: Incarcerated
- Convictions: Murder (3 counts); Attempted murder First degree burglary
- Penalty: 3 life sentences with possibility of parole after 25 years (parole denied in 2022; sentence to be served out)

Michael Adam Carneal was a 14-year-old freshman at the time of the shooting. Carneal told reporters that he could not give a single explanation for his crimes, and that contributing factors included a mistaken belief of his that his parents did not love him, bullying from classmates, and false claims he was gay. He stated that he did not know who he was aiming at until he read the names in the paper.

Weeks before the incident, Carneal had stolen a .38 caliber handgun from his parents' room and attempted to sell it. A student took the gun, threatening to tell police if Carneal did not give it to him. Carneal had told students that "something big is going to happen on Monday" but no one took him seriously.

In the weeks before the shooting, Carneal stole several firearms from both his own home and a neighbor's home.

On the afternoon of Thanksgiving Day, Carneal went to his neighbor's home and broke into the garage, taking four .22 rifles, a 30-30 rifle, .22 and 12 gauge ammunition and earplugs.

Later, he stole a Ruger .22 pistol and several .22 magazines.

Presumably sometime after Thanksgiving, Carneal stole two shotguns from his father's closet and hid them under his bed.

=== Mental illness ===
According to reports, Carneal had been bullied by other students and had anxiety, depression, and severe paranoia. His paranoia was manifested in habits such as covering up vents and windows while in bathrooms, because he believed he was being watched. Following the shooting, Carneal was diagnosed with schizotypal personality disorder and dysthymia. Kathleen O'Connor, who treated Carneal while he was incarcerated at the Northern Kentucky Youth Development Center, initially agreed with this diagnosis but later determined that Carneal had paranoid schizophrenia.

Dewey Cornell and Diane Schetky, who evaluated Carneal after the shooting, later changed their diagnosis to schizophrenia. He has been hospitalized several times since the start of his incarceration due to psychosis, and takes the anti-depressant Zoloft and Geodon, an anti-psychotic used to treat schizophrenia.

=== Stephen King ===
Carneal had in his locker at the time a copy of Stephen King's novel Rage, first published in 1977 under the pseudonym Richard Bachman. After this shooting, King requested his publisher to allow it to go out of print, fearing that it might inspire similar tragedies. Rage for a time continued to be available in the United Kingdom in The Bachman Books collection, although the collection now no longer contains Rage.

== Trial ==
In October 1998, a guilty plea from Carneal was accepted due to his mental illness. Under a plea arrangement, the judge agreed to accept the pleas on condition that Carneal would receive a life sentence with the possibility of parole in 25 years (2022). According to prosecutor Tim Kaltenbach, the plea allows Carneal to receive mental health treatment during imprisonment as long as this is necessary for him or until he is released.

Carneal was transported to the Kentucky State Reformatory in La Grange when he turned 18 where he remains. Prior to that he was held in at Northern Kentucky Youth Development Center, a Kentucky Department of Juvenile Justice facility in Crittenden. Carneal's Kentucky Department of Corrections (KDOC) ID is 151127. Carneal began serving time with KDOC on June 1, 2001.

In 2007, Carneal filed an appeal claiming that he was too mentally ill to plead guilty to the shooting at Heath High School. He asked the Kentucky Supreme Court for a re-trial. Prosecutors appealed and the Kentucky Supreme Court rejected his request.

In 2012, he attempted to withdraw his plea claiming he was mentally ill at the time he made it. Later in the year the U.S. 6th Circuit Court of Appeals denied the request, stating he should have acted sooner. He was originally scheduled to be eligible for parole on November 16, 2022. However, his hearing was rescheduled and began on September 19, 2022.

=== Parole denial ===
On September 26, 2022, the parole board unanimously denied Carneal's bid for parole and ordered him to serve out the remainder of his life sentence. The "serve out" ruling, under Kentucky law, means the inmate in question cannot be considered for any future parole hearings (though commutation or a pardon from the governor is still possible). This means Carneal's life with parole sentence is now effectively a life without parole (or "whole life") sentence.

=== Settlement for families ===
The families of the deceased have agreed to a $42 million settlement from Carneal. At the time of settlement, Carneal had no assets, and his family's insurance company, Kentucky Farm Bureau, has insisted repeatedly through court motions that it is not liable for his actions.

== Lawsuit ==
In early 1999, the parents of three victims represented by Jack Thompson filed a $33 million lawsuit against two Internet pornography sites, several computer game companies and makers and distributors of the 1994 film Natural Born Killers and the 1995 film The Basketball Diaries. They claimed that media violence inspired Carneal and therefore should be held responsible for the deaths that occurred. Both Thompson and United States Attorney General John Ashcroft claimed Carneal's proficient marksmanship was due to practice in violent video games. The case was dismissed in 2002, with the 6th U.S. Circuit Court of Appeals ruling that it was "simply too far a leap from shooting characters on a video screen to shooting people in a classroom."

== Memorials ==
Family of victims organized a 20th anniversary service to commemorate the victims, and open a memorial for the victims placed across the street from the school. The memorial was built in a circle to symbolize the prayer circle that was targeted, with five benches representing the five surviving victims.

== See also ==
- List of school shootings in the United States by death toll
- 2018 Marshall County High School shooting, which occurred about 28 miles (45 km) away
- List of class-action lawsuits
