= Rose Madder (novel) =

1995 novel by Stephen King

- First edition cover
- Author: Stephen King
- Language: English
- Genre: Horror/Fantasy
- Publisher: Viking
- Publication date: July 10, 1995
- Publication place: United States
- Media type: Print (Hardcover)
- Pages: 420
- ISBN: 978-0-670-85869-9

Rose Madder is a horror/fantasy novel by American writer Stephen King published in 1995. It deals with the effects of domestic violence (which King had touched upon before in the novels It, Insomnia, Dolores Claiborne, Needful Things, and many others) and, unusually for a King novel, brings in several fantastic elements from Greek mythology. In his memoir, On Writing, King states that Rose Madder and Insomnia are "stiff, trying-too-hard novels."

== Plot ==
In 1985, police officer Norman Daniels brutally beats his wife Rosie while she is four months pregnant, resulting in a miscarriage. She wants to leave him but dismisses the idea as impossible; Norman specializes in finding missing people and she has neither family nor friends to help her escape. The short-tempered Norman is then accused of raping a Black woman named Wendy Yarrow and becomes increasingly volatile during the following lawsuit and internal affairs investigation.

Nine years later, Rosie notices a drop of blood on the couple's bedsheet and realizes she fears continuing to live a life of misery and abuse with Norman more than being murdered. She steals her husband's debit card and flees, boarding a bus to an unnamed Midwestern city. When she arrives she meets a good-natured man named Peter Slowik who guides her to a local women's shelter, where the shelter manager, Anna Stevenson, helps Rosie find a small apartment and a job as a hotel maid. A few weeks later, Rosie decides to pawn her engagement ring but finds that the ring's "diamond" is fake. In the pawnshop, her attention is drawn to a painting of a woman in a rose madder gown. Fascinated, she trades her ring for it.

On the street, Rosie is stopped by Rob Lefferts, a customer at the pawnshop who likes her voice and wants to offer her a job recording audiobooks. Shortly thereafter, Bill Steiner, the pawnshop owner, asks Rosie out on a date. As her life opens up and improves, she notices that the painting gradually expanding and changing as well. One day, without fully understanding how, she manages to travel through the painting and is met on the other side by a woman named Dorcas, who resembles Wendy Yarrow, and the woman in the painting, whom she calls "Rose Madder". Rose Madder asks Rosie to rescue her baby from an underground labyrinth guarded by the blind, one-eyed bull Erinyes. Dorcas leads Rosie to the temple grounds and warns her of the dangers that await, informing her that she (Dorcas) cannot enter the labyrinth due to a mysterious illness that afflicts both her and her mistress. Rosie enters the temple alone, unsure if anything she is experiencing is real, and manages to save the child, whom she names Caroline. Rose Madder cryptically promises “to repay”. Waking up the next morning, Rosie decides that everything that had happened was a dream.

Meanwhile, Norman searches for Rosie with the intent to kill her. He locates and travels to her city and begins killing her friends and acquaintances, including Peter Slowik and Anna the shelter director. He catches Rosie as she's returning from a date with Bill, but she flees from him into her apartment and lures him into the painting where Rose Madder kills him.

Rose gives Rosie some seeds and makes her promise to "remember the tree", whereupon Rosie leaves Rose's world and burns the painting. The narrative flashes forward several years and Rosie and Bill are married and have a daughter. Rosie begins to experience violent fantasies and outbursts of rage and comes to understand that she somehow absorbed these tendencies from Rose Madder in the dream world inside the painting. She plants one of the seeds near a lake where Bill took her on their first date, and as the tree grows she visits it regularly to keep herself sane and centered, ending the legacy of Rose Madder.

== Reception ==
The book received a mixed reception when it was published. Christopher Lehmann-Haupt of The New York Times describes in his review that the novel's "subplot seems forced, which is hardly surprising in light of how far-fetched it is," but he also describes that "Rose Madder is rarely dull and it builds to a vivid climax."

== Adaptations ==
In 1996, HBO Pictures acquired the rights to the novel to make a television movie. This would have been the first HBO film based on a Stephen King novel, but the project never came to fruition. A film adaptation of Rose Madder was in development in 2011, but the project fell apart. There was an audiobook made narrated by Blair Brown and King himself.

== Connections to other King works ==
- The character of Cynthia Smith appeared in Desperation and The Regulators.
- In the prologue, Rose is reading Misery's Journey, an entry in the fictional series of books written by the main character in King's novel, Misery.
- The city of Lud from The Dark Tower appears in this novel.
