= Richard Bachman =

Pen name used by Stephen King

Richard Bachman's author photo actually features Richard Manuel, a builder and friend of Stephen King's literary agent, Kirby McCauley. The photo is credited to Bachman's wife, Claudia Inez Bachman.

Richard Bachman is a pen name of American horror fiction author Stephen King, adopted in 1977 for the novel Rage. King hid the link between himself and Bachman until 1985. He collected the first four Bachman novels into The Bachman Books. Rage became controversial for its school shooting premise and was allowed to go out of print after the 1997 Heath High School shooting. In total, seven novels have been published under the Bachman name.

== Origin ==
At the beginning of King's career, the general view among publishers was that an author was limited to one book per year, since publishing more would be unacceptable to the public. King therefore wanted to write under another name in order to increase his publication without saturating the market for the King "brand". He convinced his publisher, Signet Books, to print these novels under a pseudonym.

In his introduction to The Bachman Books, King states that adopting the pen name Bachman was also an attempt to make sense of his career and try to answer the question of whether his success was due to talent or luck. He says he deliberately released the Bachman novels with as little marketing presence as possible and did his best to "load the dice against" Bachman. King concludes that he has yet to find an answer to the "talent versus luck" question, as he felt he was outed as Bachman too early to know. The Bachman book Thinner (1984) sold 28,000 copies during its initial run—and then ten times as many when it was revealed that Bachman was, in fact, King.

The pseudonym that King originally selected, Gus Pillsbury, is King's maternal grandfather's name, but at the last moment, because the pseudonym was outed, King changed it to Richard Bachman. Richard is a tribute to crime author Donald E. Westlake's long-running pseudonym Richard Stark. (The surname Stark was later used in King's novel The Dark Half, in which an author's malevolent pseudonym, "George Stark", comes to life.) Bachman was inspired by Bachman–Turner Overdrive, a rock and roll band which King was listening to at the time his publisher asked him to choose a pseudonym on the spot.

== Biography ==
King provided biographical details for Bachman, initially in the "about the author" blurbs in the early novels. Known "facts" about Bachman were that he was born in New York and served a four-year stint in the Coast Guard, which he then followed with ten years in the Merchant Marine. Bachman finally settled down in rural central New Hampshire, where he ran a medium-sized dairy farm, writing at night. His fifth novel was dedicated to his wife, Claudia Inez Bachman, who also received credit for the faked author photo on the book jacket. Other "facts" about the author were revealed in publicity dispatches from Bachman's publishers: The Bachmans had one child, a boy, who died in an unfortunate, Stephen King-esque accident at the age of six, when he fell into a well and drowned. In 1982, a brain tumour was discovered near the base of Bachman's brain; tricky surgery removed it. After Bachman's true identity was revealed, later publicity dispatches (and about the author blurbs) revealed that Bachman died suddenly in late 1985 of "cancer of the pseudonym, a rare form of schizonomia".

== Identification ==
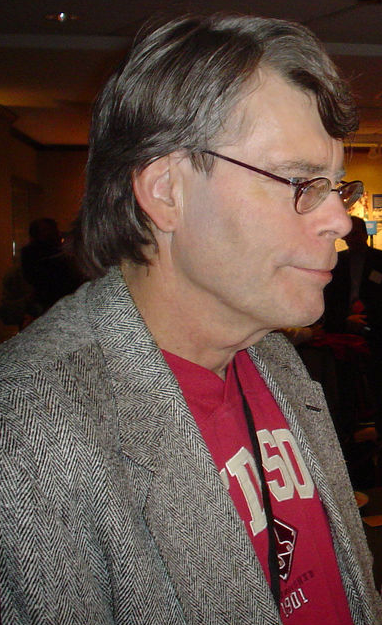
Stephen King

King dedicated Bachman's early books—Rage (1977), The Long Walk (1979), Roadwork (1981), and The Running Man (1982)—to people close to him. The link between King and his shadow writer was exposed in early 1985 after Steve Brown, a bookstore clerk in Washington, D.C., noted similarities between the writing styles of King and Bachman. Brown located publisher's records at the Library of Congress which included a document naming King as the author of one of Bachman's novels. Brown wrote to King's publishers with a copy of the documents he had uncovered, and asked them what to do. Two weeks later, King telephoned Brown personally and suggested he write an article about how he discovered the truth, allowing himself to be interviewed. At the time of the announcement in 1985, King was working on Misery, which he had planned to release as a Bachman book, but changed his mind after the outing. The next Bachman book was not until 1996, with The Regulators, and the last Bachman book was the 2007 Blaze. These latter books were said to have been "found" or "discovered," as Bachman had canonically died before their publication date.

== Post-outing ==
In 1987, the Bachman novel The Running Man inspired the Paul Michael Glaser film of the same name. King insisted that his name not be on the credits, and the screen credit for the film went to Richard Bachman.

King used the "relationship" between himself and Bachman as a concept in his 1989 book The Dark Half. In the novel, a writer's darker pseudonym takes on a life of its own. King dedicated The Dark Half to "the late Richard Bachman." Originally there were plans to make the book a collaboration between the two, although this was later scrapped.

In 1996, Bachman's The Regulators came out, with the publishers claiming the book's manuscript was found among Bachman's leftover papers by his widow. It was released as a companion novel to King's Desperation; the two novels took place in different universes but featured many of the same characters. The two book covers were designed to be placed together to form a single picture. In the foreword by King included with Desperation he said that there may be another Bachman novel left to be "found".

The next Bachman book to be "discovered" was Blaze. Blaze was, in fact, an unpublished novel by King, written before Carrie or the creation of Richard Bachman. For its publication, King rewrote, edited, and updated the entire text. It was published in 2007 under the Bachman pseudonym, with a foreword by King under his own name.

King has taken full ownership of the Bachman name on numerous occasions, as with the republication of the first four Bachman titles The Bachman Books: Four Early Novels by Stephen King in 1985. The introduction, titled "Why I Was Bachman", details the whole Bachman/King story. (In 1996, the collection was reissued with a new King essay, "The Importance of Being Bachman".)

Bachman was also referred to in King's The Dark Tower series of books. In the fifth book, Wolves of the Calla, the sinister children's book Charlie the Choo Choo is revealed to be written by "Claudia y Inez Bachman". The spelling discrepancy of the added 'y' was later explained as a deus ex machina on the part of "The White" (a force of good throughout King's Tower series) to bring the total number of letters in her name to nineteen, a number prominent in King's series. In the next novel of the series, Song of Susannah, King briefly discusses his Richard Bachman pseudonym.

After the 1997 Heath High School shooting, King announced that he would allow Rage to go out of print, fearing that it might inspire similar tragedies. Rage for a time continued to be available in the United Kingdom in The Bachman Books collection, although the collection now no longer contains Rage. In a footnote to the preface of Blaze, dated 30 January 2007, King wrote of Rage: "Now out of print, and a good thing." King's other Bachman novels are available in the US in separate volumes.

In 2010, King appeared as Bachman in the third season of the FX television series Sons of Anarchy in a cameo role, the character performing contract work quietly disposing of deceased bodies.

In issue 29 of the comic adaptation of The Stand, Richard "Rich" Bachman appears as one of the top lieutenants of Randall Flagg, replacing the character of Whitney Horgan from the original novel. He is drawn to resemble King.

In the 2013 Grimm episode "Nameless", Bachman being a pseudonym of King was a plot point. King's novel, Rage, had its title page used as a prop for the killer to write a note to the police.

The 2025 film adaptation of The Running Man openly credits King with having written the original book, unlike the 1987 adaptation. So did the film version of The Long Walk released the same year.

In autumn 2025, Benjamin Percy launched The End Times, an "epistolary novel" told as a series of newspapers set in the universe of The Stand, in collaboration with King. King's sections of the project carry the byline of Claudia Inez Bachman.

== Bibliography ==
- Rage (1977)
- The Long Walk (1979)
- Roadwork (1981)
- The Running Man (1982)
- Thinner (1984)
- The Bachman Books (1985, collection)
- The Regulators (1996)
- Blaze (2007)
