= Stephen King's Desperation =

2006 television film directed by Mick Garris

- Created by: Stephen King
- Based on: Desperation by Stephen King
- Written by: Stephen King
- Directed by: Mick Garris
- Starring: Ron Perlman; Tom Skerritt; Steven Weber; Annabeth Gish; Shane Haboucha; Sammi Hanratty
- Theme music composer: Nicholas Pike
- Country of origin: United States
- Original language: English

Production
- Executive producers: Mick Garris; Stephen King; Mark Sennet
- Producer: Kelly Van Horn
- Editor: Patrick McMahon
- Running time: 130 minutes
- Production companies: Touchstone Television; Buena Vista Television; Sennet-Gernstein Entertainment
- Budget: $12 million

Original release
- Network: ABC
- Release: May 23, 2006

Stephen King's Desperation is a 2006 American made-for-TV horror film based on Stephen King's 1996 novel of the same name. King himself wrote the teleplay. The film was directed by frequent King collaborator Mick Garris and stars Ron Perlman, Tom Skerritt, Steven Weber and Annabeth Gish.

== Plot ==
Peter and Mary Jackson are driving through the Nevada desert when sheriff Collie Entragian stops them. He finds marijuana in their vehicle, though Entragian may have planted it. He takes them to jail. Entering the police station, they see a little girl dead on the floor, and Entragian shoots and kills Peter. Mary is thrown in a cell along with a young boy, David Carver, his parents, Ralph and Ellen, and an old man, Tom Billingsley. The dead girl is the Carvers’ daughter, named Pie. David kneels and prays.

Steve Ames is in his truck, following famous author Johnny Marinville. Ames is Marinville's assistant. Steve picks up a young female hitchhiker named Cynthia Smith. Johnny stops in the desert to urinate just as Entragian plants the same bag of marijuana he planted on Peter and Mary in Johnny's motorcycle bag and arrests him.

Back in the police station, David's mother, Ellen, asks him why he keeps praying. David reveals that he prays because God made "his" presence known to him by miraculously saving his friend Brian from the brink of death. He recollects that a drunk driver hit Brian when he and Brian were riding a bike. David began praying, offering to do whatever was asked of him so that his friend be saved. At that point, Brian regained consciousness. The doctor at the hospital described Brian's recovery as "miraculous".

David realizes Entragian's skin is breaking out and he keeps saying "Tak" because he is possessed. Entragian takes Ellen so he can move his spirit into her body. He leaves his vicious dog to guard the cells. Pie's ghost appears and gives David a bar of soap that glows green. David scrubs his body with the soap and, while the dog is distracted, slips through the bars of the jail cell. David searches the police station and finds a gun on the corpse of another sheriff. He returns and shoots the dog before freeing everyone.

Steve reaches the place where Entragian captured Johnny. He and Cynthia find Johnny's motorcycle hidden behind dry bushes. Cynthia and Steve search the town, finding all the residents dead. They meet up with the escaped prisoners that night. In a disused theater, Tom tells of events that took place 120 years ago when Chinese workers digging in a local mine known as 'The China Pit' discovered an evil spirit named "Tak". The now-possessed Ellen sends in a mountain lion which kills Tom. Ellen takes Mary so that Tak can have a new body.

David sees Pie's ghost in the theater. She leads him to the movie editing machine, where seemingly supernatural old footage reveals how Tak came to the town. Mary wakes up to find herself trapped in a shed, surrounded by rattlesnakes, scorpions, and tarantulas, waiting to be the next host for Tak. With the help of Pie, she manages to escape while seriously injuring Ellen's body. Tak is forced to take over the body of a buzzard.

Johnny confesses that 40 years ago in Vietnam, he saw a boy possessed by Tak blow up the bathroom of a bar, killing 87 people. Johnny still feels guilty that he did not warn any of the patrons before fleeing the bar. The group returns to the cave with explosives they found, to put an end to Tak. At the entrance, the buzzard emerges and kills Ralph. To redeem himself, Johnny goes into the mine and enters a hole leading to a pit where Tak resides. Johnny ignites the explosives, blowing up the mine and sacrificing himself, while the survivors drive away in Steve's truck.

Driving away from the town, they pass by the empty RV owned by David's family and Peter's sister's car. Mary tells Steve to stop the truck to retrieve an overnight case from the car. In the back seat, Mary finds a photo album belonging to David with a frontispiece picture of Johnny and Pie together, which Steve identifies as being signed by Johnny.

== Cast ==
- Tom Skerritt as Johnny Marinville, a famous author who was in Vietnam when he was young
  - Tom Parker as Young Johnny
- Ron Perlman as Collie Entragian, the sheriff of the town of Desperation, already possessed by Tak at the start of the movie
- Steven Weber as Steve Ames, a man who works for Johnny
- Annabeth Gish as Mary Jackson, Peter's wife
- Charles Durning as Tom Billingsley, an old veterinarian who lives in the town
- Shane Haboucha as David Carver, a boy who talks to God
- Matt Frewer as Ralph Carver, David's father
- Kelly Overton as Cynthia Smith, female hitchhiker
- Henry Thomas as Peter Jackson, Mary's husband
- Sylvia Kelegian as Ellen Carver, David's mother
- Sammi Hanratty as Pie Carver, David's deceased sister
- Ewan Chung as Shih, Chinese miner, brother to Cha'an
- Alain Uy as Cha'an, Chinese miner, brother to Shih
- Trieu Tran as Unnamed Vietnamese boy

== Production ==
The film was produced in 2004, though it was not released until 2006. Filming primarily took place in Bisbee, Arizona, in the nearly deserted Lowell borough, with other sequences in Old Bisbee, the outskirts of Bisbee and Tucson, Arizona. During filming, a set in the Tucson Convention Center (TCC) caught fire. Five people were injured. The fire destroyed everything on the set, including all production gear and equipment, and the TCC was heavily damaged.

== Release and reception ==
The film was first broadcast in the United States on May 23, 2006, followed by its DVD release in the United States on August 29 of the same year. The film received moderately favourable reviews, including a 46 rating from Metacritic. Though originally intended as a two-part miniseries, Desperation aired in its entirety on May 23, 2006, on ABC, after a red-carpet premiere screening at Tucson's historic Fox Theatre (built in 1929). ABC aired Desperation at the same time as Fox's American Idol, an action that King himself was upset with, believing it did not do as well in the ratings because of that.
