= The Running Man (2025 film) =

2025 film by Edgar Wright

- Theatrical release poster
- Directed by: Edgar Wright
- Screenplay by: Michael Bacall (Note: Bacall is credited twice for writing the screenplay—first as a solo writer and as part of a writing team with Edgar Wright.); Edgar Wright
- Based on: The Running Man by Stephen King
- Produced by: Simon Kinberg; Nira Park; Edgar Wright
- Starring: Glen Powell; William H. Macy; Lee Pace; Michael Cera; Emilia Jones; Daniel Ezra; Jayme Lawson; Sean Hayes; Colman Domingo; Josh Brolin
- Cinematography: Chung-hoon Chung
- Edited by: Paul Machliss
- Music by: Steven Price
- Production companies: Kinberg Genre; Complete Fiction
- Distributed by: Paramount Pictures
- Release dates: November 5, 2025 (Odeon Luxe Leicester Square); November 12, 2025 (United Kingdom); November 14, 2025 (United States)
- Running time: 133 minutes
- Countries: United Kingdom; United States
- Language: English
- Budget: $110 million
- Box office: $69 million

The Running Man is a 2025 dystopian action film directed and produced by Edgar Wright, from a screenplay by Wright and Michael Bacall. It is the second adaptation of the 1982 novel by Stephen King, following the 1987 film. It stars Glen Powell as Ben Richards, a competitor on a lethal reality television show. The cast also features William H. Macy, Lee Pace, Michael Cera, Emilia Jones, Daniel Ezra, Jayme Lawson, Sean Hayes, Colman Domingo, and Josh Brolin.

The Running Man premiered at Odeon Luxe Leicester Square in London on November 5, 2025, and was released on November 12 in the United Kingdom and on November 14 in the United States, by Paramount Pictures. The film received mixed reviews and was a box office bomb, grossing $69 million worldwide on a $110 million budget.

== Plot ==
In the near future, the United States is ruled by the Network, an authoritarian media network. Most viewers live in poverty with little access to healthcare, and the Network placates the masses with trashy, violent game shows and reality television. The most popular program is The Running Man, hosted by Bobby Thompson, in which three "runners" can win $1 billion by surviving 30 days while being hunted down by the Network's five hunters, led by the mysterious Evan McCone, as well as ordinary citizens. Given $1,000 and a 12-hour head start, runners are required to film themselves every day, or else forfeit their earnings but still be hunted.

Ben Richards, a blue-collar worker in the slums of Co-Op City, is unable to afford flu medicine for his two-year-old daughter, Cathy, after being blacklisted for union activism. Ben tries out for the Network, intending to join a less dangerous show, but is unexpectedly chosen for The Running Man along with Tim Jansky and Jenni Laughlin. Executive producer Dan Killian convinces Ben to join by offering him a safe house for his family and an advance for Cathy's medication. As the hunt begins, Ben acquires disguises and travels to New York City. Checking into a hotel in disguise, Ben watches the live feed of hunters killing Tim. As he flees to Boston, Ben begins to experience paranoia that gradually gets worse as the hunt continues.

In Boston, the hunters and soldiers track Ben to a hotel and shoot at him, leading to an explosion that kills eight soldiers. Anti-Network activist Bradley Throckmorton shelters Ben at his home, attempting to expose the Network's propaganda and deceit. Ben sends a video denouncing their action, but the broadcast content is replaced with a foul-mouthed deepfake of Ben, angering the public, including Bradley's mother, who kicks him out of the house.

Bradley sends Ben to Derry, Maine to meet Elton Parrakis, a fellow activist who prepares to lead Ben to a bunker for the remainder of his run. Ben stops Elton's mother from alerting the authorities, but Elton, whose police officer father was killed by corrupt colleagues, does so anyway. He dispatches them with boobytraps, then flees with Ben in a buggy. McCone kills Elton, while Ben crashes the buggy into another Hunter on a bridge and escapes into the river below. Jenni is killed, leaving Ben as the sole remaining contestant, while his survival has earned the support of the poor and working class.

Traveling north, Ben discovers that a land development has paved over the bunker. Escaping surveillance drones, he commandeers a passing car and takes the wealthy driver, Amelia Williams, hostage. Amelia realizes the truth about the Network's propaganda after seeing televised deepfakes of herself and agrees to help Ben. Reaching an airfield, they take off in a jet to Canada, guarded by McCone. Killian calls to offer Ben his own show as the Network's newest hunter if he kills McCone and the remaining hunters, broadcasting footage of them murdering Ben's wife and child to drum up support for Ben.

Enraged, Ben kills the hunters posing as the flight crew, and McCone reveals himself as a former runner who took Killian's deal after nearly winning the first season. After killing McCone, Ben sends Amelia to safety with a parachute and Elton's revolutionary pamphlets. Killian gives Ben the chance to accept his new show on live TV, but Ben instead pleads for viewers to hunt down Killian and his fellow executives. The Network redirects the jet to their headquarters, airing a deepfake of Ben threatening to crash into the building, and the plane is shot down.

Sometime later, Bradley posts a video disputing the network's story, revealing that the plane's black box was recovered with an unaltered recording of Ben's conversations with Killian, inciting a rebellion against the network. Ben, who survived due to the plane's auto-eject function, has become the face of the revolution and reunites with his family, whose deaths were faked by Killian. As the next season of The Running Man begins, Bobby senses the audience's hostility and quits, leaving Killian to host. As a riot breaks out, Ben emerges from the crowd and shoots Killian.

== Cast ==
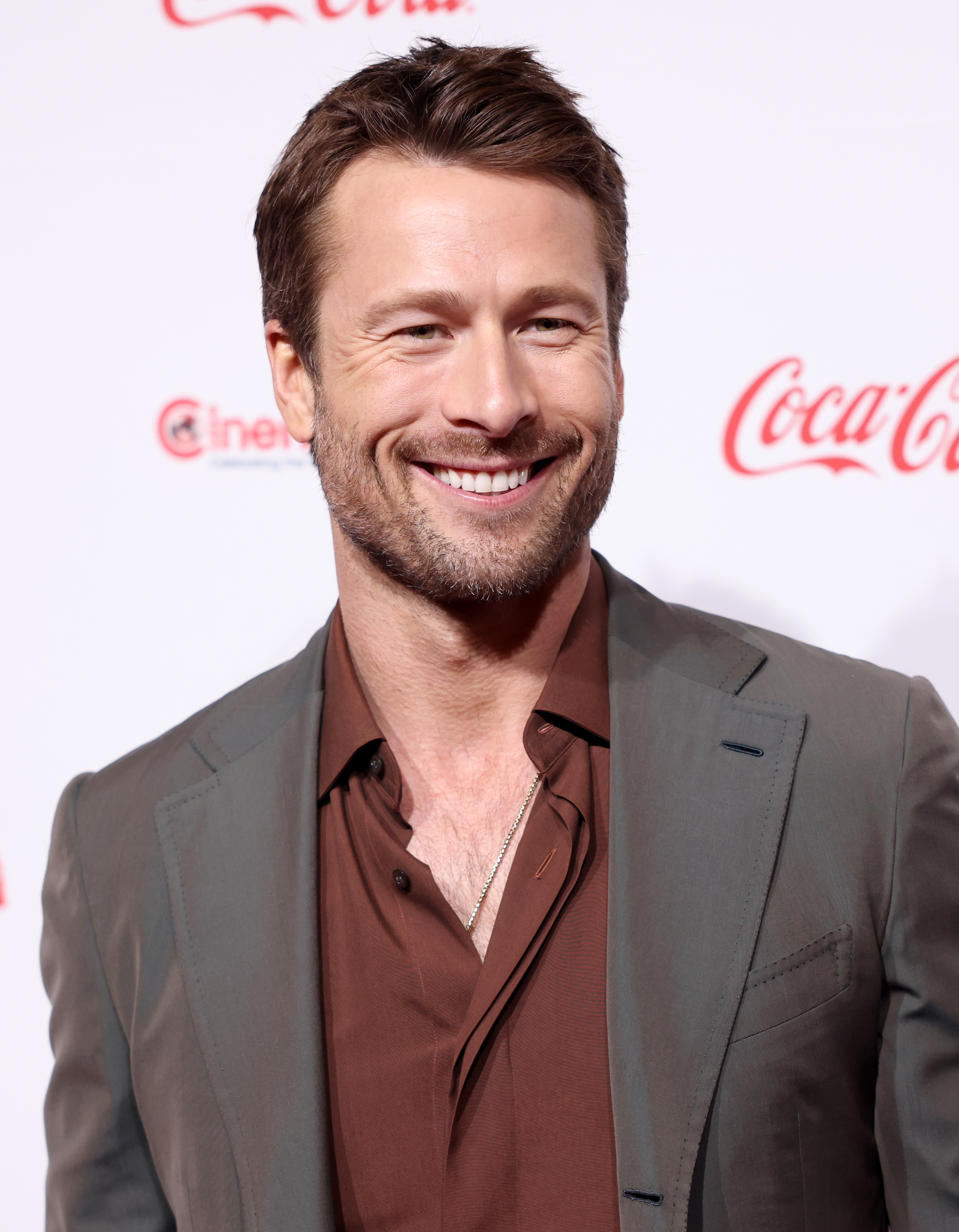
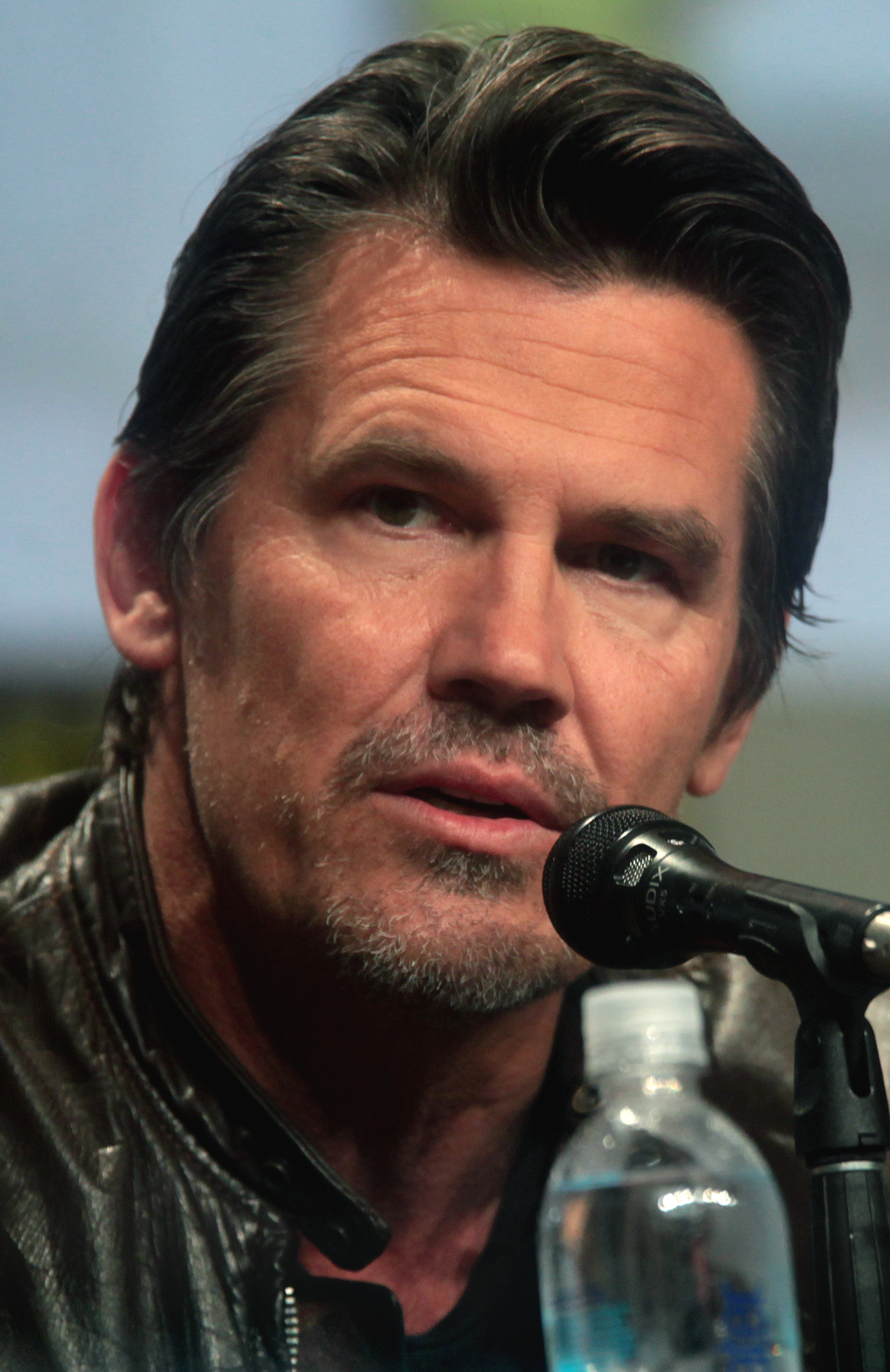
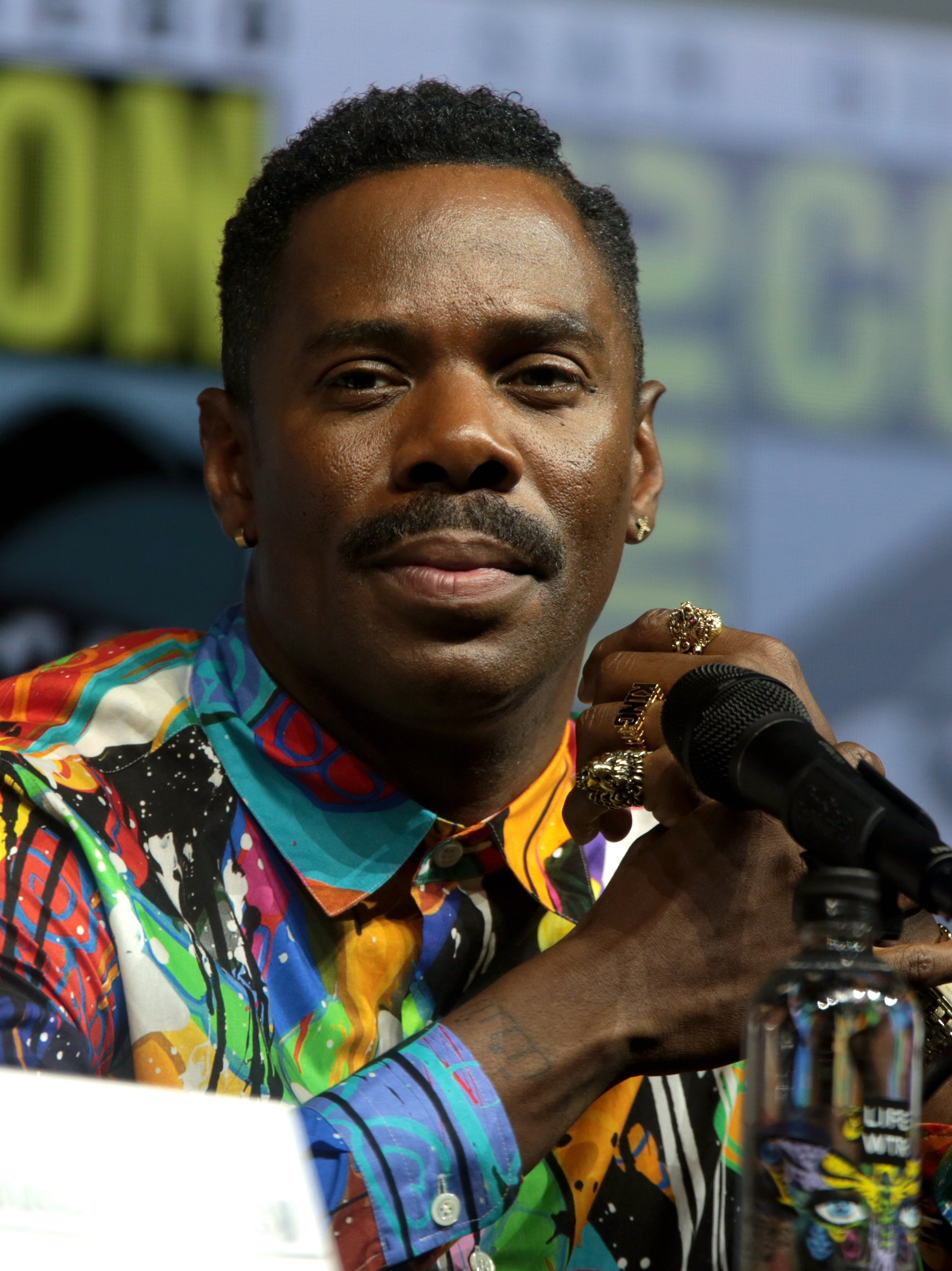
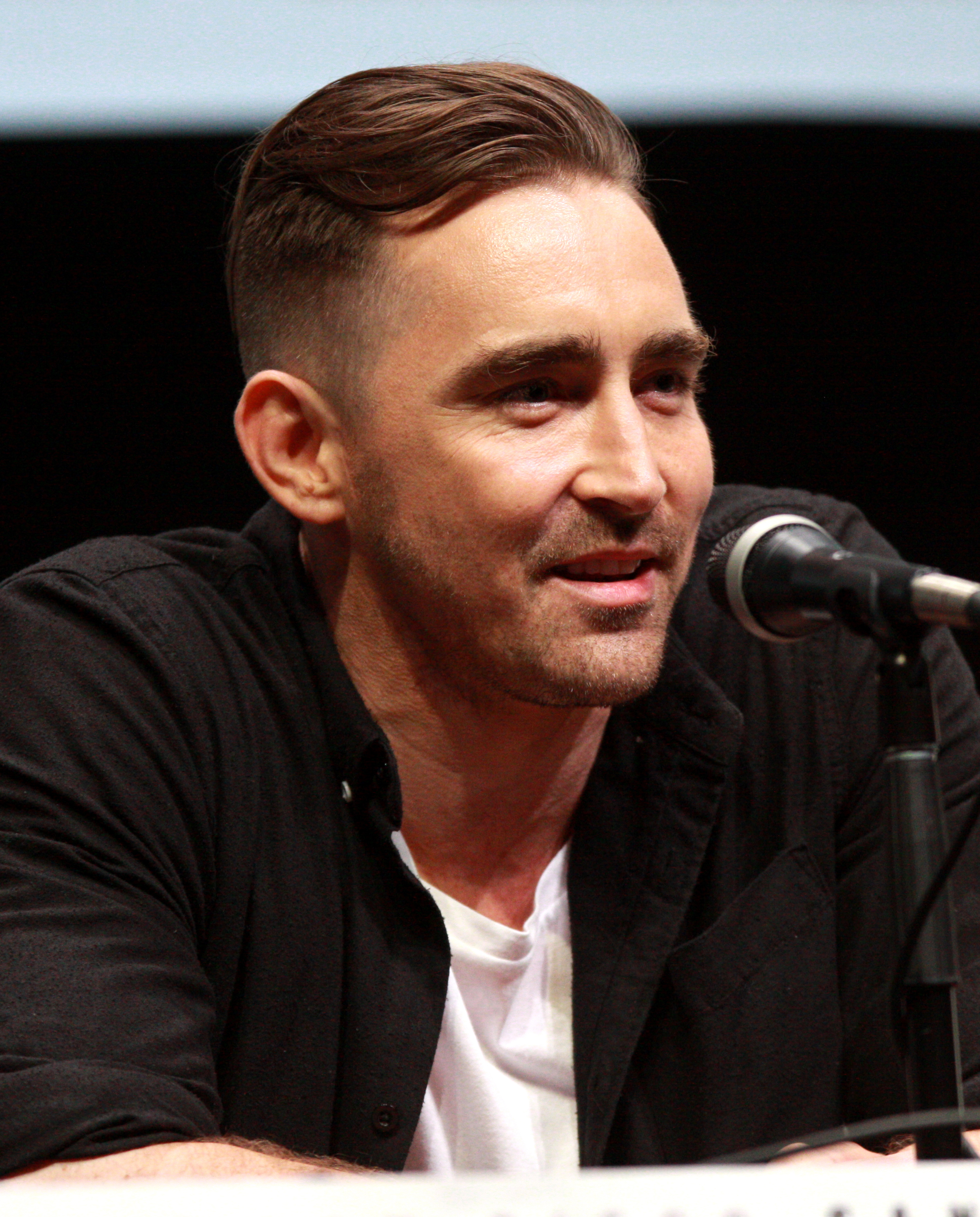
Glen Powell, Josh Brolin, Colman Domingo, and Lee Pace star as Ben Richards, Dan Killian, Bobby T, and Evan McCone respectively
- Glen Powell as Ben Richards, a blacklisted laborer who signs up for The Running Man
- William H. Macy as Molie, a man who provides Ben with disguises when he is on the run
- Lee Pace as Evan McCone, the masked leader of the hunters on The Running Man
- Michael Cera as Elton Parrakis, a rebel who helps Ben
- Emilia Jones as Amelia Williams, a civilian taken hostage by Ben
- Daniel Ezra as Bradley, a rebel and livestreamer who aids Ben
- Jayme Lawson as Sheila Richards, Ben's wife
- Sean Hayes as Gary Greenbacks, a TV host
- Katy O'Brian as Jenni Laughlin, a contestant on The Running Man
- Colman Domingo as Bobby T, the host of The Running Man show
- Josh Brolin as Dan Killian, the producer of The Running Man
- Karl Glusman as Frank, a hunter on The Running Man
- David Zayas as Richard Manuel, Ben's former employer
- Martin Herlihy as Tim Jansky, a contestant on The Running Man
- Danny McCarthy as the YVA manager
- Angelo Gray as Stacey, Bradley's younger brother

George Carroll appears as Agent Dugg, a Network security officer. Sandra Dickinson appears as Elton's conspiracy crazed mother Victoria. Olunike Adeliyi appears as Bradley and Stacey's mother. Debi Mazar, Catherine Cohen, Emma Sidi and Noah Ritter cameo as the stars of The Americanos, a trashy Network reality show. Rich Hall cameos as Roberts, a homeless man in Derry. Sophie Simnett cameos as a virtual ticket agent. Corey Johnson cameos as a motel owner. James Austin Johnson voices a Network announcer.

In addition, Arnold Schwarzenegger, who played Ben Richards in the 1987 film, has an uncredited cameo appearance as the face on the $100 bill.

== Production ==
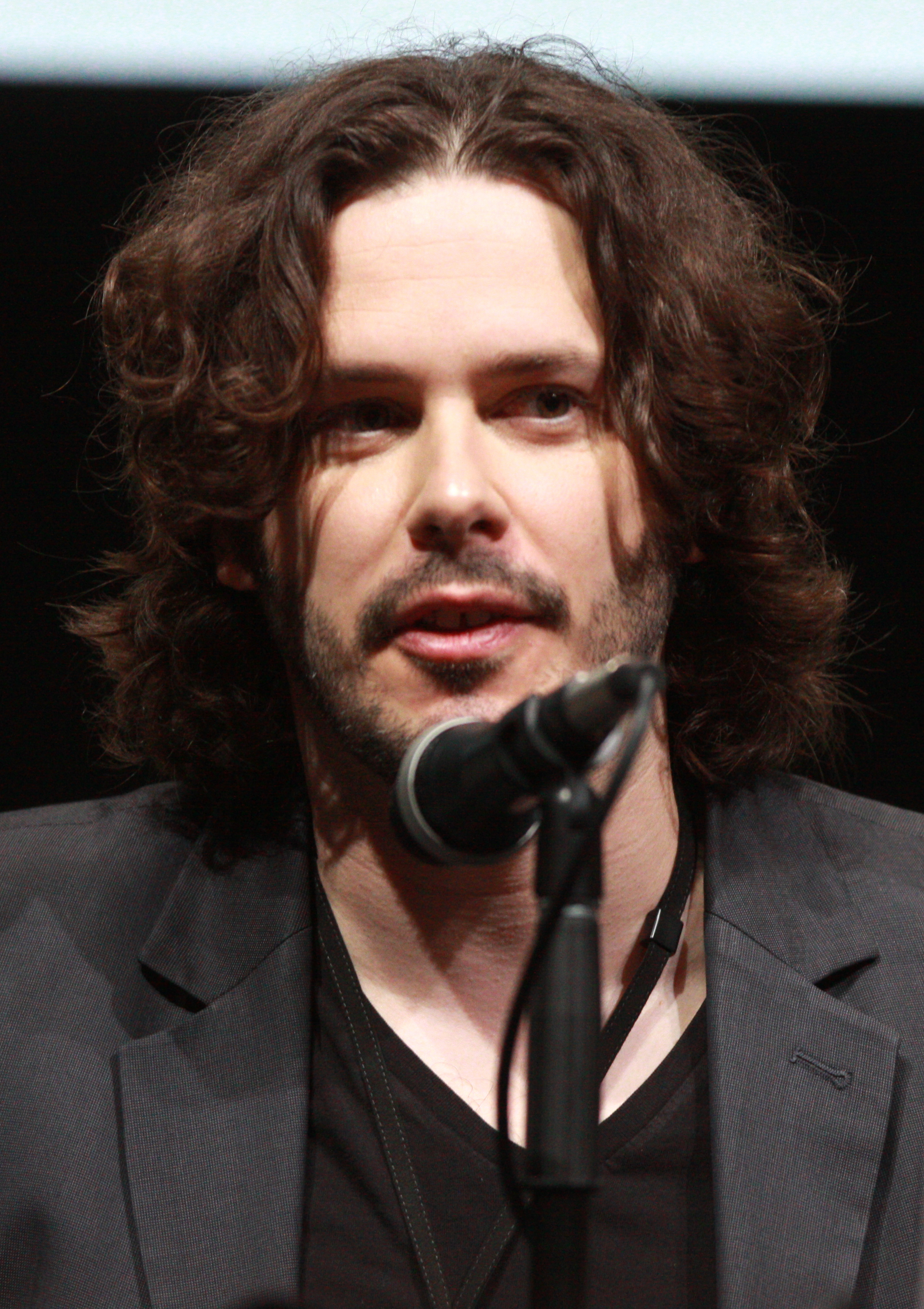
Director Edgar Wright (pictured 2013)

=== Development ===
In 2017, Edgar Wright expressed interest in directing a remake of the 1987 film The Running Man, itself an adaptation of the 1982 novel by Stephen King, with Chris Evans in the leading role. It has been a dream project for Wright, who was a fan of the original novel as a teenager but expressed disappointment with the 1987 film adaptation. When producer Simon Kinberg heard of this, he emailed Wright and asked him to join the project.

In February 2021, Paramount Pictures announced a film based on the novel was in development. Wright was attached to direct, having developed a story with Michael Bacall, who wrote the screenplay. The adaptation would not be a remake of the original film but a "much more faithful" adaptation of the novel. Domain Entertainment co-financed the film with Paramount.

Kinberg and Audrey Chon were announced as producers under Kinberg's Genre Films, alongside Nira Park of Wright's British production company Complete Fiction. In April 2024, Glen Powell was cast in the lead role. Powell said he contacted Arnold Schwarzenegger, who gave the film his "full blessing".

Additional cast members were announced in the following months, including: Katy O'Brian, Daniel Ezra, Karl Glusman, Josh Brolin, Jayme Lawson, Lee Pace, William H. Macy, Michael Cera and Emilia Jones in October; Sean Hayes and David Zayas in December; and Colman Domingo in January 2025.

=== Filming ===
Principal photography began in the United Kingdom on 4 November 2024. It took place in London including at Canary Wharf and for at least one week at Wembley Stadium for the shooting of an action sequence. Shooting also took place in various locations around Glasgow, including the SEC Armadillo and OVO Hydro, and the Anderston Centre Other scenes were shot in Bulgaria. Filming concluded on March 28, 2025.

=== Editing ===
Paul Machliss was the editor, making it his fifth collaboration with Wright. Industrial Light & Magic provided the visual effects.

== Music ==
In September 2025, Steven Price was revealed to have composed the score, having previously worked with Wright on The World's End (2013), Baby Driver (2017) and Last Night in Soho (2021).

== Marketing ==
The first footage was screened during Paramount's CinemaCon presentation on April 3, 2025. It was introduced by Domingo who was on stage with Wright, Powell, and Brolin. The first trailer was released on July 1, 2025, featuring a remix of "Underdog" by Sly and the Family Stone. Powell collaborated with the social media influencer Ashton Hall, by appearing in one of his "morning routine" videos, with the video ending with Hall watching the trailer in a private theatre.

On October 10, 2025, a panel was held at New York Comic Con, which was attended by Wright, Powell, and Lee Pace. 12 minutes of footage was shown to attendees, alongside a new trailer, which was released online three days later, featuring a remix of "Don't Bring Me Down" by Electric Light Orchestra. On October 28, 2025, an advance screening was held at the Paramount lot, which was attended by filmmakers like Joe Dante, Walter Hill, Rian Johnson, Gareth Edwards, Joseph Kosinski, Barry Jenkins, Jordan Peele, The Daniels and Phil Lord & Christopher Miller. Powell appeared via video message on the twelfth episode of The Challenge: Vets & New Threats to introduce the daily challenge inspired by the film.

== Release ==
The Running Man premiered at Odeon Luxe Leicester Square on November 5, 2025. It made its American premiere at AMC Lincoln Square on November 9. It was theatrically released in the United States on November 14. It was previously scheduled to be released on November 21, before being moved up to November 7, and then pushed back to its current date to avoid competition with Predator: Badlands. The Running Man began streaming on Paramount+ from January 13, 2026. It was released on DVD and Ultra HD Blu-ray on March 3.

== Reception ==
=== Box office ===
The Running Man grossed $38 million in the United States and Canada, and $32 million in other territories, for a worldwide total of $69 million.

In the United States and Canada, it was released alongside Now You See Me: Now You Don't and Keeper, and was projected to gross $23–25 million in its opening weekend. It made $1.9 million in Thursday box office previews and debuted to only $16.5 million in its opening weekend, finishing second at the box office behind Now You See Me: Now You Don't.

=== Critical response ===
On the review aggregator website Rotten Tomatoes, 61% of 313 critics' reviews are positive, with an average rating of 6.1/10. The website's consensus reads: "Spiritedly sprinting through grim source material, Edgar Wright's The Running Man doesn't live up to the director's high bar for inventive action extravaganzas but maintains a slick stride." Metacritic, which uses a weighted average, assigned the film a score of 56 out of 100, based on 52 critics, indicating "mixed or average" reviews. Audiences polled by CinemaScore gave it an average grade of "B+" on an A+ to F scale, the same as the original film, and a definite recommend score of 58%. The film has an average rating of 6.3 on IMDb as of October 2026, with viewers critiquing the ending of the film as well as pacing issues. The film was also criticized by users for failing the Bechdel Test, with its female characters having a limited role in the story.

Chris Klimek called The Running Man a "bloody hoot" in a 3.5-out-of-4 review for The Washington Post, with praise for the direction and performances. Matt Zoller Seitz of RogerEbert.com gave it two and a half out of four, writing: "The relentless pace generates enough of an endorphin rush to power the movie beyond plausibility nitpicking. It also prevents the audience from probing its worldview too closely, up to a point. That's probably for the best." Owen Gleiberman of Variety viewed the remake as an improvement on the 1987 Schwarzenegger movie, but he did not find the dystopian themes unique or compelling. Gleiberman wrote that "because we’ve seen so many garishly downbeat sci-fi movies, dystopia is now the air that our imaginations breathe." Peter Bradshaw of The Guardian awarded the film three stars out of five, calling it "retro-futurist and steampunky, though it is always watchable and buoyant." He reserved praise for Wright's confident direction.

An NPR review by Linda Holmes points out the irony of this dystopian plot, originally written in 1982 by Stephen King, that takes place in the USA of some indeterminate future that has finally caught up with the 2025 real-life reality in America of massive income gaps, extreme poverty, unaffordable and thus unobtainable healthcare costs, environmental destruction and corporate greed-fueled human rights abuses depicted in the movie.

==== Stephen King's response ====
King himself praised the adaptation, calling it a "bipartisan thrill ride". He read and approved the script changes, finding the film captured the book's essence of the protagonist being hunted in the real world, unlike the 1987 film.

=== Accolades ===
Award	Date of ceremony	Category	Nominee(s)	Result	Ref.
Golden Trailer Awards	May 28, 2026	Best Action	"What It Takes" (Paramount Pictures / BOND)	Won	
Golden Trailer Awards	May 28, 2026	Best Action Poster	Alt Art "Tunnel" (Paramount Pictures / The Refinery)	Nominated	
Guild of Music Supervisors Awards	February 28, 2026	Best Music Supervision in Major Budget Films	Kirsten Lane	Nominated	
Kansas City Film Critics Circle	December 21, 2025	Buster Keaton Award for the Best Stunt Ensemble Film	The Running Man	Nominated	
Las Vegas Film Critics Society	December 19, 2025	Best Action Film	The Running Man	Nominated	
Las Vegas Film Critics Society	December 19, 2025	Best Stunts	The Running Man	Nominated	
Saturn Awards	March 8, 2026	Best Science Fiction Film	The Running Man	Nominated	
