= Roadwork (novel) =

1981 novel by Stephen King

- U.S. First edition cover
- Author: Stephen King (as Richard Bachman)
- Language: English
- Genre: Psychological Thriller
- Publisher: Signet Books
- Publication date: March 3, 1981
- Publication place: United States
- Media type: Print (Paperback)
- Pages: 274
- ISBN: 978-0-451-09668-5

Roadwork is a thriller novel by American writer Stephen King, published in 1981 under the pseudonym Richard Bachman as a paperback original. It was collected in 1985 in the hardcover omnibus The Bachman Books. The story takes place in an unnamed city of the Midwestern United States in 1972–1974. Grieving over the death of his son and the disintegration of his marriage, a man is driven to mental instability when he learns that both his home and his workplace will be demolished to make way for an extension to an interstate highway.

A film adaptation of the novel was announced in August 2019, with Pablo Trapero as director and Andy Muschietti (director of It and It Chapter Two) and Barbara Muschietti as producers. As the adaptation is no longer listed on the movie page of King's website, it is likely that the project has been canceled.

== Plot ==
During a man-on-the-street news interview in August 1972, an unnamed man (later identified as Barton George Dawes) gives his angry opinion of a new highway extension project.

The narrative then jumps forward to November 1973, with Dawes, seemingly unaware of the underlying motivations of his actions, visiting a gun shop and purchasing two high-powered firearms: a .44 Magnum revolver and a hunting rifle chambered for .460 Weatherby Magnum cartridges. The story gradually reveals that Dawes' son Charlie had died of a brain tumor three years earlier, and that Dawes is unable or unwilling to sever his emotional ties to both the industrial laundry where he works and the house in which Charlie grew up. The laundry and his entire neighborhood are to be demolished as part of the project.

Dawes resigns his middle management job at the laundry after sabotaging the purchase of its new facility, and his wife, Mary, leaves him once she learns of both these actions and his failure to find a new house for the couple. Dawes then approaches Salvatore Magliore, the owner of a local used-car dealership with mafia ties, in an attempt to obtain explosives. Magliore initially dismisses him as a crackpot, so Dawes assembles a load of Molotov cocktails and uses them to damage the highway construction equipment. He is not caught, and his actions cause only a brief delay in the project. Dawes initially refuses to accept the money being offered by the city for the house under the eminent domain statute, but changes his mind after the city's attorney threatens to publicize his brief tryst with Olivia Brenner, a young hitchhiker who had previously taken shelter at the house. Magliore has Dawes' house checked for listening devices planted by the city, and later agrees to sell him a load of explosives. Dawes gives Mary half the money from the house sale, gives $5,000 to an elderly man at a coffeehouse, and has Magliore invest most of the remainder on Olivia's behalf, who is now living in Las Vegas, after paying for the explosives.

In January 1974, with only hours remaining before he is required to leave the property, Dawes wires the whole house and garage with the explosives and barricades himself inside. When the police arrive to forcibly evict him, he shoots at them, killing no one but forcing them to take cover and attracting the attention of the media. Dawes coerces the police into letting a reporter - the same one who interviewed him in 1972, though neither recognizes the other - enter and speak to him. Once the reporter has left, Dawes tosses his guns out the window and sets off his explosives, destroying the house and killing himself.

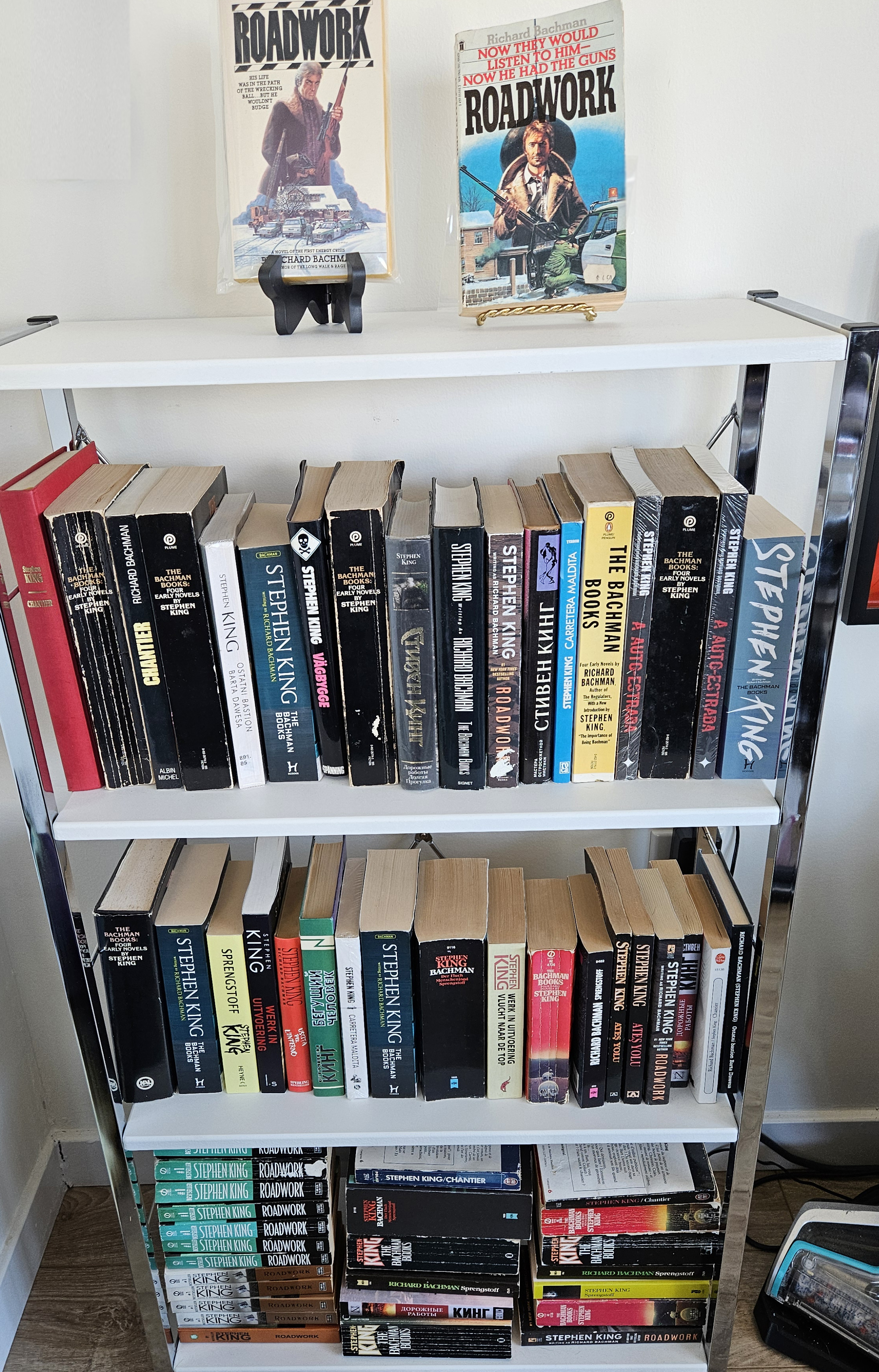
First US (1981) and UK editions (1983) of Roadwork, foreign language editions, trade paperbacks and hardcovers

A short epilogue reveals that the reporter and his team ultimately won a Pulitzer Prize for their coverage of the incident and uncovered the truth about the extension project: there was no real reason for it. Unless the city built a certain number of miles of road per year, it would become ineligible for federal funding of interstate construction projects. The city quietly began preparing to sue Mary for her share of the eminent domain payout, but dropped the suit in the wake of public outcry.

== Author's comments ==
In the introduction to The Bachman Books, King stated: "I think it was an effort to make some sense of my mother's painful death the year before – a lingering cancer had taken her off inch by painful inch. Following this death I was left both grieving and shaken by the apparent senselessness of it all... Roadwork tries so hard to be good and find some answers to the conundrum of human pain."

King also described his disappointment with the work, and stated that he was of two minds about having it reprinted, but decided to proceed, in order to give readers an insight into his personality at the time. In a new introduction to the second edition of The Bachman Books, King stated that he had changed his mind and that Roadwork had become his favorite of the early books.

== Connections to other King works ==
The mangle in the laundromat where Dawes works is nicknamed "The Mangler", because of "what would happen to you if you ever got caught in it." King had previously published a short story called "The Mangler" (1972), in which a demon-possessed mangle kills workers in an industrial laundry facility. Roadwork relates a story about a .22 caliber, single-shot rifle that Barton Dawes had bought as a boy:

He had wanted that rifle for three years and when he finally got it he couldn't think of anything to do with it. He shot at cans for a while, then shot a blue jay. The jay hadn't been a clean kill. It sat in the snow surrounded by a pink blood stain, its beak slowly opening and closing.

In Apt Pupil (1982), Todd Bowden sees an injured blue jay on the ground while cycling; the bird's beak opens and closes slowly. In Desperation (1996), the character Audrey Wyler recalls:

The year I was twelve, my old man gave me a .22. The first thing I did was to go outside our house in Sedilia and shoot a jay. When I went over to it, it was still alive, too. It was trembling all over, staring straight ahead, and its beak was opening and closing, very slowly.
