= Desperation (novel) =

1996 novel by Stephen King

- First edition cover
- Author: Stephen King
- Language: English
- Genre: Horror
- Publisher: Viking
- Publication date: September 24, 1996
- Publication place: United States
- Media type: Print (Hardcover)
- Pages: 690
- ISBN: 978-0-670-86836-0

Desperation is a horror novel by American author Stephen King. It was published in 1996 at the same time as its "mirror" novel, The Regulators, itself published under King's Richard Bachman pseudonym. It was also made into a TV film starring Ron Perlman, Tom Skerritt and Steven Weber in 2006. The two novels represent parallel universes relative to one another, and most of the characters present in one novel's world also exist in the other novel's reality, albeit in different circumstances.

Desperation is a story about several people who, while traveling along the desolated Highway 50 in Nevada, get abducted by Collie Entragian, the deputy of the fictional mining town of Desperation. Entragian uses various pretexts for the abductions, from an arrest for drug possession to "rescuing" a family from a nonexistent gunman. It becomes clear to the captives that Entragian has been possessed by an evil being named Tak, who has control over the surrounding desert wildlife and must change hosts to keep itself alive. They begin to fight for their freedom, sanity and lives before realizing that if they are ever to escape Desperation, they must trap Tak in the place from which he came.

== Plot ==
Peter and Mary Jackson are driving quietly on a desolate Nevada highway when they are pulled over and arrested by the disturbed Collie Entragian. They are taken to the police station of a deserted small mining town named Desperation, where Entragian kills Peter. Several other people are held captive here: the Carver family, whose daughter was also killed by Entragian; Johnny Marinville, a writer who was on a cross-country motorcycle trip to gather new material; and Tom Billingsley, the town veterinarian. Meanwhile, Johnny's assistant Steve, who had been trailing him at a distance, finds Johnny's bike and searches for him with Cynthia, a hitchhiker.

Entragian takes Ellen Carver with him, and during his absence, the intensely devout eleven year old David Carver manages to free everyone, and the party takes him on as a spiritual guide. They take refuge in an abandoned theater and are joined by Steve, Cynthia and Audrey, an employee of the mine. They realize that they are the only survivors of a wave of carnage committed by an evil supernatural entity named Tak. Tak had been imprisoned in an old mine shaft and can take possession of human beings, but this possession quickly deteriorates the host and requires Tak to change hosts. Tak can also manipulate desert wildlife such as coyotes, buzzards, spiders and scorpions. Billingsley is killed by a cougar controlled by Tak, and Audrey, also under its influence, attempts to kill David. She nearly succeeds in strangling him, but is prevented by the intervention of Steve and Johnny. Tak occupies Ellen's body and takes Mary captive.

The survivors contemplate leaving the town, but David, having come out of a trance, reveals to them that God has other plans for them. Mary takes advantage of the rapid deterioration of Ellen's body to escape her, and upon Ellen's death, Tak occupies the body of a golden eagle. The group gather some ANFO to blow up the well from which Tak escaped. Tak attacks David, but kills his self-sacrificing father Ralph. Johnny prevents the now-orphaned David from giving his own life and takes his place by blowing up the well and sealing Tak inside. David, Mary, Steve and Cynthia begin to leave the town of Desperation. While in Mary's car, David finds in his pocket the hall pass from his previous "deal with God" with a message from Johnny written on it.

== Characters ==
- Mary Jackson; poet and wife of Peter Jackson.
- Peter Jackson; English professor and husband of Mary Jackson.
- Collie Entragian; former police officer in Desperation, now the third host of Tak but first one introduced in the novel.
- Kirsten Carver; daughter of Ralph and Ellen Carver, 7-year-old sister of David Carver, who calls her 'Pie'.
- David Carver; son of Ralph and Ellen Carver, 12-year-old brother of Kirsten Carver. Has a close relationship with God that reveals itself throughout the novel.
- Ralph Carver; husband of Ellen Carver and father of David and Kirsten Carver.
- Ellen Carver; wife of Ralph Carver and mother of David and Kirsten Carver. Becomes Tak's fourth host.
- Tom Billingsley; retired town veterinarian, former town councilman and alcoholic.
- John Edward Marinville; author acclaimed for his novel Delight, now an old washed up has-been traveling the country on a motorcycle.
- Steve Ames; Johnny's assistant, following him across the country in a truck.
- Cynthia Smith; a hitchhiker picked up by Steve on Highway 50.
- Brian Ross; David Carver's best friend. David made a deal with God so that Brian would come out of his coma after being hit by a drunk driver.
- Cary Ripton; pit-foreman of the mining pit and Tak's first host.
- Brad Josephson; receptionist for Desperation Mining Corporation and Tak's second host.
- Tak; an extradimensional demonic entity which possesses humans.

== Background and publication ==
King was inspired to write Desperation as a result of a cross-country drive in 1991, during which he visited the small desert community of Ruth, Nevada, near U.S. Route 50. His first thought was that the town's inhabitants were all dead. He then wondered who had killed them, and the idea occurred to him that the town's sheriff had done so. Desperation was released simultaneously with the novel The Regulators (published by King under the name Richard Bachman).

== Reception ==
Andy Butcher reviewed Desperation for Arcane magazine, rating it an 8 out of 10 overall, and stated that "In many ways, Desperation sees a welcome return to form for Stephen King, whose recent works have tended to meander somewhat between horror and thriller, often being over-long and somewhat dull to read. This book, however, builds nicely from a vague sense of unease into out-and-out unpleasantness, complete with mass murder, snakes, spiders, ancient evil and a fair splattering of visceral scenes. It has to be said that the direction of the plot is a little obvious, and the story relies on the deus ex machina of a kid with a direct line to God. However, such is the unfailing strength of King's description that these drawbacks are not problematic enough to ruin what is undoubtedly an extremely readable and gripping book."

=== Reviews ===
- Review by Edward Bryant (1996) in Locus, #428 September 1996
- Review by Peter Crowther (1996) in Interzone, November 1996
- Review by W. C. Stroby (1996) in Fangoria, November 1996
- Review [French] by Daniel Conrad (1997) in Galaxies, #5
- Review by Don D'Ammassa (1997) in Science Fiction Chronicle, #192 June 1997
- Review by Stephen Payne (1997) in Vector 194
- Review by Brian M. Thomsen [as by Brian Thomsen] (1997) in Dragon Magazine, August 1997

== Adaptations ==
In 2006, American network ABC broadcast a television film based on Stephen King's screenplay adaptation of his novel. The film was directed by frequent King collaborator Mick Garris and stars Ron Perlman, Tom Skerritt, Steven Weber and Annabeth Gish.

In 2026, a new adaptation was reported to be in development at Searchlight Pictures. The film will be produced by King, Sam Raimi, Zach Lipovsky, and Adam Stein, with the latter two in talks to direct.

== Connections to other works ==
- The term can-toi is used in the Dark Tower series to describe the Low Men in Yellow Coats, which are strange animal-human hybrids.
- In the Dark Tower short story "The Little Sisters of Eluria", the vampiric Sisters speak to each other in a language Roland does not recognize. All he can make out is "can de lach, mi him en tow", phrases from Desperation.
- Tak also appears in The Regulators.
- The character of Cynthia Smith first appeared in Rose Madder.
- The character Ellen Carver is shown recalling a book, Misery in Paradise, which was a book written by Stephen King's fictitious character Paul Sheldon in his novel Misery.
- The Tommyknockers are mentioned by the character Tom.
