= The Regulators (novel) =

1996 novel by Stephen King as Richard Bachman

- First edition cover
- Author: Stephen King (as Richard Bachman)
- Language: English
- Genre: Science fiction Horror
- Publisher: Dutton
- Publication date: September 24, 1996
- Publication place: United States
- Media type: Print (Hardcover)
- Pages: 480
- ISBN: 978-0-525-94190-3

The Regulators is a novel by American author Stephen King, writing under the pseudonym of Richard Bachman. It was published in 1996 at the same time as its "mirror" novel, Desperation. The two novels represent parallel universes relative to one another, and most of the characters present in one novel's world also exist in the other novel's reality, albeit in different circumstances. Additionally, the US hardcover first editions of each novel, if set side by side, make a complete painting, and on the back of each cover is also a peek at the opposite's cover.

King had previously "killed off" Bachman after the pseudonym was publicly exposed around the time of the 1984 release of the Bachman novel Thinner. However, on the book's jacket and in a tongue-in-cheek introduction by the book's editor, it was alleged that this 1996 work was written by Bachman years earlier, but the manuscript had only recently been discovered by his widow in a trunk. The novel began as a screenplay titled The Shotgunners. King says that film writer-director Sam Peckinpah read the script and made some suggestions, but Peckinpah died while King was writing the second draft.

== Plot ==
Along a residential street in the suburban town of Wentworth, Ohio, a paperboy is suddenly shot by a mysterious stranger in a red van. The neighborhood’s panicked civilians run for shelter while author Johnny Marinville attempts to contact the police. However, an otherworldly force prevents the call from going through. Two other colorful vans, each driven by mysterious and odd strangers, later appear and kill three more residents. Former police officer Collie Entragian directs the affected residents and corrals them into the homes of victim David Carver and veterinarian Tom Billingsley. Only two residents remain indoors the entire time, seemingly unfazed: Audrey Wyler and her autistic nephew Seth, whom she has been caring for since the death of his family two years ago, remain silent among the chaos.

During a trip to a mining town in Desperation, Nevada, an evil, otherworldly being named Tak took possession of Seth's body after it was released from a mine. Implementing strong mental influence, it later killed Seth’s parents and siblings. Tak then forced Audrey's husband to commit suicide. To survive, Audrey took refuge in a mental construct of her creation, modeling her safe place after a favorite retreat. Seth, meanwhile, is sent into the deep recesses of his mind while Tak is in control and suffers poor hygiene and nutrition as a result of the creature’s neglect. Because of his autism, Seth displays a gifted mental strength that is likely the reason Tak was drawn to him in the first place. It also helps keep his mind intact while Tak is in control. Tak is the source of the vans, which are derived from the cartoon MotoKops 2200, which Seth watches religiously. Seth also often watches a Western movie named The Regulators, and Tak eventually transforms the neighborhood into an Old West landscape with no way to escape, as some of the residents soon find.

After several other people are killed in various ways (including Collie, after being mistakenly shot by a neighborhood teenager named Jim Reed, who then committed impulse suicide), Seth makes time for Audrey to escape the house while Tak is preoccupied. After Audrey puts a laxative in Seth's milk, she takes the chance to go across the street to the Carver's home and explain the situation to the others. Seth ingests the laxative which causes Tak to leave Seth's body temporarily as it cannot stand witnessing the boy defecate. She slips back to the house with Johnny to try to rescue Seth before Tak returns, but Cammie Reed follows, with a gun. Distraught over the death of her son, Jim, earlier, Cammie kills Seth, and mortally wounds Audrey as Tak tries to re-enter the boy’s body. Tak’s attention is then diverted to her and it enters Cammie’s body instead. However, she cannot hold up to Tak the way that Seth could and her body is destroyed as a result of the possession. Tak leaves her in the form of smoke and dissipates in the wind. The vans disappear and the landscape is returned to its normal state. A short epilogue in the form of a letter reveals that Seth’s and Audrey’s spirits have taken up residence at the meadow from Audrey’s mental sanctuary, and live there happily in what is implied to be an alternate parallel paradise.

== Characters ==
- Cary Ripton; paperboy and baseball player.
- Hannibal; German Shepherd of the Reed family.
- Mary Jackson; wife of Peter Jackson. Had an affair.
- Peter Jackson; English professor and husband of Mary Jackson.
- Collie Entragian; former police officer.
- Kirsten Carver; mother of Ralph and Ellen Carver, wife of David Carver, who calls her 'Pie'.
- David Carver; father of Ralph and Ellen Carver, husband of Kirsten Carver.
- Ralph Carver; 6 year old favorite child of mother Kirsten Carver and father David Carver. Brother of Ellen Carver whom he calls 'Margrit the Maggot'.
- Ellen 'Ellie' Margaret Carver; 11 year old sister of Ralph Carver and daughter of David and Kirsten Carver.
- Tom Billingsley; retired town veterinarian.
- John Edward Marinville; author acclaimed for his novel Delight, and work on children's books. Former alcoholic and mediocre guitar player.
- Steve Ames; wandering guy in a truck.
- Cynthia Smith; worker at the EZ Stop 24.
- Brad Josephson; husband of Belinda Josephson.
- Belinda 'Bee' Josephson; wife of Brad Josephson.
- Marielle Soderson; rude wife of Gary Soderson.
- Gary Soderson; alcoholic husband of Marielle Soderson.
- Debbie Ross; visiting friend of Susie Geller.
- Susie Geller; teenage daughter of Kim Geller and friend of Debbie Ross.
- Kim Geller; racist mother of Susie Geller.
- Cammie Reed; mother of Jim and David Reed.
- Jim Reed; son of Cammie Reed, twin of David Reed, and potential love interest of Susie Geller.
- David Reed; son of Cammie Reed, twin of Jim Reed, and potential love interest of Susie Geller.
- Audrey Wyler; widow of Herb Wyler and aunt to Seth Garin. Victim of years of psychological abuse from Tak.
- Herb Wyler; deceased husband of Audrey Wyler and uncle to Seth Garin. Casualty of years of psychological abuse from Tak.
- Seth Garin; deceptively brilliant 8 year old autistic orphan. Nephew to Audrey and Herb Wyler and the only host of Tak.
- The Hobarts; a deeply religious family that had to move as a result of torture from Tak.

== Connections and adaptations ==
In the novel's epilogue, a letter written by a woman on her honeymoon to her friend mentions one of King's earlier works, The Shining. As a mirror novel, characters from Desperation appear, though in different roles and, in some cases, different physical appearances. In August 2014, King mentioned that there had been discussions about turning The Regulators into a TV series, but no other mention was made thereafter. In August 2022, it was announced that Bohemia Group had optioned the rights to the novel for an adaptation and tapped George Cowan to write the script with Justin Ross as producer, who also co-wrote the screenplay with Cowan.

== Reception ==
Andy Butcher reviewed The Regulators for Arcane magazine, rating it an 8 out of 10 overall, and stated that "Of the two books, The Regulators is my favourite, being the more imaginative. On the other hand, dedicated King fans will probably prefer Desperation. Either way, both are good, enjoyable books."

== Reviews ==
- Review by Edward Bryant (1996) in Locus, #428 September 1996
- Review by Peter Crowther (1996) in Interzone, November 1996
- Review by W. C. Stroby (1997) in Fangoria, January 1997
- Review [French] by Daniel Conrad (1997) in Galaxies, #5
- Review by Don D'Ammassa (1997) in Science Fiction Chronicle, #192 June 1997
- Review by Stephen Payne (1997) in Vector 194
- Review by Brian M. Thomsen [as by Brian Thomsen] (1997) in Dragon Magazine, August 1997
