= Blaze (novel) =

2007 novel by Stephen King

- First edition cover
- Author: Stephen King (as Richard Bachman)
- Language: English
- Genre: Crime novel, ghost story
- Publisher: Scribner
- Publication date: June 12, 2007
- Publication place: United States
- Media type: Print (hardcover)
- Pages: 304
- ISBN: 978-1-4165-5484-4

Blaze is a novel by American writer Stephen King, published under the pseudonym of Richard Bachman. King announced on his website that he "found it" in an attic. As stated in the afterword of Different Seasons, it was written before Carrie. King offered the original draft of the novel to his Doubleday publishers at the same time as 'Salem's Lot; the latter was chosen to be his second novel and Blaze became a "trunk novel." King rewrote the manuscript, editing out much of what he perceived as over-sentimentality in the original text, and offered the book for publication in 2007. The book also has an annex containing "Memory", a short story that was first published in 2006 and which King has since worked into Duma Key.

== Plot summary ==
The story concerns Clayton Blaisdell Jr. (known as "Blaze" for short, thus the title), a mentally disabled small-time con artist who kidnaps a wealthy gentleman's baby son, in the hopes of fulfilling the dreams of George Thomas Rackley, Blaze's deceased best friend and partner in crime and who continues to help him.

== King's comments on the book ==
On King's website, the following was posted in the "Future Works" section on November 28, 2006:

Many of you have been asking for more information about publication of Blaze following Steve's mention of it on his recent Lisey's Story book tour. This is another Bachman novel which he recently rediscovered. The original manuscript of Blaze was 173 pages long and was written in 1973. He has rewritten the first 100 pages. A lot of it needed editing to make it more timely since the 1973 references no longer worked. He's hoping to get it done by the end of the year. No publication deal has been signed, but he's sure there will be one.

In an interview with Lilja of Lilja's Library (posted January 16, 2007), King said:

I have been thinking about [Blaze] off and on for a while and every time I would think about it... you know I did the early books as Richard Bachman books and this is going to be a Bachman because it came from the same time. It was written right before Carrie and finally I thought to myself... the reason I've never done it was because, in my memory at least, it was a tearjerker of a book, you know it was kind of sentimental and just kind of... every now and then I think of what Oscar Wilde said about The Little Match Girl. He said that it's impossible to read about the little match girl without weeping tears of laughter and... you know something that is so sad it's actually funny.

(Wilde's actual quote was about Charles Dickens's novel The Old Curiosity Shop: "One must have a heart of stone to read the death of Little Nell without laughing.")
