= Thinner (novel) =

1984 novel by Stephen King as Richard Bachman

- First edition cover (Note: In later releases, King's authorship is credited along with his pseudonym.)
- Author: Stephen King (as Richard Bachman)
- Language: English
- Genre: Horror
- Publisher: NAL
- Publication date: November 19, 1984
- Publication place: United States
- Pages: 309
- ISBN: 978-0-453-00468-8

Thinner is a horror novel by American author Stephen King, published in 1984 by NAL under King's pseudonym Richard Bachman. The story centers on morbidly obese lawyer Billy Halleck, who, driving carelessly, kills an old Romani woman while she is crossing the street. He escapes legal punishment due to his connections, but the woman's 106-year-old father then curses Halleck to physically waste away, and the lawyer must find a way to undo the curse. King, who was overweight at the time of the novel's writing, created the novel's outline following an annual medical examination.

Following the book's release, media outlets discussed the similarities between the works of Bachman and King. Eventually, bookstore clerk Stephen Brown, a fan of King's work, located evidence from copyright data held in the Library of Congress that Bachman and King were the same person. After the secret of King's pseudonym was revealed, sales of Thinner increased tenfold. In total, over three million copies of Thinner have been sold. Critical reception to Thinner was polarized; some reviewers disliked the authorship deception and pessimistic ending, while others held these same points as merits of the book. The literary style, however, was generally praised. A film adaptation was released in 1996.

== Plot ==
Billy Halleck is a successful, arrogant lawyer known for his chronic obesity and sleazy manner. While driving across town he is distracted by his wife Heidi giving him a handjob and runs over an elderly Romani woman, killing her. Billy exploits his connections with the local police and courts to avoid punishment. The woman's father, Taduz Lemke, exacts vengeance by cursing Billy outside the courthouse — using the word "thinner" — and Billy begins to lose weight rapidly regardless of how much he eats. Worried and suspecting cancer, Billy consults a series of doctors, but they are unable to determine the cause of his weight loss. Later, Billy discovers that the judge who cleared him of manslaughter charges has been disfigured by hideous scales growing on his skin, while the policeman who committed perjury on Billy's behalf is now stricken with uncontrollable acne. Both men eventually die by suicide out of shame for their malformed appearances.

With the help of Richard "The Hammer" Ginelli, a former client with ties to organized crime, and information provided by private detectives, a now-emaciated Billy tracks the Romani band north along the seacoast of New England to Maine. He confronts Lemke at their camp and tries to persuade him to lift the curse, but Lemke refuses, insisting that Billy must face justice for killing Lemke's daughter. The Romani inhabitants throw Billy out of their camp, though not before Lemke's great-granddaughter Gina shoots him through the hand with a ball bearing fired from a slingshot.

Billy calls for help from Richard, who sends a mob doctor to treat Billy's hand and then threatens the Romani with violence until Lemke agrees to meet with Billy. Lemke brings a strawberry pie with him and adds blood from Billy's wounded hand to it. He explains that for the curse to be lifted, Billy must pass it to someone else by getting them to eat the pie; however, the old man implores Billy to eat it himself so that he may die with dignity. Billy finds Richard's severed hand in his car and goes home, intending to feed the pie to Heidi as he blames her for his predicament. He falls asleep, and when he wakes, he is horrified to find that his beloved daughter Linda is now cursed. Without hesitation, he cuts a slice for himself.

== Background ==
The idea for Thinner came to author Stephen King during an annual medical exam. King knew he had gained weight, and as soon as he entered the exam room, the doctor asked him to step on the scale. King was angered at the doctor for not allowing him to undress or use the bathroom first. The doctor informed King that he was overweight at 236 pounds (107 kg) and his cholesterol levels were elevated, and recommended losing weight and quitting smoking. King spent the next few days fuming over the doctor's perceived insolence, but upon calming down, he decided to lose weight and cut back on his smoking. When he managed to lose a few pounds, he was simultaneously delighted and distressed, elaborating that "Once the weight actually started to come off, I began to realize that I was attached to it somehow, that I didn't really want to lose it. Then I began to think about what would happen if somebody started to lose weight and couldn't stop".

In several scenes in the story, the Gypsy characters speak in what was intended to be their native language. Not knowing said language, King turned to Swedish editions of his books and pulled random phrases from them (in the book Haunted Heart by Lisa Rogak, the language is erroneously identified as Czechoslovak). King noted that his readers called him out on this, and admitted that he "deserved to be because it was lazy". The novel's working title, Gypsy Pie, became the name of the book's 27th chapter.

Thinner was published in November 1984 as the fifth book by Richard Bachman. It was Bachman's first book to be published in hardcover. In May of that year, the book was presented at the American Booksellers Association Convention as a featured title. The novel was heavily advertised and promoted in bookstores across the country. Elaine Koster, in a promotional letter attached to advance reading copies, wrote "As the publisher of some of the finest horror novels ever written, it takes a lot to get me excited about a new horror writer. Such a writer has now appeared". Koster knew that King was the real author of Thinner, but repressed the urge to reveal the writer's identity in respect to his privacy.

=== Authorship exposure ===
The back of the novel features a photo of Richard Manuel, a friend of King's literary agent Kirby McCauley. Manuel was a construction worker who lived near Saint Paul, Minnesota, and was selected by McCauley as someone who lived a great distance from New York, thus reducing the likelihood of him being recognized. Manuel was amused by his role, and following the book's publication, friends and relatives called him to note his resemblance to Bachman. Thinner revived interest in Bachman's previous works, most of which had been in print for six years, which was unusual for a supposedly unknown author.

Readers soon began sending irate letters to Bachman, accusing him of copying King's style, and some wondered if King and Bachman were the same person. King and his publisher maintained denial in the face of inquiries from major talk shows such as Good Morning America and Entertainment Tonight. In some interviews, King claimed to know Bachman informally, describing him as an unsociable chicken farmer who disdained publicity and telling reporters that "the poor guy was one ugly son of a bitch". A representative of B. Dalton's phoned New American Library and promised to purchase 30,000 copies of Thinner if the publisher confirmed their suspicions.

The secret was solved by Stephen P. Brown, a bookstore employee in Washington, D.C. Brown was an avid King fan who had also read all of Bachman's books. After reading an advance reading copy of Thinner, which came to his store a few months before its publication, he was "eighty percent convinced" that Bachman was King; he noted that their style was only differentiated by the downbeat endings of Bachman's books, which runs counter to King's general philosophy of ending his books in an uplifting manner (with Pet Sematary and Cujo being exceptions). Brown consulted the copyright documentation for Bachman's first four novels, and found that McCauley held the copyright for Rage. Brown sent a letter to King concerning his discovery, and eventually received a phone call from King, who admitted his secret identity. On February 9, 1985, King revealed himself to be Bachman in the Bangor Daily News under the headline "Pseudonym Kept Five King Novels a Mystery". Following this revelation, sales of Thinner increased tenfold from 28,000 to 280,000.

== Reception ==
Thinner was met with a favorable response from the Literary Guild; to King's amusement, one of the club's readers remarked that "This is what Stephen King would write like if Stephen King could really write". George Beahm compared protagonist Billy Halleck to Johnny Smith in The Dead Zone, describing him as "a victim of the wheel of fate". James Smythe, a columnist for The Guardian, treated him more harshly, regarding him as a "complete asshole" who admits no guilt for his actions. Smythe cited Halleck's decision to use his mafia connections to exact revenge instead of atoning for the old woman's death, as well as his belief that his wife is to blame for his own situation. He determined that Halleck's final action in the story was not a selfless deed, but "penance through self-destruction" intended as a means of avoiding the guilt of his family's deaths. Smythe remarked that while King had previously dabbled with the notion of unsympathetic protagonists (citing Carrie White, Jack Torrance, and Louis Creed as examples), he felt that "Halleck takes things a step further", observing that even his innocent daughter is punished for his selfish actions, and admitted to feeling satisfied by Halleck's suffering. In his review's conclusion, he recalled enjoying the ending for its "dark and cold" nature. Similarities were drawn between Thinner and Dark Melody of Madness, a short novel by Cornell Woolrich published in 1935. Woolrich's story also deals with a man cursed to lose weight to the death—although this time it is a voodoo spell, not a Gypsy curse.

== Film adaptation ==
A film adaptation of Thinner was filmed in 1996 by director Tom Holland, and premiered in theaters on October 25. Halleck was played by Robert John Burke, and Ginelli was played by Joe Mantegna. King makes a cameo appearance as pharmacist Dr. Bangor. Critical reviews were mostly negative. The film has a rating of 16% on the aggregator Rotten Tomatoes. With a budget of $14 million, the film grossed just over $15 million at home. The film's opening weekend brought it to third place with $5.6 million in grosses. The film fell out of the top ten after two weeks of release. Thinner was nominated for a Saturn Award for Best Make-up. The film's tagline is "Let the curse fit the crime". Because King was reportedly unsatisfied with the initial version of the film, some scenes were re-shot and the film's premiere was moved to a later date. According to George Beahm, the book's volume of events amounted to little more than a novella, which required the film's plot to be padded while remaining faithful to the book. Beahm concluded that the film "tried to please everyone... and pleased very few people in the end".
