= List of fictional atheists and agnostics =

The following is a list of fictional atheists and agnostics limited to notable characters who have, either through self-admission within canon works or through admission of the character creator(s), been associated with a disbelief in a supreme deity or follow an agnostic approach toward religious matters.

== Literature ==
Name	Book	Author	Notes	Refs
Morris Bellamy	Finders Keepers	Stephen King	A young murderer obsessed with John Rothstein's books, who eventually kills and robs him. He states that he does not believe in God.	
Holden Caulfield	The Catcher in the Rye	J.D. Salinger	The 17-year-old protagonist of author J. D. Salinger's The Catcher in the Rye. He is universally recognized for his resistance to growing older and desire to protect childhood innocence. Since the book's 1951 publication, Holden has become an icon for teenage rebellion and angst, and now stands among the most important characters of 20th-century American literature. The name Holden Caulfield, as shown below, was used in an unpublished short story written in 1942 and first appeared in print in 1945.	
Angel Clare	Tess of the d'Urbervilles	Thomas Hardy	Angel Clare, the love interest of Tess, admits to his father, a reverend, that he would not like to become a reverend after Mr. Clare finds a book that is "moral" but not "religious." Angel proceeds to tell him that he cannot follow the Church while "she refuses to liberate her mind from an untenable redemptive theolatry." When Tess assumes Angel Clare's religion, or lack thereof, she expresses that she and her husband do not "believe in anything spiritual." When she explains Angel Clare's reasoning for his lack of faith, Tess "paralleled" work from "Dictionnaire Philosophique to Huxley's Essays." Thomas Huxley created the concept of agnosticism, and Voltaire, the writer of The Dictionnaire, attacked many aspects of Christianity.	
Tess Durbeyfield	Tess of the d'Urbervilles	Thomas Hardy	The main protagonist of the novel, a young peasant who was raped by a noble. After her marriage to Angel Clare, she converts to atheism.	
Holly Gibney	Mr. Mercedes trilogy, The Outsider, If It Bleeds, Holly, Never Flinch	Stephen King	A private investigator with autism and obsessive-compulsive disorder and one of the most recurring characters in King's 21-century mythos. In End of Watch, she states that although she does not believe in God, she will pray for Bill Hodges.	
Brady Hartsfield	Mr. Mercedes	Stephen King	An American 30-year-old serial mass murderer. He stopped believing in a god after killing his younger brother Frankie.	
Ivan Fyodorovich Karamazov	The Brothers Karamazov	Fyodor Dostoevsky	One of the titular brothers and the most amoral one. Ivan's agnosticism stands in contrast to his half-brother's, Alyosha, devotion.	
Alexei Nilych Kirillov	Demons	Fyodor Dostoevsky	A mentally ill socialist, who does not believe in God and desires the whole world to commit suicide and set itself free from fear.	
Meursault	The Stranger	Albert Camus	An Algerian ("a citizen of France domiciled in North Africa, a man of the Mediterranean, an homme du midi yet one who hardly partakes of the traditional Mediterranean culture") who seemingly irrationally kills an Arab man whom he recognizes in French Algiers. The story is divided into two parts: Meursault's first-person narrative view before and after the murder, respectively.	
Dr. Bernard Rieux	The Plague	Albert Camus	The main character of the book, Rieux is a doctor who works devotedly throughout the book fighting the plague to the point of perpetual exhaustion. He is trustworthy, practical, and a humanist.	
Mothwing	Warrior Cats	Erin Hunter	Mothwing lacked belief in StarClan ever since her brother, Hawkfrost, admitted to faking the sign which led to her becoming a medicine cat. She usually hides her lack of faith, believing that the Clans would not stand for a medicine cat who did not believe in StarClan (as communing with StarClan is normally a large part of a medicine cat's duties).	
Howard Roark	The Fountainhead	Ayn Rand	An architect born in 1900, Roark is a model of artistic integrity, doing things in the way he thinks is right rather than in the conventional way. He is oblivious to social norms and pressures.	
Nikolai Vsevolodich Stavrogin	Demons	Fyodor Dostoevsky	A socialistic revolutionist. He admits he does not believe in God in his talk with Shatov.	
Noirtier de Villefort	The Count of Monte Cristo	Alexandre Dumas	A former Jacobite, he is an atheist, as revealed in the second half of the novel.	
Taryn Strayer	White Nights, Black Paradise	Sikivu Hutchinson	An African American woman non-believer and fictional member of the San Francisco-based Peoples Temple church at the center of the Jonestown, Guyana massacre tragedy	
Dagny Taggart	Atlas Shrugged	Ayn Rand	Taggart mentions that the only form of a prayer she knows is looking at her ancestor's statue.	
Jasnah Kholin	The Stormlight Archive	Brandon Sanderson	Jasnah is a prominent historian and powerful politician. While she acknowledges that there are powerful being in her universe, she does not believe that a true omnipotent God exists.	

== Comics ==
Name	Debut	Creator(s)	Notes
Anarky	Detective Comics No.608 (Nov. 1989)	Alan Grant Norm Breyfogle	A.k.a. Lonnie Machin, an ambiguous superhero/villain in publications of DC Comics.
Beta Ray Bill			An alien superhero from Marvel Comics, who believes that if something even dwells in the heavens, it is pointless to worship that "something".
Booster Gold			A.k.a. Michael Jon Carter, a superhero in publications from DC Comics.
Dr. Manhattan			From the graphic novel and Watchmen, who thinks that God does not exist, has also said that he is nothing like God.
Johnny C	Johnny the Homicidal Maniac	Jhonen Vasquez	Serial killer in Johnny the Homicidal Maniac.
Maggie Greene	The Walking Dead Issue 10 (July 2004)	Robert Kirkman	A character who founded in The Walking Dead
Iron Man	Tales of Suspense Issue 39 (March 1, 1968)		A.k.a. Anthony Edward "Tony" Stark, a superhero in the Marvel Universe.
Eugene Porter	The Walking Dead Issue 53 (October 10, 2008)	Robert Kirkman	A character in The Walking Dead
Rorschach			In the graphic novel Watchmen, this character says that they "Looked at sky through smoke heavy with human fat and God was not there. The cold, suffocating dark goes on forever, and we are alone"
Hank Pym			A.k.a. "Ant Man", a Marvel Comics character who founded in The Avengers
Spider-Man 2099 (Miguel O'Hara)		Peter David, Rick Leonardi	Miguel O'Hara does not believe in God, but still calls on him.
Mister Terrific			A.k.a. Michael Holt, a superhero in the DC Comics Universe.
Savage Dragon			Superhero who stars in his eponymous series from Image Comics.
Starman (Ted Knight)			Superhero from DC Comics and member of the JSA.
Colossus/Piotr Rasputin		Len Wein, Dave Cockrum	Member of the X-Men, originating from Communist Russia, hence his atheism.
Zoro		Eiichiro Oda	

== Video games ==
Name	Game	Notes	Refs
Emperor of Mankind	Warhammer	The Emperor saw religions as irrational superstitions that divided Humanity. To replace the old traditions of religion and faith he created an atheistic ideology known as Imperial Truth.	
Margit Eberbach	Maji de Watashi ni Koi Shinasai!	One of the heroines who is a German soilder and stated (at least in her route) to be an atheist.	
Ted Strayer	Fallout 3	A non-player character living in Rivet City. When Rev. Clifford tries to convince Strayer to believe in God, he responds that there is "no way in hell".	
Andrew Ryan	BioShock	Ryan created the underwater city of Rapture as a refuge from a world consumed by government, altruism and religion. He explicitly states that he does not believe in God.	
Sibrand	Assassin's Creed	In his last words to Altaïr Ibn-La'Ahad after the latter dealt with the Teutonic knight with his Hidden Blade and said that he would be safe in the arms of God soon enough, Sibrand replied that there was nothing waiting for him in the end, not even God or the afterlife, that they did not even exist and that it was the one thing what he feared most.	
Rodrigo Borgia	Assassin's Creed II	During his duel with Ezio Auditore da Firenze at the Vatican Vault, after failing to activate the Vault door because he did not have any First Civilization DNA in him, Rodrigo told to Ezio in the middle of the duel that he looked for God in the vault, shocking Ezio, which led to the latter to ask whether God was really in the Vault. Rodrigo replied that God being in the Vatican vault was a more logical answer and far more interesting than God being in the sky with angels singing cherubim all around. Ezio then asked what God would do once Rodrigo entered the vault. Rodrigo replied he was only after power, which Ezio asked whether God would give it up easily. Rodrigo then told that whatever lay beyond the Vault wall would not be able to resist the Staff and Apple and that they were made for felling gods. Ezio, being already a believer, replied that God was omniscient and omnipotent, and that mere artifacts could not harm Him, to which Rodrigo accused Ezio that he took up the image of God from other men. Ezio was shocked to learn of Rodrigo's atheism and rejection of the Bible, despite his papacy. Rodrigo then scoffed that Ezio was still too naive. Rodrigo then replied: "I became Pope because it gave me ACCESS. It gave me POWER. Do you think I believe a single god-damned word of that ridiculous book? It's all lies and superstition. Just like every OTHER religious tract written over the past ten thousand years."	
Al Mualim	Assassin's Creed	During his final fight with Altaïr Ibn-La'Ahad in Masyaf and brief talks about the Apple of Eden while the latter was bound by the Apple's powers, Al Mualim confirmed that Altaïr was immune to the effects of the Pieces of Eden, to which Altaïr asked what illusion it was. Al Mualim then denies the existence of any God whatsoever, by saying: "Is it any less real than the phantoms the Saracens and Crusaders follow now? Those craven Gods, who retreat from this world that men might slaughter one another in their names? They live amongst an illusion already. I'm simply giving them another, one that demands less blood."	
Mario Auditore	Assassin's Creed II	When speaking of the Auditore Villa Pastor to Ezio, Mario says "The prete (priest) seems a nice enough fellow, but I've never been much of a believer.".	
Arno Dorian	Assassin's Creed Unity	By the end of the game, Arno described the Creed in strongly atheistic terms and claims that there exists no higher power to judge humanity nor does a supreme being watch over humanity or punishes them for their sins, and that only humanity itself can guard itself against its own obsessions.	
Altaïr Ibn-La'Ahad	Assassin's Creed and Assassin's Creed II	After starting to research on the Apple of Eden, Altaïr began to have doubts about the existence of a God, citing various conflicts and contradictions in the religious books available in the Holy Land during his time, noting how cruel they were in their punishments of those who rejected the books, and thus began noting them down in his Codex. Altaïr, much like Arno Dorian, professed the Assassin's creed in strongly atheistic terms and called the "light of God" as a light that blinds society and forces it to "stumble about in ignorance".	
Terrence Sweetwater	Battlefield: Bad Company 2	During an idle conversation with Haggard, Sweetwater reveals that he rejects the concept of sin and a god, referring to them as "superstition", as well as just stating that he does not believe in a god.	
Malevola	Dispatch	Malevola identifies as an atheist, despite being half-demon and able to speak demonic languages.	

== Film ==
Name	Film	Notes	Refs
Nicholas Angel	Hot Fuzz	played by Simon Pegg	
Eleanor Ann Arroway	Contact	played by Jodie Foster	
Darrin "Doughboy" Baker	Boyz n the Hood	played by Ice Cube	
Celine	Before Sunrise	She does not believe there is a god.	
Dr. Norman Goodman	Sphere	Goodman refers to himself as an atheist, but is "flexible".	
Paul	Paul	An alien who deconverts a fundamentalist Christian	
Bill Williamson	Rampage and Rampage: Capital Punishment	A mass shooter and domestic terrorist who declares "There is no god, and there's never a god, and there will be no fucking god ever." He is played by Brendan Fletcher	
Willie Soke	Bad Santa	A safecracker and a Mall Santa who states in the sequel he does not believe in a god. He is played by Billy Bob Thornton.	
Fanny and Alexander Ekdahl	Fanny and Alexander	Alexander declares that a god does not exist after all the domestic abuse he went through from his minister step-father.	
The Blind Man	Don't Breathe	He calls god a bad joke. Played by Stephen Lang	
Pop	The Hunt	Pop, a left-wing liberal who owns a gas station and sternly believes in climate change, states he does not believe in Hell or God.	
Sandy Bates	Stardust Memories	played by Woody Allen	
Laine Billings Hanson	The Contender	played by Joan Allen	
Harry Block	Deconstructing Harry	played by Woody Allen	
Henry Drummond	Inherit the Wind	played by Spencer Tracy	
Charlie Holloway	Prometheus	played by Logan Marshall-Green	
David Labraccio	Flatliners	played by Kevin Bacon	
Ra.One	Ra.One	played by Arjun Rampal	
Malcolm Reynolds	Serenity	played by Nathan Fillion	
William Weir	Event Horizon	played by Sam Neill	"There is no Devil. There is no God. There is only... NOTHING."
Charles Lee Ray / Chucky	Child's Play	played by Brad Dourif	"There is no God." Curse of Chucky

== Television shows ==
=== Animated television shows ===
Name	Work	Notes	Refs
Holo	Spice and Wolf	Holo initially scoffs at the notion that one god created the entire world and everything in it; later on in the series, she states that there cannot possibly be a god given how much pain and sorrow there is in the world. However, she should be considered an agnostic as she herself is a wolf deity; she knows that gods like herself exist but expresses disbelief in a monotheistic God.	
Brian Griffin	Family Guy	Originally he was a closeted atheist in earlier seasons and it is revealed in "Love, Blactually" that he is an open atheist like Seth MacFarlane himself, who claims that this character represents him most. This was revealed when Brian is seen at a bookstore looking for The God Delusion by atheist Richard Dawkins. His atheism comes under attack in "Not All Dogs Go To Heaven" when he comes out to the Griffins about his atheism, and Meg, in a drastic effort to convert Brian to Christianity, makes his atheism public knowledge, quickly making him a social outcast. In the episode "April in Quahog", Brian is seen praying after learning that a black hole is going to destroy Earth, with Stewie teasing him for it.	
Malloy	Brickleberry	In "Two Weeks Notice", Malloy tries to convince the show's main protagonist Steve Williams that God cannot exist because of hunger, suffering and war particularly using Africa as an example. Malloy also dismisses that Heaven and Hell after life connections exist.	
Pope Francis	Brickleberry	In Brickleberry, Francis is parodied as a homicidal trash-talking con artist who is only interested in making money off of high church attendance having claimed that religion is just a "made up fairy tale". Because Woody Johnson grew a hemorrhoid that looked like Jesus, people stopped coming to church and started rushing to see his hemorrhoid, which made Francis try to kill Woody.	
Bullet	Paradise PD	The Paradise Police Department's contraband German Shepherd who alters the Bible for his own gain.	
Professor Hubert Farnsworth	Futurama	In The Simpsons/Futurama crossover "Simpsorama", it is revealed that Farnsworth is an atheist, and he goes even as far as to make an atheist prayer.	
Mr. and Mrs. Weatherhead	South Park	Both them are militant agnostics who oppose any statements of certainty in the episode "The Poor Kid".	
Rick Sanchez	Rick and Morty	In the pilot episode, Rick states, "There is no God, you gotta rip that band-aid off now, you'll thank me later" once he hears Summer say, "Oh my god"	
Daria Morgendorffer	Daria	In the episode "Groped by an Angel", her sister asks, "But, there's nothing watching over us? Nothing keeping track?" Daria replies, "until I see some pretty convincing evidence to the contrary, I think we're on our own."	
Edward Elric	Fullmetal Alchemist	In both series and the manga, Edward mentions to Rose that he does not believe in God, stating: "Alchemists are scientists. We don't believe in unprovable concepts like "God.""	

=== Live action television shows ===
Character	Live action television shows	Quotes / Notes	References
Ken Barlow	Coronation Street		
Temperance Brennan	Bones		
Wayne Callaway	Law & Order: Criminal Intent	"Just because we're atheists does not mean we don't know right from wrong. "	
Joe Carroll	The Following		
Trent Casey	Dexter		
Piper Chapman	Orange Is the New Black		
Brenda Chenowith	Six Feet Under		
Madison Clark	Fear The Walking Dead	"If I believed in God, which I don't, I'd ask where's the cosmic joke?"	
Sheldon Cooper	The Big Bang Theory		
Mark Corrigan	Peep Show		
Perry Cox	Scrubs		
Arthur Dietrich	Barney Miller		
Doctor	Doctor Who		
Charlie Eppes	Numb3rs		
Alicia Florrick	The Good Wife		
Michael Garibaldi	Babylon 5		
Rick Grimes	The Walking Dead	"I'm not much of a believer."	
Carl Grimes	The Walking Dead	"Heaven is just another lie, and if you believe it, you're an idiot."	
Ryan Hardy	The Following		
Madeline Hayes	Moonlighting		
Darlene Healy	The Conners		
Alfred Hofstadter	The Big Bang Theory		
Beverly Hofstadter	The Big Bang Theory		
Jeri Hogarth	Jessica Jones	"If I believed in God I'd say her sense of humor is for shit"	
Sherlock Holmes	Sherlock		
Homelander	The Boys	"No God. The only man in the sky... is me."	Episode: "The Only Man in the Sky"
Gregory House	House		
Kurt Hummel	Glee		
Patrick Jane	The Mentalist		
Annie January	The Boys	"There's nobody in the sky watching over us. Not God, not Homelander, not anybody. It's all just... lies."	Episode: "The Big Ride"
Daisy Johnson	Agents of S.H.I.E.L.D.		
Billy Keikeya	Battlestar Galactica		
Jen Lindley	Dawson's Creek		
Dougal McGuire	Father Ted		
Andy Millman	Extras		
Molly	The Walking Dead		
Dexter Morgan	Dexter		
Fox Mulder	The X-Files		
Paula	The Walking Dead	"Well, the good news is maybe you'll see her again soon."	
Patrick	The Walking Dead	Carol described Patrick as a "practicing atheist."	
Carol Peletier	The Walking Dead		
Britta Perry	Community		
Daniel Pierce	Perception		
Alice Pieszecki	The L Word		
Eugene Porter	The Walking Dead		
Dennis Reynolds	It's Always Sunny In Philadelphia		
Malcolm Reynolds	Firefly	"You're welcome on my boat. God ain't.	
Maggie Rhee	The Walking Dead	"I know it's not my business, and feel free to believe in God, but the thing is you've got to make it okay somehow no matter what happens."	
Peter Russo	House of Cards	"I don't believe in God."	
Salladhor Saan	Game of Thrones	"The one true god is what's between a woman's legs, and better yet a queen's legs."	
Sarah Jane Smith	Doctor Who		
Rust Cohle	True Detective		
Douglas Stamper	House of Cards	"I believe there are things beyond our control, who or what is controlling them, that I don't know."	
Gloria Stivic	All in the Family		
Michael Stivic	All in the Family		
Sue Sylvester	Glee		
Isak Valtersen	Skam	"Me? I believe in science. The theory of evolution. Nothing else."	
Frank Underwood	House of Cards		
Steven Wassenfelder	Defying Gravity		
Lindsay Weir	Freaks and Geeks		
Loretta West	Outrageous Fortune		
Rory Williams	Doctor Who	In the episode The God Complex, the Doctor, Amy, and Rory were trapped in the prison of the Minotaur, a creature which feeds off of faith. Since Rory was "not religious or superstitious", he was the only one who could see the exit, but it disappeared whenever he tried to show it to anyone else.	
Jeff Winger	Community		
Cristina Yang	Grey's Anatomy		
Elizabeth Jennings	The Americans		
Philip Jennings	The Americans		
