= Holly (novel) =

2023 novel by Stephen King

- First edition cover
- Author: Stephen King
- Audio read by: Justine Lupe
- Cover artist: Will Staehle
- Language: English
- Genre: Crime fiction
- Publisher: Scribner
- Publication date: September 5, 2023
- Publication place: United States
- Media type: Print (hardcover), e-book, audiobook
- Pages: 449
- ISBN: 978-1-66801-613-8 (First edition hardcover)
- Dewey Decimal: 813/.54
- LC Class: PS3561.I483 H56 2023

Holly is a 2023 crime novel by American author Stephen King. It was published on September 5, 2023, by Scribner. The novel follows Holly Gibney, who made her first appearance in Mr. Mercedes (2014). She also appeared in Finders Keepers (2015) and End of Watch (2016), and later was a major supporting character in The Outsider. She was also the central character in If It Bleeds, a novella in the 2020 collection of the same name. An excerpt from Holly was published in Entertainment Weekly on January 23, 2023. King wrote another novel featuring Holly Gibney, Never Flinch, which was released on May 27, 2025.

== Plot ==
In July 2021, amidst the COVID-19 pandemic, private investigator Holly Gibney mourns the death of her mother, with whom she had a complicated and strained relationship. While taking a break from work, Holly is contacted by Penelope Dahl, whose daughter Bonnie disappeared earlier that month. Holly is intrigued by Penelope's message and agrees to work on the case.

Holly learns that Bonnie was last seen at a convenience store near Deerfield Park before leaving on her bike. Her abandoned bike was later discovered with a note stating "I've had enough" attached to it. Holly also finds one of Bonnie's earrings near her last known location. She interviews several leads, including Lakeisha, Bonnie's best friend, who elaborates on Bonnie's difficult relationship with her mother. Throughout her investigation, she also learns of a boy named Peter Steinman, and Ellen Craslow, a janitor at the local college, who both disappeared under similar circumstances. Holly suspects their disappearances may be connected.

Meanwhile, a series of flashbacks reveal the culprits behind the disappearances: Emily and Rodney Harris, a retired elderly couple who are former professors at the college. It is revealed that the couple are cannibals who targeted victims they knew personally. They would lock the prisoners in their basement, force them to eat raw liver and ultimately kill them and consume their remains, believing that human flesh would heal their many pains and ailments. As the Harrises begin to experience more health problems (Emily with sciatica, and Rodney exhibiting early stages of Alzheimer's disease), they took Bonnie as their next victim.

Back in the present, Holly branches out her investigation to include Steinman and Craslow's disappearances, which leads her to find out about Cary Dressler. She eventually connects each victim to the Harrises. She sneaks into the Harrises' home to try and locate one last piece of evidence: the disability van that the Harrises used to lure and kidnap their victims. However, she is subdued by Rodney with a taser and taken captive in the basement.

While Holly is imprisoned, she finds Bonnie's other earring hidden in her cage. She goads Rodney (who has grown increasingly senile) into approaching her cage and uses the earring to slit his throat and kill him. Upon returning home and discovering her husband's body, a raging Emily attempts to kill Holly using Holly's own revolver, but Holly manages to reach through the bars and snap Emily's neck. Meanwhile, Barbara Robinson (Holly's friend, first introduced in Mr. Mercedes) connects the dots on where Holly disappeared to and arrives at the Harrises' home with the authorities to rescue Holly.

Following her encounter with the Harrises, Holly contemplates retirement; she ultimately decides against it and picks up the phone to take on another case.

== Reception ==
In a review in The New York Times, Flynn Berry commented that "when Holly appears on the page, you never have the sense of an author pulling her strings. Her decisions feel genuine, like Holly herself is running the show. ... Her presence balances the new novel's darkness. And there is quite a lot of darkness." Writing in USA Today, Brian Truitt gave the novel three out of four stars and stated, "While it might fall short of top-tier King, Holly satisfies as a fitfully freaky thriller, a solid exploration of the title character as a soulful beacon of hope, and a reminder of how important it is to answer that call when it comes." David Pitt for Booklist wrote, "In her new leading role, Holly shines. She's tough, relentless, and compassionate while at the same time being vulnerable and prone to lapses of confidence. The story is the kind of thing King excels at, too—dark, mysterious, and deeply unsettling. This is the novel Holly deserves."

Kirkus Reviews assessed the novel as catering mostly to loyal fans of King, but also criticized the novel's pacing, King's language and his "creaky" cultural references. Kirkus also felt the novel failed to deliver the pleasures of a mystery novel, writing, "Waiting for the private investigator heroine to get to where the reader is at the beginning of the story feels interminable."

A number of reviewers criticized Holly for its overt political content, including conservative columnist Christian Toto, who said of the book, "the snippets [of Holly] read as if Rob Reiner, who may have the worst case of Trump Derangement Syndrome, took over King's laptop. [Holly] ties into King's rage against so-called "anti-vaxxers," MAGA nation and more." Writer and columnist Kat Rosenfield was also heavily critical of Holly, calling King a "boomer" and expressing irritation at King's self-insertion of his own political views into the Holly Gibney character. King responded to the criticism in an interview for Rolling Stone, claiming that he had anticipated that some readers would be annoyed by the political views expressed in Holly, stating, "I think that a lot of people — particularly people on the other side of the COVID issue and the Trump issue — are going to give it one-star reviews on Amazon. But all I can say to those people is, 'Knock yourself out'."

== Television adaptation ==
In September 2023, at Printers Row Lit Fest in Chicago, director and producer Jack Bender announced that he would be adapting Holly into a television series.
