= Never Flinch =

2025 novel by Stephen King

- First edition cover
- Author: Stephen King
- Audio read by: Jessie Mueller
- Language: English
- Genre: Crime fiction
- Publisher: Scribner
- Publication date: May 27, 2025
- Media type: Print (hardcover), e-book, audiobook
- Pages: 439
- ISBN: 978-1-66808-933-0 (First edition hardcover)

Never Flinch is a crime novel by American author Stephen King. The book was published on May 27, 2025, by Scribner. The story follows recurring character Holly Gibney, who previously appeared in Mr. Mercedes (2014), Finders Keepers (2015), End of Watch (2016), The Outsider (2018), If It Bleeds (2020), and Holly (2023). The book was announced on November 18, 2024, with an excerpt published in Entertainment Weekly.

== Premise ==
A killer who sends a letter to the police, threatening to kill 13 innocents and one guilty person as retribution for the death of an innocent man in prison. Simultaneously, Holly Gibney is hired to protect a feminist activist, Kate McKay, who is facing threats from an anti-abortion activist.

== Background ==
In August 2023, speaking as a guest on an episode of the Talking Scared podcast, King confirmed plans for another novel featuring Holly Gibney, titled We Think Not. In July 2024, in his second appearance on the podcast, King announced that he had been working on a novel titled Always Holly since February 2023. He stated that his early inspiration for the novel was the February 2021 dognapping case involving singer Lady Gaga.

== Reception and awards ==
Publishers Weekly commended the novel's structure, writing, "Holly shines as a quirky but lovable beacon of hope amid the plot's grisly violence, and King never lets his Rube Goldberg–esque plot overshadow his characters' humanity." Writing for The New York Times, Ainslie Hogarth noted the novel's cinematic style and commended King's social critique of virtue signalling, writing that it "works well to draw so many initially disparate threads together over the course of the novel". Kirkus Reviews similarly characterized at as "[reading] like a big-screen thriller" and concluded, "The action is well paced, the settings are vividly drawn, and King's choice to focus on the real and deadly dangers of extremist thought is admirable. But the book is hamstrung by cliched characters, hackneyed dialogue (both spoken and internal), and motives that feel both convoluted and overly simplistic." A review of the Swedish translation, published in the Dagens Nyheter daily, describes Holly Gibney, "one of King's most convincing and interesting creations", as having become "pale and completely generic" in this novel. Referring to the afterword, where the author acknowledges that the book is not one of his best, the reviewer adds that "Stephen King should have 'let go' of this novel more definitively".

The novel was a finalist for the 2026 Locus Award for Best Horror Novel.
