= Rostaing (disambiguation) =

Rostaing is a French leather company.

Rostaing may also refer to:

- Rostaing Berenguier (14th century), Provençal troubadour
- Miguel Rostaing (1900–1983), Peruvian footballer and manager
- Hubert Rostaing (1904–1999), French linguist
- Charles Rostaing (1918–1990), French musician

== See also ==
- Rostagnus, for the given name Rostaing
- House of Sabran, which had several members named Rostaing
