= Mr. Mercedes (TV series) =

2017 American crime drama television series

- Genre: Crime drama; Psychological thriller; Horror
- Based on: Mr. Mercedes, Finders Keepers, and End of Watch by Stephen King
- Developed by: David E. Kelley
- Starring: Brendan Gleeson; Harry Treadaway; Kelly Lynch; Jharrel Jerome; Scott Lawrence; Robert Stanton; Breeda Wool; Justine Lupe; Mary-Louise Parker; Holland Taylor; Jack Huston; Maximiliano Hernández; Tessa Ferrer; Rarmian Newton; Gabriel Ebert
- Opening theme: "It's Not Too Late" by T Bone Burnett (season 1); "I Shall Not Be Moved" by Mississippi John Hurt (season 2); "Series of Dreams" by Bob Dylan (season 3)
- Country of origin: United States
- Original language: English
- No. of seasons: 3
- No. of episodes: 30

Production
- Executive producers: Marty Bowen; Wyck Godfrey; Chris Long; Shane Elrod; Tom Lesinski; Jenna Santoianni; Stephen King; Jack Bender; David E. Kelley
- Producers: Kate Regan; Ellen Stafford; Brian Walsh
- Camera setup: Single-camera
- Running time: 49–57 minutes
- Production companies: David E. Kelley Productions; Nomadicfilm; Temple Hill Productions; Sonar Entertainment

Original release
- Network: Audience
- Release: August 9, 2017 – November 12, 2019

Related
- The Outsider

Mr. Mercedes is an American crime drama television series developed by David E. Kelley. An adaptation of Stephen King's Bill Hodges trilogy of novels (Mr. Mercedes, Finders Keepers, and End of Watch), it stars Brendan Gleeson as Bill Hodges. It premiered on Audience on August 9, 2017, and concluded on November 12, 2019, spanning 30 episodes over three seasons.

Audience went defunct in May 2020, with no indication of whether Mr. Mercedes had been cancelled or renewed. The series was made available to stream on Peacock in September 2020.

== Premise ==
Retired detective Bill Hodges is still haunted by the unsolved case of "Mr. Mercedes", who claimed 16 lives when he drove a stolen Mercedes through a line of job-seekers at a local job fair. Meanwhile, brilliant young psychopath Brady Hartsfield emerges to focus his attention on Hodges. What begins as an online cat-and-mouse game soon has deadly real-life consequences as an increasingly desperate Hartsfield becomes bent on leaving his mark on the world.

== Cast and characters ==
=== Main ===
Actors are credited among main cast only in the episodes in which they appear.

- Brendan Gleeson as William "Bill" Hodges, a retired detective who is contacted by Brady
- Harry Treadaway as Brady Hartsfield (seasons 1–2), the main antagonist of the first two seasons, an electronics store worker.
- Holland Taylor as Ida Silver, Hodges' next-door neighbor
- Justine Lupe as Holly Gibney, Janey's OCD-afflicted cousin who becomes close with Hodges
- Jharrel Jerome as Jerome Robinson, Hodges' young, friendly neighbor who becomes involved in his investigation of Brady
- Breeda Wool as Lou Linklatter, Brady's sarcastic coworker
- Scott Lawrence as Peter Dixon (seasons 1–2), Hodges' former partner
- Robert Stanton as Anthony "Robi" Frobisher (season 1), Brady's invasive boss
- Kelly Lynch as Deborah Hartsfield (season 1), Brady's alcoholic, incestuous mother
- Mary-Louise Parker as Janey Patterson (season 1), Olivia Trelawney's sister who helps Hodges with his investigation
- Maximiliano Hernández as Antonio Montez (seasons 2–3), an assistant district attorney who begins working with Hodges
- Jack Huston as Felix Babineau (season 2), a skilled neurosurgeon
- Tessa Ferrer as Cora Babineau (season 2), the corrupt head of marketing at a major pharmaceutical corporation and Babineau's wife
- Rarmian Newton as Pete Saubers (season 3), a high school student who unwittingly crosses paths with Bellamy
- Gabriel Ebert as Morris Bellamy (season 3), the main antagonist of the third season, a volatile criminal and fan of John Rothstein's books

=== Recurring ===
- Nancy Travis as Donna Hodges (seasons 1–2), Hodges' estranged ex-wife
- Maddie Hasson as Allie Hodges (seasons 1 and 3), Hodges' estranged daughter
- Neko Parham as Lawrence Robinson (seasons 1–2), Jerome's protective father
- Makayla Lysiak as Barbara Robinson (seasons 1–2), Jerome's sister
- Ann Cusack as Olivia Trelawney (season 1), the woman whose Mercedes-Benz was used during Brady's murders
- Katharine Houghton as Elizabeth Wharton (season 1), Trelawney and Janey's elderly mother
- Laila Robins as Charlotte Gibney (season 1), Holly's controlling mother
- Nicole Barré as Izzy Torres (season 1), Dixon's current partner
- David Furr as Josh (season 1), a detective
- Tammy Arnold as Maggie Wilmer (season 2), a nurse that Hodges befriends
- Virginia Kull as Sadie MacDonald (season 2), a timid nurse who suffers from mild epilepsy
- Mike Starr as Library Al (season 2), a kind hospital volunteer who distributes books to patients
- Adam Stephenson as Jonathan Pettimore (season 2), a hospital administrator
- Kate Burton as Mrs. MacDonald (season 2), Sadie's mother
- Brett Gelman as Roland Finklestein (season 3), a defense attorney working with Hodges and Holly
- Natalie Paul as Sarah Pace (season 3), an assistant district attorney
- Glynn Turman as Judge Bernard Raines (season 3), a no-nonsense district judge
- Bruce Dern as John Rothstein (season 3), a crude, reclusive bestselling author
- Kate Mulgrew as Alma Lane (season 3), a woman who has been grooming Bellamy since he was a teenager
- Blythe Middleton as Young Morris (season 3), the young version of Morris Bellamy
- Josh Daugherty as Tom Saubers (season 3), Pete's depressed father who was disabled during Brady's massacre
- Claire Bronson as Marjorie Saubers (season 3), Pete's mother
- Meg Steedle as Danielle Sweeney (season 3), Bellamy's girlfriend
- Patch Darragh as Andrew Halliday (season 3), an associate of Bellamy's who runs a bookstore

== Episodes ==
Season	Episodes	Originally released	
Season	Episodes	First released	Last released
1	10	August 9, 2017	October 11, 2017
2	10	August 22, 2018	October 24, 2018
3	10	September 10, 2019	November 12, 2019

=== Season 1 (2017) ===
No. overall	No. in season	Title	Directed by	Written by	Original release date
1	1	"Pilot"	Jack Bender	David E. Kelley	August 9, 2017
In 2009, in the fictional town of Bridgton, Ohio, an unidentified man massacres a crowd of people waiting in a job fair line using a stolen Mercedes-Benz. Two years later, homicide detective Kermit "Bill" Hodges retires after being unable to catch the killer and is contacted by him, being taunted by videos he sends that delete themselves. Hodges asks his tech-savvy young neighbor Jerome Robinson to retrieve the videos for him, and has him help install security cameras around his property when he realizes the killer knows personal details of how he lives. The killer is revealed to be Brady Hartsfield, an electronics store worker. As Hodges finds a tennis ball painted to look like Brady's smiley face insignia in his yard, Brady makes his rounds through Hodges' neighborhood at his second job as an ice cream vendor.
2	2	"On Your Mark"	Jack Bender	David E. Kelley	August 16, 2017
His paranoia heightening, Hodges almost shoots a teenager cutting through his yard in the middle of the night. Brady sends Hodges a letter trying to subtly convince him to commit suicide and inviting him to talk on a website called "Debbie's Blue Umbrella". The letter reminds him of Olivia Trelawney, the owner of the stolen Mercedes who committed suicide after also being written to by Brady, and so he visits her sister Janelle "Janey" Patterson, who promises to help him. Brady programs his annoying boss Anthony Frobisher's computer to destroy itself, burning Frobisher's face, and returns home to find that Hodges has messaged him on Blue Umbrella.
3	3	"Cloudy, With a Chance of Mayhem"	John Coles	A. M. Homes	August 23, 2017
As a child, Brady quietly observes his mother Deborah having sex, developing an attraction to her that she often reciprocates. In the present, Hodges reads over the letters Brady sent to Trelawney in which he guilted her into committing suicide, giving copies of them to his former partner Pete Dixon, who doubts their authenticity and advises him to drop the case. After Brady sends him another video encouraging him to kill himself, Hodges successfully provokes him by claiming the "real" Mercedes killer has been caught. Hodges and Janey discuss their true, vengeful motivations for trying to catch Brady, while Brady gets into bed with Deborah and lets her give him a handjob.
4	4	"Gods Who Fall"	Jack Bender	Dennis Lehane	August 30, 2017
As Hodges tries to figure out how Brady got access to Trelawney's car, Jerome realizes anyone fluent in tech could have stolen her car's RKS signal and used it to open it, contradicting the blame the police put on Trelawney for supposedly leaving her key in the ignition. Hodges and Janey have dinner together and end up having sex. Brady follows a man who harassed his coworker Lou Linklatter and kills him by using a homemade device that interferes with electronic signals, manipulating traffic lights and causing a truck to total the man's car. As he dies, Brady remembers he killed his younger brother, who sustained brain damage from almost choking to death on an apple slice, by pushing him down the basement stairs.
5	5	"The Suicide Hour"	Jack Bender	Bryan Goluboff	September 6, 2017
Brady deletes footage from Hodges' security cameras and breaks into his house, slicing up an apple and leaving it in his kitchen. He schemes to kill Jerome's dog with poisoned hamburger meat, but is spotted by Jerome before he can, leaving before he can be identified. Hodges visits Janey's mother with her to learn more about Trelawney before her suicide, and she explains that Brady convinced her to form a suicide pact that he did not follow through on. She recognizes him and tells Janey that he was one of the detectives that publicized the idea that Trelawney left her keys in her car, and Janey angrily stops speaking to him. Jerome tells Hodges about the incident with his dog, and Hodges crassly warns Jerome to stay away for his own safety. He video calls Brady on Blue Umbrella, who answers with his face and voice disguised. Brady decides to kill Hodges when he deduces his incestuous relationship with Deborah, and is forced to push her off when she tries to have sex with him.
6	6	"People in the Rain"	Jack Bender	Dennis Lehane	September 13, 2017
In 2005, Hodges allows his delinquent daughter Allie to go to jail after her repeated offenses, and now that she is sober, she no longer speaks to him. In the present, Janey tells him that her mother had a stroke and he goes to the hospital, where he meets Janey's OCD-afflicted cousin Holly Gibney. As Holly becomes anxious, he offers to take her to get food, where she explains that it was the "voices" Trelawney heard that ultimately killed her. Deborah tries to get sober and get her old job back, but an old associate attempts to sexually extort her. Brady interviews for the managerial position of his workplace but begins to fantasize about killing everyone around him, bombing the interview. He goes searching for Deborah, seeing Hodges and Holly return to the hospital, the former hugging Janey after her mother dies. He captures the RKS signal on Hodges' car. He returns to find Deborah waiting for him, and coaxes her into drinking to keep her docile.
7	7	"Willow Lake"	Jack Bender	Dennis Lehane	September 20, 2017
Hodges apologizes to Jerome and introduces him to Holly, putting them to work on going through Trelawney's computer and finding what killed her. Deborah searches through Brady's things while he is at work and finds the mask he wore during the massacre, although he bluffs it off when she confronts him. Hodges and Janey reconcile and reaffirm their desire to catch Brady, going to her mother's funeral together. During the procession, Brady plants a bomb in Hodges' car. Holly is scolded by her mother after the procession, so Hodges offers to drive her home. He gets a phone call, so Janey goes to get his car from the parking lot. As she drives it to them, Brady detonates the bomb, killing her.
8	8	"From the Ashes"	Laura Innes	Bryan Goluboff	September 27, 2017
Brady contacts Hodges on Blue Umbrella to confirm himself as Janey's killer while Deborah eats the poisoned hamburger, and Brady watches her die instead of risking calling 911. He drags her body upstairs and lays it in her bed. Hodges goes to talk to Allie for the first time in a decade to warn her about Brady, but she is clearly apprehensive to see him. Upset that her parents do not seem to care about Janey, Holly runs away to stay with Hodges and cracks the password on Trelawney's laptop, discovering with Jerome that it was programmed to play accusatory screams at random intervals and had a program installed that could control it remotely. Hodges turns it in to Dixon, who now believes the legitimacy of his pursuit of Brady. Hodges forces Holly to go back to her parents and promises that he will kill Brady. Brady sees a news report for the upcoming opening of an art center and lays next to Deborah's corpse, promising that he will "make you proud."
9	9	"Ice Cream, You Scream, We All Scream"	Kevin Hooks	Bryan Goluboff	October 4, 2017
Hodges and Dixon go to Brady's place of work and talk to Frobisher, asking which employee helped Trelawney with her technology. Hodges recognizes Brady as the ice cream man and gets his address, although he cannot immediately secure a search warrant. Holly and Jerome learn that there is a job fair in two days and theorize that Brady will likely attack there if he is planning something. Brady breaks into Frobisher's apartment and kills him. Dixon secures a search warrant for Brady's house and the SWAT team trip a countdown on his computers in the basement just as Hodges finds Brady curled up in bed with Deborah's corpse. The countdown triggers an explosion that sets the bedroom on fire. The next day, Hodges stares at the burnt corpses as Dixon assures him that they got Brady, and he mutters "maybe."
10	10	"Jibber-Jibber Chicken Dinner"	Jack Bender	Dennis Lehane	October 11, 2017
Convinced that Brady is not dead, Hodges learns that his basement had an escape tunnel built in and the manner in which Deborah was killed is inconsistent with how he framed it in a video he left for the police. Frobisher's superior calls the police when he does not show up to work, and they discover blood on his walls. Brady, having used Frobisher's corpse to fake his death, shaves his head and fits a wheelchair with a bomb. Hodges realizes Brady is going after people he cares about and is likely going to the art center opening, where Jerome is speaking. Brady is recognized at the opening by Lou, but he stabs her and makes his way into the crowd. Hodges finds her and she warns him about Brady, although he has a heart attack just as he confronts him. Before Brady can detonate the bomb, Holly uses a paperweight that belonged to Allie that Hodges gave her to bash his head in while Jerome disarms him. Some time later, Holly and Jerome are hailed as heroes while Hodges is prepped for release from the hospital. He spends his last day visiting the comatose Brady, telling him that he knows he will wake up one day and that he will be waiting to finish him off.

=== Season 2 (2018) ===
No. overall	No. in season	Title	Directed by	Written by	Original release date
11	1	"Missed You"	Jack Bender	Dennis Lehane	August 22, 2018
Felix Babineau, the neurosurgeon that saved Brady's life, starts to inject him with an experimental Chinese drug provided by his wife Cora, the head of marketing at a pharmaceutical corporation, as part of a trial. Over the course of a year, Hodges' visits to Brady become less frequent as he focuses more on his private investigator business, Finders Keepers, that he runs with Holly. While doing some yard work at Hodges' house, Pete suffers a fatal heart attack in his kitchen. Bill gives a heartfelt speech at the funeral held for his best friends passing. At the reception Hodges has a chat with his ex-wife about the recent difficulties life has thrown his way. No too long after, Hodges has a nightmare about Brady waking up and rising from Dixon's empty grave. With pressure mounting from both Cora and the threat of investigation if Brady dies, Babineau ups the dosage of Brady's drug. Hodges visits Brady and briefly considers killing him, but leaves before Brady's eyes start to move. Brady awakens in his basement, now full of objects that represent the most important aspects of his life, and attempts to turn his computers on.
12	2	"Let's Go Roaming"	Jack Bender	David E. Kelley	August 29, 2018
Hodges becomes disillusioned with his work after a couple of jobs that put down desperate, disadvantaged people. His ex-wife Donna, with whom he is talking again as well as Allie, advises him that his line of work may not be right for him. Brady's epileptic nurse, Sadie MacDonald, is prone to brief fits of catatonia when she stares too intensely at screens. She lapses into one of these when she stares at Brady's monitor, and he briefly enters her perspective. Sadie reports Brady looking at her to Babineau, who orders her to not tell anyone, but she ends up telling her friend and fellow nurse Maggie Wilmer, who spreads it around. District attorney Antonio Montez, eager to prosecute Brady, hears of this and visits his room, trying to elicit a reaction by causing him pain, but Brady only moves his eyes when he leaves. He again enters Sadie when she has another fit, making her walk around and noticing Hodges, having come to visit Brady after hearing the rumors. Brady makes her get a scalpel to kill Hodges with, but he is unwittingly saved by Wilmer, and Brady is ejected from Sadie's head.
13	3	"You Can Go Home Now"	Jack Bender	Mike Batistick	September 5, 2018
Hodges finds the scalpel in Brady's room, although Wilmer insists Sadie would not hurt anyone. Hodges visits Donna, disturbed by the idea that Sadie tried to kill him and Brady may have woken up, and they spend the night together. She advises him to stay away from the hospital. After Brady learns that Sadie is applying for a transfer, he tries to make her overdose an elderly patient on morphine, but Wilmer catches her and contacts Hodges. As Brady tries to get Sadie to run over Wilmer with her car, Hodges confronts and stops her. Realizing she is a liability, Brady makes her go up to the roof of the hospital and jump.
14	4	"Motherboard"	Jack Bender	Samantha Stratton	September 12, 2018
In the wake of Sadie's death, Babineau warns Wilmer to not tell Hodges about Brady's experimental treatment. Hodges insists to Montez that Brady is secretly conscious, but is told to stop visiting him. He gets Sadie's phone from her mother, which he has Jerome open and finds that she tried to tell her boyfriend about Brady's control over her. Lou's girlfriend moves out after her unwillingness to process the severe trauma of her stabbing begins to affect their relationship. She picks up a woman at a lesbian bar, but is arrested after she assaults a man who harasses them, being bailed out by her girlfriend, who leaves her. Brady takes control of Al Jursak, a volunteer who passes out books to patients, after he loses focus while playing a game on a tablet. He makes him deface the memorial for the Mercedes massacre and drive in front of Hodges' house, as inside, Hodges realizes Brady likely forced Sadie to kill herself.
15	5	"Andale"	Peter Weller	Alexis Deane & Sophie Owens-Bender	September 19, 2018
Montez notes that despite Brady's increased brain activity, he is not waking up, threatening to pull his support from Babineau and allow him to be investigated if he does not show any progress. Cora gives Babineau an experimental variant of the drug to use. Jerome hacks into the hospital's files on Brady to prove to Hodges that he is not conscious, but this only spurs him into getting Wilmer to try to steal from Babineau's office. She gets caught, and Montez warns him not to go back to the hospital or he will have his license for Finders Keepers pulled. Brady has Al kill Montez's dog, break into his house, and steal his gun. Montez meets with Hodges and reveals Al wrote a phrase on his patio with his dog's blood that he used while hurting Brady, offering to lay off him if he figures out who killed his dog.
16	6	"Proximity"	Laura Innes	Bryan Goluboff & Alexis Deane	September 26, 2018
Hodges searches Al's car and finds blood that he identifies as canine. He and Montez find the knife he used to kill the dog in his house and arrest him, despite Al's insistence that he did not do anything. Lou sneaks into Brady's room to ask him why he did not finish her off, and he manages to operate a text app that is connected to his brain activity, attempting to tell her that he wishes he killed her. She is escorted out before she can see, although Babineau notices. He asks Brady to cooperate with him, but Brady uses the app to curse him out. Babineau orders an MRI and finds that Brady's brain is functioning, and when Hodges hears of the drug testing through Wilmer, he tries to convince Babineau and Cora to let him provoke Brady into waking up. Cora demands Babineau find a way to wake Brady up, despite telling him that a test in China ended with the patients forcing people to kill themselves. Hodges visits Brady to try to provoke a reaction out of him, and later gets a text from an unknown number repeating something he said to Brady.
17	7	"Fell On Black Days"	Jack Bender	Samantha Stratton & Mike Batistick & Dennis Lehane (Note: Some releases credit Dennis Lehane as the sole writer of this episode.)	October 3, 2018
Donna and Hodges begin planning a trip to Ireland together. After Babineau fails to rouse Brady with brain surgery, he approaches Lou and asks for her help provoking him, but she turns him down. When Cora claims her company is sending her to China to continue her deal, he deduces that she is instead trying to abandon him and let him take any legal repercussions for their experiments. Al's brother bails him out of prison and he admits his belief that something is controlling him. They agree to get out of town, but Brady re-enters Al when he uses his tablet, making him cut his brother's throat. He breaks into Hodges' house with Montez's gun and waits for him to come home, attacking him and nearly beating him to death, but Ida is drawn to the commotion and distracts Al long enough for Hodges to shoot and kill him.
18	8	"Nobody Puts Brady in a Crestmore"	Jack Bender	Samantha Stratton & Mike Batistick & Dennis Lehane	October 10, 2018
Hodges is taken to the hospital for his injuries and eventually released. Montez gets the hospital administrator to approve Brady's transport to a less proper facility, but Babineau convinces Montez's superior that Brady will wake up and be properly put on trial after he moves his finger. Cora reveals to Babineau that she is pulling his backing from her company, leaving him to take the legal consequences of their actions. Brady fully wakes up as Hodges gets an uneasy feeling, going to the hospital to find his bed empty.
19	9	"Walk Like a Man"	Jack Bender	Dennis Lehane and David E. Kelley	October 17, 2018
Hodges assaults Babineau until he admits to his experiments on Brady. Brady breaks into Babineau's house and admits that he has started feeling regret over his crimes, while Babineau tells him he needs another dose of the drug in three days or he will die. He forces him and Cora to take him to the police station, and makes Cora kiss him before turning himself in. While insisting on his remorse to the man interrogating him, he offhandedly mentions Hodges almost killing him. Hodges is interviewed, and the detective speaking to him brings up his assault on Babineau and his role in the deaths of Sadie and Al. Hodges responds flippantly, and is arrested and put in a cell next to Brady. Cora and Babineau manage to spin Brady's awakening in their favor with the media.
20	10	"Fade to Blue"	Jack Bender	David E. Kelley & Jonathan Shapiro	October 24, 2018
Montez reveals that he put Hodges with Brady to see if he can provoke him. Hodges tries to strangle him and is eventually bailed out, but recognizes that the "real" Brady is still in there. Brady's hearing begins, where he and his attorney use the argument that he is legally incompetent to stand trial because his "Mr. Mercedes" personality committed the murders. Bill admits to Donna that the case of the Mercedes killings is and was the last thing he plans to do with his life as a cop. He requests of Lou that she talk to Brady and testify when he realizes Brady might go free, and she too recognizes that Brady is still himself. She recounts this in court, but pulls a 3D-printed gun and shoots Brady in the head with it. Some time later, Donna invites Hodges to see Allie with him next week, and he agrees. As she leaves, the new ice cream man pulls up in front of Hodges' house and a kid accidentally hits a tennis ball into his backyard. Hodges looks at it, and then paints Brady's insignia into the painting he is working on.

=== Season 3 (2019) ===
No. overall	No. in season	Title	Directed by	Written by	Original release date
21	1	"No Good Deed"	Jack Bender	David E. Kelley	September 10, 2019
Two men break into the house of John Rothstein, a famous author. Morris Bellamy, one of the robbers and a volatile fan of Rothstein's work, derides the ending he wrote for his most famous character, and Rothstein distracts him long enough to grab a gun and kill Bellamy's accomplice. Bellamy kills him and takes his money and several manuscripts, crashing his car as he escapes and winding up in the hospital. Hodges, a big fan of Rothstein, is devastated by the news of his death. He learns that Lou's case for killing Brady has gone to trial, and he tries to convince her to plead insanity while her attorney, Roland Finklestein, tries to get her charges dropped. Teenager Pete Saubers discovers Bellamy's crashed car while walking his dog, and takes the money and manuscripts. Bellamy returns to find the car empty, and assumes the man who took him to the hospital stole it, tracking him down and killing him.
22	2	"Madness"	Jack Bender	David E. Kelley and Jonathan Shapiro	September 17, 2019
The uncompromising judge of Lou's case, Bernard Raines, deems her mentally unfit to stand trial and orders her placed in a psychiatric hospital until she can be evaluated. Bellamy positions the man's body in his car to make him look like Rothstein's killer, although Montez, tipped off anonymously by Pete, examines the body and determines the man died by being shot instead of from a car crash. Pete buys a pair of expensive sneakers with Rothstein's money, and his depressed and short-tempered father Tom, a disabled survivor of the Mercedes killings, discovers them and suspects foul play. Pete hides the manuscripts in his wall after Tom nearly discovers them. Rothstein's ex-lover and the woman who gave Bellamy his location, Alma Lane, deduces that Bellamy killed him and encourages him to kill whoever has his money after having sex with him. Lou has a hallucination of Brady in her room in the hospital.
23	3	"Love Lost"	Jack Bender	Jonathan Shapiro and David E. Kelley	September 24, 2019
Alma begins to map out the area surrounding the crash and determines that passersby could not have seen it from the road, so it had to be a local walking through the woods that took the money. Bellamy's girlfriend Danielle catches him having sex with Alma, and he tries to get her to stay with him by stating that Alma has been grooming him since he was thirteen. She goes to Alma's house to confront her and notices the map on her wall, realizing she has something to do with Rothstein's murder, and Alma kills her and hides her body. Pete and Hodges separately go to a bookstore owned by Andrew Halliday, a criminal associate of Bellamy's, and inquire about Rothstein. Halliday show Bellamy video footage of both of them. Jerome pulls files on Rothstein from a library and he and Hodges discover a file of past affairs Rothstein kept, one of them being Ida, who admits to Hodges that she loved Rothstein. Despite hallucinating during her competency exam, Lou passes.
24	4	"Trial and Terror"	Jack Bender	David E. Kelley and Jonathan Shapiro	October 1, 2019
Bellamy and Alma identify Pete from Halliday's footage, and Bellamy breaks into his house but does not find anything. Jerome discovers that the man Bellamy killed was reported as taking someone to the hospital on the night of Rothstein's murder, although Bellamy used a fake identity while there. Raines disallows Finkelstein from using self-defense as a valid argument in Lou's trial, so he instead tries for involuntary manslaughter when the trial begins. Lou posits to him that they could call Holly as a witness, as she also attacked Brady and did not suffer any consequences.
25	5	"Great Balls of Fire"	Laura Innes	David E. Kelley and Jonathan Shapiro	October 8, 2019
The district attorney representing the state calls Hodges to the stand during Lou's trial, where she gets him to admit that he does not disapprove of her killing of Brady. The police begin visiting houses close to where Bellamy's car crashed, informing them of the missing money, and Pete's parents begin to suspect him due to his recent obsession with Rothstein. Alma innocently converses with Pete's mother Marjorie, suspecting she is upset about something, while Bellamy crosses paths with Hodges in court and gains his sympathy by mentioning that he is a survivor of the Mercedes killings. Alma gets rid of Danielle's body by carving it up and throwing the pieces into a woodchipper.
26	6	"Bad to Worse"	Jack Bender	David E. Kelley and Jonathan Shapiro	October 15, 2019
Holly takes the stand in court and performs extremely well, making way for Lou to give her own statement. She hallucinates multiple times during it, but manages to keep it together. Jerome visits the father of the man Rothstein killed, finding a picture of him and Bellamy together. Ida, Pete's English teacher, informs Hodges of his recent interest in Rothstein. Bellamy approaches Pete and offers to let him keep the money, wanting only Rothstein's manuscripts. Pete offers to sell the manuscripts to Halliday, but only gives him a page until he can prove that he has a buyer ready. Bellamy almost runs Pete off the road, prompting him to shoot Bellamy in the leg with a gun he purchased using Rothstein's money.
27	7	"The End of the Beginning"	Jack Bender	Jonathan Shapiro and David E. Kelley	October 22, 2019
Pete learns that Halliday secured a buyer, but is still hesitant to give him the manuscripts when Halliday tries to renegotiate the terms of their deal. After Halliday lies to Bellamy about Pete having the manuscripts, Alma visits the store and tortures him until he admits that Pete has them, and she kills him. Pete goes into hiding, while Hodges visits Tom and asks to talk to Pete when he comes home. Both Finklestein and the state attorney give their closing arguments, and Lou is found not guilty of first degree murder. Raines deems her guilty of second degree, but decides that the months she has spent in prison qualifies for her sentence, allowing her to serve the rest on probation.
28	8	"Mommy Deadest"	Michael J. Leone	David E. Kelley and Jonathan Shapiro	October 29, 2019
In the wake of her release from prison, Lou moves in with Holly temporarily and goes on a talk show with Finkelstein, where she expresses beliefs that she later admits to him were Brady's, still hallucinating him. Jerome discovers Alma's hate mail to Rothstein in his file on women. Pete goes to Ida for help but refuses to talk to Hodges, so he has Finkelstein go to him and offer to help him deal with the police. Pete refuses. Bellamy kidnaps Marjorie from the Saubers home after a struggle, and Alma ties her up in her shed. They contact Pete and Tom separately, warning them both not to go to the police and telling Pete to give them the manuscripts the next day or they will kill his mother.
29	9	"Crunch Time"	Jack Bender	Jonathan Shapiro and David E. Kelley	November 5, 2019
Holly is given ownership of Trelawney's Mercedes, which Hodges strongly disapproves of her keeping. He visits Tom to ask about Pete and notes his suspicious behavior. Jerome pieces together the evidence he has collected on Bellamy and his murders to uncover his identity, and Ida, Bellamy's former teacher, mentions to Hodges that he was rumored to be involved with an older woman. Pete gives Bellamy one of the manuscripts to keep Marjorie alive. After finding pictures of Rothstein and Pete in Bellamy's apartment, Hodges returns to Tom and gets him to admit everything he knows. He goes to visit Alma, but she bluffs him off. Just as Bellamy discovers a locket Danielle wore in the shed, Alma attacks him, and he kills her in the struggle.
30	10	"Burning Man"	Jack Bender	David E. Kelley and Jonathan Shapiro	November 12, 2019
Lou decides she needs to get a job and tries to get work at the electronics store she and Brady worked at, but is turned down. Jerome encourages Hodges to see the car as a way of releasing the memories attached to it, which he seems to accept. Allie unexpectedly comes home, informing Hodges that she is pregnant and asking to stay with him. He goes back to Alma's shed and finds it empty, Bellamy having hidden her body. After Hodges and Ida contact Bellamy and try to get him to see reason, he demands Pete meet him immediately or he will kill Marjorie. As Jerome traces Marjorie's phone, Pete and Bellamy meet, where Pete reveals that he will light the manuscripts on fire if Bellamy kills him or his mother. Bellamy decides to kill Marjorie, but Hodges arrives and shoots him, startling Pete into dropping his lighter on the manuscripts. Bellamy burns to death trying to read them, while Hodges sees an apparition of Rothstein watching them. The Saubers family reunites, Holly returns the paperweight she used to stop Brady to Allie while she moves in with Hodges, and Lou takes Brady's old job as an ice cream vendor, now at peace.

== Production ==
=== Development ===
In 2015, Sonar Entertainment optioned the screen rights to Stephen King's novel Mr. Mercedes with the intent of developing into a limited series. David E. Kelley was set to write the series while Jack Bender would direct. Executive producers were expected to include Kelley, Bender, Marty Bowen, Wyck Godfrey, and Gene Stein. Production companies involved with the series were to include Temple Hill Entertainment and Sonar Entertainment.

On May 25, 2016, it was announced that Audience had given the production a series order for a first season consisting of ten episodes. The previously announced creative team was still expected to be involved. In addition to writing and executive producing, David E. Kelley was also announced to be serving as the series' showrunner. Additional executive producers announced included Christopher Long, Bart Peters, Jenna Glazier, and Tom Patricia. On May 11, 2017, it was announced that the series would premiere on August 9, 2017.

On October 10, 2017, the Audience Network renewed the series for a second season consisting of ten episodes. It will be based on the three novels in the Bill Hodges trilogy, Mr. Mercedes, Finders Keepers and End of Watch. On April 15, 2018, it was announced that the second season would premiere on August 22, 2018. On November 19, 2018, it was announced that Audience had renewed the series for a third season consisting of ten episodes, which premiered on September 10, 2019.

In May 2020, Audience was discontinued, with no indication of whether the show had been officially canceled or that it would return for a fourth season.

=== Casting ===
Alongside the series order announcement, it was confirmed that Brendan Gleeson and Anton Yelchin had been cast in the series' two lead roles. Following Yelchin's death in June 2016, his role was recast with Harry Treadaway assuming the part. In December 2016, it was announced that Kelly Lynch and Ann-Margret had been cast in the series. In January 2017, it was reported that Jharrel Jerome, Justine Lupe, and Breeda Wool, Scott Lawrence, Robert Stanton, and Ann Cusack had joined the main cast, that Mary-Louise Parker was cast a recurring character, and that Ann-Margret's role had been recast with Holland Taylor following an illness in Ann-Margret's family. On April 25, 2017, it was reported that Stephen King would have a cameo in the series. In January 2018, it was announced that Jack Huston, Maximiliano Hernandez, and Tessa Ferrer had been cast as series regulars in season two. In March 2019, Kate Mulgrew, Brett Gelman, and Natalie Paul joined the series for the third season. On April 25, 2019, Meg Steedle had been cast in a recurring role for the third season.

=== Filming ===
In February 2017, principal photography for the first season began in Charleston, South Carolina. That month, filming took place in the Wagener Terrace area of the city as well as at the Upper King Street restaurant Little Jack's Tavern. Filming concluded for the first season by the end of May 2017. In January 2018, Audience announced production for season two would commence the following month in South Carolina.

During filming on March 2, 2019, special effects technician Mike Wilks survived a near-electrocution on set.

== Release ==
=== Marketing ===
On May 8, 2017, Audience released a series of "first look" images from the series. On June 5, 2017, Audience released a "behind-the-scenes" video for the series featuring interviews with the cast and crew. The following day, the first teaser trailer for the series was released. By the end of the month, Audience released a set of promotional photographs featuring the series' main cast.

On July 19, 2018, the series held a panel at San Diego Comic-Con in San Diego, California to promote season two. The panel featured executive producer and director Jack Bender as well as series stars Jack Huston, Max Hernandez, Breeda Wool, Justine Lupe, and Nancy Travis. On July 30, 2018, the official trailer for season two was released.

=== Distribution ===
The series airs on RTÉ1 in Ireland, on Canal+ in Poland, and on Starzplay in the United Kingdom. The first three seasons of Mr. Mercedes were picked up in September 2020 by streaming service Peacock.

== Reception ==
Critical response of Mr. Mercedes
Season	Rotten Tomatoes	Metacritic
1	83% (29 reviews)	71 (17 reviews)
2	100% (11 reviews)	76 (4 reviews)

=== Critical response ===
The first season of Mr. Mercedes got a positive response from critics. On the review aggregation website Rotten Tomatoes, the first season holds an 83% approval rating with an average rating of 6.42 out of 10 based on 29 reviews. The website's critical consensus reads, "Mr. Mercedes propels its tense, creepy narrative with quick-witted dialogue, strong characters, and terrifying surprises." Metacritic, which uses a weighted average, assigned the season a score of 71 out of 100 based on 17 critics, indicating "generally favorable reviews".

The second season also received a positive response from critics. On Rotten Tomatoes, the second season holds a 100% approval rating with an average rating of 7 out of 10 based on 11 reviews, with the critical consensus reading, "Mr. Mercedes gains a new, supernatural dimension in a rollicking second season that pits the talents of Brendan Gleeson and Harry Treadaway against each other, generating enough sparks to dazzle mystery aficionados and horror buffs alike." Metacritic assigned the season a score of 76 out of 100 based on 4 critics, indicating "generally favorable reviews".

=== Awards and nominations ===
Year	Award	Category	Nominee(s)	Result	Ref.
2018	Irish Film and Television Awards	Best Actor in a Lead Role – Drama	Brendan Gleeson	Nominated	
2018	Saturn Awards	Best Action-Thriller Television Series	Mr. Mercedes	Nominated	
2019	Satellite Awards	Best Actor – Television Series Drama	Brendan Gleeson	Won	
2019	Satellite Awards	Best Television Series – Drama	Mr. Mercedes	Nominated	
2019	Saturn Awards	Best Action-Thriller Television Series	Mr. Mercedes	Nominated	
2020	Satellite Awards	Best Actor in a Drama / Genre Series	Brendan Gleeson	Nominated	
2020	Satellite Awards	Best Drama Series	Mr. Mercedes	Nominated	

== Related series ==
The character of Holly Gibney that was first introduced in the Bill Hodges trilogy was one of the main characters in King's 2018 novel The Outsider. That novel was adapted for the 2020 miniseries by HBO, with the Gibney character portrayed by Cynthia Erivo.
