= If It Bleeds =

2020 collection of four novellas by Stephen King

- First U.S. edition cover.
- Author: Stephen King
- Audio read by: Will Patton; Danny Burstein; Steven Weber
- Cover artist: Will Staehle
- Language: English
- Genre: Supernatural fiction, horror, crime fiction
- Publisher: Scribner
- Publication date: April 21, 2020
- Publication place: United States
- Media type: Print (hardcover)
- Pages: 448
- ISBN: 978-1-9821-3797-7
- OCLC: 1122461355
- Preceded by: The Bazaar of Bad Dreams
- Followed by: You Like It Darker

If It Bleeds is a collection of four previously unpublished novellas by American writer Stephen King. The stories in the collection are titled "Mr. Harrigan's Phone", "The Life of Chuck", "If It Bleeds", and "Rat". It was released on April 28, 2020.

The audiobook is read by Will Patton, Danny Burstein, and Steven Weber.

== Novellas ==
=== "Mr. Harrigan's Phone" ===
Craig gets a job working for the retired Mr. Harrigan, who gives Craig a winning lottery ticket. Craig then buys Mr. Harrigan a cell phone using some of the money won from the lottery ticket. Eventually, Mr. Harrigan dies and later, Craig leaves a voicemail on Mr. Harrigan's old phone about a bully. The bully is later found to have died by an accident. Craig then decides not to use the phone with Mr. Harrigan's number and switches to a newer model. Later, after a drunk driver accidentally kills Craig's favorite teacher and receives a light sentence, Craig calls Mr. Harrigan from his old phone and leaves a voicemail wishing the driver dead. The drunk driver is then found to have died by suicide; following this, Craig throws his old phone into a lake.

=== "The Life of Chuck" ===
The story is split into three acts given in reverse chronological order. Act 3 comes first. They are given in reverse chronological order here:

- In Act 3: "Thanks, Chuck", Marty Anderson drives home and sees a billboard showing an accountant sitting at a desk, underneath it says "39 Great Years! Thanks, Chuck" as the world appears to be slowly ending. That evening, as Marty visits his ex-wife Felicia, he notices Chuck's image appearing everywhere. In a hospital, Chuck is dying surrounded by his family. Marty and Felicia see the stars disappearing, then blackness.
- In Act 2, "Buskers", Chuck, while on a business trip, sees a drummer busking and starts dancing. A young girl joins him, dancing with Chuck as a crowd surrounds them. After dancing, Chuck suffers a bad headache and walks back to his hotel.
- In Act 1, "I Contain Multitudes", Chuck is orphaned and is brought up by his paternal grandparents, where his love of dancing develops. His grandparents always keep their house's cupola locked, but eventually Chuck unlocks the room and sees himself as an adult dying of a brain tumor. He resolves to live his life fully despite suspecting he will die young.

=== "If It Bleeds" ===
Holly Gibney of the Finders Keepers detective agency sees footage of a horrific school bombing on TV. She suspects that there is something odd about the reporter Chet Ondowsky who was first on the scene and that he may be another supernatural "outsider". Holly makes contact with an elderly former policeman who believes that the reporter feeds on the fear of traumatic emotions, and Holly realizes that Ondowsky must be stopped. She, Barbara, and Jerome must all work together to take down Ondowsky.

Gibney previously appeared in King's Bill Hodges trilogy (Mr. Mercedes, Finders Keepers and End of Watch), The Outsider, and subsequently appeared in the novels Holly (2023) and Never Flinch (2025).

=== "Rat" ===
Writer and academic Drew Larson has published several short stories but has been unable to complete a novel. Then he has the inspiration to write a Western thriller and is determined to complete it. He sets out for an old isolated family cabin and begins to write, but bad weather and sickness set in. Drew strikes a sinister bargain with a rat; it offers to get rid of his writer's block in exchange for the death of one of Larson's loved ones. Thinking that his imagination is getting the best of him, he agrees and goes about his day. Finally, when the storm clears Larson returns home to his family. The novel is successful, his friend recovers from a previous illness but is then killed with his wife in an automobile accident. One night, he has a final conversation with the rat before it disappears.

== Reception ==
USA Today's Brian Truitt awarded the collection three and a quarter stars out of four, saying, "King still owns the fright business like none other, [and] the iconic author will keep you up late at night engrossed in four tales about our dreams and our frailties."

Publishers Weekly said of the release, "The four never-before-published novellas in this collection represent horror master King at his finest, using the weird and uncanny to riff on mortality, the price of creativity, and the unpredictable consequences of material attachments."

Kirkus Reviews summed up the release as "Vintage King: a pleasure for his many fans and not a bad place to start if you're new to him."

== Film adaptations ==
=== Mr. Harrigan's Phone ===
On July 10, 2020, Deadline Hollywood reported that Netflix had acquired the film rights to Mr. Harrigan's Phone, produced by Blumhouse Productions and Ryan Murphy. It premiered on October 5, 2022, to mixed reviews. Mr. Harrigan is portrayed by Donald Sutherland.

=== The Life of Chuck ===
On the same day Mr. Harrigan's Phone was acquired by Netflix, The Life of Chuck was optioned by Darren Aronofsky's production company, Protozoa Pictures. Three years later, the project was acquired by Intrepid Pictures. Mike Flanagan wrote and directed the film, with the script completed prior to the 2023 Writers Guild of America strike. Tom Hiddleston portrayed Chuck and Mark Hamill portrayed Albie. FilmNation Entertainment managed international sales.

=== Others ===
In 2020, Rat was optioned by Ben Stiller, with intentions to produce, star and direct. The Stiller project did not move forward, and in 2025, a movie adaptation by producer Jay Van Hoy was announced, with Isaac Ezban attached as the director.
