= Rothstein =

Surname list

Rothstein is a Germanic-language (German, Yiddish) surname of several possible origins: toponymic surname from a place with the same name near Merseburg; from a Germanic personal name, Hrodstein (hrod- (Hróð-), "fame", "glory", meaning "famous stone"). Ashkenazic Jewish / Yiddish: ornamental compound surname: rot 'red' + Stein 'stone', akin to "Rotstein".

Notable people with the surname include:

- Andrew Rothstein (1898–1994), Russian-British journalist
- Arnold Rothstein (1882–1928), New York businessman and gambler, who became a famous kingpin of organized crime
- Arthur Rothstein (1915–1985), American photographer
- Esther Rothstein (1913–1998), American lawyer
- Joseph Rothstein (1917–1966), the President of East Meadow Jewish Center
- Bo Rothstein (born 1954), Swedish political scientist
- Edward Rothstein, American music critic and composer
- Henry Rothstein, academic at King's College London
- Israel Rothstein, birth name of Israel Eliraz (1936–2016), Israeli poet
- Jesse Rothstein, economics professor at the University of California, Berkeley
- Marshall Rothstein (born 1940), Puisne Justice of the Supreme Court of Canada
- Mikael Rothstein (born 1961), Danish writer and historian
- Ron Rothstein (born 1942), basketball coach
- Theodore Rothstein (1871–1953), Soviet emigre journalist and writer in Great Britain, later ambassador of the Soviet Union
- Richard Rothstein (academic), American historian and social scientist

== Fictional characters ==
- Albert Rothstein, a comic book superhero
- John Rothstein, a writer from Stephen King's novel Finders Keepers
- Sam "Ace" Rothstein, a character in the film Casino
- Alexander Rothstein, a character in the German film Haps

== See also ==
- Rostagnus
