= Berenguier =

Berenguier is a given name and surname. Notable people with the name include:

- Berenguier de Palazol (fl. 1160–1209), Catalan troubadour
- Berenguier de Poizrengier (fl. after 1195), French troubadour and poet
- Rostaing Berenguier, 14th-century French troubadour and poet
