= Rostand =

Rostand may refer to:

== People ==
- André Rostand, Malagasy politician
- Aura Rostand (1899–1957), Nicaraguan poet
- Edmond Rostand (1868–1918), French poet and dramatist
- Jean Rostand (1894–1977), French biologist and philosopher, son of Edmond
- Maurice Rostand (1883–1946), French playwright, son of Edmond
- Rostand Melaping (born 1978), Cameroonian judoka

== Places ==
- Rostand Island, an island in Antarctica named for Jean Rostand

== See also ==
- Rostagnus, for the given name Rostand
