= Rostan =

Rostan is a French surname. Notable people with the surname include:

- Georges Rostan (1938–2020), French actor
- Léon Rostan (1790–1866), French doctor
- Marc Rostan (born 1963), French racing driver

== See also ==
- Rostagnus, for the given name Rostan
