= Rostagnus =

Rostagnus is a Latinization of a Germanic given name common in the Middle Ages, especially in Occitania. It derives from Proto-Germanic *Hrōþi- "fame" and *stainaz "stone". It is attested in the Old High German form Hruodstein.

Numerous other Latin spellings are known: Rostandus, Rustandus, Rostaignus, Rostangnus, Rostannus, Rystagnus and Restagnus. In vernacular documents in England and Romance-speaking areas, the name appears as Rostaing, Rostand, Rostan, Rustand, Rustant, Rustan, Rodstein, Rostein, Rostain, Rostang and Rostagne. The Occitan form is Rostanh and the Catalan is Rostany.

Persons with this name include:

- Rostany, first count of Girona (785–801)
- Rostaing I, archbishop of Arles (870–913)
- Rostaing, bishop of Uzès (945)
- Rostan de Soler (fl. 1216–43), Gascon statesman
- Rostanh de Merguas (late 13th century), Provençal troubadour
- Rostaing de la Capre, archbishop of Arles (1286–1303)
- Rostaing Berenguier (early 14th century), Provençal troubadour and knight
- Rostand Melaping (born 1978), Cameroonian judoka

== See also ==
- For surnames with the same etymology, see
  - Rothstein
  - Rostand (disambiguation)
  - Rostan
  - Rostaing
