= Sarah Maitland =

Sarah Maitland may refer to:

- Sara Maitland, misspelling
- Sarah Maitland, character in The Outsider (King novel)
