= The Outsider (miniseries) =

2020 American television miniseries

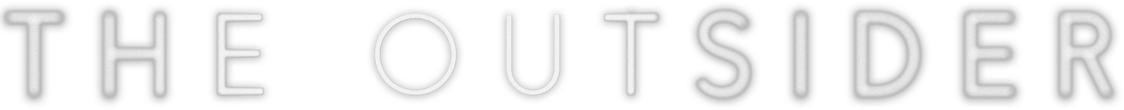
- Genre: Crime drama; Horror; Mystery; Psychological thriller
- Based on: The Outsider by Stephen King
- Developed by: Richard Price
- Starring: Ben Mendelsohn; Bill Camp; Jeremy Bobb; Julianne Nicholson; Mare Winningham; Paddy Considine; Yul Vazquez; Jason Bateman; Marc Menchaca; Cynthia Erivo
- Music by: Daniel Bensi; Saunder Jurriaans
- Country of origin: United States
- Original language: English
- No. of episodes: 10

Production
- Executive producers: Richard Price; Jason Bateman; Andrew Bernstein; Marty Bowen; Michael Costigan; Jack Bender (pilot only)
- Producers: Ben Mendelsohn; Katharine Werner (pilot only); David Auge
- Cinematography: Igor Martinovic; Rasmus Heise; Zak Mulligan; Kevin McKnight
- Editors: Leo Trombetta; Tad Dennis; Daniel James Scott; Dorian Harris
- Running time: 50–60 minutes
- Production companies: Aggregate Films; Temple Hill Entertainment; Pieface Inc.; Civic Center Media; MRC Television

Original release
- Network: HBO
- Release: January 12 – March 8, 2020

Related
- Mr. Mercedes

The Outsider is an American television miniseries based on the 2018 novel by Stephen King, adapted for television by Richard Price. It was ordered to series on December 3, 2018, after being optioned as a miniseries by MRC in June 2018. It premiered on HBO on January 12, 2020. It stars Ben Mendelsohn, Cynthia Erivo, Bill Camp, Paddy Considine, Julianne Nicholson, and Jason Bateman (who also directed the first two episodes).

In November 2020, HBO passed on a second season, and production company MRC intended to shop the series to other outlets. King said that scripts for a second season were written, and the cast and crew expressed interest in continuing the series.

== Cast ==
=== Main ===
- Ben Mendelsohn as Ralph Anderson, a detective in the Cherokee City police department. Ralph is a recovering alcoholic struggling to cope with the loss of his son, Derek, who died of cancer years before the show's events, and has a jaded and skeptical attitude towards the cases he investigates.
- Jason Bateman as Terry Maitland, a Little League baseball coach who is arrested for the murder of a young boy, Frankie Peterson.
- Bill Camp as Howie Salomon, the Maitlands' trusted lawyer, who comes at odds with Ralph over the investigation before assisting on the case.
- Jeremy Bobb as Alec Pelley, a private investigator with Howard's firm who refers the detectives to Holly Gibney.
- Julianne Nicholson as Glory Maitland, Terry's wife, who struggles to raise her children amidst the stigma placed on her family after her husband's arrest.
- Mare Winningham as Jeannie Anderson, Ralph's wife and a caseworker who befriends Glory and helps Ralph uncover the true scope of the case.
- Paddy Considine as Claude Bolton, an employee at the Peach Crease, a local bar and strip club. Claude is an ex-convict and recovering addict who is initially interviewed as a witness in the Maitland investigation before becoming more entangled in the case himself.
- Yul Vazquez as Yunis Sablo, a GBI lieutenant who works on the case with Ralph and a practicing Catholic who is more open to believing in paranormal events.
- Marc Menchaca as Jack Hoskins, a hard-nosed, alcoholic police detective and veteran who pushes himself into the Maitland case.
- Cynthia Erivo as Holly Gibney, a private detective with savant-like memory and perceptive capabilities who is called in to consult on the Maitland investigation.

=== Recurring ===
- Max Beesley as Seale Bolton, Claude's brother, also an ex-convict who works as a construction worker in Tennessee.
- Derek Cecil as Andy Katcavage, a former police detective and now head of the mall security in Dayton, Ohio, who helps Holly investigate crimes similar to the Maitland case and later begins a relationship with her.
- Summer Fontana as Maya Maitland, Terry and Glory's older daughter.
- Scarlett Blum as Jessa Maitland, Terry and Glory's younger daughter who begins experiencing paranormal visions.
- Frank Deal as Fred Peterson, the father of the initial victim, Frankie Peterson.
- Dayna Beilenson as Mildred Patterson
- Hettienne Park as Tamika Collins, a detective in the police force and an old acquaintance of Jack Hoskins.
- Michael Esper as Kenneth Hayes, the local district attorney who wants speedy justice in the Maitland investigation to help his chances of reelection.
- Claire Bronson as Joy Peterson, Frankie Peterson's mother.
- Michael H. Cole as Herbert Parker
- Marc Fajardo as Myron Lazar
- Margo Moorer as Libby Stanhope
- Duncan E. Clark as Frankie Peterson, a young boy found brutally murdered in the woods.
- Joshua Whichard as Ollie Peterson, Frankie's older brother.
- Wes Watson as Derek Anderson, Ralph and Jeannie's son who died of cancer.
- Diany Rodriguez as María Canales, a woman from Harlem falsely convicted of murdering a young boy in a case similar to Terry's, who is now serving prison time on Rikers Island.
- Suehyla El-Attar as Angela Kelly
- Martin Bats Bradford as Heath Hofstadter, a nurse who was convicted of murdering a pair of young sisters despite protesting innocence, in a case similar to Terry's.
- Jakob Gruntfest as Merlin Cassidy
- Nicholas Pryor as Peter Maitland, Terry's father who lives in a psychiatric institution.
- Genevieve Hudson-Price as Skye
- Susanna Guzman as Idilys Castro
- Drez Ryan as Tracey Powell
- Steve Witting as Herbert Zucker
- Carlos Navarro as Detective Healy

== Production ==
The series was announced in June 2018, with Richard Price hired to adapt the Stephen King novel. HBO officially commissioned the series in December, with Ben Mendelsohn cast in the lead while serving as a producer. Jason Bateman executive produced and also stars in the series.

In January 2019, the core main cast was set, seeing the additions of Cynthia Erivo, Bill Camp, Mare Winningham, Paddy Considine, Julianne Nicholson, Yul Vazquez, Jeremy Bobb and Marc Menchaca. Hettienne Park and Michael Esper appear in recurring roles.

Richard Price took considerable liberties in adapting the novel to television. In the series, Ralph Anderson is grieving the death of his son, who is alive in the book. "I needed Ralph to have more of a personal stake in the loss of children," Price told Variety. The pace of the series is also considerably different; the first two episodes cover the first half of the novel, while the remaining eight episodes cover the second half.

The series was shot in the Atlanta metropolitan area, including at Emory University and locations in Canton, Decatur, Lawrenceville, Norcross and Stockbridge.

== Episodes ==
No.	Title	Directed by	Teleplay by	Original release date	U.S. viewers (millions)
1	"Fish in a Barrel"	Jason Bateman	Richard Price	January 12, 2020	0.724
In Cherokee City, Georgia, the mutilated corpse of a young boy, Frank Peterson, is found covered in saliva and human bite marks. Local detective Ralph Anderson quickly identifies strong evidence pointing to Little League coach Terry Maitland, including testimony from multiple witnesses and security camera footage. Ralph, whose own late son was coached by Terry, is enraged, and has him publicly arrested at a Little League game. Terry insists on his innocence, and his wife, Glory, promptly calls their family lawyer, Howard Salomon. Alec Pelley, a private investigator hired by Salomon, tracks down evidence that Terry was at an out-of-town conference at the time of the murder, including news footage of Terry speaking at the conference and Terry's fingerprints at the venue. Both sides are left with extremely decisive but contradictory evidence. Salomon is certain Terry will be vindicated, but Terry is left in jail waiting for his arraignment. Meanwhile, the Peterson family disintegrates, with Frank's mother, Joy, suffering an emotional breakdown that escalates into a fatal heart attack. A hooded figure with a grotesquely deformed face lingers outside the Maitlands' house, and Glory finds her younger daughter suffering from apparent nightmares of a man in her room telling her "bad things".
2	"Roanoke"	Jason Bateman	Richard Price	January 12, 2020	0.603
Ralph meets Terry at the prison and expresses uncertainty about his decision to have Terry arrested so publicly. The next day, Joy dies at the hospital after collapsing at home. As Terry arrives at the courthouse for his arraignment, Frank's teenage brother opens fire, injuring others and fatally wounding Terry before being killed by Ralph. Terry insists on his innocence before dying. The deformed man is shown watching the aftermath. Fred Peterson, the sole surviving member of the family, attempts suicide by hanging, but he is only left comatose. Ralph is put on leave, and hot-headed detective Jack Hoskins is called to substitute. The case continues to gnaw at Ralph, who investigates the van used by the killer and identifies that it was in the same location as the Maitlands during a family trip to Dayton, Ohio, earlier that year. While questioning a reluctant Glory about that trip, Ralph learns from her older daughter that Terry received a small cut on his wrist, supposedly from a male nurse at his father's nursing home. A farmhand discovers a pile of discarded clothes in a barn that match those that Terry was seemingly seen wearing on security footage after the murder.
3	"Dark Uncle"	Andrew Bernstein	Richard Price	January 19, 2020	0.858
A disgruntled Jack is sent to join the investigation at the barn where the clothing was discovered. After wasting time, he shows up late to the empty barn, where he is attacked by an unseen apparition. Over the following days, he develops strange marks on his neck, and his behavior grows increasingly erratic. Ralph goes to Howie Salomon and Alec Pelley with the information he has gathered on the van and the Maitlands' trip to Dayton. They contact eccentric savant investigator Holly Gibney to backtrack Terry's movements during the trip. Meanwhile, Jessa Maitland convinces her mother (Glory) to let Ralph visit so she can relay a message. Jessa tells Ralph that the man she is seeing has a message for Ralph: "Stop, or something bad will happen." When Ralph tries to probe further, Glory refuses to let Ralph talk to Jessa anymore. Ralph's wife is able to convince Glory to let her help with Jessa's "nightmares." Jessa tells all of them that the man she is seeing is transforming every time she sees him and that Ralph should be the one that is scared. As part of her investigation, Holly Gibney attempts to speak with Terry's father at his nursing home. During the visit, Holly discovers that a male nurse at the institution was convicted of murdering two young girls around the time of the visit. The nurse is shown in prison concurrently, where he commits suicide to avoid being killed by another inmate.
4	"Que Viene el Coco"	Andrew Bernstein	Richard Price	January 26, 2020	0.988
Holly's investigation uncovers a pattern – individuals in different cities across the country who are accused of murdering children, with strong forensic evidence incriminating them for the killings, while equally strong evidence shows they were somewhere else at the time of the killings. In the aftermath of each crime a series of suicides and revenge kills occur in the families of both victims and accused. Holly and Ralph theorize that there is one killer who becomes a perfect doppelganger of various unassuming targets, carrying out the horrific crimes in the target's form while the target is away. The doppelganger who committed the murder scratches a stranger before assuming their form and repeating the pattern in this new target's city. Terry is the latest target, with Heath Hofstadter, the nurse in Dayton, preceding him, along with a woman in Harlem named Maria Caneles preceding Hofstadter. After meeting Caneles, Holly is approached by a woman named Idilys Castro, who explains her belief to Holly that the perpetrator is a boogeyman who feeds on the suffering of its victims and their families. An increasingly erratic Jack leaves furniture and a dead animal in the woods for the entity who controls him and communicates with him. Ralph identifies on security footage that local bouncer Claude Bolton was scratched on his wrist by Maitland's doppelganger the night of the Peterson murder. The boy who carjacked the van admits to Ralph that he saw a man take the parked van in Dayton but was afraid to mention him before. He draws a picture of the man, bearing a clear resemblance to the figure seen around crime scenes in Cherokee City.
5	"Tear-Drinker"	Igor Martinović	Richard Price	February 2, 2020 (Note: The episode was first made available on January 31, 2020, through HBO's digital platform.)	0.567
In Cherokee City, the hooded figure appears to Ralph's wife Jeannie, relaying a warning to Ralph that they will both be killed if he continues his investigation. Ralph brushes this off as a nightmare of Jeannie's, but he becomes unsettled when her drawing of the intruder closely resembles the boy's drawing of the man who took the van. In Dayton, Holly theorizes about the shape-shifting creature killing children. She visits the cemeteries of both Heath Hofstadter and his alleged victims, finding dilapidated buildings nearby and photographing them. She believes that the creature would live in these buildings to feed on the suffering of those visiting the graves. She also meets a man associated with Heath, who later commits suicide-by-cop and is shown to have the same sores on his neck as Jack. Holly suggests Ralph take photographs around Terry's grave, and Ralph's partner Yunis Sablo notices that the barn where the clothes were found is right by the cemetery. Holly opts to drive back to Cherokee City to debrief Ralph, Howie, and Alec. The night before, she invites Andy Katcavage, a Dayton security officer (and former police detective) with whom she's had a courtship, up to her hotel room. Holly leaves the next morning, but her car breaks down on the way out of Dayton. Andy finds her notes on the investigation and researches them. Continually terrorized by the unseen entity, Jack offers to help Ralph with his case.
6	"The One About the Yiddish Vampire"	Karyn Kusama	Jessie Nickson-Lopez	February 9, 2020	0.792
Holly returns to Cherokee City to report her findings. She gives evidence of how all the murders are connected and that she believes "an entity" is responsible for the killings. She maintains that the priority is to find the person most recently infected by it and to isolate them. This is received poorly by the police, especially Glory, who berates them all for their incompetence and for even entertaining such a ludicrous explanation. The entity punishes Jack for failing to stop Holly's investigation by appearing in the form of his deceased mother and severely beating him throughout his apartment. Jeannie invites Holly to stay with her and Ralph at their house, where Jeannie increasingly believes in the entity due to the matching descriptions and Holly's theories. Ralph is still skeptical until Holly uses a blue light against the chair where the entity was sitting in Jeannie's dream and finds the same residue found in the barn, as well as fingerprints. Holly now believes the entity is "shedding" as it transforms into its next human form. She theorizes it must use a host while it is vulnerable to do its bidding. Jack invites Holly to visit the barn where Terry's clothes were found, but while driving, she notices the rash on the back of his neck. Realizing her imminent danger, she tries to return to town, but Jack tells her to continue driving.
7	"In the Pines, In the Pines"	Daina Reid	Dennis Lehane	February 16, 2020	1.077
Ralph and Alec become suspicious about the simultaneous disappearances of Holly and Jack. They search Jack's apartment and find his blood everywhere, eventually tracking Holly and Jack's phones to the same location. Holly, meanwhile, manages to trick and abandon Jack at a gas station and drive away. Jack considers suicide, but he cannot go through with it. Glory, after experiencing more difficulties on her first day back at work, finally decides to file a civil lawsuit against everyone whom her attorney Howard suggests. Claude, feeling discomfort in a way he cannot explain, quits his job. When Holly reunites with the others (including Andy, who arrives in Georgia), Yunis shares Claude's situation with her, and Holly angrily confronts Ralph about not revealing it to her earlier. She realizes that Claude's relevance to the case only reinforces her theories, while Ralph continues to struggle with reconciling the unexplainable nature of the events. Later that night, Holly awakens from a nightmare in which Jack kills her.
8	"Foxhead"	J. D. Dillard	Richard Price	February 23, 2020	0.978
Jack lures away the surveillance team surrounding his apartment, allowing him to enter his home and retrieve a large weapons cache, and he drives away. Claude, meanwhile, travels to Cecil, Tennessee, to stay with his criminally stupid brother Seale. Holly vows to follow him so he can be both protected and potentially, exonerated. Ralph, Yunis, and Andy agree to join her. To evade the police, Jack murders a local fisherman (who the entity, currently transforming into Claude, then consumes) and steals his car. Soon after Claude arrives in Tennessee, he is taken into custody by local police who have coordinated with the investigators to protect him. Claude, Seale, and the investigators converge on the Bolton house so they can keep track of Claude. Concurrently, the mid-transformation entity travels to a local cave festival and attempts to lure a young boy so it can eat him. Other festivalgoers manage to stop the entity, however, with the boy's grandfather getting in a scuffle with it before it flees. Meanwhile, Alec and Howard arrive to assist with the investigation. The next morning, local police arrive at the house looking for Claude. They meet with Ralph and Holly, showing them recorded footage of the festival scuffle, which reveals the entity to have an only slightly deformed version of Claude's face. Ralph and Holly realize the entity is close by.
9	"Tigers and Bears"	Charlotte Brändström	Dennis Lehane	March 1, 2020	1.185
Because the entity's powers allow it to access any information Claude knows, the group decides to distract him while they search for it. The investigators manage to arrange interviews with the boy who had been lured by the entity and with the boy's grandfather. The boy explains the entity's description of a potential bear cave, while the grandfather describes being unsettled by the entity's face seeming mask-like. A parallel story during the episode, about a father searching for his two boys, is revealed to occur over 70 years earlier, in 1947, when the bear cave collapsed. The 34-man search party, which included some of Claude and Seale Bolton's ancestors, starved to death after being trapped inside the cave. Due to the location's tragic history, which also involves the Bolton family, the investigators conclude that this is where the entity is hiding. Additionally, while this is occurring, D.A. Hayes learns of another young boy who has been killed in a manner similar to Frankie. Ralph, Holly, Yunis, Alec, and Andy travel to the cave. Seale, recklessly yet intentionally, reveals the plan to Claude, immediately alerting the entity to the situation; the entity forces Jack into action. Once the five investigators arrive at the site, Jack (a trained sniper from his military past) uses his sniper rifle and begins a deadly round of shots, one of which kills Alec.
10	"Must/Can't"	Andrew Bernstein	Richard Price	March 8, 2020	1.371
Howard, Claude, and Seale arrive at the scene; Seale charges Jack and is promptly shot dead. Andy attempts to drive away for help, but Jack shoots him as well, then shoots the gas tank of the vehicle Andy was driving. Howard tries to rescue Andy, but Jack ignites the gasoline, killing them both. When the entity commands Jack to kill Holly, Jack refuses. He approaches the others, begs them to kill the entity, then commits suicide. Ralph and Holly enter the cave and find the entity, who expresses disbelief that Holly discovered the truth about it. It offers few details when Holly inquires about its history and nature. Claude enters and shoots the entity, causing the cave to collapse; the entity is impaled by falling debris. Before the three exit the cave, Ralph encounters a vision of his dead son. He determines the entity has not died, so he returns to it. He berates it, then sees it attempt to transform further. Ralph crushes its head with a large rock. Yunis contacts Hayes and implicates Jack and the entity. Claude and the investigators, with help from Jeannie and Glory, coordinate their stories. Hayes holds a press conference to exonerate Terry and reopen Frankie's case. In a mid-credits scene, Holly is shown to have the same cut on her arm that the entity gave to its other victims.

== Related series ==
The character of Holly Gibney was first introduced by King in the Bill Hodges trilogy of novels. That trilogy has been adapted into the TV series Mr. Mercedes, which premiered on Audience in 2017 with Justine Lupe as Gibney. Showrunner Richard Price reworked the character to some extent, without keeping the continuity with the Mr. Mercedes TV series or Bill Hodges novels (Price did not watch the series or read the novels) and asked Stephen King to rename the character, but King insisted on keeping the name Holly Gibney.

== Reception ==
On Rotten Tomatoes, the series has a 91% rating with an average score of 7.7 out of 10 based on 77 reviews. The site's critical consensus is, "Though The Outsider's slow burn isn't always satisfying, it remains watchable thanks to its excellent performances – especially series stand out Cynthia Erivo." On Metacritic, it has a score of 68 out of 100 based on 29 reviews, indicating "generally favorable reviews".

The first two episodes of the series were critically acclaimed, with particular praise for its atmosphere, Bateman's direction, and the performances of the cast. Reception was less positive for the remainder of the series, with continued praise for the cast (particularly Erivo and Mendelsohn) but criticism directed towards the series' pace, length, and handling of the supernatural elements of the source material. Taylor Antrim of Vogue called the first two hours "thrilling [and] totally frightening", praising Mendelsohn's "magnificent" performance and the "unrelentingly dark, irresistibly tense" atmosphere. Remarking on the later episodes, Antrim stated, "Surely enough, this series, which begins at a roiling boil, slows to a tight simmer. There is talk of doppelgängers, a demonic man in a hoodie, malevolent spirits that feed on grief. As The Outsider lazes into such horror tropes, the series loses some of its early charge." Sophie Gilbert of The Atlantic felt that the series worked better as an "elegantly bleak procedural," citing writer Price's inexperience with the horror genre as the reason why "the minute the series has to contend with inexplicable phenomena, it unravels." Still, Gilbert called the first two episodes "superb," praising Bateman's "strikingly effective" performance and direction and also singling out Mendelsohn and Nicholson for praise.

Mike Hale of the New York Times credited writer Price with keeping the series's mystery "legible and credible" and named Erivo's performance as Holly Gibney the best part of the series. That said, Hale found that the series often struggled to adapt its source material, and also criticized the slow pace. Jen Chaney of Vulture noted that the series struggled to balance its tone between "a relatively standard, well-executed crime drama" and "more supernatural, King-style territory." Chaney praised the "welcome understatement" of Erivo's performance and called Mendelsohn "superb" but criticized the series for introducing too many additional subplots and losing its narrative focus. Chaney summarized, "It feels like Price had a firm grip on this story at first but, as he added to it, it started to slip through his fingers like wet clay whipping around on a pottery wheel without firm hands to shape it."

=== Ratings ===
Viewership and ratings per episode of The Outsider
No.	Title	Air date	Rating (18–49)	Viewers (millions)	DVR (18–49)	DVR viewers (millions)	Total (18–49)	Total viewers (millions)
1	"Fish in a Barrel"	January 12, 2020	0.18	0.724	0.08	0.343	0.26	1.067
2	"Roanoke"	January 12, 2020	0.15	0.603	0.08	0.293	0.23	0.896
3	"Dark Uncle"	January 19, 2020	0.19	0.858	0.16	0.630	0.36	1.488
4	"Que Viene el Coco"	January 26, 2020	0.27	0.988	0.18	0.662	0.45	1.650
5	"Tear-Drinker"	February 2, 2020	0.16	0.567	0.18	0.664	0.34	1.231
6	"The One About the Yiddish Vampire"	February 9, 2020	0.22	0.792	0.20	0.708	0.42	1.500
7	"In the Pines, In the Pines"	February 16, 2020	0.29	1.077	0.20	0.620	0.49	1.697
8	"Foxhead"	February 23, 2020	0.27	0.978	0.21	0.715	0.48	1.693
9	"Tigers and Bears"	March 1, 2020	0.33	1.185	0.20	0.684	0.53	1.869
10	"Must/Can't"	March 8, 2020	0.39	1.371	—N/a	—N/a	—N/a	—N/a

=== Accolades ===
Year	Award	Category	Nominee(s)	Result	Ref.
2020	Primetime Emmy Awards	Outstanding Guest Actor in a Drama Series	Jason Bateman (for "Fish in a Barrel")	Nominated	
2021	Critics' Choice Super Awards	Best Horror Series	The Outsider	Nominated	
2021	Critics' Choice Super Awards	Best Actor in a Horror Series	Ben Mendelsohn	Nominated	
2021	Critics' Choice Super Awards	Best Actress in a Horror Series	Cynthia Erivo	Nominated	
2021	Critics' Choice Television Awards	Best Supporting Actress in a Drama Series	Cynthia Erivo	Nominated	
2021	Satellite Awards	Best Television Series – Genre	The Outsider	Nominated	

== Home media ==
The 10-episode limited series was released on Blu-ray and DVD in the United States on July 28, 2020, and features over 40 minutes of behind-the-scenes content.
