= Mongolia Trophy =

Race in Mongolia

The Rostaing Mongolia Trophy is a race scheduled to be held in Central Mongolia at the end of August 2012.

== History ==
The trophy was created in 2011 for the first edition in 2012. In 2012, the trophy will happen from August 26 to 31. There will be six days of expedition. The event is also supported by the Mongolian Ministry of Tourism. The trophy was made by people caring about the impact this trophy might have on the biodiversity. All competitors must abide by the rules of the trophy and can have a penalty if they do not respect the ones about the environment.
