= Henry Rothstein =

British academic

- Education: University of Bristol; University of Sussex
- Scientific career
- Fields: Risk, Geography
- Workplaces: King's College London; London School of Economics

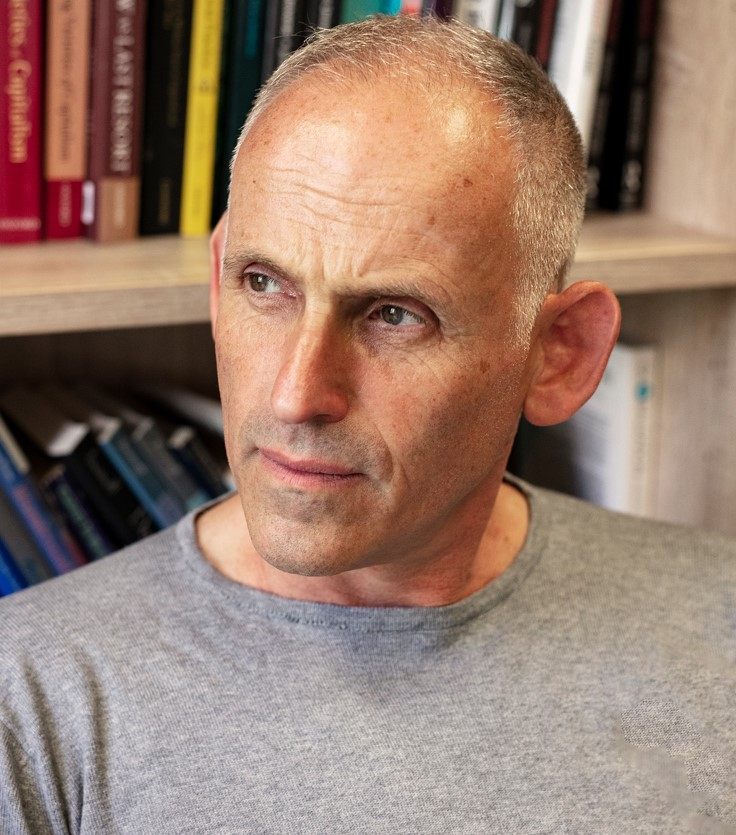
Henry Rothstein. Photograph by Ander McIntyre.

Henry Rothstein is a Professor of Risk and Regulation in the Geography Department at King's College London. He is also the deputy director of the King's Centre for Risk Management, a Research Associate at the London School of Economics' Centre for Analysis of Risk and Regulation and is an established editorial board member of the Journal of Risk Research and Health, Risk & Society.

His notable works include The Government of Risk (with Christopher Hood and Robert Baldwin, 2004), A Theory of Risk Colonization (2006), The Risks of Risk-Based Regulation (2006), and Risk and the Limits of Governance (2013). Rothstein has written over 40 scholarly articles to date.

He has a D.Phil. in Science and Technology Policy Studies, an MSc in Science, Technology and Industrialisation from the University of Sussex and a BSc in Physics from the University of Bristol.
