= Rotstein (surname) =

Rotstein is a surname. Notable people with the surname include:

- Abraham Rotstein (1929–2015), Canadian economist
- Nancy-Gay Rotstein, Canadian poet and novelist
- Robert Rotstein (born 1951), American attorney and novelist

== See also ==
- Rothstein
