= That Tender Age =

1964 film

- Directed by: Gilles Grangier
- Written by: Pascal Jardin; Claude Sautet; Gilles Grangier
- Produced by: Fernandel; Jean Gabin
- Starring: Jean Gabin; Fernandel; Marie Dubois
- Cinematography: Robert Lefebvre
- Edited by: Jacqueline Sadoul
- Music by: Georges Delerue
- Production company: Société Gafer
- Distributed by: Valoria Films
- Release date: 23 December 1964
- Running time: 95 minutes
- Country: France
- Language: French

That Tender Age (French: L'Âge ingrat), is a 1964 French comedy film directed by Gilles Grangier that unites two major stars in Jean Gabin and Fernandel. It recounts how two families are drawn together by an engagement between two of their children, are then torn apart when the young couple fall out, and are finally reconciled.

It was shot at the Saint-Maurice Studios in Paris and on location around the city and at Toulon. The film's sets were designed by the art director Jacques Colombier.

== Plot ==
Before parting for the summer vacation, the students Antoine Lartigue and Marie Malhouin decide to get engaged. Marie's father Émile is guarded, but Antoine's father Adolphe is ecstatic and insists that all the Malhouin family must come and stay with his family in his villa at St Tropez. When they arrive, Émile as a phlegmatic Norman finds the endless bonhomie and bragging of the Provençal Adolphe increasingly annoying. His son Antoine also has a fiery Mediterranean temperament, which erupts in a disco when Marie dances with an old flame and Antoine thumps him. Appalled, Marie breaks off the engagement.

Insulted at his son being rejected, Adolphe says more to Émile than he should, upon which Émile packs family and baggage into the car and drives straight back to Paris. One evening Marie does not come home and to try and find her Émile rings everybody he can think of. The phone being constantly busy, Adolphe is unable to contact him. He has come to Paris to try and find Antoine, who has disappeared. When in apprehension he knocks on Émile's door, he gets a frosty reception but at that point Marie rings home to say she is all right and with Antoine.

== Cast ==
- Jean Gabin as Émile Malhouin
- Fernandel as Adolphe Lartigue
- Marie Dubois as Marie Malhouin
- Franck Fernandel as Antoine Lartigue
- Paulette Dubost as Françoise Malhouin
- Claude Mann as Charles-Édouard
- Madeleine Sylvain as Éliane Lartigue
- Christine Simon as Florence Malhouin
- Henri Rellys as Monsieur Corbidas
- Franck Cabot-David as Henri Lartigue
- Andrée Brabant as Femme sur pédalo
- Nicole Courget as Sophie Malhouin
- Joël Monteilhet as Jules Lartigue
- Yvonne Gamy as Félicie - la bonne
- Georges Rostan as Max Lartigue
- Noël Roquevert as L'estivant récalcitrant

== Bibliography ==
- Harriss, Joseph. Jean Gabin: The Actor Who Was France. McFarland, 2018.
- Oscherwitz, Dayna & Higgins, MaryEllen . The A to Z of French Cinema. Scarecrow Press, 2009.
