= André Rostand =

Malagasy politician

André Rostand is a Malagasy politician. He was a member of the National Assembly of Madagascar, he was elected as a member of the Tiako I Madagasikara party in the 2007 Malagasy parliamentary elections. He represents the constituency of Mahabo.

He was also a candidat in 2013 Malagasy general elections and for IRD in 2019 but both times he failed to be elected with 13.35% and 24,43% of votes.
