= Holly Gibney =

- Cynthia Erivo as Holly Gibney in The Outsider (2020) and Justine Lupe as Holly Gibney in Mr. Mercedes (2017)
- First appearance: Mr. Mercedes (2014)
- Last appearance: Never Flinch (2025)
- Created by: Stephen King
- Portrayed by: Justine Lupe (2017–19); Cynthia Erivo (2020)

In-universe information
- Gender: Female
- Occupation: Private investigator
- Relatives: Charlotte Gibney (mother); Janelle "Janey" Patterson (cousin); Olivia Trelawney (cousin)

Holly Rachel Gibney is a fictional character created by American author Stephen King. Originally appearing in the Bill Hodges trilogy of novels (Mr. Mercedes, Finders Keepers and End of Watch), she later appears as a major supporting character in The Outsider and as the main character in If It Bleeds, a novella included in the collection of the same name, as well as the novels Holly and Never Flinch.

== Character biography ==
King has characterized Gibney as "an obsessive compulsive with a huge inferiority complex". She has been described as "very observant, refreshingly unfiltered and unaware of her innocence" with "savant-like memory, razor sharp observation skills", as well as "a computer whiz". She first appeared in Mr. Mercedes, where she is first shown as a shy (but brave and ethical) recluse with many emotional issues and social awkwardness. By the end of Mr. Mercedes, her intelligence and courage play a major role in assisting main protagonist, Bill Hodges, to bring down the villain. In Finders Keepers, she has evolved into a private detective in partnership with Hodges. In Holly, Gibney returns as a solo private detective.

It has been suggested by media outlets, but not confirmed by King, that Gibney is on the autism spectrum; the portrayal of Gibney in HBO's adaptation of The Outsider was described as being on the spectrum.

== Television adaptations ==
Holly has been portrayed onscreen by Justine Lupe in Mr. Mercedes (which dramatized the three Bill Hodges novels), and by Cynthia Erivo in the miniseries adaptation of The Outsider.

Richard Price, the developer and showrunner of The Outsider, reworked the character to some extent, without keeping the continuity with the Mr. Mercedes TV series or Bill Hodges novels (Price did not watch the series or read the novels), and asked King to rename the character, but he insisted on keeping the name Holly Gibney.

A third series is in development, which will adapt the novel Holly.

== Reception ==
King has gone on record as loving the character, saying in a 2020 NPR interview: "I just love Holly, and I wish she were a real person. [...] She just walked on in the first book she was in, Mr. Mercedes, and she more or less stole the book, and she stole my heart." King himself has described the Gibney character as an idealized fictional woman. In his book If It Bleeds, he went on to praise the character even further.
