= Health, Risk & Society =

- Discipline: Health, risk analysis, risk management
- Language: English
- Edited by: Patrick Brown

Publication details
- History: 1999-present
- Publisher: Taylor & Francis
- Frequency: 8/year
- Impact factor: 1.397 (2014)

Standard abbreviations
- ISO 4: Health Risk Soc.

Indexing
- ISSN: 1369-8575 (print); 1469-8331 (web)

Links
- Journal homepage; Online access; Online archive

Health, Risk & Society is a peer-reviewed academic journal covering all aspects of risk analysis concerning health issues. It was established in 1999 and is published by Taylor & Francis. The editor-in-chief is Patrick Brown from the University of Amsterdam, Netherlands.

== Abstracting and indexing ==
The journal is abstracted and indexed in:

- CINAHL
- Cambridge Scientific Abstracts
- Current Contents/Social & Behavioral Sciences
- EBSCO databases
- International Bibliography of the Social Sciences
- PsycINFO
- Psychological Abstracts
- Scopus
- Social Sciences Citation Index
- Studies on Women and Gender Abstracts

According to the Journal Citation Reports, the journal has a 2014 impact factor of 1.397.
