= Georges Rostan =

French actor (1938–2020)

- Born: 14 November 1938; Marseille, France
- Died: 26 March 2020 (aged 81); Marseille, France
- Occupation: Actor

Georges Maurice Gerard Rostan (14 November 1938 – 26 March 2020) was a French actor.

== Filmography ==
- La Cuisine au Beurre (1963)
- That Tender Age (1964)
- Les Racines du mal (1967)
- Les Enquêtes du commissaire Maigret (1979)
- Retour à Marseille (1980)
- The Judge (1984)
- Le Matelot 512 (1984)
- Les Cinq Dernières Minutes (1989)
- Les Collègues (1999)

== Theatre ==
- Fanny (1968)
