= Justine Lupe =

American actress (born 1989)

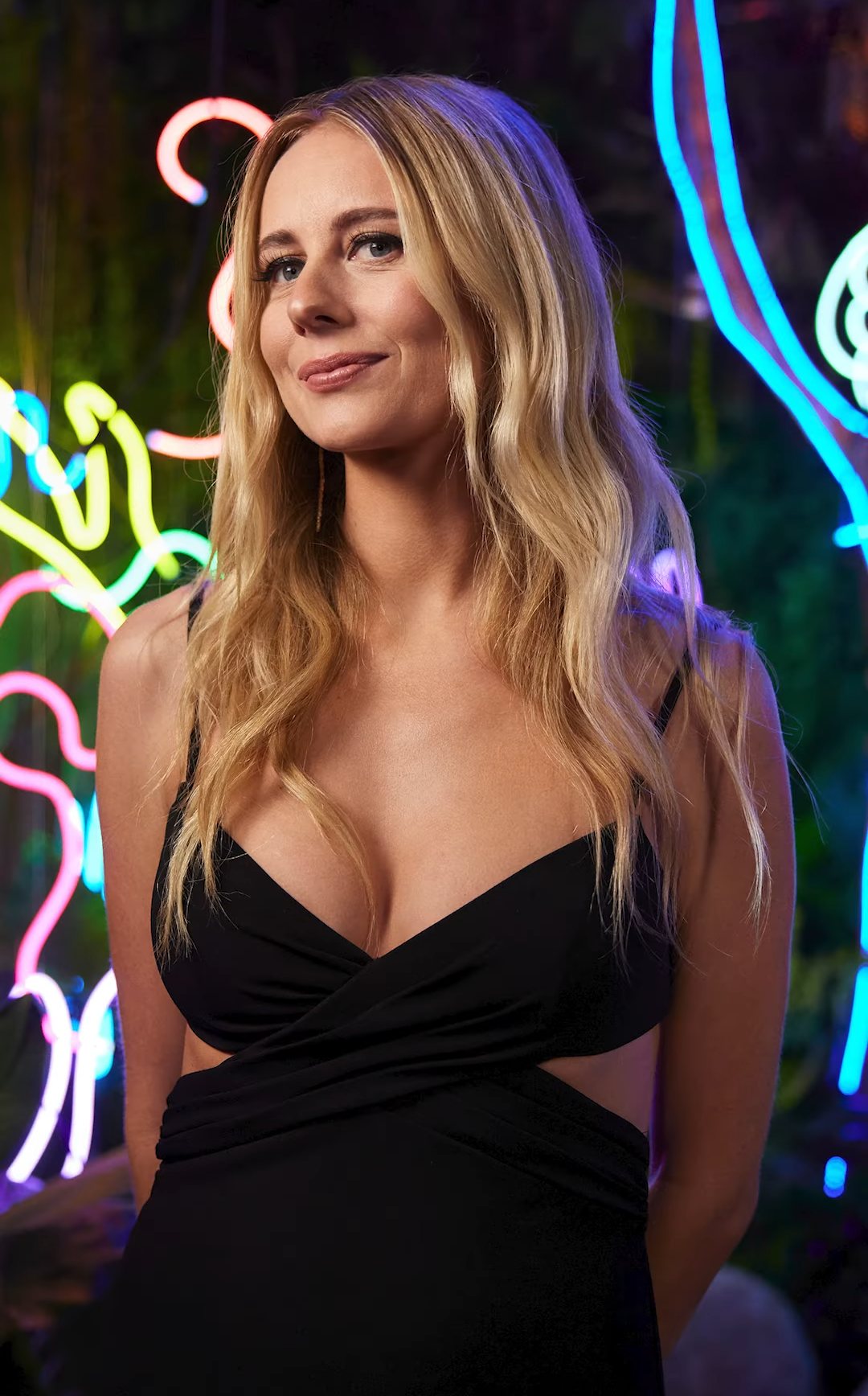
- Lupe in 2024
- Born: May 31, 1989 (age 37); New York City, U.S.
- Education: Juilliard School (BFA)
- Occupation: Actress
- Years active: 2010–present
- Spouse: Tyson Mason (m. 2025)
- Children: 1

Justine Lupe-Schomp (born May 31, 1989) is an American actress. She gained prominence for her role as Willa Ferreyra in the HBO drama series Succession (2018–2023). She is also known for her recurring roles in the sitcom Cristela (2014–2015), the crime drama Mr. Mercedes (2017–2019), the period comedy series The Marvelous Mrs. Maisel (2017–2023), and as Morgan Williams in the romantic comedy series Nobody Wants This (2024–2026). She has also acted in the films Not Fade Away (2012), Frances Ha (2013), A Midsummer Night's Dream (2017), and Luckiest Girl Alive (2022)

== Early life ==
Born in New York City and raised in Colorado, Lupe is a 2007 graduate of the Denver School of the Arts theater program and a 2011 graduate of the Juilliard School in New York City. Her grandmother, Kay Schomp, has a theater named after her at the Denver School of the Arts.

== Career ==
Lupe's early film roles include the David Chase drama film Not Fade Away (2012), and the Noah Baumbach comedy film Frances Ha (2013). She played Flute in the 2017 film adaptation A Midsummer Night's Dream directed by Casey Wilder Mott. Her early television appearances include in Southland, Harry's Law, and Royal Pains (all in 2012). She then acted in Shameless in 2013 and Deadbeat in 2014. Lupe starred on the ABC sitcom Cristela. Lupe's run on Cristela began with the second episode, as she replaced another actress who played Maddie in the pilot. The series ran from 2014 to 2015. She then appeared on shows such as The Good Wife in 2015, Younger in 2016, and Madam Secretary from 2016 to 2018. She also starred alongside Jimmi Simpson in off-Broadway play Empathitrax written by Ana Nogueira. Elisabeth Vincentelli of The New York Times praised Lupe's performance describing it as "appropriately fidgety [and] raw-nerved".

She then took a leading role as Holly Gibney in the Audience series Mr. Mercedes (2017–2019). She also acted in the comedy series BrainDead (2016), and Bull (2017), and voiced roles in Robot Chicken (2022). She was cast in a recurring role as Astrid Weissman in The Marvelous Mrs. Maisel from 2017 to 2023. After recurring on Succession in its first two seasons, Lupe was made a series regular for its third season. During this time she appeared in Snowfall (2017), the sitcom Alone Together (2018), and Sneaky Pete (2018). She then had a leading role as Nell Rutherford opposite Mila Kunis in the film Luckiest Girl Alive (2022). In 2024, Lupe played Morgan in the series Nobody Wants This.

== Personal life ==
She married visual artist Tyson Mason in February 2025. They are parents to daughter Ellis, born in August 2024.

== Filmography ==
=== Film ===
Key
†	Denotes films that have not yet been released

Justine Lupe film performances
Year	Title	Role	Notes
2011	Three Forms of Insomnia	Monica	Kickstarter
2011	Ex-Girlfriends	Lisa	
2012	Not Fade Away	Candace	
2012	Frances Ha	Nessa	
2017	A Midsummer Night's Dream	Flute	
2022	Luckiest Girl Alive	Nell Rutherford	
2026	Seekers of Infinite Love		
TBA	Sponsor †		Filming
TBA	They Follow †	TBA	Post-production

=== Television ===
Justine Lupe television performances
Year	Title	Role	Notes
2011	Unforgettable	Ashley	Episode: "Friended"
2012	Southland	Kathy	Episode: "Integrity Check"
2012	Harry's Law	Phoebe Blake	8 episodes
2012	Royal Pains	Cameron Krissy	Episode: "Sand Legs"
2013	Shameless	Blake Collins	Episode: "May I Trim Your Hedges?"
2014	Deadbeat	Alice	Episode: "Out-Of-Body Issues"
2014‍–‍2015	Cristela	Maddie Culpepper	Main cast, 21 episodes
2015	The Good Wife	Maggie Rossum	Episode: "Payback"
2016	Younger	Jade Winslow	3 episodes
2016	BrainDead	Margie	Episode: "The Path to War Part Two: The Impact of Propaganda on Congressional War Votes"
2016‍–‍2018	Madam Secretary	Captain Ronnie Baker	6 episodes
2017	Bull	Ginny Bretton	Episode: "E.J."
2017‍–‍2019	Mr. Mercedes	Holly Gibney	Main cast, 25 episodes
2017	Snowfall	Victoria	5 episodes
2017‍–‍2023	The Marvelous Mrs. Maisel	Astrid Weissman	Recurring role; 9 episodes
2018	Alone Together	Charlotte	Episode: "Pilot"
2018	Sneaky Pete	Hannah	3 episodes
2018‍–‍2023	Succession	Willa Ferreyra	Recurring role (seasons 1–2); main cast (seasons 3–4)
2021‍–‍2022	Home Economics	Emily	3 episodes
2021	Robot Chicken	Flight Attendant, Hedgehog Mother	Voice role; episode: "May Cause the Exact Thing You're Taking This to Avoid"
2024	The Big Door Prize	Alice Wickstead	Recurring role
2024‍–‍	Nobody Wants This	Morgan	Main role

=== Theatre ===
Justine Lupe stage performances
Year	Title	Role	Playwright	Venue
2010	Western Country	Oxana	Noah Haidle	Williamstown Theatre Festival
2010	House of Home	Molly Campbell	Bekah Brunstetter	Williamstown Theatre Festival
2015	The New Sincerity	Rose	Alena Smith	Bay Street Theatre, New York
2016	Empathitrax	Her	Ana Nogueira	HERE Arts Center, off-Broadway

== Accolades ==
Organizations	Year	Category	Work	Result	Ref.
Actors Awards	2022	Outstanding Ensemble in a Drama Series	Succession	Won	
Actors Awards	2024	Outstanding Ensemble in a Drama Series	Succession	Won	
Critics Choice Television Awards	2026	Best Supporting Actress in a Comedy Series	Nobody Wants This	Nominated	
Satellite Awards	2019	Best Supporting Actress in a Series, Miniseries or TV Movie	Mr. Mercedes	Nominated	
