= Berenguier de Poizrengier =

12th century French minstrel

Berenguier de Poizrengier or Peizrenger (floruit after 1195) was a minor troubadour or jongleur, the author of one cobla esparsa, "Mal'aventura do Deus a mas mas", about some bad luck in a game of dice, and some corresponding good fortune in love. Metrically it is modelled off of "Bon'aventura do Deus als Pizans" by Peire Vidal, which can be confidentially dated to 1195. It was probably composed in Languedoc, because of a reference to cen solz de Malgoires. The cobla is preserved only in the chansonnier known as H, where the poet is named as berengiers d(e) peiz renger in the rubric.

Berenguier's place of origin, peiz renger, was identified with Puyrenier in Gascony by Camille Chabaneau and with Puisserguier in Languedoc by Oskar Schultz-Gora, which was supported by Alfred Jeanroy, since the name Berenguier is well-recorded in the family of the lords of Puisserguier.
