= Rostaing =

Rostaing Group
- Industry: Leather
- Founded: France, 1789
- Founder: Joseph Rostaing
- Headquarters: Bien Hoa, Dong Nai, Viet Nam, Bien Hoa, Dong Nai, Viet Nam
- Products: Luxury goods: wallet, bag; Protection gloves; Aprons; Backpacks
- Services: investment advisory
- Owner: Jacques Rostaing
- Number of employees: 600
- Website: http://rostaingvietnam.com

Rostaing is a French company specializing in the production of protective gloves, leather goods, backpacks, and textiles. Established in 1789 as a tannery by Joseph Rostaing in Villieu, Ain, the company has evolved over more than two centuries from traditional leather tanning to become a diversified manufacturer with a global presence. Rostaing introduced its first protective gloves in the mid-20th century and expanded into gardening gloves and technical textiles. With operations in France, Vietnam, and Mongolia, the company maintains vertical integration across its supply chain and distributes products in over 35 countries.

== History ==
Joseph Rostaing was living in Villieu, a small village in the French department of Ain, just 50 kilometers away from Lyon. Joseph Rostaing created in 1789 an artisanal tannery in the Toison's riverside. There, he used to produce vegetable leather to create shoes for postmen and soldiers. He died in 1830 and gave his tannery to his son, François Rostaing.

François Rostaing succeeded into managing the business even though there was a major crisis following the revolution and the republican insurrection in Paris in 1848.

Joannès Rostaing, his son, kept the old tradition by creating leather with tallow. This soft and fat leather was sold to horse's and ox’s tools specialists (harnesses, belts…).

In 1920, Leon Rostaing, the great-grand-son, developed vegetal tanning with oak’s bark especially for shoes. The luxury bootmakers and shoemakers in Lyon, Paris and Cannes were then using soles buffered "TANNERY ROSTAING founded in 1789."

This successful activity lasted until 1950. It was then difficult to keep the business going because the tools used were getting too old.

Jean Rostaing, who was studying at the Tannery school in Lyon, joined the family company and developed in 1959 a new business: manufacturing protection gloves. He introduced the first protection gloves in leather for coppersmiths and iron makers during the 1960s. WRostaing developed water and oil repellent leathers and treated them against heat. Jean Rostaing was a partner of the first security group to protect workers all over their body. This group was at first shared with Essilor, VTN and Paraboot and lasted 50 years.

Thanks to the French industrialization, the demand for gloves did not stop increasing and the company had a huge success. Rostaing also supplied the first personalized protection gloves for EDF.

In 1976, the company launched its range of gloves used for gardening. In the same time period, the company has also outsourced some of its factories (Tunisia, Morocco and Vietnam).

The branch in charge of producing gloves is now managed Jean Rostaing’s three children: Catherine, Jacques and Stéphane.

In 2007, the company decided to go back to its roots by launching a new tannery based in Vietnam.

== Rostaing Vietnam ==
Rostaing Vietnam (also called Rostaing VN) is a branch of Rostaing SA created in 1995.

1995: Branch launch

Rostaing VN was created in 1995 by Jacques Rostaing in the aim of reorganizing the industry. The factory is 1500 m2 large and is located near Ho Chi Minh City.

According to Mr. Rostaing, “Launching a business in Asia is not like launching one in Africa or Eastern Europe, where you only have to find a Managing Director who wants to go there. In Asia, it is a choice, it is crucial for your company. You need to have a strong management as well as a local way of thinking. What really matters is to stay in control of your production. You cannot focus only on outsourcing in Asia.”

In Vietnam, the textile factory is a processing industry. Raw materials - thread, fabric, wool, leather = are bought in France and imported in Vietnam to process them. Thus, old techniques are now used again in Vietnam, such as hand-sewn.

In 2001, Rostaing SA is becoming the leader of the gardening gloves market in France. In 2002, Jacques Rostaing received a prize for the implementation and development of his company abroad.

2003: development

In 2003, the Vietnam branch has 350 employees and 3 different factories. The profit is about 1 million dollars.

In France, Stéphane Rostaing is in charge of managing the company, the production and the commercialisation. The Marketing and Sales department is led by Catherine Rostaing.

In Vietnam, a latex department is created, Rostaing Technic, as well as a special department for leather goods.

2006: Vertical integration

In 2006, the company is coming back to its roots by developing the historical industry: tannery. When Jacques Rostaing opens his tannery, there were only 19 others in Vietnam.

This tannery employs 90 people and gives the opportunity to Rostaing VN to take control over the major part of the production, that is to say, from creating leather from raw materials to creating gloves.

While the leather glove has been so far the specialty of Rostaing, it appeared ranges of rubber gloves. A fourth plant was born, for a total of 450 workers.

Creating a business in Vietnam was a challenge but Rostaing group succeeded into using Rostaing VN as a starting point for developing. For instance, new jobs were created in France to take care of controlling the quality and safety of the products.

2009 - 2012: Diversification

In June 2009, the Canova Company is bought by Rostaing. Canova is a company of silk printing. In 2010, Canova Rostaing is created in the aim of using the furniture of Canova while producing fabric and outdoor bags.

In May 2011, Rostaing bought Apex's assets which is specialised in backpacks. Apex’s activity is added to Canova Rostaing, and the company now focuses on backpacks.

Each year, about 6 million Rostaing gloves are sold in 35 countries.

Rostaing Vietnam is now employing 600 people and the company controls 90% of its production line.

== Rostaing Mongolia ==
In 2010 was created Rostaing Mongolia by Jacques Rostaing.

Rostaing Expertise was also created as a consultancy company for investors in Mongolia.

In 2011, the first shop JR was opened in Arizona Plaza 65, in Ulan Bator. JR is a brand of luxury leather accessories (gloves, bags…).

The same year has seen the takeover of the model agency Asian Models now called Asian Models Agency which is specialized in Mongolian models.

The Rostaing Mongolia Trophy will take place from August 26 to 31.

The Rostaing Mongolia Trophy, supported by the Ministry of Environment and Tourism in Mongolia, is a race for outdoor travelers and will be located in Gorkhi-Terelj National Park, in Central Mongolia not far from Ulan Bator.

The competitors, in teams of three, will move forward through horseback riding, biking and running. They will cover all types of terrain – from screaming downhill runs, across the high country, through grassy steppe and pasture to snow-capped mountains. The competition will start at the statue of Genghis Khan, and will finish in the Sükhbaatar place, named after Damdin Sükhbaatar, the Mongolian Revolution's hero.
