= Rostaing Berenguier =

Rostanh or Rostaing Berenguier de Marselha was an early fourteenth-century troubadour and Hospitaller from Marseille. He was a friend of the Grand Master Folco del Vilaret. The earliest biographical notice we have about Rostanh is the brief but unreliable biography in Jean de Nostredame. He is one of only three known troubadours to compose estampidas, the others being Raimbaut de Vaqueiras (who composed the first one, Kalenda maia) and Cerverí de Girona (who composed four). Rostanh composed only one: La dousa paria. His songs are preserved in the manuscript called "Giraud", where the first one is a long canso in honour of his patron Folco.
