= End of Watch (novel) =

2016 novel by Stephen King

- First edition cover.
- Author: Stephen King
- Language: English
- Series: Bill Hodges Trilogy
- Genre: Crime fiction
- Published: June 7, 2016 (Scribner)
- Publication place: U.S.
- Media type: Print (Hardcover)
- Pages: 432
- ISBN: 978-1-5011-2974-2
- Preceded by: Finders Keepers
- Followed by: The Outsider

End of Watch is a crime novel by American writer Stephen King, the third volume of a trilogy focusing on Detective Bill Hodges, following Mr. Mercedes and Finders Keepers. The book was first announced at an event at St. Francis College on April 21, 2015, under the title The Suicide Prince. On June 10, the new title End of Watch was announced. At the 2015 Edgar Awards, while accepting the award for Best Novel for Mr. Mercedes, King announced that the novel's antagonist, Brady Hartsfield, would be making a return in this book. The novel was released on June 7, 2016.

== Plot ==
Retired detective Bill Hodges, along with his sidekick Holly Gibney, runs the private investigation agency Finders Keepers. Hodges is diagnosed with pancreatic cancer. Given only months to live, he finds himself drawn into a recent spree of suicides. All the dead are connected by a common thread: each of them has, in the past, been in contact with mass murderer Brady Hartsfield, the notorious Mr. Mercedes who, six years ago, plotted to blow up a rock concert venue packed with teenagers. Hodges and Holly thwarted Brady's plans and left the killer in a vegetative state from which he never regained consciousness. However, many of the staff in the hospital where Brady now resides believe that he is recovering at an impossible rate, and that he may be faking his injuries to avoid facing charges for his crimes. Meanwhile, all those who have gotten too close to proving this suspicion seem to have died by suicide.

After his head injury, Brady found himself gaining new abilities, including the power to move small objects with his mind and the ability to enter the bodies of certain people susceptible to his mental domination. Still confined to his hospital bed, Brady has used his power to finish his murderous work by creating a hypnotic video game app that heightens the user's susceptibility. Once the users are in Brady's control, he uses the app to dominate their minds and persuade them to kill themselves. The targets are the very teenagers who escaped death when Brady's plan to destroy the concert venue failed. Brady's ultimate goal, however, is to lure Hodges into the game and exact revenge. Brady uses the bodies of both a corrupt neurosurgeon and a hospital librarian as puppets and red herrings to do his dirty work and to misdirect the police while he makes his final move to destroy Hodges, all the while unaware that Hodges is already racing the clock against his own death.

== Television adaptation ==
On October 10, 2017, Audience announced that the TV series based on the first Bill Hodges novel, Mr. Mercedes, was renewed for season 2, based on the original Mr. Mercedes novel, Finders Keepers and End of Watch. The season premiered on August 22, 2018.
