= The Outsider (King novel) =

2018 horror novel by Stephen King

- First edition U.S. cover
- Author: Stephen King
- Audio read by: Will Patton
- Cover artist: Will Staehle
- Language: English
- Genre: Crime fiction, horror
- Published: May 22, 2018
- Publisher: Scribner
- Publication place: United States
- Media type: Print (Hardcover and Paperback)
- Pages: 576
- ISBN: 978-1501180989
- Preceded by: End of Watch
- Followed by: If It Bleeds (novella)

The Outsider (2018) is a horror novel by the American author Stephen King. The novel was published by Scribner.

== Plot ==
In the fictional town of Flint City, Oklahoma, the mutilated and raped corpse of Frankie Peterson is found. Fingerprints and DNA at the crime scene as well as witness accounts all clearly indicate local sports coach Terrence Maitland as the killer, so detective Ralph Anderson orders a public arrest.

Maitland claims innocence, having been at a conference with several other teachers in Cap City at the time, which the other teachers all confirm. Footage of Maitland at the conference as well as fingerprints are found, casting confusion on the case.

On the day of Maitland's arraignment, a large crowd has gathered around the courthouse. Amid the commotion, Ollie Peterson, the brother of Frankie Peterson, starts shooting at Maitland, blaming him for his brother's murder and mother's subsequent fatal heart attack. Maitland is mortally wounded before Ollie is killed by the police. In his dying words, Maitland still claims innocence. Ralph Anderson is placed on administrative leave but continues to investigate the case.

Detective Jack Hoskins, who holds a grudge against Anderson, is sent to investigate an abandoned ranch outside of town, where clothes that the murderer wore are found. Jack is embraced by a shrouded figure from behind, causing what feels like sunburn on the back of his neck. The figure reappears later in Hoskins's home, informing him that the malady is cancer and that it can take the disease away if Hoskins does what it asks of him.

Alec Pelley, an investigator hired by Maitland's attorney Howard (Howie) Gold, hires private investigator Holly Gibney. During her investigation, Holly learns of a case in which two girls were killed in a similar fashion to Frankie Peterson. All the evidence in that case pointed directly to Heath Holmes, an orderly who cared for Terry Maitland's father in a nursing home in Ohio. Holmes claimed that he was out of town when the two girls were killed, and upon being arrested, died by suicide. Before his arrest, around the time the two girls were murdered, Holmes and Maitland made seemingly accidental physical contact resulting in a cut on Maitland's hand.

Holly, Pelley, Howie, Ralph Anderson and his wife Jeannie, Terry Maitland's wife Marcy, police lieutenant Yune Sablo, and district attorney Bill Samuels all meet at Howie Gold's office. Holly shows them a few minutes of a Mexican luchadora film which depicts a mysterious presence kidnapping and murdering a child, leaving evidence that points directly to one man, who expresses his innocence but is found guilty and subsequently hanged. At the hanging, the man sees the presence, called "El Cuco".

Holly states how she believes El Cuco, which she refers to as an "outsider", is responsible for the murders—it is able to mimic a person's appearance by absorbing their blood. Since Maitland was cut by the Outsider imitating Holmes before the murder, they realize that Claude Bolton, a witness who testified being cut by Maitland's fingernail the day of the murder, is the Outsider's next victim.

The group deduce the Outsider is hiding in a cave and when they arrive, they are immediately fired upon by Hoskins, who is in a sniper position overlooking them after being sent there by the Outsider. Howie and Pelley are both killed and Sablo is wounded. Following a brief standoff, Ralph kills Hoskins. Ralph and Holly make their way further into the cave where they are then greeted by the Outsider, who resembles a mixture of Bolton and Maitland.

Ralph prepares to shoot the Outsider, but is told that a gunshot could cause another cave-in, killing all of them. Instead, Holly insults the Outsider and hits it repeatedly over the head with a sock full of ball bearings when it lunges at her. The Outsider begins to disintegrate and worm-like creatures begin crawling from its body. With the Outsider appearing destroyed, Ralph and Holly exit the cave. Holly and Sablo go to the Bolton residence to get their stories straight with them, while Ralph waits with the bodies of Howie and Pelley.

Later, Samuels announces Maitland's exoneration, alleging defective DNA samples as well as planted fingerprints, and confirming the video proof supporting Maitland's alibi. Ralph says goodbye to Holly, thanking her for telling him to keep an open mind.

== Characters ==
- Ralph Anderson - A detective from Flint City PD. He investigates the gruesome murder of an eleven year old boy. Like most characters, at first he believes Terry Maitland is the murderer but later starts to have doubts.
- Holly Gibney - A private investigator from Finder's Keepers, who assists Anderson, Gold, Pelley and Sablo in finding the real murderer.
- Howie Gold - Terry Maitland’s lawyer. He firmly believes Terry is innocent and assists Anderson, Gibney, Pelley and Sablo in discovering the real murderer.
- Alec Pelley - A former police officer who now works in law. Alec Pelley assists Anderson, Gibney, Pelley and Sablo in finding the real murderer.
- Terry Maitland - A Flint City Boys Little League coach. He becomes the prime suspect of the murder of an eleven-year-old boy, but maintains his innocence.
- Jeannie Anderson - Ralph’s wife. She is extremely disturbed by the murder and assists Ralph while he battles the case emotionally.
- Marcy Maitland - Terry Maitland’s wife. She stands by her man during the whole ordeal and is harassed by the media as well as her daughters.
- Bill Samuels - Flint City ADA in charge of the murder case trial. He refuses to believe that a supernatural creature killed the boy and firmly believes Terry is guilty.
- Yune Sablo - A detective from Flint City PD. He assists Anderson, Gibney, Pelley and Gold in the murder case.
- Jack Hoskins - A lazy, corrupt detective from Flint City PD who hates Ralph Anderson.
- Claude Bolton - A former addict who has previously served three prison sentences, and has since reformed. He is almost set up as the murderer in The Outsider’s next murder.

== Background information ==
The novel was first mentioned in an interview for USA Today on August 7, 2017. The book cover was first revealed on January 18, 2018. An excerpt was published in the May 25, 2018, issue of Entertainment Weekly.

== Television adaptation ==
In June 2018, it was announced that MRC and Aggregate Films had optioned the novel to be produced as a 10-part miniseries with Richard Price scripting, and executive producers Jack Bender, Jason Bateman, Michael Costigan, and Marty Bowen. On December 3, 2018, it was ordered to series by HBO, starring Ben Mendelsohn as Ralph Anderson, along with Jason Bateman, Paddy Considine, Cynthia Erivo, Bill Camp, and Mare Winningham. Julianne Nicholson, Yul Vázquez, Jeremy Bobb, and Marc Menchaca are to appear as regulars, with Hettienne Park and Michael Esper set to recur.
