= Finders Keepers (King novel) =

Novel by Stephen King

- First edition cover
- Author: Stephen King
- Language: English
- Series: Bill Hodges Trilogy
- Genre: Crime fiction
- Published: June 2, 2015
- Publisher: Scribner (US); Hodder & Stoughton (UK)
- Publication place: United States
- Media type: Print (Hardcover and Paperback)
- Pages: 434
- ISBN: 978-1-5011-0007-9
- Preceded by: Mr. Mercedes
- Followed by: End of Watch

Finders Keepers is a crime novel by American writer Stephen King, published on June 2, 2015. It is the second volume in a trilogy focusing on Detective Bill Hodges, following Mr. Mercedes (2014). The book is about the murder of reclusive writer John Rothstein (an amalgam of John Updike, Philip Roth, and J. D. Salinger), his missing notebooks, and the release of his killer from prison after 35 years. The book's cover was revealed on King's official site on January 30, 2015. An excerpt was published in the May 15, 2015 issue of Entertainment Weekly.

== Plot ==
In 1978, petty criminal Morris Bellamy and two accomplices break into the home of John Rothstein, a reclusive author famous for his Jimmy Gold Runner trilogy. The trio force Rothstein to give them the combination to his safe, discovering a small fortune of cash and a large number of notebooks. Rothstein pleads with the burglars to keep the cash but leave the notebooks. When Morris tells the others to take everything, Rothstein begins to insult him and is murdered as a result. After making their getaway, Morris kills his accomplices at a deserted rest area and drives to the home of his estranged mother.

The next morning, Morris visits an old friend, Andrew "Andy" Halliday, to show him the notebooks. When Morris asks how long he should wait until they can sell the notebooks to private collectors, Andy tells him to hide the notebooks until the turn of the twenty-first century. That night, Morris puts the cash and notebooks in a trunk and buries them underneath a tree behind the house. Later, he is jailed for violently attacking and raping a woman while drunk. Morris pleads guilty in the hopes of getting a reduced sentence but is given a life sentence instead. It is not until 2014 when Morris is granted parole.

In 2010, Pete Saubers, a young boy who is now living in Morris' childhood home, has parents who are financially struggling. While they are arguing, Pete goes behind the house and comes across the half-buried trunk, eventually discovering the cash and notebooks. Over the next few years, he anonymously sends envelopes containing $500 to his parents every month, improving the family's fortunes. He also starts reading the notebooks and becomes a fan of the Jimmy Gold character. Pete researches Rothstein and learns about his unsolved murder but assumes the culprit has died or been imprisoned since then.

Several years later, after the money finally runs out, Pete looks into how he can sell some of the notebooks. He goes to his favorite teacher, Mr. Ricker, saying he has a first edition of a Rothstein book and wants to sell it. Pete shows him a list of book dealers which includes Andy Halliday, asking him which would be best; Mr. Ricker warns him to stay away from Andy as he has a reputation for selling stolen property.

Pete goes to Andy's shop using a fake name, showing him scanned copies of some of the pages of the notebooks. Andy, who is deeply in debt, immediately recognizes them and tells him to bring the notebooks, realizing they are worth a fortune. Andy uncovers Pete's real name and blackmails him, demanding that he give up the notebooks or be reported to the police. Pete hides the notebooks in the basement of a property his father is currently selling which used to be a recreation center.

Pete's sister Tina, who always suspected it was Pete sending the money, notices how distressed he has been lately. Through the sister of Jerome Robinson, he is put in touch with Bill Hodges and Holly Gibney. Meanwhile, Morris finds the empty trunk and suspects Andy stole the notebooks, as he was the only person who knew about them. He goes to Andy's shop with an axe and threatens to kill him if he doesn't give him their whereabouts. Andy tells Morris about Pete but is killed anyway.

Hodges questions Pete, but he refuses to tell him anything. Hodges and Holly try to follow him, but Pete manages to lose them and goes to Andy's shop to tell him he is not giving up the notebooks. Instead, he finds Morris waiting for him and narrowly escapes. Pete finally calls Hodges for help, and they start driving towards his house.

Morris shoots Pete's mother and kidnaps Tina, taking her to the recreation center (not knowing the notebooks are hidden there) and calling Pete to demand the notebooks. Pete goes to the recreation center to retrieve the notebooks, but when he discovers Morris there with Tina, he threatens to burn the notebooks if Tina isn't released. Hodges and Jerome arrive at the recreation center. When Hodges finds Morris, he throws a pair of shoes to create a distraction and tackles him. Pete is startled and drops the lighter, setting the notebooks alight. Morris goes to the notebooks to try to save them but dies in the blaze. Tina, Pete and Hodges escape out a basement window with the help of Jerome.

The novel ends with Hodges going to see Brady Hartsfield in the hospital. A picture of Brady and his mother mysteriously falls over while he is there. After Hodges leaves, the tap mysteriously switches on and the picture falls over again.

== Reception ==
Finders Keepers received mixed to positive reviews. In her review for The Guardian, Alison Flood praised the book as "expertly plotted" and a "fresh take" on one of King's favorite subjects – "the relationship between a writer and their fans." Janet Maslin of The New York Times wrote that while Finders Keepers "feels very much like a middle volume," it was still a page-turner, and praised the jumps between time periods and the "very appealing trio of crime-solvers who joined forces in 'Mr. Mercedes.'" Nick Romeo of The Boston Globe was more critical, faulting the "somewhat outlandish plot" and how "Deeper themes about the power of fiction feel somewhat grafted onto the suspenseful story."

== Television adaptation ==
The third season of Mr. Mercedes retains the title from the first Bill Hodges book, and follows the events from Finders Keepers. As of April 2020 the TV show has an uncertain future, as the Audience Network closed and it was uncertain whether the show would return for a fourth season.
