= Mr. Mercedes =

2014 novel by Stephen King

- First edition cover
- Author: Stephen King
- Language: English
- Series: Bill Hodges Trilogy
- Genre: Crime, mystery, thriller
- Published: June 3, 2014 (Scribner)
- Publication place: USA
- Media type: Print (hardcover)
- Pages: 436
- ISBN: 978-1-4767-5445-1
- Followed by: Finders Keepers

Mr. Mercedes is a crime novel by American writer Stephen King. He calls it his first hard-boiled detective book. It was published on June 3, 2014. It is the first volume in a trilogy, followed in 2015 by Finders Keepers, the first draft of which was finished around the time Mr. Mercedes was published, and End of Watch in 2016.

The novel won the 2015 Edgar Award for Best Novel from the Mystery Writers of America and Goodreads Choice Awards for 2014 in the Mystery and Thriller category.

== Background information ==
During his Chancellor's Speaker Series talk at University of Massachusetts Lowell on December 7, 2012, King indicated that he was writing a crime novel about a retired policeman being taunted by a murderer. With the working title Mr Mercedes and inspired by a true event about a woman driving her car into a McDonald's restaurant, it was originally meant to be a short story just a few pages long.

Describing the novel for an interview with USA Today, published on September 18, 2013, King said that, while it was started prior to the Boston Marathon bombings, Mr Mercedes involves a terrorist plot that is "too creepily close for comfort". An excerpt was published in the May 16, 2014 issue of Entertainment Weekly.

== Plot ==
The driver of a Mercedes S class plows into the crowd of people at a job fair, killing eight and severely injuring many. The Mercedes has been stolen from a woman named Olivia Trelawney, who later kills herself out of guilt. Bill Hodges, a recently retired detective from the local police department, receives a letter from an individual claiming to be the culprit, referring to himself as "Mr Mercedes". Hodges is divorced, lonely and fed up with his life, occasionally considering suicide. The letter intrigues Hodges, who investigates the case instead of turning the letter over to his former police colleague, Pete Huntley.

Brady Hartsfield, the man behind the job-fair massacre, is an emotionally disturbed psychopath who lost his father at age eight. When he was a young boy he killed his mentally handicapped brother at the prompting of his alcoholic mother, with whom he has an incestuous relationship. Brady works in an electronics store and sells ice cream from a truck as his second job. Riding in the truck enables him to observe Hodges and his neighbors, among them seventeen-year-old Jerome Robinson, who does small chores for Hodges.

Hodges meets Olivia's sister, Janey Patterson, who hires him to investigate her suicide and the theft of the Mercedes. Hodges and Janey soon begin dating. Hodges finds out, with the help of computer-savvy Jerome, how Mr Mercedes stole the car and drove Olivia (whom he made contact with through his job at the electronics shop) to suicide by leaving eerie sound files on her computer that were set to go off at unpredictable intervals, which escalated her feelings of guilt.

At the funeral of Janey and Olivia's recently deceased mother, Hodges meets Janey's unpleasant relatives, among them her emotionally unstable cousin Holly. After the funeral Brady watches as Hodges' car rolls towards the church. He mistakenly thinks Hodges is behind the wheel, when in fact it is Janey. As the car approaches Holly and Hodges, Brady remotely blows up the car, killing Janey. Hodges feels remorse but becomes even more eager to solve the case without the help of the police. Holly joins Hodges and Jerome in the investigation.

Brady accidentally kills his mother with a poisoned hamburger, which he had prepared for Jerome's dog. With her rotting body in their house, he plans to commit suicide by blowing himself up at a concert using explosives hidden inside a wheelchair. Jerome, Hodges and Holly manage to uncover Brady's real identity and search his computer. They eventually deduce Brady's plan and rush to the concert venue to stop him. Hodges begins to suffer a heart attack and is unable to venture into the concert but urges Holly and Jerome to press on. Holly locates Brady and delivers two harsh blows to his head using Hodges's "happy slapper", a sock full of ball bearings that Hodges uses as a blackjack.

Later Hodges (who had been saved by concert staff), Holly and Jerome have a picnic to discuss the recent events. Hodges has learned that he will not be criminally charged for his actions regarding the Mr Mercedes investigation. Holly and Jerome have received medals from the city, congratulating them on their work. Meanwhile Brady awakes from his coma and asks to see his mother.

== Main characters ==
- Kermit William "Bill" Hodges – The main protagonist and a retired detective. Later in the story he falls in love with Janey, Olivia's sister.
- Brady Hartsfield – The main antagonist and Mr Mercedes.
- Jerome Robinson – Hodges' hired help and close friend. He's a bright, computer-savvy adolescent.
- Olivia Trelawney – The rich woman to whom the Mercedes Benz belonged. She dies by suicide, thinking that the voices she hears (which are actually coming from her computer) are the ghosts of the people the Mercedes killed.
- Janelle "Janey" Patterson – Olivia Trelawney's sister. She encourages Hodges to investigate Mr Mercedes and later falls in love with Hodges. She is killed in a car bombing that was actually meant for Hodges.
- Holly Gibney – Janey's cousin and later on Hodges' partner in investigation.
- Peter "Pete" Huntley – Hodges' former partner.
- Deborah Ann Hartsfield – Brady's alcoholic mother. She later eats a poisoned hamburger that was meant for Jerome's dog and dies a gruesome death.
- Elizabeth Wharton – Olivia and Janey's elderly mother.

== Reception ==
Michael Marshall Smith of The Guardian noted the novel "is firmly positioned in suspense-thriller territory and the non-supernatural world – somewhere King evidently feels increasingly at home. … At its heart, Mr Mercedes is a traditional cat-and-mouse story about a psychopathic killer and the renegade cop who makes it his mission to bring him down." Considering three levels of evaluation – quality per se, expectations of King's "readers who return for his distinctively unstoppable storytelling engine, his particular and hugely dependable voice", and rules of "whichever genre" King increasingly departs to, he sums up: "Good book? Hell, yes. Good Stephen King book? Absolutely." Brian Truitt of USA Today gave the novel 3 and 1/2 stars: "With an accidental gumshoe and a freaky serial killer, … Mr. Mercedes takes the old detective genre in an excellent, modern direction". He commended "a fascinating look at what makes a serial killer in a post-9/11 context", adding that King also "really succeeds with Hodges' companions". Sheryll Connelly of The New York Daily News stated the novel is "telling a story that could almost be characterized as sweet except of course for the sociopath on a bloody rampage. King will be King, and he's never less than scary. Who in their right mind would want him to be?" and noted that this is one of his books where instead of it being "horrific, King expresses outright tenderness and it's evident here."

Tasha Robinson of The A.V. Club was more reserved, writing that the novel opens with its best moment and "sags significantly in the middle, but it barrels toward a memorable conclusion … his tense, propulsive, ultra-fast-paced climax here seems like it was written with the movie in mind". Her main complaint was "a collection of laughably creaky old tropes at the center … a halfhearted stop at Señor Lazy's Bargain Cliché Bin … predictable King-isms … a cutout character following a well-worn path". But she praised the novel for being "unusual in its dedication to surprising readers" and found it "a major step up from his previous book, Doctor Sleep".

== Adaptation ==
In January 2015, it was announced that Mr Mercedes would be turned into a limited television series. David E. Kelley was slated to write the project and Jack Bender would direct. Kelley and Stephen King served as executive producers. On October 10, 2017, the Audience network announced that the series would be renewed for season 2 and conclude the story from the original Mr Mercedes novel. The third season was broadcast between September and November 2019.

== See also ==
- Stephen King bibliography
