= 1983 in literature =

This article contains information about the literary events and publications of 1983.

== Events ==
- April – The Russian samizdat poet Irina Ratushinskaya is sentenced to imprisonment in a labor camp for dissident activity. While there she continues to write poetry clandestinely.
- June 2 – The Francophone Senegalese poet and politician Léopold Sédar Senghor becomes the first black African writer elected as a member of the Académie française.
- July – Barbara Cartland, who reaches the age of 82, writes 23 romantic novels this year.
- November – Bruce Bethke's short story "Cyberpunk", written in 1980, is published in Amazing Stories magazine in the United States, giving a name to the science fiction subgenre of cyberpunk.
- unknown date – Salvage for the Saint by Peter Bloxsom and John Kruse is published, as the final book in a series of novels, novellas and short stories featuring the Leslie Charteris creation "The Saint", which started in 1928. (An attempt to revive the series in 1997 is unsuccessful.)

== New books ==
=== Fiction ===
- Nelson Algren (posthumous) – The Devil's Stocking
- Isaac Asimov – The Robots of Dawn
- Greg Bear – The Wind from a Burning Woman
- Samuel Beckett – Worstward Ho
- Thomas Bernhard – The Loser (Der Untergeher)
- Jorge Luis Borges – Shakespeare's Memory (La memoria de Shakespeare, short stories)
- Marion Zimmer Bradley – The Mists of Avalon
- Morley Callaghan – A Time for Judas
- Raymond Carver – Cathedral
- J. M. Coetzee – Life and Times of Michael K
- Jackie Collins – Hollywood Wives
- Basil Copper – The House of the Wolf
- Bernard Cornwell
  - Sharpe's Sword
  - Sharpe's Enemy
- Bernard and Judy Cornwell (as Susannah Kells) – A Crowning Glory
- György Dalos – 1985
- L. Sprague de Camp
  - The Reluctant King
  - The Unbeheaded King
- Jim Dodge – Fup
- Stephen R. Donaldson – White Gold Wielder: Book Three of The Second Chronicles of Thomas Covenant
- Nora Ephron – Heartburn
- Ken Follett – On Wings of Eagles
- Ernest J. Gaines – A Gathering of Old Men
- John Gardner – Icebreaker
- Mark Helprin – Winter's Tale
- Susan Hill – The Woman in Black
- Elizabeth Jolley – Woman in a Lamp Shade
- Ernst Jünger – Aladdin's Problem
- William Kennedy – Ironweed
- Stephen King
  - Christine
  - Pet Sematary
- Dean R. Koontz – Phantoms
- Louis L'Amour – The Lonesome Gods
- Derek Lambert – The Judas Code
- John le Carré – The Little Drummer Girl
- Mary Mackey – The Last Warrior Queen
- Norman Mailer – Ancient Evenings
- James A. Michener – Poland
- R. K. Narayan – A Tiger for Malgudi
- Robert B. Parker – The Widening Gyre
- Ellis Peters
  - The Sanctuary Sparrow
  - The Devil's Novice
- Tim Powers – The Anubis Gates
- Terry Pratchett – The Colour of Magic
- Salman Rushdie – Shame
- Joanna Russ – The Zanzibar Cat
- Danielle Steel – Changes
- Peter Straub – Floating Dragon
- Walter Tevis – The Queen's Gambit
- Gore Vidal – Duluth
- Evangeline Walton – The Sword Is Forged
- Fay Weldon – The Life and Loves of a She-Devil
- A. N. Wilson – Scandal
- Robert Anton Wilson – Prometheus Rising
- Christa Wolf – Cassandra (Kassandra)
- Roger Zelazny – Unicorn Variations (stories and essays)

=== Children and young people ===
- Chris Van Allsburg – The Wreck of the Zephyr
- Jeanne-Marie Leprince de Beaumont (with Willi Glasauer) – Beauty and the Beast
- Roald Dahl – The Witches
- Lynley Dodd – Hairy Maclary from Donaldson's Dairy (first of the Hairy Maclary and Friends series)
- Mem Fox – Possum Magic
- Dick King-Smith – The Sheep-Pig (also as Babe, the Gallant Pig)
- Harold Lamb (with George Barr and Alicia Austin) - The Sea of the Ravens
- Jean Giono (with Willi Glasauer) – The Man Who Planted Trees
- Julian F. Thompson - The Grounding of Group 6

=== Drama ===
- Samuel Beckett – Nacht und Träume (television play, first broadcast)
- Ray Cooney – Run for Your Wife
- David Mamet – Glengarry Glen Ross
- Tom Murphy – The Gigli Concert
- Christina Reid – Tea in a China Cup
- Larry Shue – The Foreigner
- Neil Simon – Brighton Beach Memoirs
- Botho Strauß – The Park (Der Park)

=== Poetry ===
- Paul Durcan – Jumping the Train Tracks with Angela
- Grace Nichols – I is a long-memoried woman

=== Non-fiction ===
- Benedict Anderson – Imagined Communities
- Pascal Bruckner – The Tears of the White Man
- L. Sprague de Camp – The Fringe of the Unknown
- L. Sprague de Camp, Catherine Crook de Camp and Jane Whittington Griffin – Dark Valley Destiny
- Tom Dardis – Harold Lloyd: The Man on the Clock
- Joan Didion – Salvador
- Terry Eagleton – Literary Theory: An Introduction
- Anthony Grey – The Prime Minister Was a Spy
- Susan Oliver – Odyssey: A Daring Transatlantic Journey
- Renée Richards – Second Serve: The Renée Richards Story
- Ann Rule – Lust Killer
- Colin Thubron – Among the Russians
- A. N. Wilson – The Life of John Milton: A Biography

== Births ==
- November 17 – Christopher Paolini, American fantasy novelist
- December 6 – Jason Reynolds, African American children's novelist and poet
- unknown date – Sarah Howe, Hong Kong-born poet writing in English

== Deaths ==
- January 5 – Chapman Grant, American historian and publisher (born 1887)
- January 18 – Colin Watson, English crime fiction writer (born 1920)
- February 14 – Brita von Horn, Swedish theater director, dramatist and novelist (born 1886)
- February 18 – Robert Payne, English author, poet and biographer (born 1911)
- February 25 – Tennessee Williams (Thomas Lanier Williams III), American playwright (born 1911)
- March 3 – Hergé (Georges Prosper Remi), Belgian comics creator (born 1907)
- March 15 – Dame Rebecca West, British writer (born 1892)
- April 12 – Desmond Bagley, English novelist (complications from stroke, born 1923)
- May 4 – Shūji Terayama (寺山 修司), Japanese poet, dramatist, and film director (cirrhosis, born 1935)
- May 21 – Amal Abul-Qassem Donqol, Egyptian poet (born 1940)
- May 26 – Jack Hilton, British writer (born 1900)
- June 19 – Vilmundur Gylfason, Icelandic historian, poet and politician (suicide, born 1948)
- June 27 – Alden Nowlan, Canadian poet, novelist and playwright (born 1933)
- July 27 – Gladys Mitchell, English crime fiction writer (born 1901)
- August 12 – Mikey Smith, Jamaican dub poet (stoned to death; born 1954)
- August 18 – Sir Nikolaus Pevsner, German-born British art historian (born 1902)
- September 15 – Beverley Nichols, English writer and playwright (born 1898)
- September 16 – Roy Andries De Groot, English-born American food writer (born 1910)
- November 30 – Richard Llewellyn, British novelist (heart attack, born 1906)
- December 5 – John Robinson, English religious writer and bishop (born 1919)
- December 13 – Mary Renault, British novelist (born 1905)
- December 27 – Wilson Starbuck, American playwright and author (born 1897)

== Awards ==
- Nobel Prize for Literature: William Golding

=== Australia ===
- The Australian/Vogel Literary Award: Jenny Summerville, Shields Of Trell
- Kenneth Slessor Prize for Poetry: Vivian Smith, Tide Country
- Miles Franklin Award: No award presented

=== Canada ===
- See 1983 Governor General's Awards for a complete list of winners and finalists for those awards.

=== France ===
- Prix Goncourt: Frédérick Tristan, Les Égarés
- Prix Médicis French: Jean Echenoz, Cherokee
- Prix Médicis International: Kenneth White, La Route bleue

=== Spain ===
- Miguel de Cervantes Prize: Rafael Alberti

=== United Kingdom ===
- Booker Prize: J. M. Coetzee -Life and Times of Michael K
- Carnegie Medal for children's literature: Jan Mark, Handles
- Cholmondeley Award: John Fuller, Craig Raine, Anthony Thwaite
- Eric Gregory Award: Martin Stokes, Hilary Davies, Michael O'Neill, Lisa St Aubin De Teran, Deidre Shanahan
- James Tait Black Memorial Prize for fiction: Jonathan Keates, Allegro Postillions
- James Tait Black Memorial Prize for biography: Alan Walker, Franz Liszt: The Virtuoso Years
- Newdigate prize: Peter McDonald
- Whitbread Best Book Award: John Fuller, Flying to Nowhere

=== United States ===
- Agnes Lynch Starrett Poetry Prize: Kate Daniels, The White Wave
- Nebula Award: David Brin, Startide Rising
- Newbery Medal for children's literature: Cynthia Voigt, Dicey's Song
- Pulitzer Prize for Drama: Marsha Norman, 'Night, Mother
- Pulitzer Prize for Fiction: Alice Walker – The Color Purple
- Pulitzer Prize for Poetry: Galway Kinnell – Selected Poems
- Pulitzer Prize for History: The Transformation of Virginia, 1740–1790 by Rhys Isaac
- Pulitzer Prize for General Nonfiction: Is There No Place on Earth for Me? by Susan Sheehan

=== Elsewhere ===
- Friedenspreis des Deutschen Buchhandels: Manès Sperber
- Hugo Award for Best Novel: Foundation's Edge by Isaac Asimov
- Premio Nadal: Salvador García Aguilar, Regocijo en el hombre
