= Sequel =

Continuation of a previous work

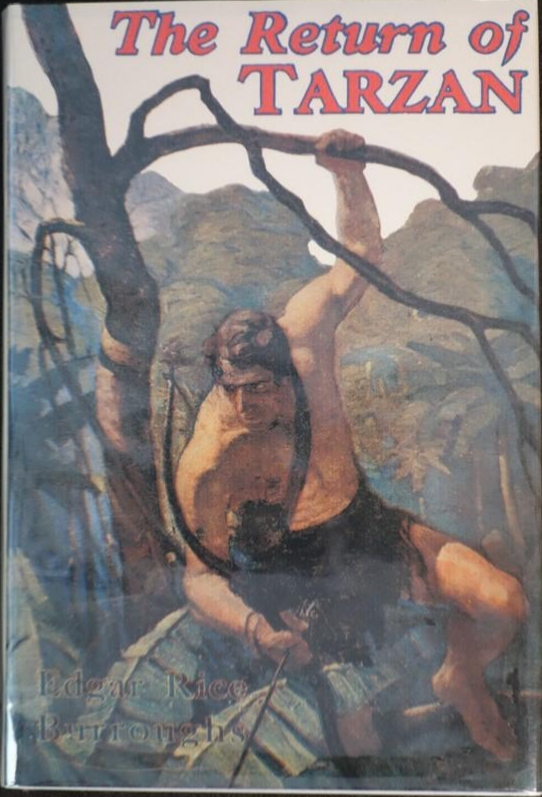
The Return of Tarzan, official sequel to Tarzan of the Apes

A sequel is a work of literature, film, theatre, television, music, or video game that continues the story of, or expands upon, some earlier work. In the common context of a narrative work of fiction, a sequel portrays events set in the same fictional universe as an earlier work, usually chronologically following the events of that work. However, non-fiction sequels in media can also exist, such as a follow-up to a documentary with new information.

In many cases, the sequel continues elements of the original story, often with the same characters and settings. A sequel can lead to a series, in which key elements appear repeatedly. The difference between more than one sequel and a series is somewhat arbitrary.

Sequels are attractive to creators and publishers because there is less risk involved in returning to a story with known popularity rather than developing new and untested characters and settings. Audiences are sometimes eager for more stories about popular characters or settings, making the production of sequels financially appealing.

In film, sequels have become very common towards the end of the twentieth century. There are many name formats for sequels. Sometimes, they either have unrelated titles or have a letter added to the end. More commonly, they have numbers at the end or have added words at the end. It is also common for a sequel to have a variation of the original title or a subtitle. In the 1930s, many musical sequels had the year included in the title. Sometimes sequels are released with different titles in different countries, because of the perceived brand recognition. There are several ways that subsequent works can be related to the chronology of the original. Various neologisms have been coined to describe them.

== Classifications ==
The most common approach for a sequel is for the events of the second work to directly follow the events of the first one, either continuing the remaining plot threads or introducing a new conflict to drive the events of the second story. Though most sequels begin some time after the events of the first work ended, some sequels pick up shortly after the first work, with the same story arc spanning over both parts. This is often called a direct sequel.

=== Prequel ===
A prequel is an installment that is made following the original product which portrays events occurring chronologically before those of the original work. Although its name is based on the word sequel, not all prequels are true prequels that are part of a main series. Prequels that are not part of a main series are called spin-off prequels, while prequels that are part of a main series are called true prequels.

=== Midquel ===
A midquel is a work which takes place between events. Types include interquels and intraquels. An interquel is a story that takes place in between two previously published or released stories. For example, if 'movie C' is an interquel of 'movies A' and 'B', the events of 'movie C' take place after the events of 'movie A', but before the events of 'movie B'. Examples include, Rogue One (2016) and Solo (2018) of the Star Wars franchise, Saw X (2023), Alien: Romulus (2024), and Ballerina (2025). An intraquel, on the other hand, is a work which focuses on events within a previous work (such as during a time skip), with examples including The Lion King 1½ (2004) and Bambi II (2006).

=== Legacy sequel ===
A legacy sequel is a work that follows the continuity of the original works, but takes place much further along the timeline, often focusing on new characters with the elderly original characters still present in the plot. They are often made many years after the original works were made. Legacy sequels are sometimes also direct sequels that ignore previous installments entirely, effectively retconning preceding events. Film journalist Pamela McClintock describes a legacy sequel as something that "exploits goodwill toward the past while launching a new generation of actors and stories".

=== Standalone sequel ===
A standalone sequel is a work which is set in the same universe as a prior work, yet has little or no narrative connection to its predecessor, and can stand on its own without a thorough understanding of the series or previous installment(s).

=== Spiritual sequel ===
A spiritual sequel, also known as a spiritual successor, is a work inspired by its predecessor. It shares the same styles, genres and elements as its predecessor, but has no direct connection to it at all. Most spiritual sequels are also set in different universes from their predecessors, and some spiritual sequels aren't even a part of their predecessor's franchise, making them non-franchise sequels. Spiritual sequels can sometimes be repurposed from material originally intended to be direct sequels.

=== Parallel ===
A parallel, paraquel, or sidequel is a story that runs at the same point in time as the original story. For instance, three different novels by John Morressy—Starbrat (1972), Stardrift (1973; also known as Nail Down the Stars) and Under a Calculating Star (1975)—involve different lead characters, mostly in different places, but overlap at one dramatic event to which each novel provides a different perspective.

== Relatives ==
Alongside sequels, there are also other types of continuation or inspiration of a previous work.

A spin-off is a work that is not a sequel to any previous works, but is set in the same universe. It is a separate work-on-its-own in the same franchise as the series of other works. Spin-offs are often focused on one or more of the minor characters from the other work or new characters in the same universe as the other work.

A crossover is a work where characters or events from two previous works from different franchises are meeting in the same universe. Crossovers can also function as sequels if plotlines from the two previous works continue into them.

A reboot is a start over from a previous work. It could either be a film set in a new universe resembling the old one or it could be a regular spin-off film that starts a new film series. Reboots are usually a part of the same media franchise as the previous works, but not always. Kathleen Loock has written that traditional reboots tended to stray away from depicting direct narrative or stylistic correlations to the previous versions of the franchise. Contemporary reboots lean into the nostalgia factor and create new stories that simultaneously revel in the aspects of the original franchise that made it notable in the first place.

== History ==
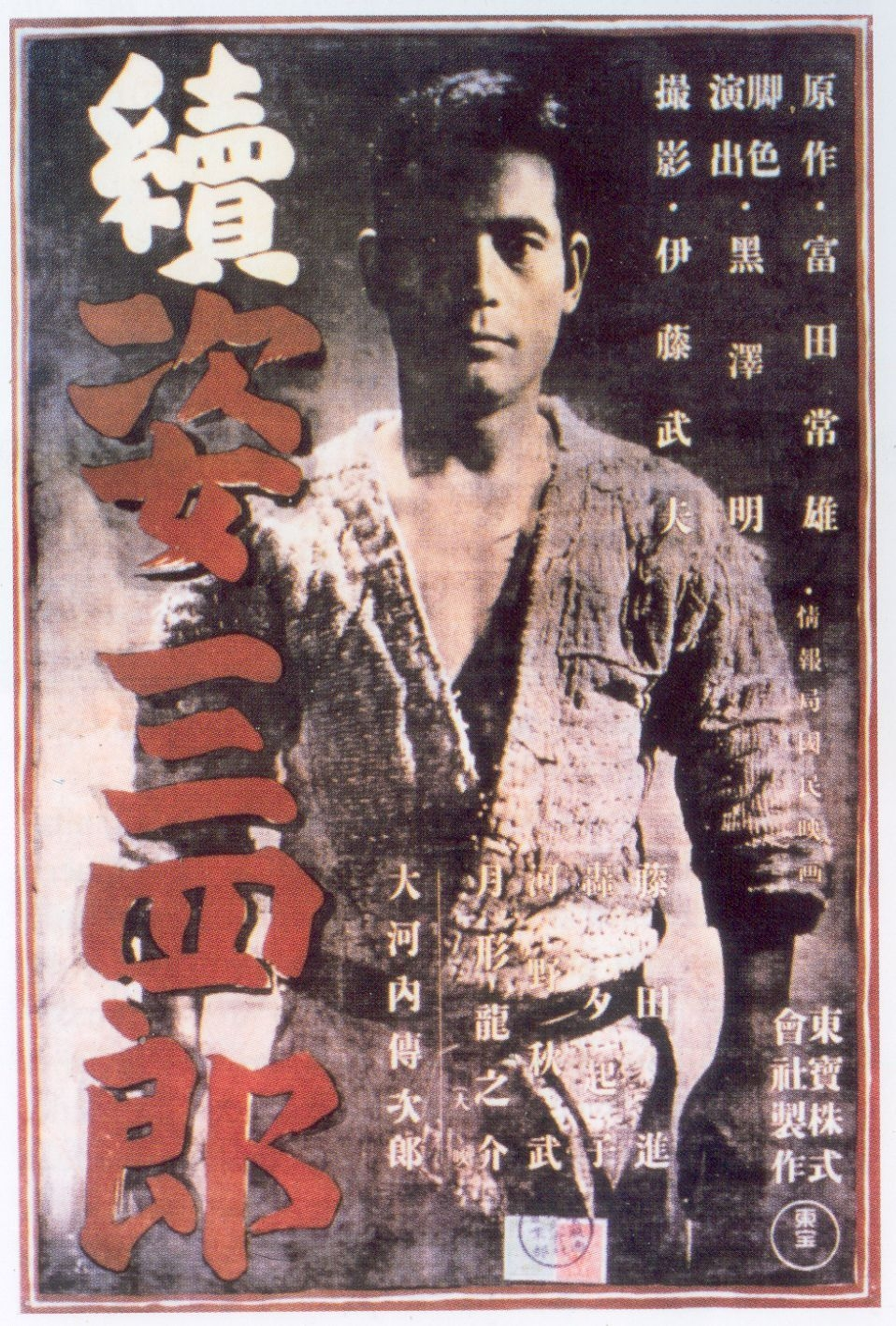
Sanshiro Sugata Part II (1945) by Akira Kurosawa was the earliest numbered sequel in the history of cinema.

In The Afterlife of a Character, David Brewer describes a reader's desire to "see more", or to know what happens next in the narrative after it has ended.

Akira Kurosawa's Sanshiro Sugata Part II (1945) was the earliest-numbered sequel in the history of cinema. Film director Francis Ford Coppola claims to have popularized the trend of including numbers in film sequel titles with The Godfather Part II (1974).

=== Sequels of the novel ===
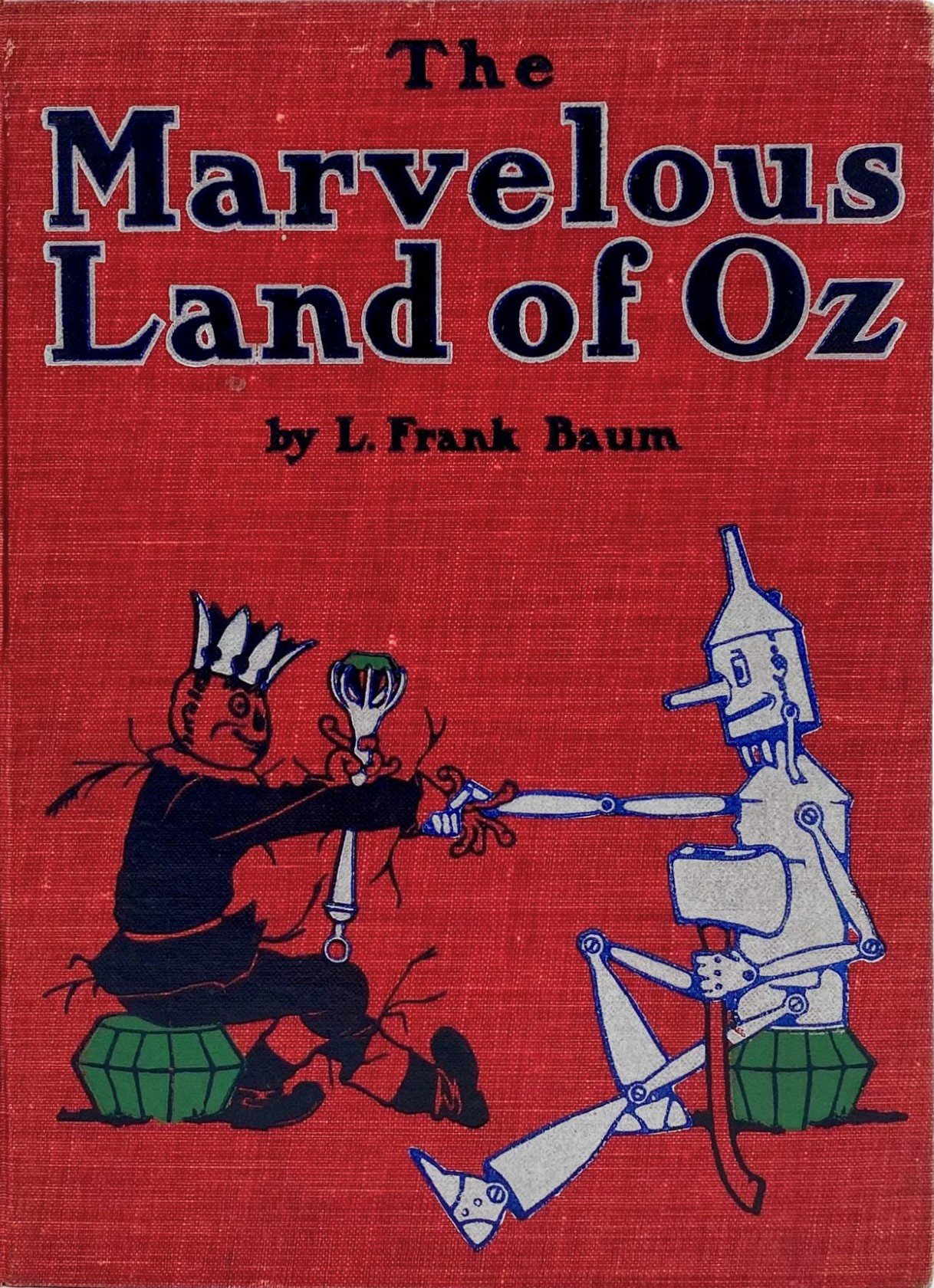
The Marvelous Land of Oz, sequel to The Wonderful Wizard of Oz, was an official sequel novel written to satisfy popular demand.

The origin of the sequel as it is conceived in the 21st century developed from the novella and romance traditions in a slow process that culminated towards the end of the 17th century.

The substantial shift toward a rapidly growing print culture and the rise of the market system by the early 18th century meant that an author's merit and livelihood became increasingly linked to the number of copies of a work they could sell. This shift from a text-based to an author-centered reading culture led to the "professionalization" of the author—that is, the development of a "sense of identity based on a marketable skill and on supplying to a defined public a specialized service it was demanding." In one sense, then, sequels became a means to profit further from previous work that had already obtained some measure of commercial success. As the establishment of a readership became increasingly important to the economic viability of authorship, sequels offered a means to establish a recurring economic outlet.

In addition to serving economic profit, the sequel was also used as a method to strengthen an author's claim to his literary property. With weak copyright laws and unscrupulous booksellers willing to sell whatever they could, in some cases the only way to prove ownership of a text was to produce another like it. Sequels in this sense are rather limited in scope, as the authors are focused on producing "more of the same" to defend their "literary paternity". As is true throughout history, sequels to novels provided an opportunity for authors to interact with a readership. This became especially important in the economy of the 18th-century novel, in which authors often maintained readership by drawing readers back with the promise of more of what they liked from the original. With sequels, therefore, came the implicit division of readers by authors into the categories of "desirable" and "undesirable"—that is, those who interpret the text in a way unsanctioned by the author. Only after having achieved a significant reader base would an author feel free to alienate or ignore the "undesirable" readers.

This concept of "undesirable" readers extends to unofficial sequels with the 18th-century novel. While in certain historical contexts unofficial sequels were actually the norm (for an example, see Arthurian literature), with the emphasis on the author function that arises in conjunction with the novel many authors began to see these kinds of unauthorized extensions as being in direct conflict with authorial authority. In the matter of Don Quixote (an early novel, perhaps better classified as a satirical romance), for example, Cervantes disapproved of Alonso Fernández de Avellaneda's use of his characters in Second Volume of the Ingenious Gentleman Don Quixote of La Mancha, an unauthorized sequel. In response, Cervantes very firmly kills the protagonist at the end of the Second Part to discourage any more such creative liberties. Another example is Samuel Richardson, an 18th-century author who responded particularly strongly against the appropriation of his material by unauthorized third parties. Richardson was extremely vocal in his disapproval of the way the protagonist of his novel Pamela was repeatedly incorporated into unauthorized sequels featuring particularly lewd plots. The most famous of these is Henry Fielding's parody, entitled Shamela.

In To Renew Their Former Acquaintance: Print, Gender, and Some Eighteenth Century Sequels, Betty Schellenberg theorizes that whereas for male writers in the 18th century sequels often served as "models of paternity and property", for women writers these models were more likely to be seen as transgressive. Instead, the recurring readership created by sequels let female writers function within the model of "familiar acquaintances reunited to enjoy the mutual pleasures of conversation", and made their writing an "activity within a private, non-economic sphere". Through this created perception women writers were able to break into the economic sphere and "enhance their professional status" through authorship.

Dissociated from the motives of profit and therefore unrestrained by the need for continuity felt by male writers, Schellenberg argues that female-authored sequel fiction tended to have a much broader scope. He says that women writers showed an "innovative freedom" that male writers rejected to "protect their patrimony". For example, Sarah Fielding's Adventures of David Simple and its sequels Familiar Letters between the Principal Characters in David Simple and David Simple, Volume the Last are extremely innovative and cover almost the entire range of popular narrative styles of the 18th century.

=== Video games ===
The cost of developing AAA video games has increased significantly over recent years, often reaching tens or even hundreds of millions of dollars due to high expectations for detailed graphics, expansive worlds, and advanced gameplay. Video game companies have turned to sequels as a dependable business strategy. Sequels are now a dominant trend in the industry, making up a large proportion of new releases from major publishers.

One reason they are prevalent is their ability to provide a stable revenue stream in a volatile market. Building on an existing brand with an established fan base, sequels are perceived as safer investments than new intellectual properties (IP). They allow companies to capitalize on previous successes, ensuring a built-in audience and reducing the financial risk associated with launching a new and unproven concept. Additionally, sequels of a formula that players already enjoy, balancing familiarity with new features or improvements, can increase player retention and positive reception.

== Media franchises ==
In some cases, the characters or the settings of an original film or video game become so valuable that they develop into a series, lately referred to as a media franchise. Generally, a whole series of sequels is made, along with merchandising. Multiple sequels are often planned well in advance, and actors and directors may sign extended contracts to ensure their participation. This can extend into a series/franchise's initial production's plot to provide story material to develop for sequels, called sequel hooks. Examples of major media franchises include the James Bond, Marvel Cinematic Universe, Pokémon, Harry Potter, and Disney Princess.

=== Box office ===
Movie sequels do not always do as well at the box office as the original, but they tend to do better than non-sequels, according to a study in the July 2008 issue of the Journal of Business Research. The shorter the period between releases, the better the sequel does at the box office. Sequels also show a faster drop in weekly revenues relative to non-sequels. A quantitative mega-analysis of box office earnings from all the major movie studios revealed that franchise movies dominate the highest-grossing films lists, establishing sequels as a reliable kind of movie to make. All studios have come to rely on releasing sequels as they increase the studios' profitability, yield to the consumer demand for simultaneous novelty and familiarity, and help manage risk and uncertainty within studio production and release.

=== Sequels in other media ===
Sequels are most often produced in the same medium as the previous work (e.g., a film sequel is usually a sequel to another film). Producing sequels to a work in another medium has also become common, especially when the new medium is less costly or time-consuming to produce.

A sequel to a popular but discontinued television series may be produced in another medium, thereby bypassing whatever factors led to the series' cancellation, such as Serenity (sequel to Firefly), Downton Abbey: A New Era (sequel to Downton Abbey), and Veronica Mars (sequel to Veronica Mars).

Some highly popular movies and television series have inspired the production of multiple novel sequels, sometimes rivaling or even dwarfing the volume of works in the original medium.

For example, the 1956 novel The Hundred and One Dalmatians, its 1961 animated adaptation, and that film's 1996 live-action remake each have a sequel unrelated to the other sequels: respectively, The Starlight Barking (1967), 101 Dalmatians II: Patch's London Adventure (2003, direct to video), and 102 Dalmatians (2000).

== Unofficial sequels ==
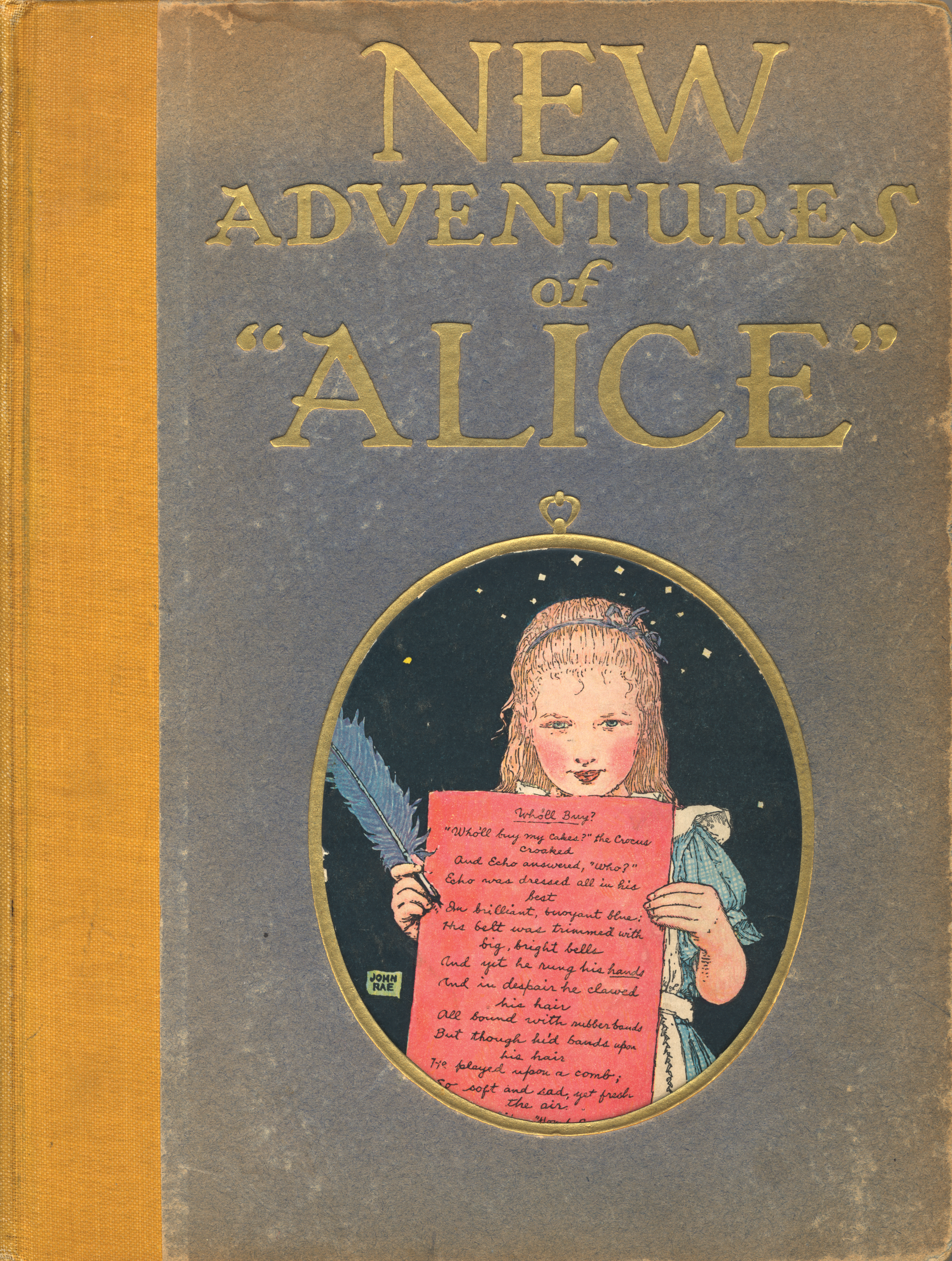
New Adventures of Alice, 1917, John Rae

Sometimes sequels are produced without the consent of the creator of the original work. These may be dubbed unofficial, informal, unauthorized, or illegitimate sequels. In some cases, the work is in the public domain, and there is no legal obstacle to producing sequels. In other cases, the original creator or their heirs may assert copyrights, and challenge the creators of the sequels.

=== Literary ===
- Old Friends and New Fancies: An Imaginary Sequel to the Novels of Jane Austen (1913) is a novel by Sybil G. Brinton that is generally acknowledged to be the first sequel to the works of Jane Austen and as such the first piece of Austen fan fiction.
- Porto Bello Gold (1924), a prequel by A. D. Howden Smith to Treasure Island that was written with explicit permission from Robert Louis Stevenson's executor, tells the origin of the buried treasure and recasts many of Stevenson's pirates in their younger years, giving the hidden treasure some Jacobite antecedents not mentioned in the original.
- Back to Treasure Island (1935) is a sequel by H. A. Calahan, the introduction of which argues that Robert Louis Stevenson wanted to write a continuation of the story.
- Heidi Grows Up (a.k.a. Heidi Grows Up: A Sequel to Heidi) is a 1938 novel and sequel to Johanna Spyri's 1881 novel Heidi, written by Spyri's French and English translator, Charles Tritten, after a three-decade-long period of pondering what to write, since Spyri's death gave no sequel of her own.
- Manly Wade Wellman and his son Wade Wellman wrote Sherlock Holmes's War of the Worlds (1975), which describes Sherlock Holmes's adventures during the Martian occupation of London. This version uses H. G. Wells's short story "The Crystal Egg" as a prequel (with Holmes being the man who bought the egg at the end) and includes a crossover with Arthur Conan Doyle's Professor Challenger stories. Among many changes the Martians are changed into simple vampires, who suck and ingest human blood.
- In The Space Machine (1976), Christopher Priest presents both a sequel and prequel to The War of the Worlds (due to time travel elements), which also integrates the events of The Time Machine.
- György Dalos wrote the novel 1985 that was intended as a direct sequel to George Orwell's work.
- Alice Through the Needle's Eye (1984) by Gilbert Adair – a sequel to Lewis Carroll's Alice in Wonderland books
- The novelist Angela Carter was working on a sequel to Jane Eyre at the time of her death in 1992. This was to have been the story of Jane's stepdaughter Adèle Varens and her mother Céline. Only a synopsis survives.
- Mrs. Rochester: A Sequel to Jane Eyre (1997) by Hilary Bailey
- The Last Ringbearer (Russian: Последний кольценосец, Posledniy kol'tsenosets) (1999) is a fantasy book by Russian author Kirill Eskov. It is an alternative account of, and an informal sequel to, the events of J. R. R. Tolkien's The Lord of the Rings.

== See also ==
- Book series
- Cliffhanger
- Film series
- Klinger v. Conan Doyle Estate, Ltd.
- List of video game franchises
- List of film sequels by box-office performance
- Pentalogy
- Prequel
- List of prequels
- Remake
- Shared universe
- Spiritual successor
- Standalone film
- Tetralogy
- Trilogy
