= The Fallible Fiend =

Book by Lyon Sprague de Camp

- First book edition
- Author: L. Sprague de Camp
- Language: English
- Series: Novarian series
- Genre: Fantasy
- Publisher: Signet Books
- Publication date: February, 1973
- Publication place: United States
- Media type: Print (paperback)
- Pages: 143
- ISBN: 0-345-29367-3
- OCLC: 7498943
- Preceded by: "The Emperor's Fan"
- Followed by: The Goblin Tower

The Fallible Fiend is a fantasy novel by American writer L. Sprague de Camp, the third book of his Novarian series. It was first published as a two-part serial in the magazine Fantastic for December 1972 and February 1973, and subsequently expanded and revised for book publication. The novel was first published in book form as a paperback by Signet Books in 1973; it was later reprinted by Remploy (1974), Sphere (1978), Del Rey/Ballantine (1981), Baen (1992) and the Thorndike Press (2002). The Remploy edition was both the first British and first hardcover edition. An e-book edition was published by Gollancz's SF Gateway imprint on September 29, 2011 as part of a general release of de Camp's works in electronic form. It has also been translated into German and Italian.

== Plot summary ==
On the demonic Twelfth Plane, the demon Zdim Akh's son is drafted for a year's indentured servitude on the human Prime Plane, the demon society having an agreement to provide service to human sorcerers in return for supplies of iron, a raw material it desperately needs.

Zdim is duly summoned to the Prime Plane by the sorcerer Dr. Maldivius of Novaria. There he strives to do his duty, but his demonic literal-mindedness hampers him. Assigned to protect the Sibylline Sapphire from any trespassers, he promptly eats Maldivius' apprentice Grax when the latter intrudes.

Similar misadventures result in the disgusted Maldivius selling his contract, and the demon is passed from one master to another, from circus master Bagardo to the rich widow Roska of Ir, all the while doing his level best to figure out what the muddled humans truly wish of him.

Against all odds he becomes a hero when he recruits aid for the city-state of Ir after it discounts intelligence of an imminent invasion by the cannibal Paaluans. Returning to his home plane early and with extra iron, he resolves never again to leave the comforts of the Twelfth Plane — until he realizes how dull it is compared with the picturesque insanity of the human realm...

By internal chronology, The Fallible Fiend is the second story in the Novarian series, coming after the short story "The Emperor's Fan", which is set centuries before the others, and prior to the Reluctant King trilogy. (The Paaluan invasion of Ir is mentioned in the second and third books of the trilogy, The Clocks of Iraz and The Unbeheaded King, respectively, as an event occurring either recently or some generations past.)

== Setting ==
The world of which Novaria is part is a parallel world to Earth, a plane of existence related to ours in that ours constitutes its afterlife. Culturally it bears resemblances to the eras of both Classical Greece and Medieval Europe. The states of Novaria itself are split between competing systems of government, some of them unique, which allows the author to explore various pros and cons of different styles of governance as his hero tours the country.

The name of Ir, the subterranean city-state where much the plot takes place, is simply the Hebrew word for "city" (עיר).

== Features ==
Adopting the viewpoint of an outsider to comment on the foibles of one's own society has been done before in fiction, but adapting it to fantasy also permits him to extend it into an outside view of humanity as a whole by an alien being and maintain a satirical edge throughout the book. De Camp's demonic protagonist Zdim long remained a uniquely unlikely fantasy hero, as other authors were slow to mine the concept de Camp pioneered.

== Reception ==
Al Nofi in Amra, observing that the book "has neither characters nor plot line in common with the earlier pair" of Novarian novels, finds this "a very good move on Mr. de Camp's part; it saves the work needed to construct a credible ethos yet gives the author an opportunity to work with new characters and situations." Noting that "Mr. de Camp, of course, has been doing unusual things with his swords and sorcery for years," he calls the demon Zdim Akh's son "a most unusual hero indeed," "one of de Camp's best heroes yet; to me, he seems more human, even, than the hordes of breech-clothed, shaggy-haired giants with names all ending in -ar who romp through countless S & S sagas. All in all, this is a fine book."

Roger C. Schlobin praises the book's "[d]elightful episodes occur[ring] as the fiend misunderstands his commands and tries to function in a totally alien environment, which is, of course, quite normal for the reader." He feels it "[d]eteriorates somewhat at the end as the fiend becomes a hero and saves civilization.

Brian M. Stableford calls "The Fallible Fiend ... more offbeat than de Camp's other ventures in the genre," and Zdim "perhaps the only sword-and-sorcery hero who regularly devours people. Still, he remains likable as he provides a suitably ironic commentary on human affairs from the demonic standpoint."

Steven Silver called the book "a humorous novel, although not in a laugh-out-loud way." He sees its "main point [as] satire, a fact which is driven home if the reader begins to look at characterization or plot, neither of which appear in particular abundance. ... The characters are drawn with broad strokes, each inspired by one, or possibly two, character traits." But "as [with] most satire, he causes the reader[s] to recognize the humor of the situation and compare it to their own situation." Silver sees "Zdim's travels throughout Novaria as a pretext for unleashing slings and arrows of outrageous satire at governmental practices and systems ... thereby highlighting the follies of our own system of government." The hero's contact with other cultures, the "fantasy staples" of "the semi-human Zaperazh, the horse nomadic Hruntings, and the cannibalistic Paaluans ... clearly shows why each is as implausible as the more 'corrupt' human institutions of civilizations."

Don D'Ammassa finds "The Fallible Fiend ... in much the same vein" as The Reluctant King series, with "[m]ost of the humor com[ing] from the efforts by the demon to understand human behavior."

Mike Ashley called the story "a wonderfully nostalgic fantasy in the Unknown tradition."

== Awards ==
In its original serial form the book won the British Fantasy Society's 1973 August Derleth Fantasy Award for best short story.

Preceded by "The Emperor's Fan"	Novarian series The Fallible Fiend	Succeeded by The Goblin Tower
