= Novaria =

Novaria is the ancient name for the city of Novara in Piedmont, Italy.

In fiction, Novaria may also refer to:

- The setting of the Novarian series of fantasy novels by L. Sprague de Camp.
- The setting of the Crown of Stars series of fantasy novels by Kate Elliott.
