= The Reluctant King =

Series of fantasy novels by L. Sprague de Camp

- first edition of The Reluctant King
- Author: L. Sprague de Camp
- Cover artist: Ron Walotsky
- Language: English
- Series: Novarian series
- Genre: Fantasy
- Publisher: Doubleday
- Publication date: February, 1983
- Publication place: United States
- Media type: Print (paperback)
- Pages: 533
- Preceded by: The Fallible Fiend
- Followed by: The Honorable Barbarian

The Reluctant King is the overall title of a trilogy of fantasy novels written by L. Sprague de Camp as part of his Novarian series, as well as the 1983 omnibus collection gathering the books together into one volume. The trilogy features de Camp's sword and sorcery hero King Jorian of Xylar, and is composed of The Goblin Tower (1968), The Clocks of Iraz (1971) and The Unbeheaded King (1983). The omnibus was first published in hardcover by Nelson Doubleday in 1983 as an offering for its Science Fiction Book Club, and was reissued in paperback by Baen Books in 1996.

== Plot summary ==
The trilogy follows the adventures of ex-king Jorian, a native of the village of Ardamai in the kingdom of Kortoli, one of the twelve city-states of Novaria. Jorian is a powerful and intelligent man who has trained extensively for a life of adventure but is hampered by garrulousness and a weakness for drink and women.

When first seen, Jorian is the reluctant king of Xylar, another Novarian city-state. The Xylarians select their king every five years by executing the reigning monarch and tossing his head into a crowd; the man who catches it becomes the next king (despite the terrible end awaiting the victor in this contest, there is never a lack of candidates, intentional or otherwise...). Jorian, having been selected for the position five years before, is at the end of his term as ruler. He miraculously escapes his fate with the aid of the Mulvanian sorcerer Dr. Karadur.

The tale continues through a pair of spectacularly disastrous quests in aid of his savior, the first taking them through the exotic lands of Mulvan, Komilakh and Shven and the second south to the ancient empire of Penembei.

In the course of the later adventure Jorian is tapped to be ruler of Penembei, an office nearly as hazardous as that of king of Xylar. Adroitly ducking this second crown, he endeavors to recover from Xylar his favorite wife Estrildis, with whom he hopes to retire to a life of quiet obscurity, only to have things once again go wrong...

== Setting ==
The world of which Novaria is part is a parallel world to Earth, a plane of existence related to ours in that ours constitutes its afterlife. Culturally it bears resemblances to the eras of both Classical Greece and Medieval Europe. Mankind shares this world with other intelligent beings, like the serpent people of Beraoti, the beast-men of Komilakh, and the silvans of the mountain forests. The fauna is largely that of Earth's Ice Age, while the vegetation is similar to that of present-day Earth.

Novaria's world is one in which the supernatural element is dominant. Magic works, though in a strictly logical fashion that often leaves its practitioners dissatisfied. Gods are real and strongly influence mortal affairs, communicating with their worshippers through dreams and granting them favors if paid homage. They grow weaker without this, and will eventually fade away if entirely bereft. Gods also require statues of themselves as foci to enter the material world. Demons can, and often are, summoned from other planes of existence, which Novarians number in relation to their own (which to them is the Prime Plane).

Novaria itself is a broad isthmus joining two continental masses to the north and the south. The northern continent consists primarily of the steppe country of Shven, with the pirate isles of Algarth off its western coast and the land of Hroth to the north. The southern continent contains the empire of Penembei and the desert of Fedirun to the south of Novaria and the jungles of Mulvan and Komilakh to the southeast; other lands, notably Beraoti, lie further south.

Novaria is separated from the northern continent by the high Ellorna Mountains and from the southern by the great Logram Mountains. On its other sides it drains into the Western Ocean and the Inner Sea, which communicates with the Eastern Ocean via the smaller Sea of Sikhon. Across the Eastern Ocean are the archipelagos known as the Peppercorns, Salimor, and Gwoling, and an eastern continent on which is found the great empire of Kuromon and another nomad-inhabited steppe belt.

Across the Western Ocean is the country of the cannibal Paaluan sea raiders; as these are also stated (in The Honorable Barbarian) to be a threat in the Eastern Ocean, there is evidently a navigable sea passage around either the main Novarian continent or the eastern continent, or both.

Novaria is a land with a single language and culture, divided politically into mutually-competing city states - reminiscent of Classical Greece and Renaissance Italy. The twelve city-states into which Novaria is split are Solymbria, Boaktis, Tarxia, Zolon, Ir, Metouro, Govannion, Aussar, Xylar, Othomae, Kortoli and Vindium.

The Twelve Cities are ruled under a wide variety of competing governmental systems, some of them unique. For instance, Solymbria is an archonate whose leader is selected by random drawing, Boaktis is a dictatorship, Tarxia is a theocracy, Zolon is an island ruled by its navy, Ir is under the control of a syndicate of plutocrats, Metouro is ruled by a secret society, Xylar chooses its kings by lot and beheads each after a five-year term, Othomae divides civil and military power between a Grand Duke and a Grand Bastard, respectively the eldest legitimate and illegitimate sons of the previous Grand Duke, Kortoli is a traditional hereditary monarchy, and Vindium a republic of the classical variety. This allows the author to explore pros and cons of different modes of governance as his hero tours the region.

As for other countries, Shven and Fedirun are home to nomads patterned after the Mongols and Beduin, respectively, Mulvan is a caste-bound empire combining features of India, China and Persia, and Iraz, divided from Mulvan by Fedirun, is modeled on the Byzantine Empire. The jungles of Komilakh east of Mulvan are inhabited by beast men, and the far-off islands of Salimor in the Eastern Ocean comprise a monarchy mingling elements of Japan and the Philippines. The distant empire of Kuromon is based on China and Japan.

== Features ==
The trilogy is one of de Camp's most innovative works of fantasy, and not only in its use of politics. It inverts the "rags to royalty" pattern characteristic of much heroic fantasy by featuring a protagonist fleeing an unwanted crown, and flatly refusing two new offers of a crown made in later episodes. At the end of The Clocks of Iraz, Jorian declares:

I've had my taste of kinging it. Wilst 'twas fun in a way, I have no wish to go back to it. Many lust for the wealth, power and glory that kingship entails, but I harbor no such lordly ambitions. A simple life, with a respectable trade, a snug house, plenty to eat and drink, a loving family and congenial cronies will suffice me.

When last seen, at the end of The Unbeheaded King, he has achieved precisely that (though not with the wife with whom he originally hoped to share his middle-class bliss).

Another feature of the books is their frequent use of folk tales integrated into the plot (Jorian is a storyteller) to painlessly convey something of the background and history of the invented world. This device obviates the need for lengthy appendices, as in The Lord of the Rings. While each book in the trilogy makes use of the device, its use is heaviest in The Goblin Tower. Some of these tales also feature satires of ideas from established political and religious ideologies on Earth (e.g. that all material concerns should be renounced to obtain spiritual liberation, or that crime is only a result of lacking resources which can be solved through welfare programs).

== Sources ==
- Library of Congress Catalog

Preceded by The Fallible Fiend	Novarian series The Reluctant King (= The Goblin Tower, The Clocks of Iraz, and The Unbeheaded King	Succeeded by The Honorable Barbarian
