= The Honorable Barbarian =

Book by Lyon Sprague de Camp

- First edition
- Author: L. Sprague de Camp
- Cover artist: Darrell K. Sweet
- Language: English
- Series: Novarian series
- Genre: Fantasy
- Publisher: Del Rey Books
- Publication date: 1989
- Publication place: United States
- Media type: Print (hardback)
- Pages: 240
- ISBN: 0-345-36091-5
- OCLC: 19457644
- Dewey Decimal: 813/.52 19
- LC Class: PS3507.E2344 H6 1989
- Preceded by: The Unbeheaded King

The Honorable Barbarian is a fantasy novel by American writer L. Sprague de Camp, the fifth and final book of his Novarian series. It is a sequel both to the "Reluctant King" trilogy and to the Novarian sequence's only short story, "The Emperor's Fan". It was first published in hardcover by Del Rey Books in July 1989, with a limited edition hardcover following from The Easton Press in its "Signed First Editions of Science Fiction" series in August of the same year. Another hardcover edition issued by Del Rey in conjunction with the Science Fiction Book Club appeared in January 1990. The first paperback edition was issued by Del Rey in May 1990. The novel has also been translated into French. An E-book edition was published as The Honourable Barbarian by Gollancz's SF Gateway imprint on September 29, 2011 as part of a general release of de Camp's works in electronic form.

== Plot summary ==
Jorian, ex-king of Xylar, has had enough adventures to last a lifetime. But when his brother Kerin, youngest son of Evor the Clockmaker, commits an indiscretion with Adeliza, a neighbor's daughter, he is packed off on a hasty quest to uncover the secret of an advanced clock escapement for the family firm. A pragmatic, cautious sort, he preps for his journey with a crash course from his experienced brother in useful skills—swordsmanship and foreign tongues, of course, but also lying and burglary. He is hampered and sometimes aided by the sprite Belinka, commissioned by the calculating Adeliza to ensure Kerin's faithfulness.

Kerin's goal takes him east across the Inner Sea, the Sea of Sikhon and the Eastern Ocean to the empire of Kuromon, where he is promised the secret in return for a magical fan lost centuries before. It has the property of making whatever it is waved at disappear without a trace. Along the way he must contend with a treacherous sea captain and his suspicious navigator, the duplicitous sorcerer Pwana, and the pirate crew of Malgo, who has a grudge against Kerin's family.

A more pleasant complication is Nogiri, a princess of the island empire of Salimor, whom Kerin has liberated (much to the displeasure of Belinka) from the pirates. Kerin returns her to Salimor only to lose her to the nefarious designs of Pwana, and a dire fate from which she can only be preserved by a daring rescue on roller skates.

Finally Kuromon is reached and negotiations are concluded satisfactorily, but only at the cost of an unexpected regime change.

== Setting ==
As with the rest of the parallel world in which Novaria is located, de Camp bases the countries visited on Medieval realms of our own world. Thus Kuromon combines elements of ancient Japan and China, while the eastern islands are reminiscent of both Japan and Southeast Asia.

== Reception ==
Jackie Cassada in Library Journal a "picaresque comic-fantasy adventure by the author of The Unbeheaded King", and judged it appropriate "[f]or most fantasy collections."

The book was also reviewed in Voice of Youth Advocates v. 12, 1990, and by Darrell Schweitzer in Aboriginal Science Fiction, January/February 1990. Earl Wells surveys the book along with the rest of the series in Salem Press Encyclopedia of Literature, 2019.

Preceded by The Unbeheaded King	Novarian series The Honorable Barbarian	Succeeded by The Sedulous Sprite (unpublished)
