= Such Is My Beloved =

Book by Morley Callaghan

- Author: Morley Callaghan
- Language: English
- Publication date: 1934

Such Is My Beloved is a novel by Canadian writer Morley Callaghan. It was first published in 1934 by Charles Scribner's Sons in New York City and Macmillan of Canada in Toronto.

== Plot ==
Such Is My Beloved takes place in a city experiencing the economic hardships of the Great Depression. The main character is Father Stephen Dowling, a young, exuberant priest searching for the meaning of God's love. Dowling decides to try to help two young prostitutes, Ronnie and Midge, turn their lives around. The priest goes to great lengths to try to help them, such as giving them money and clothes, while trying to find them jobs. As the story progresses, Dowling becomes increasingly involved in the girls’ lives. He exhibits agape, a Greco-Christian term referring to the love of God, for the prostitutes and does everything he can to help them redeem their lives. His relationship with the prostitutes is condemned by his rich, self-righteous parishioners and his bishop. In the end, the girls are arrested for prostitution. Dowling feels that he has failed the girls and becomes grief-stricken. His anguish over the girls’ fate causes him to lose his sanity and subsequently he is removed from the church and sent away to an insane asylum. In the end, Dowling has a moment of clarity in which he sacrifices his own sanity to God to spare the girls’ souls. The novel closes on his realization of the purely Christian love he bears for Ronnie, Midge and for all of humanity.

== Setting ==
Such Is My Beloved is set in a modern city (easily identifiable as Toronto) in Canada during the Great Depression. It is set in a generic society so that the reader does not get caught up in the location, but rather focuses on the story and characters. The setting is bland so that the social problems in the novel are more readily recognized and are easily contrasted. The major turning points in the novel occur in two locations, the hotel room where Ronnie and Midge live in the inner city, and the cathedral where Dowling encounters the Bishop. Such Is My Beloved begins in the winter, and ends in the springtime. Because it is set in the 1930s during the Great Depression, the city in which the novel takes place seems slightly run down and a bit dingy, but is for the most part a decent place to live. The hard times of the Depression are evident in the downtown area where Ronnie and Midge live. The setting also functions to create an atmosphere of sympathy for the girls, and is often used to overshadow that they are prostitutes, but because times are hard, what they do to earn an income is eventually accepted by the reader.

== Analysis ==
This novel can be seen as a religious allegory, by placing certain characters in the shoes of Jesus, Judas, and Mary Magdalene. Like Jesus, Dowling sacrifices himself to save the souls of the people. Dowling saves Ronnie and Midge, and in doing so sacrifices his sanity. The setting of the novel also correlates with the life of Jesus, as the story begins in winter near Christmas and ends in the spring, coinciding with Easter.

== Characters ==
Father Stephen Dowling - Dowling is young, white-faced, and enthusiastic. The white face symbolizes his innocence; his innocence mixed with his enthusiasm makes him quite naïve in serving in his parish, especially with visiting the prostitutes. With his enthusiasm and conviction to serving God, he parallels with Jesus, in that Jesus was also passionate with obeying and serving.

Ronnie - Veronica 'Ronnie' Olsen is a tall, thin, fair haired woman. She is a prostitute and lives in a hotel room with Midge, another prostitute. Ronnie parallels with Martha in the bible. “Martha served Jesus when he visited. ‘But Martha was distracted by all the preparations that had to be made.’”(Luke 10:40) Ronnie is more confident in what she believes and how she acts, and it takes a while for Dowling to make an impression on her.

Midge - Catherine 'Midge' Bourassa is heavier set, short, with dark brown eyes, and black hair. Also a prostitute, Midge lives with Ronnie in the hotel. Midge is unlike Ronnie in that she is impressionable and welcomes Dowling. It is still quite hard for Dowling to convert her to his beliefs though, because she is influenced by Ronnie.

Mr. Robison - Mr. Robison is a strong influential man in the church parish. He is big, handsome, and white haired, with a florid face.

Mrs. Robison - Robison's wife, a hypocritical woman, condemns Dowling and his actions. She is disapproving of the girls and believes that they don't deserve the church's help.

The Bishop - The Bishop is the leader in the church. He has a large, dark face, swift moving eyes, and a double chin. The Bishop parallels with the leader Pontius Pilate in that they both condemn the innocent.

Father Anglin - Anglin is another priest in Dowling's church. He parallels with the Pharisees and the Sadducees. He has a lack of faith and tries to cover it up by appearing good and holy by standing in Dowling's way of doing good.

Charlie Stewart - Stewart is a young friend of Dowling's. He is a medical student and an atheist, but enjoys Dowling's company. They often discussed aspects of society and social issues. Charlie is the first-person Dowling approaches when asking for money to help Ronnie and Midge.

Lou - Lou is Midge and Ronnie's pimp. He dislikes Father Dowling because he thinks he is taking the girls away from him. He was kicked out of his home and his relationship with his family is very strained. He is closer to Ronnie than Midge.
