= The Goblin Tower =

1968 novel by L. Sprague de Camp

- Cover of the first edition.
- Author: L. Sprague de Camp
- Cover artist: Jeff Jones
- Language: English
- Series: Novarian series
- Genre: Fantasy
- Publisher: Pyramid Books
- Publication date: December, 1968
- Publication place: United States
- Media type: Print (paperback)
- Pages: 253
- Preceded by: The Fallible Fiend
- Followed by: The Clocks of Iraz

The Goblin Tower is a fantasy novel by American writer L. Sprague de Camp, the first book of both his Novarian series and the "Reluctant King" trilogy featuring King Jorian of Xylar. It is not to be confused with the collection of poetry by the same title by Frank Belknap Long. De Camp's novel was first published as a paperback by Pyramid Books in 1968. It was reprinted by Del Rey Books in December 1983, July 1987, and July 1989. It was later gathered together with its sequels The Clocks of Iraz (1971) and The Unbeheaded King (1983) into the omnibus collection The Reluctant King (Nelson Doubleday/SFBC, February 1985). The first independent hardbound edition was issued by HarperCollins in 1987. An E-book edition was published by Gollancz's SF Gateway imprint on September 29, 2011, as part of a general release of de Camp's works in electronic form. The novel has been translated into French, Italian and German.

== Plot summary ==
The Kingdom of Xylar, one of the twelve city-states of Novaria, has a peculiar custom for choosing its kings, each of whom serves for a five-year term. At the end of that period he is beheaded in the public square before an assembly of foreigners, and his head cast into the crowd. The man who catches the head is drafted as the next king. The latest beneficiary/victim of this arrangement is Jorian of Kortoli, a powerful and intelligent man who has trained extensively for a life of adventure, but who is hampered by garrulousness and a weakness for drink and women. Having served out his term as king in a reign characterized by both great accomplishments and increasing despair, he ultimately appears resigned to his fate, though in fact he is determined to cheat it.

He successfully escapes his beheading with the aid of a Mulvanian magician, the saintly Dr. Karadur, who provides a spell granting physical access to the plane of the Novarian afterlife. This turns out to be our own world, in which the souls of Novarians are reincarnated. Jorian's brief excursion there is a satirical romp in which he is frightened by a passing giant truck, has a mutually uncomprehending encounter with a police officer in a patrol car, and is very glad to get back to the familiar dangers of his own world. These include an encounter with a homicidal wizard and his giant squirrel familiar, along with the succor of a distressed damsel who proves more trouble than she is worth.

Linking back up with Karadur, Jorian is confronted with the price of the sorcerer's aid; securing for him the Kist of Avlen, a legendary repository of ancient magical manuscripts. The novel follows his adventures as he attempts to both fulfill his service and avoid the agents of Xylar, duty-bound to abduct him back to Xylar for the beheading ceremony. Jorian's quest takes him through much of the known world, including the exotic lands of Mulvan, Komilakh and Shven, before ultimately returning to Novaria. Included in his adventures' bill of fare are the rescue a consignment of maidens destined for the block from a fortress full of homicidal retired executioners, romancing the centuries-old serpent princess Yargali guarding the Kist in order to steal it, matching wits with an unreliable and ineffectual god who appears to his worshipers in dreams, escaping sacrifice by a horde of angry beast men to their tiger god, enslavement and sale by treacherous nomads, and abetting a revolution in the priest-ruled city-state of Tarxia, during which a huge frog statue is brought to life.

The ultimate challenge comes at a great symposium of Karadur's guild of magicians hosted by the city-state of Metouro - the depiction of which provides de Camp with the opportunity to poke some fun at academic conferences and symposiums before getting on with the plot. The meeting is held in the fabled Goblin Tower, constructed from actual goblins transformed to stone. There Jorian becomes enmeshed in sorcerous politics as his patron Karadur naively presents the Kist of Avlen to the heads of his own faction, hoping thereby to advance its cause. Unfortunately, its use by these unscrupulous leaders cancels the spell binding the building's fabric together, freeing the goblins and bringing the tower crashing down. The protagonists escape but are left without resource. The outcome is particularly frustrating to Jorian; he had counted on Karadur's assistance in achieving his ultimate objective, the rescue from Xylar of Estrildis, his favorite among the wives he had as king, with whom he had hoped to settle down in peaceful obscurity in his home state of Kortoli.

The end of the novel finds him starting from scratch to recoup his fortunes by telling stories on a street corner.

The Goblin Tower by L. Sprague de Camp, Del Rey Books, 1983

== Setting ==
The world of which Novaria is part is a parallel world to Earth, a plane of existence related to ours in that ours constitutes its afterlife. Culturally it bears resemblances to the eras of both Classical Greece and Medieval Europe. The states of Novaria itself are split between competing systems of government, some of them unique, which allows the author to explore various pros and cons of different styles of governance as his hero tours the country.

== Innovative features ==
The Goblin Tower is one of de Camp's most innovative fantasies, and not only in its use of politics. It inverts the "rags to royalty" pattern characteristic of much heroic fantasy by featuring a protagonist fleeing an unwanted crown. Another singular feature of the novel is its frequent use of folk tales integrated into the plot (Jorian is a skilled storyteller) to painlessly convey something of the background and history of the invented world. This device obviates the need for lengthy appendices, as in The Lord of the Rings. While each book in the trilogy makes use of the device, its use is heaviest in The Goblin Tower.

== Relation to other works ==
The method of dragon hunting employed in the inset tale "King Fusinian the Fox and the Teeth of Grimnor" is echoed in the late de Camp novel The Pixilated Peeress (1991).

== Reception ==
Steven Tew, writing in Paperback Inferno #71, 1988, states that the novel is "[n]ot something I would give a second glance to on the shelves of W. H. Smith, but an enjoyable read nonetheless." He notes "I found the story entertaining, not least from the way in which de Camp injects humour into the tale. Instead of sublime Good v Evil struggles, the infighting of the wizards and the politics of the imaginary world are mirrors of the hypocrisy, double-dealing, and grey morality of our own world."

The book was also reviewed by Robert E. Toomey, Jr. in Science Fiction Review, June 1969, Paul Dale Anderson in SF Commentary #13, 1970, Pierre Merlin in Fiction #199, 1970, John Boardman in Amra v. 2, no. 56, June 1972, Robin Marcus in Paperback Parlour, April 1979, and Peter T. Garratt in Interzone #24, Summer 1988.

Preceded by The Fallible Fiend	Novarian series The Goblin Tower	Succeeded by The Clocks of Iraz
Preceded by None	The Reluctant King; The Goblin Tower	Succeeded by The Clocks of Iraz
