= Novarian series =

Sequence of stories by L. Sprague de Camp

The Reluctant King, Nelson Doubleday, 1985.

The Novarian series is a sequence of fantasy stories by L. Sprague de Camp, published between 1968 and 1989. The series contains some of de Camp's most innovative works of fantasy, featuring explorations of various political systems, an inversion of the "rags to royalty" pattern characteristic of much heroic fantasy, a satiric look at the foibles of humanity through the eyes of a demon, and a consistently wry and ironic take on conventions of the genre that plays out by taking them to their logical (or illogical) conclusions. Another singular feature of the series is its frequent use of folk tales integrated into the plot to painlessly convey something of the background and history of the invented world. This device obviates the need for lengthy appendices, as in The Lord of the Rings.

== The setting ==
=== The world ===
Novaria is portrayed as a region of a parallel world to Earth, a plane of existence related to ours in that ours constitutes its afterlife. This unique concept makes it a sort of reverse-Bangsian fantasy, or rather makes our world its Bangsian fantasy. Mankind shares this world with other intelligent beings, like the serpent people of Beraoti, the beast-men of Komilakh, the silvans of the mountain forests, and the mermen and mermaids in the sea. The fauna is largely that of Earth's Ice Age, while the vegetation is similar to that of present-day Earth.

In Novaria's world, the supernatural element is dominant. Magic works, though in a strictly logical fashion that often leaves its practitioners dissatisfied. Gods are real and strongly influence mortal affairs, communicating with their worshipers through dreams. Demons can, and often are, summoned from other planes of existence, which Novarians number in relation to their own (which to them is the Prime Plane).

=== The western continents ===
The two western continents where most of the series' events take place span the world's climatic zones from the arctic to the tropics. They are bounded by the Western Ocean to the west and the Eastern Ocean to the east.

The northernmost of these continents is largely desolate, consisting primarily of the steppe country of Shven, inhabited by nomads patterned after the Mongols, with the pirate isles of Algarth off its western coast and the land of Hroth in the north. It's joined to the southern continent at the southwest end by the broad isthmus of Novaria, but otherwise separated from it by the Mediterranean-like inland seas known as the Inner Sea and the Sea of Sikhon.

The more civilized southern continent contains, from west to east, the empire of Penembei, the desert of Fedirun, home to Beduin-like nomads, the tropical realm of Mulvan, and the jungles of Komilakh, inhabited by beast men. Other regions, notably Beraoti, lie further south of here. The principal powers are Penembei and Mulvan. Penembei is modeled after Sumerian Mesopotamia, Ptolemaic Egypt, and the Byzantine Empire; authority there is shared between a King and a High Priestess, with considerable influence also exercised by two mutually antagonistic sporting/political factions in the capital of Iraz, similar to those that tore Byzantium apart in the Nika riots. Mulvan is a caste-bound empire combining features of India, China, and Persia. In Novaria, there are small bands of wandering Mulvanians, who act as entertainers and fortune-tellers and who are plainly modeled on the Roma.

=== More distant lands ===
East of the western continents across the Eastern Ocean are the archipelagos known as the Peppercorns, Salimor, and Gwoling. The Salimor islands comprise a monarchy mingling elements of Japan and the Philippines - the ruling Sophi having very imperfect control over outlying islands, some of them inhabited by head-hunters or pirates. Beyond the islands is an eastern continent which contains the great empire of Kuromon, based on China and Japan, and another nomad-inhabited steppe belt. West of the western continents across the Western Ocean is the country of the cannibal Paaluan sea raiders, whose appearance resembles that of Australian Aborigines. Also, the Paaluan cavalry ride Kangaroos when in battle. Since the Paaluans are stated (in The Honorable Barbarian) to be a threat in the Eastern Ocean, there is evidently a navigable sea passage around either the main Novarian continent or the eastern continent, or both. The distant land of Yelizova, located far to the south of the Mulvanian jungles and from which daring Zolon mariners brought the giant squirrel used by Rhithos the Smith, might be located along that route. In the same general region seems to be Macrobia, the ĺand from which the Salimorese wizard Klung obtained qahwa, a drink which keeps sleepiness at bay - an exotic drink in Salimor and completely unknown in Novaria.

=== Novaria ===
Novaria itself, as noted above, is a broad isthmus joining the two continental masses to the north and south. (De Camp oddly yet consistently refers to it as a peninsula, though it is plainly an isthmus in both his maps and descriptions.) Novaria is separated from the northern continent by the high Ellorna Mountains and from the southern by the great Logram Mountains. On its other sides it drains into the Western Ocean and the Inner Sea, which communicates with the Eastern Ocean via the smaller Sea of Sikhon.

In ancient times, Novaria was divided into three kingdoms. This era was ended by an invasion by nomads of Shven, precipitating a Dark Age from which the present twelve city-states gradually coalesced. Among the earliest to emerge were Kortoli, Othomae, and Aussar. Finjanius, a reforming king of Kortoli, reigned just after the end of the Dark Age. The city-states were united only once in their history, by the conqueror Ardyman the Terrible of Govannion. Ardyman's chief legacy was Ir, the capital he built for his empire, a mostly subterranean city delved and carved out of living rock. But, after his death the realm fell apart and the cities regained their independence, with Ir becoming one more among them. In Kortoli, after it threw off Ardyman's yoke, ruled the legendary line of kings which included Fusas, Fusor, Forbonian, Forimar the Esthete, Fusonio, Filoman the Well-Meaning, and Fusinian the Fox.

Culturally, present-day Novaria bears resemblances to the eras of both Classical Greece and late Medieval Europe (Italy in particular), especially in conveying the vivid life of a cluster of city states sharing a common language and culture, though widely different in political regime and often at war with each other.

There are various references to other times and places: In the Novarian city states is a strong movement towards the abolition of slavery, which was common in Classical Greece but not Renaissance Italy; there is a reference to Doctor Truentious, the Vindium revolutionary, taking the tile "First Consul" which was historically Napoleon Bonaparte's title before he became Emperor; the reference in Metouro's history to a social reformer being assassinated by oligarchs and his cause taken up by his more radical brother recalls the Gracchi Brothers in the Roman Republic; the story of King Fusinian of Kortoli supposedly halting the tide refers to the well-known story of King Canute of England; references to "a really effective contraceptive spell" loosening public morals in Novaria clearly reflect the 20th Century contraceptive pill.

The twelve city-states into which Novaria is split are ruled under a wide variety of competing governmental systems, some of them unique. Several of these are visited and their contemporary situations shown during the progress of the stories; the general history of the region is recounted from a Kortolian perspective by Jorian, the series's main protagonist, in a number of folktales he relates in the course of his adventures. The Twelve Cities and their governments (as far as these were revealed) are as follows:

- Aussar - a despotate of the medieval Byzantine type
- Boaktis - a tyranny of the classical Greek type
- Govannion - a shogunate ruled by a "hereditary usurper"
- Ir - a republic ruled by a syndicate of plutocrats
- Kortoli - a hereditary monarchy with no nobles but the royal family
- Metouro - a republic ruled by a secret society
- Othomae - a grand duchy ruled by a civilian grand duke and a military "grand bastard"
- Solymbria - an archonate, with officials selected by random drawing
- Tarxia - a theocracy dedicated to a toad god deemed a minor deity in the rest of Novaria
- Vindium - a republic of the classical Roman type
- Xylar - a monarchy with kings chosen by lot and beheaded every five years
- Zolon - an island thalassocracy ruled by a High Admiral.

=== Other Planes ===
The Other Planes of Existence, accessible by magic, play an important part in the plot. Calling up the denizens of other planes, and demanding of them to perform various services, is an important part of magic. So, wizards are called upon to study their life, language, society, and habits. The inhabitants of various Planes are lumped together under the general and rather pejorative term "demons" - though there are very considerable differences between them, and at least some of them are quite civilized and sophisticated on their own terms. The Planes are numbered according to their order away from the Prime Plane - which is a term used by human wizards for their own plane. As noted by Zdim in the first paragraph of The Fallible Fiend, there is nothing objective about this designation, any Plane could term itself "Prime" and number the others accordingly. Some of the Planes get detailed descriptions, in particular, Zdim's Twelfth Plane - while others get only a brief mention.

- Our World ("First Plane" or "The Afterworld"). Our world is located directly "above" the Prime Plane, which would make it "The First Plane" - but this term is not used. Rather, it is called "The Afterworld", since the souls of deceased Prime Planers supposedly go to it for their next incarnation. That is why many people in our world often ask the advice of occultists and fortune tellers, even though they are charlatans with no real power - because we retain some vestiges of memory of an earlier incarnation in a world where such people had real, manifest power. "The Afterworld" is located some thirty of forty feet "above" the Prime Plane, though completely invisible and inaccessible except by the use of magic. There is a clear one-to-one correspondence between any point in the Prime Plane and the one "above" it in our world. Thus, walking a certain distance in a certain direction in our world would bring one to directly "above" a spot at the same distance and direction in the Prime Plane. Clearly, from the description in the beginning of The Goblin Tower, Novaria seems to be directly "under" some part of the United States. It seems logical (though never explicitly stated) that the other Planes are similarly laid out one "above" the other, so that in principle using a magic rope one could get into more faraway ones. In practice, however, wizards in general have no wish to themselves enter into any other Plane (which might be very dangerous) but rather to bring their denizens into the Prime Plane.
- Second Plane. Wizards and sorcerers regularly call up two distinct kinds of Second Plane denizens. One of them are entities which are easy to invoke, not intelligent but obedient to the sorcerer's commands like a well-trained dog. They appear in the Prime Plane as immaterial entities which cannot be harmed by material weapons. As such they are commonly used as "Dunning Specters" which are sent to appear at night in the bedroom of a recalcitrant debtor and croak all night: "Pay your debts! Pay your debts!" It's a mystery how, without having solid vocal organs, they can agitate the Prime Plane air to make such sounds. Another application of such entities are magic ropes, such as the one by which Jorian escaped execution in Xylar; such a rope is animated by a spirit from the Second Plane, captured and placed into the rope by a wizard (Karadur in this case). Similarly, when dealing with the assassin Malgo who tried to kill Jorian, the wizardess Goania used "a couple of minor spirits", inducing them to enter into lengths of rope which then moved like serpents and wrapped themselves securely around Malgo's ankles and wrists. While not explicitly stated, these seem to have been from the Second Plane. As explained by the wizard Klung in Salimor, the Second Plane spirits in such a rope eventually "leak out and decamp" and the rope needs to be "recharged" by inducing new Second Plane spirits into it. An entirely different kind of Second Planers are the tiny flying beings used as "guardian spirits" or "familiars" (hantu in Salimorese) of whom Belinka is the most well-known example. They resemble a large butterfly, but the pearly body supporting the glossy wings is not an insect's but rather a tiny naked human body, about the size of a normal human's palm. They are nearly translucent, appearing as a floating spot of bluish luminescence, and can also make themselves completely invisible if they choose. Their voices sound like tinkling bells, though it is unclear whether they actually speak or communicate mentally. Since they do not completely materialize on the Prime Plane, they cannot be harmed by humans who "hate bugs". But they are material enough to administer painful stings to humans. They resemble humans not only in the shape of their tiny bodies but also mentally, being capable of both profound thinking and deep emotion, with their love life carried on "on the wing". While the evoked denizens of other Planes only carry out a sorcerer's precise instructions, which they often tend to misunderstand, the Second Plane tiny flying beings need only to be given a general mission and would make their own intelligent decisions on how to implement it, showing much ingenuity and some deceit (as when Belinka tried to mislead Kerin in order to get Nogiri killed). Belinka manifested a strong sense of duty and devotion to her double mission - preserving Kerin's physical safety and keeping him chaste and faithful to Adeliza, the wayward girl he left behind. Kerin suspected that some of Belinka's outbursts of strong jealousy were her own emotions as well as dutiful acts on Adeliza's behalf. When faced with failure, Kerin having married Nogiri and consummated that marriage, Belinka expressed despair and stated that, were she on her own plane, she would have immolated herself in a volcano - though she later found consolation in starting a relationship with Sendu, a male of her own kind. It's unclear if such a strong sense of duty was Belinka's personal character trait or typical of all her species. And there is no information on the relationship, while on their native Plane, between Belinka's kind and the non-intelligent, rope-animating spirits. Gambling houses in Salimor sometimes employ Second Plane "familiars" to prevent the use of magic by dishonest gamblers. Their use in courts as "lie detectors" was proposed, since they are skilled in reading human facial expressions - but the idea was dropped due to strong opposition by lawyers.
- Third Plane. A wizard named Coel was said to have sold his soul into a thousand years' bondage on the Third Plane, in return for a transformation spell which enabled him to disguise himself as a vulture.
- Fourth Plane. Rhithos the Smith brought the spirit of a minor demon from the Fourth Plane to inhabit the body of his familiar, the giant squirrel Ixus. The demon seemed fairly intelligent and able to help Rhithos in the complicated physical and magical operations of sword-making, and was loyal to him during the smith's life and death struggle with Jorian. At the wizards' costume party, the apprentice Teleinos of Tarxia dressed like a demon from the Fourth Plane (no description given). The wizard Klung in Salimor found a way to harness a different set of entities on the Fourth Plane. He described them as "Not exactly spirits, albeit sentient non-material organisms". They are not very intelligent and cannot manifest themselves on the Prime Plane. However, Klung's machine made it possible in allowing these beings to seize a person from one location on the Prime Plane and transport him or her instantaneously, via the Fourth Plane, to another location on the Prime Plane. Though still in the experimental stage, with the person transported being naked and no material objects being taken along, this use of the Fourth Plane saved Kerin and Nogiri in a critical situation while enabling them to travel instantaneously from Salimor to Novaria.
- Fifth Plane. Unlike the summoning of Twelfth Plane inhabitants which is regulated by agreement with that Plane's government and involving payment given for the service, summoning from the Fifth Plane is a unilateral act of brute force by the Prime Plane sorcerers. The Fifth Plane "demon" is called up by magic at night, kept imprisoned in a pentagram, and threatened with being kept there until daylight - a dire threat since Fifth Planers are allergic to the radiation from the Prime Plane's sun. Thus they have no choice but submitting and swearing a binding oath to do whatever the sorcerer demands. As evident in the case of a Fifth Planer named Ruakh, summoned by Abacarus as part of Jorian's effort to regain his wife, Estrildis, Fifth Planers - who have long since abolished slavery on their own Plane - deeply resent this practice, which amounts to kidnapping and extortion of forced labor. Also, the Fifth Planer Uqful, sent by the sorcerer Pwana to kidnap Nogiri, complained bitterly of "Prime Planers snatching us from our native planes and forcing us to serve without pay. Ye compel us to commit deeds we would never dream of on our own planes". Fifth Plane "demons" thus have some grounds to consider themselves as the civilized ones and regard the Prime Planers as savages and barbarians. The only recourse they have is the stipulation that after performing the task required, this individual "demon" is excused and may not be called again for some years. Fifth Planers have been talking for some time about organizing all "demons" to stop Prime Plane exploitation but so far little came of it; luckily for the Prime Plane sorcerers, there doesn't exist on the Fifth Plane a magic advanced enough to reverse the process and call up the sorcerers in order to exact retribution on them. A Fifth Planer is a being of human size and shape, but on its back is a huge pair of batlike wings and its clawed feet resemble those of a huge bird of prey. Its skin resembles a skintight suit of scarlet silk. There are no permanent organs of reproduction - rather, Fifth Planers grow them at the proper season and shed them off afterwards, and are neuter for most of their lives. They have tough skins not easily penetrated by a sword, but are not completely invulnerable; Kerin, in fighting the aforementioned Uqful in order to save Nogiri, found several weak spots in the Fifth Planer's body, particularly to thrust a blade into its open mouth. Fifth Planers have the power to dematerialize and reappear anywhere, instantaneously. However, they can only dematerialize their own bodies. To carry any person or object from place to place, they rely on their powerful wings. Typically, a Fifth Planer is summoned for a single night, set a task which can be carried out in short order, and is dismissed before sunrise. Otherwise, the Fifth Planer must be kept in complete darkness during the day and protected from sunlight. An exception was discovered by a powerful Salimorese wizard named Pwana, who found a way to protect Fifth Planers from the Prime Plane sun - using a whole bunch of them, riding elephants in daylight, during his effort to destroy Kerin and Nogiri. Lacking Pwana's secret, other wizards resorted to summoning the spirits of Fifth Planers without involving their physical bodies, in which case they are not vulnerable to the Prime Plane's sun. The powerful Fifth Planer Gorax was summoned in this way, spending years on the Prime Plane with his spirit imprisoned in a ring and bound not for a fixed period of time but for a specific number of tasks. He was first captured by Valdonius of Tarxia who then gave him over to Karadur. Gorax proved, all by himself, more than a match for hundreds of Goblins from the Ninth Plane on whom Karadur had set him. Later, Gorax carried Jorian and Karadur by air in a copper bathtub, all the way from Penembei back to Novaria - and not having his vulnerable physical body with him, Gorax had no trouble keeping them in the air both night and day. At an earlier time, King Filoman the Well-Meaning of Kortoli and his foe Doctor Truentious, First Consul of Vindium, both used in their war with each other Golem generals - a clay figure inhabited and animated by the spirit of a Fifth Planer. As the animating spirits of such clay figures, the Fifth Planers proved competent generals, even if not brilliant, well familiar with human armies' tactics and strategy; in that manifestation, however, they displayed none of their "demonic" powers. When working at the House of Learning in Iraz (and hoping to become eventually its director), Karadur was set the task of compiling a dictionary of the language of the Demons of the Fifth Plane - possibly aided by the fact that he had Gorax in his ring and could mentally communicate with him on linguistic issues. When called up, Fifth Planers are able to fluently speak Novarian (and presumably also other human tongues). However, the binding oath required of the captured Fifth Planer is in his own language. The sorcerer has to be able to follow it and make sure of not being tricked - since setting the powerful captive free of the pentagram without his having made the real oath could have fatal consequences. The wizard Arkanius, who used to travel with Bagadro's Circus, was killed by a being which he tried to evoke and failed to take the proper precautions with. Members of the circus, finding Arkanius gone and only blood stains left, didn't know or care from which Plane came the being who did it. It might have been one of the Fifth Planers, who so strongly resent being evoked - especially that it happened at night, the normal time for evoking Fifth Planers.
- Sixth Plane. Inhabitants of the Sixth Plane are aerial demons in the form of bat-winged lizard men, very fearsome to look at. To invoke them requires "a spell of the utmost difficulty and danger" which involves human sacrifice. Performing this spell causes the Earth to tremble, the Moon to turn a blood red, and the forests to be filled with eerie wailing. However, invoking them is not always worth all the effort. Unlike the inhabitants of other Planes, who can be called upon in spirit, Sixth Planers can only be summoned in the flesh - making them vulnerable to aggressive opponents. One such case is when King Fusinian of Kortoli tried summoning a Sixth Planer army (after finding a volunteer for the human sacrifice part) in order to rid his kingdom of the a tribe of giants, known as The Teeth of Grimnor, who had taken over Kortoli. However, these aerial demons were easy prey for the giants, who simply seized the flying creatures and tore them to pieces. The survivors fled back to Sixth Plane and for a long time refused to be invoked at all. Centuries later, the assorted robbers and rebels besieging Iraz tried it again - but with no more of a success. The city's magical defenders called upon all the bees, wasps, and hornets within ten miles, and these converged on the Sixth Plane demons, repeatedly and painfully stinging them - causing them, once again, to flee back to their own Plane.
- Seventh Plane. Seventh Plane inhabitants are fiery beings whose very touch could set any object on fire. Also, their blast of fiery breath can incinerate a human being within seconds. They are not very intelligent and summoning them can be very dangerous for a young inexperienced sorcerer. Uriano, who was the lover of the wizardess Goania in her youth, made the fatal mistake of summoning one of them, named Vrix - and was incinerated when the demon took his orders too literally. In later life, there was a small Seventh Plane demon who was madly in love with Goania and ready to do whatever she asked. She was careful not to consummate this relationship, as it might have gotten her burnt to a crisp, but found it useful to intimidate enemies by threatening to loose the ardent, fiery Seventh Planer onto them.
- Eighth Plane. At the Wizards' Conclave, Bhulla of Janareth delivered a rather boring lecture on "Familial Organization and Kinship Nomenclature amongst Demons of the Eighth Plane." In their natural appearance, an Eighth Planer has a humanoid shape with a smooth brownish surface. However, an Eighth Planer could be made into a "doublegoer" - i.e. to take on the appearance of a specific human being and speak in that individual's voice. Many hours of careful preparation are needed, with the Eighth Planer standing in the pentagram and the human being serving as a model standing in front, before the impersonation is complete to the smallest detail. Then the Eighth Planer needs to be carefully coached in what "he" or "she" is expected to say or do. Eighth Planers could be relied on to faithfully carry out such instructions and implement the desired deception, but cannot be expected to use any judgement or respond to unexpected developments. If the Eighth Planer is eventually unmasked, no harm will come to it. Inimical people will discover it to be immaterial, impervious to weapons, and will soon dissolve in smoke before returning to the Eighth Plane.
- Ninth Plane. Its inhabitants, known popularly as "Goblins" are five feet tall and spindle-legged, with an enormous head, larger than a pumpkin, and a huge, froglike gash of a mouth. The populist leader, Charenzo of Metouro, introduced hundreds of them to unleash a Reign of Terror against his Oligarch foes. The Goblins are nocturnal and were rarely seen during the day - but at night, the citizens of Metouro cowered behind locked doors, fearing that "one of these bouncing, big headed creatures" drag them towards a "nameless doom". To get rid of Charenzo, the Faceless Five unleashed a spell which turned the Goblins into stone. These "stones" were later used in constructing a tower which became known as "the Goblin Tower". Centuries later, the wizard Vorko of Hendau, seeking to rid himself of his magical opponents, inadvertently nullified the spell and brought the petrified goblins back to life, causing the tower to collapse. The revived Goblins, far from being aggressive, seemed frightened and were easily chased back to their own plane by a Fifth Plane demon named Gorax, set on them by Karadur.
- Tenth Plane. In the Iraz House of Learning, some sages were trying to train a demon from the Tenth Plane, a creature of low intelligence, to obey simple commands.
- Twelfth Plane. First introduced in The Goblin Tower where the wizard Vorko of Hendau had two demons from the Twelfth Plane, Zoth and Frig, bound to his service for nine years. Far more information is given in The Fallible Fiend, which is a first-person narrative told by Zdim, himself a "Twelfth Plane demon". They are cold-blooded reptiles having a human size and shape, but having scales, tails, muzzles, fangs, talons, pointed ears, and mustaches consisting of a pair of fleshy tendrils, which constantly curl and uncurl or wave about "like the tentacles of a small squid". These tendrils give Twelfth Planers the ability to "read" human emotions. vibrations in the tendrils tell if a human is feeling hatred, lust, bewilderment, and if they intend deceit or are sincerity which among other things helped Zdim avoid being cheated at a human card game to which he was introduced. Such vibrations also alert Twelfth Planers to magic being used. Their large yellow eyes have slit pupils and have excellent night vision, considering humans to be "half-blind at night." Their normal color is slate-grey but they can change color at will, for example to utter black, to be inconspicuous at night, or to green among vegetation. They might also change color involuntarily when exited or embarrassed - akin to human blushing. They are able to remain truly motionless, without any moving or fidgeting. When doing this, their presence goes almost unnoticed, leading to the mistaken idea that they can make themselves invisible. They are immune to nearly all Prime Plane diseases. In fact, they are quite peaceful and mild creatures by themselves and in their own world. Their society is peaceful and well-ordered, and they regard the Prime Plane institution of war as barbaric and have no wish to emulate it. They have much less laws and law-enforcement officials than on the Prime Plane. This Zdim attributed partly to the fact that "on the Twelfth Plane, a demon properly reared by his parents adheres to decent behavior thereafter without constant compulsion" and partly to a powerful spell developed by Twelfth Plane wizards which compels anyone accused of a crime to tell the exact truth - which makes it easier to deal with the limited number of demons who do misbehave. This spell was evidently never shared with human wizards (or it might not work on humans) but the Salimorese wizard Klung got from a Twelfth Planer a spell making people fail to notice the user - thus achieving the result of invisibility without the inconvenience that a full-fledged invisibility cap requires one to go naked. Twelfth Plane beasts of burden are slow-moving, similar to giant tortoises, which plod sedately along, and Twelfth Planers feel no need for faster ones. Like humans, Twelfth Planers consider fishing as a relaxation and occasionally take fishing holidays. When visiting the Marshes of Kshak, where Zdim went as boy to hunt flitflowers, Twelfth Planers must be wary of fearsome dragons living there. When drafted to the Prime Plane, Zdim was studying with a philosopher named Khrum and had read books on the history of Prime Plane countries or the biographies of their prominent citizens (which didn't prevent him from often misunderstanding the nuances of Prime Plane cultures). He was in fact better trained in reason and logic, than in the fast action required of him in the Prime Plane. While having an extensive number of books on such subjects as philosophy, history, science, and magic, Twelfth Planers publish no fiction whatsoever. Zdim, having developed an interest in such fantastic literature while on the Prime Plane, was considered very strange by his fellow demons. Already in his boyhood, Zdim studied Novarian at his school. This was evidently included in the curriculum in anticipation of pupils' future service on the Prime Plane (it was a very literary version of Novarian, while Zdim had to pick up the vulgarisms by himself). It's possible that Ning, Zdim's home region on the Twelfth Plane, specializes in providing indentured service in Novaria; Twelfth Plane demons who are mentioned as serving members of the Navigators' Guild in Salimor during Guild meetings might have originated from another region on the Fifth Plane, where Salimorese is taught in the schools. The male organ of Twelfth Planers is retracted inside the body when not in use - such use occurring only during specific seasons. It has spiny barbs, which females of the species like but are frightening to human females which happen to see it. Twelfth Planers enjoy sex at its proper time but are not obsessed by thoughts of sex, and are baffled by human males' habit of boasting sexual prowess. They practice monogamous marriage, the female laying a clutch of eggs and both spouses sharing in guarding the eggs and caring for the offspring when they emerge - though males tend to consider cooking and cleaning as "female work." The population of a Twelfth Plane kingdom includes a number of unattached females, who are often employed as domestic servants. Peaceful as they are, however, the appearance of Twelfth Planers can be frightening to Prime Plane humans, and they are much stronger than humans and have much tougher skins. When bound to the service of a human, they might use violence when ordered to (or when misinterpreting an order, which happens often). They consume the flesh of other creatures, preferably cooked (Zdim is mentioned as having broiled wild fluttersnake over a campfire when on a hunting trip) or, at need, raw. When making a big effort such as running a whole day without stopping, Twelfth Planers eventually need to eat a lot, for example a whole sheep and then go into a day-long digestive stupor. But they can also subsist on an entirely vegetarian diet, if forced to by circumstances or choosing out of moral principle. Already since the time of Wonk the Reformer, Twelfth Planers were strictly forbidden to devour fellow beings. Zdim was troubled by whether in having obeyed an order to kill and devour (raw) a Prime Planer, he had violated Wong's precepts, but put the blame on the wizard Maldivious who had given him the order. In a later case, when the famished Zdim accidentally killed a human, he found a philosophical rationale for eating him ("He no longer needs his body, and I certainly do"). As explained in the beginning of The Fallible Fiend, there is an agreement between "The Forces of Progress", (association of human wizards) and the government of the Twelfth Plane, regulating the terms of their indenture on the Prime Plane. Since the Twelfth Plane is iron-poor, its government provides the year-long indentured services of one of its people in return for a hundred-pound iron ingot. A rising standard of living on the Twelfth Plane requires increasing amounts of iron - proportionally increasing the need for Twelfth Planers to take up terms of service on the Prime Plane. The Twelfth Plane is divided into regions such as Zdim's native Ning. Each region is presided over by a Provost having wide authority, who is subject to a central government whose nature is not specified. It's the Provost who organizes in the region a draft of individual citizens who are required by law to perform service on the Prime Plane as a civic duty. The normal term of service is one year, during which the human "master" may sell or otherwise transfer the indentured Twelfth Planer to another human; when complaining of this, Zdim was told "Take it up with your own Provost". Indentured Twelfth Planers are provided by their government with a "Decamping Spell" which can bring them back home, to be used only in extreme cases of life danger. Frivolous use of this spell is punished by being sent back for a much longer term of indenture. The two Twelfth Planers described as owing nine years' service in the above case of Vorko of Hendau might have committed such a discretion. Zdim's exclamation when shocked, "Gods of Ning!" seems to indicate that each region has its own local pantheon of gods.
- A demon of unclear origin. As told by the ghost of Baron Lorc to Jorian and his companions, the Baron was the victim of fraud by Aurelion - a man who did have some true power as a wizard or sorcerer, but who falsely claimed to be an alchemist able to turn lead into gold. His method of fraud included invoking a demon by complicated rituals to supposedly help him transform a large amount of lead into gold. However, Lorc detected the fraud: the lead only seemed to have become gold and resumed its true shape when touched by Lorc's knife. Aurelion soon tried to put the blame on the demon, who answered "I did but follow thy commands, as I have done many times before! It is not my fault that this mortal detected thy cozening before we had won clear." Sharp altercations between Aurelion and the demon followed, concluded with said demon disappearing in a flash and loud explosion. Lorc then had Aurelion whipped and expelled from his castle. However, the sorcerer cursed Lorc to remain a restless ghost after his death. It's not specified from which Plane this demon originated.
- The Forty-Nine Mulvanian Hells. The program of the Wizards' Conclave included an experiment of evoking a fiend from the Thirty-Third Mulvanian hell. Intended spectators were warmed that this might be dangerous. In fact, the conclave was interrupted before this experiment could occur. It is unclear how or if the Mulvanian Hells relate to the numbered Planes.

== The stories ==
The series incidentally explores various pros and cons of different modes of governance as the action moves through Novaria and various other countries. Most of the stories have satirical themes – e.g., of academic conferences (the magicians' conclave, which ends The Goblin Tower), monotheistic religion (the toad-god Gorgolor, a minor deity in other places, but the supreme god of the universe in theocratic Tarxia), and modern poetry (Jorian's tale of a king in his native Kortoli refusing to grant an award to a poem composed of randomly chosen words).

The core of the Novarian series is the "Reluctant King" trilogy, consisting of The Goblin Tower (1968), The Clocks of Iraz (1971), and The Unbeheaded King (1983), all collected as The Reluctant King (1985). The trilogy is the story of Jorian, a native of Kortoli chosen by a gruesome lottery to become the king of Xylar (he caught the head of Xylar's previous monarch as it was thrown into a crowd). As the date of his own beheading approaches, he decided to escape from Xylar and its fatal crown, following his plan to recover his true love before settling down into obscurity for the ideal life as a simple craftsman. During his quest he travels across all of the known world, rescues a consignment of maidens destined for the executioner's block, romances a serpent princess, steals a chest of ancient spells, matches wits with gods, escapes being sacrificed by beast men, avoids being sold into slavery by nomads, joins a revolution in a priest-ruled city, becomes embroiled in the sorcerous politics of a magicians' guild, repairs the clocks in a famous lighthouse, saves a besieged city from four enemy hosts at once, braves a perilous flight in a demon-powered bathtub, negotiates with an unreliable magician, spirits a woman away from the city that has sworn to kill him, and exorcises the ghost of a cursed baron. Early on, there is also a short excursion into our world, in which Jorian is frightened by a passing giant truck, has a mutually uncomprehending encounter with a police officer in a patrol car, and is very glad to get back to the familiar dangers of his own world.

Two other tales are set earlier in Novaria's history; "The Emperor's Fan," which illustrates the perils of a magical artifact, and The Fallible Fiend, a satire told from the point of view of a demon named Zdim, who is condemned to service in the perplexing world of humans. A final story, The Honorable Barbarian, is a sequel to the Jorian sequence, relating the adventures of his younger brother Kerin in the far east.

There are also a number of stories within stories that present the background of the imagined world, primarily folktales told by Jorian of former kings of his home city-state of Kortoli. The most prominent of these are the culture addict King Forimar the Esthete, the foolish King Filoman the Well-Meaning, and the crafty hero King Fusinian the Fox, each of whom is the subject of a number of tales; three other kings receive one story each. Other internal tales consist of capsule autobiographies related by a number of the characters, notably Jorian himself, the serpent princess Yargali, the sorceress Goania, and the ghost baron Lorc. A third class of internal tale relates, usually in response to questions by Jorian, the histories of various places and objects of interest, such as the lost city of Culbagarh in Komilakh, the Goblin Tower in Othomae, the Tower of Kumashar in Iraz, the bathtub of Emperor Ishbahar of Penembei, and the toad god Gorgolor of Tarxia. This last is of interest in that it is told both as a direct experience of Jorian in The Goblin Tower and as an inset tale with Jorian's involvement edited out related by Kerin in The Honorable Barbarian.

According to de Camp's friend and fellow writer Darrell Schweitzer, De Camp wrote one additional Novarian novel, with "a quasi-Polynesian setting," under the working title of The Sedulous Sprite. It was reportedly de Camp's last novel, representing a noticeable falling-off in quality from his better work, and was considered unpublishable. The first page of the manuscript, which has been shared online by Schweitzer, indicates it to be a first-person narrative by a non-human protagonist like The Fallible Fiend, in this instance Belinka, the duty-obsessed fairy and major supporting character from The Honorable Barbarian (to which it serves as a sequel).

== Bibliography ==
=== The stories ===
In order of internal chronology:

1. "The Emperor's Fan" (1973)
2. The Fallible Fiend (1973)
3. The Goblin Tower (1968), ISBN 0-345-32812-4
4. The Clocks of Iraz (1971)
5. The Unbeheaded King (1983), ISBN 0-345-30773-9
6. The Honorable Barbarian (1989), ISBN 0-345-36091-5
7. The Sedulous Sprite (unpublished)

=== Inset tales ===
==== On the kings of Kortoli ====
All narrated by Jorian. Listed in order of internal chronology.

1. "King Finjanius and the Priests of Zevatas" (in The Clocks of Iraz)
2. "King Fusas and the Great Wrastle" (in The Goblin Tower)
3. "King Forbonian and the Water Wife" (in The Unbeheaded King)
4. "King Forimar the Esthete and Doubri the Faultless" (in The Goblin Tower)
5. "King Forimar the Esthete and the Waxen Wife" (in The Goblin Tower (fragment) and The Clocks of Iraz (full version))
6. "King Forimar the Esthete and the Sophi's Tower" (in The Unbeheaded King (full version) and The Honorable Barbarian (summary))
7. "King Filoman the Well-Meaning and the Golem General" (in The Clocks of Iraz)
8. "King Filoman the Well-Meaning and the Ghost Minister" (in The Goblin Tower)
9. "King Filoman the Well-Meaning and the Mulvanian Saint" (in The Goblin Tower)
10. "King Fusinian the Fox and the Teeth of Grimnor" (in The Goblin Tower)
11. "King Fusinian the Fox and the Boar of Chinioc" (in The Unbeheaded King)
12. "King Fusinian the Fox and the Tides" (in The Clocks of Iraz)
13. "King Fusinian the Fox and the Marvelous Caverns" (in The Goblin Tower)
14. "King Fusinian the Fox and the Enchanted Shovel" (in The Goblin Tower (fragment))
15. "Prince Fusarius and the Lonesome Lion" (in The Goblin Tower (fragment))

==== Other historical tales ====
Various narrators, as shown. Listed in order of internal chronology.

1. "The Myth of Vaisus and the Clockwork Man" (told by Jorian) (in The Goblin Tower (fragment))
2. "The Legend of Prince Wangerr of Gwoling and the Dragon of Banshou Island" (told by Doctor Ajendra) (in "The Emperor's Fan" (fragment)) and (told by Hiei) (in The Honorable Barbarian) (fragment))
3. "The History of Culbagarh" (told by Doctor Karadur) (in The Goblin Tower)
4. "The Tale of the Goblin Tower" (told by Doctor Vorko) (in The Goblin Tower)
5. "The Tale of the Tower of Kumashar" (told by Zerlik of Iraz) (in The Clocks of Iraz)
6. "The Legend of Captain Oswic's Ghost (told by Turonus the Taverner) (in The Unbeheaded King)
7. "The Tale of Emperor Ishbahar's Bathtub (told by Jorian) (in The Unbeheaded King)
8. "The Tale of the Toad God of Tarxia (told by Kerin) (in The Honorable Barbarian)

==== Personal anecdotes ====
Various narrators, as shown. Listed in order of internal chronology.

1. "Reminisces of Yargali" (told by the Serpent Princess Yargali) (in The Goblin Tower)
2. "Baron Lorc and the Curse of Gwitardus" (told by Baron Lorc) (in The Unbeheaded King)
3. "Goania and her Suitor" (told by the Wizardess Goania) (in The Unbeheaded King)
4. "The Youth and Reign of King Jorian of Xylar" (told by Jorian) (in The Goblin Tower)
5. "Jorian and the Slave Girls" (told by Jorian) (in The Unbeheaded King)
6. "The Exile of Balimpwang Pwana" (told by Pwana) (in The Honorable Barbarian)

=== Collected editions ===
- The Reluctant King (1985) (includes The Goblin Tower, The Clocks of Iraz and The Unbeheaded King)
