= The Emperor's Fan =

- Short story by L. Sprague de Camp
- Cover art from first paperback edition of The Best of L. Sprague de Camp (Ballantine Books, 1978), showing a scene from "The Emperor's Fan"
- Country: United States
- Language: English
- Genre: Fantasy

Publication
- Published in: Astounding: The John W. Campbell Memorial Anthology
- Media type: Print (hardback)
- Publication date: 1973

Chronology
- Series: Novarian series
—	The Fallible Fiend

"The Emperor's Fan" is a fantasy short story by American writer L. Sprague de Camp, the fourth of his Novarian series. It was first published in Astounding: The John W. Campbell Memorial Anthology, edited by Harry Harrison, in 1973. It has since been reprinted in other anthologies, including The Year's Best Fantasy Stories, edited by Lin Carter (1975), as well as such collections of de Camp's work as The Best of L. Sprague de Camp (1978) and Footprints on Sand (1981). It has also been translated into German.

== Plot summary ==
Tsotuga the Fourth, emperor of Kuromon, is a competent but dull ruler, notable only for occasional temperamental outbursts. Having poisoned his father to attain the throne, he finds his dreams haunted by his father's spirit, who prophecies a dreadful doom for him. Seeking some impregnable magical defense, Tsotuga is heartened when his crony, Reiro the Beggar, tells him that just such a weapon is said to be in the possession of the sorcerer Ajandra, from the tropical empire of Mulvan.

Tsotuga receives Ajandra, who produces a large painted fan, created centuries before for the king of the Gwoling Islands. Anything at which the fan is waved vanishes, and can only be recalled by tapping the fan in a particular pattern. The list of patterns is contained in a code book Ajandra also possesses. As an instance of the fan's power, the sorcerer relates how Prince Wangerr, grandson of the king for whom it was made, had once even fanned away a dragon he had encountered. After seeing the fan's powers demonstrated, Tsotuga purchases the fan and its code book.

For a month all is well; then the emperor is irked by his finance minister, Yaebu, and fans him away. He instantly regrets the action, but cannot bring the minister back, as he had hidden the code book and cannot remember where. The missing book is searched for, but fruitlessly. Spring advances, and Tsotuga becomes irritated with Chingitu, the minister of war, and Dzakusan, the prime minister, each of whom also suffers Yaebu's fate. He is now running short of functionaries, and the government suffers. Therefore, on the advice of his wife the empress Nasako, Tsotuga appoints as his new prime minister Zamben of Jompei, Supervisor of Roads and Bridges for Jade Mountain Province. Unbeknownst to him, Zamben is also the empress's secret lover.

Zamben proves an able administrator and so ingratiates himself with the emperor that he even ousts Reiro the Beggar from his position as the emperor's crony. Canny as well as ambitious, he manages through a stratagem to switch Tsotuga's fan for a duplicate. When the testy monarch eventually loses his temper with him as he had with his previous ministers and tries to fan him away, Zamben produces the true fan and dispatches the tyrant with his own weapon. To allay suspicion, he and Nasako give out that the vanished ruler had absent-mindedly fanned himself. The two subsequently wed, making Zamben imperial consort and regent to the fourteen-year-old Prince Wakumba, in effect emperor himself in all but name.

Zamben tries to reconstruct the fan's lost code book by trial and error, testing various combinations of taps with the fan and noting what he gets each time. A succession of past victims are restored thus, among them Yaebu — and the dragon once fanned away by Wangerr of Gwoling! The dragon promptly eats Zamben, fan and all, and bursts from the palace.

In the aftermath of this tragedy, Yaebu and Nasako become co-regents for Prince Wakumba. The missing code book finally turns up when the prince is crowned the new emperor — it was in a secret compartment in the crown of state. But without the fan it is useless. Court wizard Koxima is commissioned to create a replacement fan but is unsuccessful. The code book is consigned to the imperial archives as a curiosity, and the weapon's remaining victims are doomed to languish in limbo.

Chronologically, "The Emperor's Fan" is the earliest story in the Novarian series, being set centuries before the others. It also drives part of the plot of the final volume, The Honorable Barbarian, in which the fan is at last recreated and a later emperor accidentally consigned to the fan's limbo. The attempt to restore that emperor brings back Tsotuga instead, resulting in him regaining the throne of Kuromon after an absence of two hundred years.

== Setting ==
"The Emperor's Fan" does not take place in Novaria itself, but the eastern empire of Kuromon, another country in the same world. Kuromon is on a different continent, separated from that in which Novaria and Mulvan are found by the Eastern Ocean and the Gwoling Islands. De Camp patterned the empire after China and Japan. Kuromon is revisited in the final book in the Novarian series, The Honorable Barbarian, in which the magical fan is finally recreated. The world of which Novaria and Kuromon are part is a parallel world to Earth, a plane of existence related to ours in that ours constitutes its afterlife. Culturally it bears resemblances to our Classical and Medieval eras.

== Reception ==
David Bratman, in Mythprint, writes that he "treasure[s]" "The Emperor's Fan" as one of "a few gems" among its author's later fiction, calling "[t]he fan in question ... one of de Camp's cleverest inventions." Of de Camp's later work in general, Bratman notes "[t]he best shows even more incisive humor and ornate imagination than his earlier work, and it's blessedly free of pulpy writing." He praises de Camp's "elegant, lapidary style that retained the virtues of clarity, and the skill of his plotting disguises any sketchiness in characterization."

Preceded by none	Novarian series "The Emperor's Fan"	Succeeded by The Fallible Fiend
