= A Time for Judas =

1983 novel by Morley Callaghan

- Author: Morley Callaghan
- Cover artist: Brant Cowie
- Language: English
- Genre: Novel
- Publisher: Macmillan of Canada
- Publication date: September 1983
- Publication place: Canada
- Media type: Print (Hardback & Paperback)
- Pages: 247 pp
- ISBN: 0-7715-9772-X (hardback edition) & ISBN 0-312-80513-6 (paperback edition)
- OCLC: 10211755
- Dewey Decimal: 813/.52 19
- LC Class: PR9199.3.C27 T55 1983
- Preceded by: No Man's Meat and the Enchanted Pimp
- Followed by: Our Lady of the Snows

A Time for Judas is a historiographic metafiction novel by Canadian author Morley Callaghan, published by Macmillan of Canada in 1983.

The novel tells the story of a man in modern times who discovers tablets written by a scribe named Philo of Crete or Philo the Greek. In the story, these tablets are from the time of Jesus and are Philo's telling of Jesus' last days and the aftermath, including his resurrection. This modern-day man writes a novel based on these tablets. The bulk of the real novel is the fictional novel, i.e. a retelling of sorts of Philo's story.

The story is similar to that presented in the Gospel of Judas, a Gnostic gospel that surfaced around the time of the book's publication.

== Plot introduction ==
The title refers to the friendship between the scribe, Philo, and Judas Iscariot, the disciple who betrayed Jesus. The premise is that Judas was actually Jesus' most trusted disciple, and chose him for the important job of "betraying" him to the authorities. In other words, Judas was following Jesus' instructions. He tells his story to Philo, who writes it all down on papyrus, seals it up in a Greek jar, and hides it until it is discovered in the 20th century. The story goes that Judas hanged himself, not because he was ashamed of betraying Jesus, but because he had not kept the secret as Jesus had made him promise to do.
