= Harold Lloyd: The Man on the Clock =

1983 book by Tom Dardis

- First edition
- Author: Tom Dardis
- Language: English
- Publisher: Viking Press
- Publication date: August 1, 1983
- Publication place: United States
- Pages: 357
- ISBN: 9780670452279

Harold Lloyd: The Man on the Clock is a 1983 book by the American writer Tom Dardis, about the life and works of the comedic actor Harold Lloyd. The title alludes to the 1923 film Safety Last! in which Lloyd appears to be suspended from a clock face.

== Reception ==
Robert Goff of The New York Review of Books wrote that "Dardis devotedly chronicles Lloyd's life and films. ... The result is pleasantly peripheral, showing little comprehension of the uniqueness of Lloyd’s art. Indeed; the book treats Lloyd’s career as if it were a talkie, that is, as if plot and ambition made all the difference." Kirkus Reviews wrote: "Dardis (Keaton) tries hard to find material for a full-fledged Harold Lloyd biography here ... but this short book (to be filled out with 136 black-and-white photos) remains light on life-story, heavy on routine film-by-film rundowns."
