= The Unbeheaded King =

Book by Lyon Sprague de Camp

- first edition of The Unbeheaded King
- Author: L. Sprague de Camp
- Cover artist: Darrell K. Sweet
- Language: English
- Series: Novarian series
- Genre: Fantasy
- Publisher: Del Rey Books
- Publication date: 1983
- Publication place: United States
- Media type: Print (hardback)
- Pages: 185
- ISBN: 0-345-30773-9
- OCLC: 8805991
- Dewey Decimal: 813/.52 19
- LC Class: PS3507.E2344 U5 1983
- Preceded by: The Clocks of Iraz
- Followed by: The Honorable Barbarian

The Unbeheaded King is a fantasy novel by American writer L. Sprague de Camp, the fourth book of his Novarian series and the third in the "Reluctant King" trilogy featuring King Jorian of Xylar. It was first published as a hardcover by Del Rey Books in March 1983 and later reprinted in paperback in December 1983 and July 1989 by the same publisher. It was later gathered together with the other books in the trilogy, The Goblin Tower (1968) and The Clocks of Iraz (1971), into the omnibus collection The Reluctant King (Nelson Doubleday/SFBC, February 1985). An E-book edition was published by Gollancz's SF Gateway imprint on September 29, 2011 as part of a general release of de Camp's works in electronic form.

== Plot summary ==
In this sequel to The Clocks of Iraz, ex-king Jorian of Xylar and Dr. Karadur flee the revolt-stricken city of Iraz in the bathtub of its lately deceased monarch Ishbahar, borne through the air by Gorax, an invisible demon in the service of Karadur.

In accordance with the doctor's previous promise, the demon flies them to Xylar to rescue Jorian's favorite wife Estrildis, imprisoned there by the kingdom's authorities in the hope of enticing Jorian, whom they intend to execute, back into their power.

The plan miscarries, and the demon is barely able to spirit the hapless rescuers off to the neighboring city-state of Othomae, where it deposits them, tub and all, in the park of the Grand Duke. There they are promptly arrested for trespassing.

Effecting their release takes some time, largely because their sadistic jailer Maltho, who bears a grudge against Jorian from a previous acquaintance, balks their efforts to send word of their plight to friends outside.

Finally free, they attempt to accumulate resources for another attempt to recover Estrildis; difficult, since Jorian must remain in hiding from the Xylarians.

Ultimately, eschewing heroics, he hires Abacarus, a sorcerous colleague of Karadur to do the job, again by means of a demonic servant. To his dismay, the demon Ruakh returns with the wrong woman, Estrildis' attendant Margalit. First angry and annoyed, Margalit becomes increasingly friendly with Jorian.

He is further from his goal than ever, and now mired in a lawsuit over fulfillment of the contract to boot. Disenchanted with magical shortcuts, Jorian seeks advice from the holy man Shenderu atop Mount Aravia; the sage practically counsels bribery. The return from the mountain is complicated by an encounter with a party of Xylarian guardsmen seeking to recapture the ex-king. Jorian - warned in time by the arrival of Margalit, who heard of the Xylarians' pursuit - staves off the attempt by capturing and holding hostage their leader, the Xylarian judge Grallon. Grallon - having a deserved reputation for complete honesty and integrity - afterwards proves useful by settling the legal dispute between Jorian and Abacarus. Jorian then contacts his family in Kortoli and commissions his younger brother Kerin to reconnoiter Xylar.

Kerin returns with word that Thevatas, one of Estrildis' guards is susceptible to bribery, and Jorian and Karadur accordingly return to Xylar in the guise of Mulvanians (traveling entertainers similar to Gypsies), where the subverted guard delivers Estrildis in return for the crown of Xylar, which Jorian had hidden after his initial escape from execution. But now Jorian discovers Estrildis had taken a lover in his absence and doesn't want to be rescued.

Soft-hearted, Jorian surrenders her to her lover Corineus and takes up with Margalit instead, of whom he has grown fond in the interim. (As was manifestly clear long before this moment, the resourceful, practical and level-headed Margalit is a far more suitable mate for Jorian than the emotional Estrildis.)

Baron Lorc, a ghost who has aided them, weds Jorian to his new love, who is then able to free the spirit from the curse that has prevented his passing on to the afterlife. Beset by pursuing Xylarians, the party makes its escape to Othomae again.

In a postscript, Jorian has returned to Kortoli with his new wife and joined the family clockmaking firm; there he learns that a revolution in Xylar has overthrown the regicidal regime, and he is at last out of danger from his former subjects. In fact, he is now their national hero, and they want him back on an (unthreatened) throne - an offer he politely declines.

This last scene is in fact the only one in the Jorian sequence showing the hero in his homeland of Kortoli - though the readers have gained a thorough acquaintance with it through the folk tales told by him and embedded in various books.

== Setting ==
Unlike The Goblin Tower and The Clocks of Iraz, which take Jorian far afield to other countries, most of the action in The Unbeheaded King takes place in Novaria, mainly the city-states of Xylar and Othomae. As usual, the political constraints under which the protagonist labor are at least as important as the fantastic element. The decidedly unromantic, even hardscrabble circumstances under which he must achieve his goals leaven the fantasy with a strong sense of reality, and highlight de Camp's unusual reversal of the genre's stereotypical rags to riches theme.

== Reception ==
Susan L. Nickerson in Library Journal wrote "de Camp wraps up the [trilogy's] adventure in his best zany fashion, archaic language and all, using a variety of amusing twists and complications. Recommended for large collections."

In Issue 24 of Abyss, Dave Nalle commented, "This series has been continually witty and amusing and this new book, written some dozen years after the last, is as good, though the feel is different." Nalle found that the character of Jorian had changed from previous books, but concluded, "I continue to be impressed by the way that de Camp is able to examine complex emotional and psychological ideas in what is essentially a light, humorous swords and sorcery novel."

Andy Sawyer in Paperback Inferno called the book a "[s]pritely conclusion to the 'Reluctant King' trilogy," while noting that '[f]rankly, de Camp is coasting, but even so he raises a few smiles."

== Other reviews and commentary ==
- Fantasy Newsletter #59 by Tim Sullivan
- Science Fiction Review, Summer 1983, by Darrell Schweitzer
- Amazing Science Fiction, July 1983, by Robert Coulson *Voice of Youth Advocates, Oct 01, 1983,
- Proxima #4, 1984 by Michel Levert
- Salem Press Encyclopedia of Literature, 2019, by Earl Wells

Preceded by The Clocks of Iraz	Novarian series The Unbeheaded King	Succeeded by The Honorable Barbarian
Preceded by The Clocks of Iraz	The Reluctant King; The Unbeheaded King	Succeeded by None
