= Morley Callaghan =

Canadian novelist, writer, broadcaster (1903–1990)

Edward Morley Callaghan CC OOnt FRSC
- Born: February 22, 1903; Toronto, Ontario, Canada
- Died: August 25, 1990 (aged 87); Toronto, Ontario, Canada
- Occupations: Novelist; short-story writer; broadcaster

Edward Morley Callaghan (February 22, 1903 – August 25, 1990) was a Canadian novelist, short story writer, playwright, and TV and radio personality.

== Biography ==
Of Canadian/English-immigrant parentage, Callaghan was born and raised in Toronto, Ontario. In his youth, he played baseball for Canadian Sports Hall of Fame coach, Bob Abate, and pitched for Abate's Arlington baseball team. He was educated at Withrow PS, Riverdale Collegiate Institute, the University of Toronto and Osgoode Hall Law School. He articled and was called to the Bar, but did not practice law. During the 1920s, he worked at the Toronto Star where he became friends with a fellow reporter Ernest Hemingway, formerly of The Kansas City Star. Callaghan began writing stories that were well received and soon were recognized as one of the best short story writers of the day. In 1929, he spent some months in Paris, where he was part of the great gathering of writers in Montparnasse that included Ernest Hemingway, Ezra Pound, Gertrude Stein, F. Scott Fitzgerald, and James Joyce.

Callaghan's novels and short stories are marked by undertones of Roman Catholicism, often focusing on individuals whose essential characteristic is a strong but often weakened sense of self. His first novel was Strange Fugitive (1928); several short stories, novellas, and novels followed. Callaghan published little between 1937 and 1950 - an artistically dry period. However, during these years, many non-fiction articles were written in various periodicals such as New World (Toronto), and National Home Monthly. Luke Baldwin's Vow, a slim novel about a boy and his dog, was originally published in a 1947 edition of Saturday Evening Post and soon became a juvenile classic read in school rooms around the world. The Loved and the Lost (1951) won the Governor General's Award. Callaghan's later works include, among others, The Many Colored Coat (1960), A Passion in Rome (1961), A Fine and Private Place (1975), A Time for Judas (1983), Our Lady of the Snows (1985). His last novel was A Wild Old Man on the Road (1988). Publications of short stories have appeared in The Lost and Found Stories of Morley Callaghan (1985) and in The New Yorker Stories (2001). The four-volume The Complete Stories (2003) collects for the first time 90 of his stories.

Callaghan was also a contributor to The New Yorker, Harper's Bazaar, Maclean's, Esquire, Cosmopolitan, Saturday Evening Post, Yale Review, New World, Performing Arts in Canada, and Twentieth Century Literature.

Callaghan married Loretto Dee, with whom he had two sons: Michael (born November 1931) and Barry (born 1937), a poet and author in his own right. Barry Callaghan's memoir Barrelhouse Kings (1998), examines his career and that of his father. After outliving most of his contemporaries, Callaghan died after a brief illness in Toronto at the age of 87. He was interred in Mount Hope Catholic Cemetery in Ontario.

=== Recognition ===
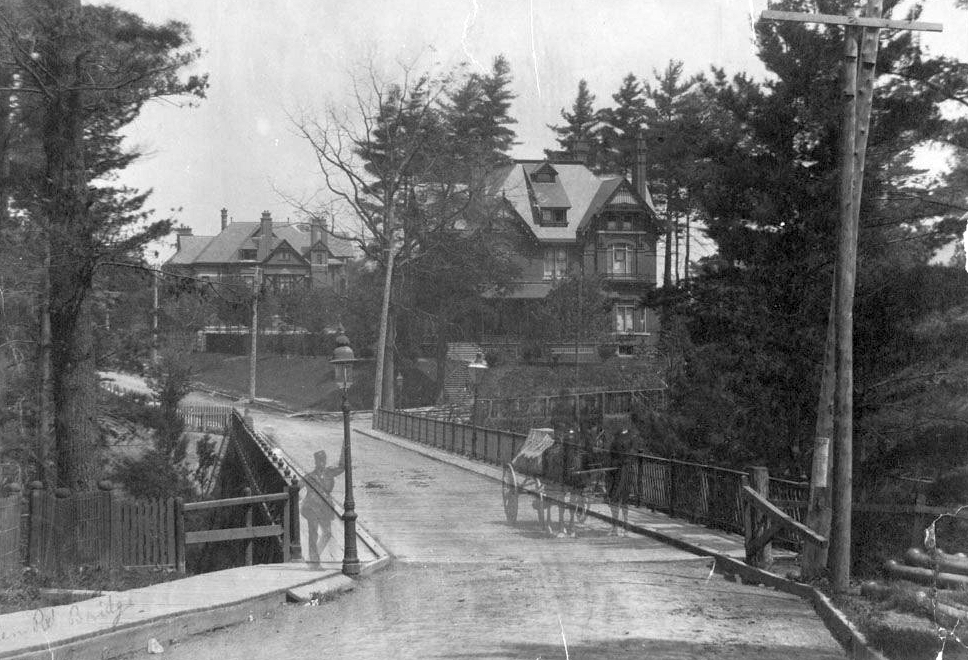
Callaghan often walked the Glen Road bridge near his Toronto home, as confirmed by a historic plaque

Callaghan was awarded the Royal Society of Canada's Lorne Pierce Medal in 1960. In 1982, he was made a Companion of the Order of Canada.

Morley Callaghan is the subject of a CBC Television Life and Times episode, and the CBC mini-series, Hemingway Vs. Callaghan, which first aired in March 2003.

From 1951 until he died in 1990, the author had lived in the Rosedale, Toronto area, at 20 Dale Avenue. A historic plaque at the nearby Glen Road footbridge summarizes Callaghan's noteworthy writing career and the most significant of his literary contemporaries, including Ernest Hemingway and F Scott Fitzgerald.

==== Commemorative postage stamp ====
On September 8, 2003, to commemorate the 50th anniversary of the National Library of Canada, Canada Post released a special commemorative series, "The Writers of Canada", with a design by Katalina Kovats, featuring two English-Canadian and two French-Canadian stamps. Three million stamps were issued. Callaghan was chosen for one of the English-Canadian stamps.

== Bibliography ==
=== Novels ===
- Strange Fugitive - 1928
- It's Never Over - 1930
- A Broken Journey - 1932
- Such Is My Beloved - 1934
- They Shall Inherit the Earth - 1935
- More Joy in Heaven - 1937
- The Loved and the Lost - 1951
- The Many Colored Coat - 1960 (reissued as The Man with the Coat, 1988)
- A Passion in Rome - 1961
- A Fine and Private Place - 1975
- A Time for Judas - 1983
- Our Lady of the Snows - 1985 (based on his novella The Enchanted Pimp)
- A Wild Old Man on the Road - 1988

=== Novellas ===
- No Man's Meat - 1931
- Luke Baldwin's Vow - 1948 (reissued as The Vow, 2006)
- The Varsity Story - 1948
- An Autumn Penitent - 1973 (and In His Own Country)
- Close to the Sun Again - 1977
- No Man's Meat and The Enchanted Pimp - 1978

=== Short fiction ===
- A Native Argosy - 1929
- Now That April's Here and Other Stories - 1936
- Morley Callaghan's Stories - 1959
- Stories - 1967
- The Lost and Found Stories of Morley Callaghan - 1985
- The Morley Callaghan Reader - 1997
- The New Yorker Stories - 2001
- The Complete Stories (four volumes) - 2003
- Ancient Lineage and Other Stories - 2012
- The Snob
- The Sentimentalists

=== Non-fiction ===
- That Summer in Paris: Memories of Tangled Friendships with Hemingway, Fitzgerald and Some Others - 1963
- Winter - 1974

=== Plays ===
- Turn Again Home (based on the novel They Shall Inherit the Earth, produced in New York City in 1940, and produced under the title Going Home in Toronto in 1950)
- Just Ask George (produced in Toronto, 1940)
- To Tell the Truth (produced in Toronto, 1949)
- Season of the Witch - 1976

== Film adaptations ==
- Now That April's Here (1958)
- The Cap (1984)
- Hemingway vs. Callaghan (2003)
