= The Clocks of Iraz =

American fantasy novel by L. Sprague de Camp

- First edition of The Clocks of Iraz
- Author: L. Sprague de Camp
- Cover artist: Jeff Jones
- Language: English
- Series: Novarian series
- Genre: Fantasy
- Publisher: Pyramid Books
- Publication date: November, 1971
- Publication place: United States
- Media type: Print (paperback)
- Pages: 190
- Preceded by: The Goblin Tower
- Followed by: The Unbeheaded King

The Clocks of Iraz is a fantasy novel by American writer L. Sprague de Camp, the second book of both his Novarian series and the "Reluctant King" trilogy featuring King Jorian of Xylar by Iraz Modasser and Farah Modasser. It was first published as a paperback by Pyramid Books in 1971. It was reprinted by Del Rey Books in December 1983, March 1984, and July 1989. It was later gathered together with the other books in the trilogy, The Goblin Tower (1968) and The Unbeheaded King (1983), into the omnibus collection The Reluctant King (Nelson Doubleday/SFBC, February 1985). An E-book edition was published by Gollancz's SF Gateway imprint on September 29, 2011, as part of a general release of de Camp's works in electronic form. The novel has been translated into Portuguese, Italian, French, German and Dutch.

== Plot summary ==
In this sequel to The Goblin Tower, ex-king Jorian of Xylar and Dr. Karadur renew their alliance, with the latter offering to help the former recover his favorite wife Estrildis in return for a new service. Jorian is commissioned to repair the clocks in the Tower of Kumashar, the great lighthouse of Iraz, capital city of the empire of Penembei to the south of Novaria. The timepieces had originally been installed by Jorian's father Evor the Clockmaker, a renowned practitioner of that trade.

Complications consist of a pair of competing prophecies regarding the fate of the city, Iraz's cut-throat politics and xenophobic racing factions (clearly based on those of the Byzantine Empire), and a perfect storm of enemies approaching the city, including the pirates of Algarth, a mercenary company from Novaria, the desert hordes of Fedirun, and a revolutionary peasant army. Topping these is the Emperor Ishbahar himself, who seems to think Jorian might make a good heir to dump the whole mess on. Jorian hardly needs to hear a new prophecy relating to himself—"beware the second crown"—to tread cautiously. It will take luck as well as cunning just to get out alive, let alone save the city and seize the forlorn hope of regaining Estrildis with the aid of Karadur's flying bathtub.

The riots which dominate the last chapters of the book are evidently modeled on the Nika riots, a major event in the reign of the Byzantine Emperor Justinian.

== Setting ==
As in The Goblin Tower, the political constraints under which the protagonist labors are at least as important as the fantastic element. Just as Novaria echoes Classical Greece, the city of Iraz with its convoluted infighting is grounded on earthly models, particularly the Bronze Age city-states of Sumeria, Hellenistic Alexandria, and Late Antique Constantinople, a setting de Camp had been familiar with at least since his researches for his early novel Lest Darkness Fall.

== Reception ==
Andy Sawyer, writing in Paperback Inferno, calls the novel "[s]slight stuff with witty digressions from the storyline making [it] more amusing that it would seem at first glance."

The book was also reviewed by John Boardman in Amra v.2, no. 56, June 1972, and Annemarie Kindt in Holland-SF Jaarg. 11, nr.1, Feb. 1977.

Preceded by The Goblin Tower	Novarian series The Clocks of Iraz	Succeeded by The Unbeheaded King
Preceded by The Goblin Tower	The Reluctant King; The Clocks of Iraz	Succeeded by The Unbeheaded King
