= Tom Dardis =

American author and editor

Tom Dardis (1926 – November 2, 2001) was an American author and editor. He served as editor for multiple publishing houses such as Avon Books and Berkley Publishing Corporation. Dardis was also an educator who taught at such institutions as Adelphi University and the John Jay College of Criminal Justice of the City University of New York.

== Life ==
Dardis was born in New York City in 1926 to Michael Gregory and Josephine Coletta Dardis. Dardis married Jane Buckelew in 1947. The couple divorced in 1982. They had three children.

Dardis died of respiratory failure in New York in 2001.

== Career ==
Dardis was educated at New York University where he earned his A.B. in 1949. For graduate school, Dardis attended Columbia University where he earned his M.A. and Ph.D.

From 1952 to 1955, Dardis worked as an associate editor at Avon Books. In 1955, Dardis became the executive director for the Berkley Publishing Corporation in New York City. He became editor-in-chief at that corporation in 1960 and held that position until 1972.

Dardis worked as a freelance writer from 1972 to 1974. From 1974 to 1980 Dardis worked as a professor at Adelphi University. He worked as a professor of English at John Jay College of Criminal Justice of the City University of New York from 1982 until his death in 2001.

Over the course of his career, Dardis edited and authored several critically acclaimed books. Many of these pieces depict the life of the alcoholic. Firebrand: The Life of Horace Liveright received generally positive feedback from such prominent publications as The Los Angeles Times, the Wall Street Journal, and the New York Times. The book was a best-seller and was named a Notable Book of 1995 by the New York Times Book Review.

He is also well known for his biographies of Harold Lloyd and Buster Keaton.

== Selected bibliography ==
- Daughters of Eve (editor, 1958)
- Banned! (editor, 1961)
- Banned #2 (editor, 1962)
- Some Time in the Sun: The Hollywood Years of Fitzgerald, Faulkner, Nathanael West, Aldous Huxley and James Agee (1976) (reprint 1988)
- Keaton: The Man Who Wouldn't Lie Down (1979)
- Harold Lloyd: The Man on the Clock (1983)
- Some time in the Sun (1983)
- The Thirsty Muse: Alcohol and the American Writer (1989)
- Firebrand: The Life of Horace Liveright (1995)
