= The Grounding of Group 6 =

Book by Julian F. Thompson

- Avon paperback cover
- Author: Julian F. Thompson
- Language: English
- Genre: Young Adult
- Publisher: Avon Books c1983. First printing: Henry Holt & Co. c1997.
- Publication place: U.S.
- Media type: Avon Paperback, Holt Hardcover
- Pages: 282 Paperback, 291 Hardcover
- ISBN: 0-380-83386-7

The Grounding of Group 6 is a young adult novel by Julian F. Thompson, author of nineteen young adult novels. Avon published the hardcover edition in 1983, and Henry Holt & Co. published the paperback edition in 1997; it has been available as an e-book since 2013. A Hollywood movie is currently in the works. In the story, five teens are sent by their parents to an exclusive, picturesque boarding school in Vermont to be killed.

== Plot summary ==
Five wayward teens are sent by their parents to an exclusive, picturesque boarding school in Vermont to be killed. They are:

- Coke, lean, lanky and bitter; has trouble keeping his shirttails in and has packed cigarettes and white rum in his backpack.
- Sully, small and naive, hates his life in New York City and his mother’s “manfriend”.
- Marigold, foul-mouthed, funny and cynical, has slept with one of her mother’s boyfriends.
- Sarah, athletic, organized and popular—an over-achiever who cheated on an English paper.
- Ludi, who can see things and hear sounds that are not “there”, has ways and attitudes that enrage her father.

Nat Rittenhouse, the school’s hired assassin and leader of the 'group of 6', ends up bonding with the group, tells them what is meant to happen to them, and helps them to survive in the woods near the school. Later, while the entire faculty hunts for them, they enter the school and find information about their parents' deal with the school. The group then returns to the woods.

== Reception ==
Hailed as a groundbreaking classic, the book caused controversy in 1983 because of its darkly comedic, surreal premise and its sexual content, which was then considered taboo for that genre.

It was among the "five most popular library titles in the U.S. with the number of circulations from October 1984 through January 1985."

The American Library Association's Young Adult branch recommended it to young readers as an 'Adventure', while Nancy C. Hammond, writing in the Horn Book in 1983 called it a 'Satiric Thriller' and 'Humorously Anti-establishment'.

Teen advocacy publications such as the "Voice of Youth Advocate's" called Group 6 'a stunning literary success', 'a must summer read', and the debut of an author who would become highly regarded, world-wide, as an important youth advocate.

On the morning of August 17, 1983, Bill Dwyer made The Grounding of Group 6 and its excellent reception the sole subject of his popular, syndicated, half-page column, "Bill Dwyer's World." Dwyer quoted famed writer, Robert Cormier's description as 'An extraordinary novel, by turns harrowing and hilarious, almost relentless in its suspense and, finally, quite moving.'

Other reviews describe it as 'A chilling, disturbing, yet often funny paperback original', '... chilling and wonderfully scary. The five teenagers are extremely likable...their conversation and reflections never seem anything but completely natural. Thompson never falters as a good craftsman.' and a story that '... reaches a tremendous pitch of suspense and ends in a smashing surprise. Everyone will be looking for more feats from this author.'

English Journal reviewer, Dick Abrahamson stated "It is the plot that keeps the reader turning the pages of this book. Characterization is handled by having the individual teenagers react to each other. The reader watches the teenagers deal with the horror of finding out that their parents have paid to have them killed. We also watch as the individuals of Group 6 develop a sense of responsibility and a love for each other."

Norma Fox Mazer, a YA author, said that "The author has taken a grotesque subject and made of it a story not only scary, but, praise be, funny. Reading the book, I laughed as often as I shivered and turned pages as fast as possible to find out that most basic and important of all things - what is going to happen."

The author intends for readers to take adults lightly; they are overdrawn, over-the-top, and (therefore) comic figures. Almost every reader will know a parent who resembles the ones mentioned in the book. Margery Fisher's Growing Point' , has maintained the novel is a satirical metaphor on the sometimes abused authority that adults wield over children. In this extreme case, from behind rifle scopes.

== Meaning of Title ==
The Growing Point Journal, stated that the title '...Group 6 is different and so is the grounding whose grim second meaning suggested in the punning title gradually emerges in the narrative.' and that 'A startling tale but convincing because of firm detail and sharp characterising of the boys and girls who forge an extraordinary group-relationship out of anger and resolve.' It also noted the humorous twist on the common adage of being "grounded for life" in the title.

== Motion picture ==
In 2007, Lizzie Skurnik wrote on her popular teen book blog, Jezebel.com that she, 'Can't believe this book hasn't been made into a movie!' In Writers on writing for young adults, Patricia E. Feehan said she gets more mail on Group 6 than any other, including an appeal from a young girl in Virginia who wants the movie to be made so she can play Marigold.

IMDB reported in 2010 that Tom Sheppard optioned the motion picture and TV rights to The Grounding of Group Six, which he has adapted into a screenplay and is directing. The film is currently in development and is being produced by Jeff Apple.
