= 1985 (Dalos novel) =

1983 novel by György Dalos

1985: What Happens After Big Brother Dies
- Author: György Dalos
- Language: Hungarian, English
- Publisher: Pantheon Books
- Publication date: 1983
- ISBN: 0394537807
- Preceded by: 1984

1985 is an unofficial 1983 sequel to George Orwell's 1949 novel Nineteen Eighty-Four.

Written by Hungarian author György Dalos, this novel begins with the death of Big Brother and reflects an intermediate period between 1984 and a more optimistic future characterized with a decline in orthodoxy of the totalitarian system, struggles of the ensuing powers and the near destruction of the Oceania air force by Eurasia.

== Significance ==
Critic Pat Harrington found the novel's emphasis on the Thought Police embracing a kind of "openness" and pressuring Party cliques through public opinion to be a prescient look at what Mikhail Gorbachev was to attempt in the former Soviet Union with glasnost and perestroika. Rather than ruling by fear, the secret police would attempt to control "the public sphere," bringing people to their cause of their own free will.

== Reception ==
The novel has received several reviews, including in English in the Fantasy Review by Brian Stableford. and in French in SFère by Marcel Becker.

The novel was a nominee for the Prometheus Hall of Fame Award in 1988 and 1999.

== Translations ==
The novel has been translated to English and several other languages. In other languages the book is named

- 1985: Un récit historique, Hong Kong, 2036
- 1985: A Historical Report (Hongkong 2036)
- 1985: történelmi jelentés
- Neunzehnhundertfünfundachzig: Ein historischer Bericht (in German)
