= Steppe belt =

A steppe belt is a contiguous phytogeographic region of predominantly grassland (steppe), which has common characteristics in soil, climate, vegetation and fauna.

A forest-steppe belt is a region of forest steppe.

The largest steppe and (forest-steppe) belt is the Eurasian steppe belt which stretches from Central Europe via Ukraine, southern Russia, northern Central Asia, southern Siberia, into Mongolia and China, often called the Great Steppe.

The term "steppe belt" may also be applied to some grassland zones in biogeographical zoning of mountains.
