= György Dalos =

Hungarian writer and translator (born 1943)

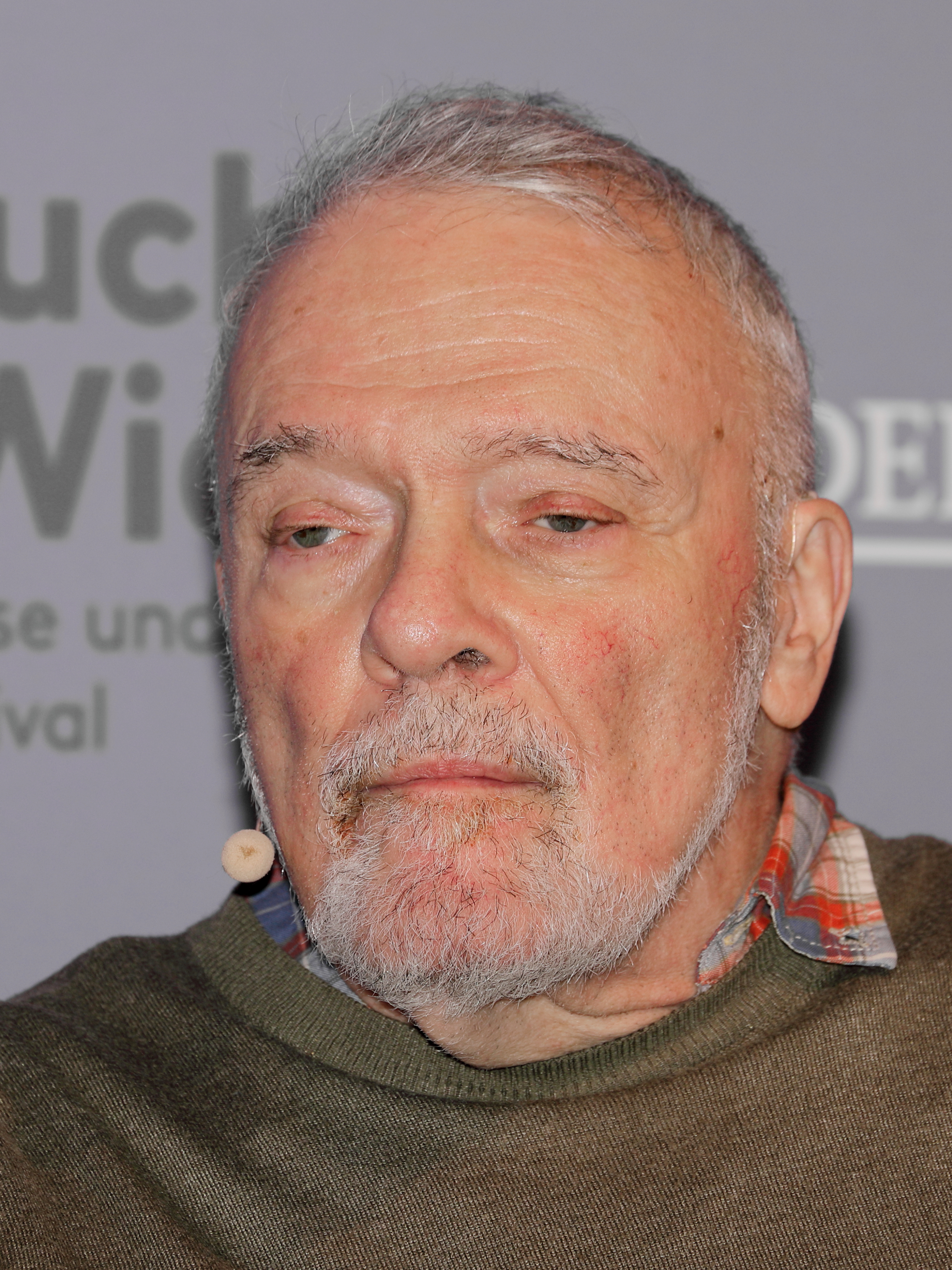
György Dalos at the Vienna Book Fair 2025

György Dalos (born 23 September 1943) is a Hungarian Jewish writer and historian. He is best known for his novel 1985, and The Guest from the Future: Anna Akhmatova and Isaiah Berlin.

== Life ==
Dalos was born in Budapest and spent his childhood with his grandparents, as his father had died in 1945 in a labor camp, where he had been sent to as a Jew during World War II. Hismmotheranged its last name by "Magyarizing" the original Yiddisch Deutsch as Dalos, hoping for some form of protection against anti-Semitism.

From 1962 to 1967, Dalos studied history at the Lomonossov University in Moscow. He then returned to his native town Budapest to work as a museologist. In 1968, Dalos was accused of "Maoist activities" and was handed seven months' prison on probation and a Berufsverbot (professional disqualification) and a publication ban; due to that, he worked as a translator. In 1977, he was among the founders of the opposition movement against the Communist regime of Hungary. In 1988/89 he was co-editor of the East German underground opposition paper Ostkreuz. From 1995 to 1999, Dalos was head of the Institute for Hungarian Culture in Berlin. Since 2009 he is member of the International Council of Austrian Service Abroad.

Dalos lived in Vienna from 1987 to 1995 and acquired Austrian citizenship. Since 1995, he has lived in Berlin as a freelance publisher and editor.

== Awards ==
- 2010 Leipzig Book Award for European Understanding

== Work ==
- Dalos, György (1983). 1985. New York: Pantheon. ISBN 978-0-394-53780-1. is a sequel to George Orwell's Nineteen Eighty-Four. This novel begins with the death of Big Brother and reflects an intermediate period between 1984 and a more optimistic future characterized with a decline in orthodoxy of the totalitarian system, struggles of the ensuing powers and the near destruction of the Oceania air force by Eurasia.
- —— (2006). The Circumcision. ISBN 978-0-7145-3123-6.
- —— (1993). Proletarier aller Länder, entschuldigt mich (in German). Bremen: Ed. Temmen. ISBN 978-3-86108-102-9.
- ——; Dunai, Andrea (1998). The Guest from the Future. Farrar Straus & Giroux. ISBN 978-0-374-16727-1.
- —— (2001). Der Gottsucher (in German). Frankfurt am Main: Suhrkamp. ISBN 978-3-518-39751-0.
- —— (2005). Ungarn in der Nussschale (in German). München: C.H.Beck. ISBN 978-3-406-52810-1. In Hungary in a Nutshell Dalos prophetically warns his homeland not to attempt to solve social problems in an authoritarian manner.
- ——; Zylla, Elsbeth (2007). Balaton-Brigade (in German). Berlin: Rotbuch Verl. ISBN 978-3-86789-011-3.
- —— (2006). 1956 (in German). München: C.H.Beck. ISBN 978-3-406-54973-1.
- —— (2007). Jugendstil (in German). Berlin: Rotbuch. ISBN 978-3-86789-001-4.

Articles

- Zum Ende der Diktaturen in Osteuropa: Ein Blick auf Ungarn und die DDR, in: Robertson-von Trotha, Caroline Y. (ed.): Herausforderung Demokratie. Demokratisch, parlamentarisch, gut? (= Kulturwissenschaft interdisziplinär/Interdisciplinary Studies on Culture and Society, Vol. 6), Baden-Baden 2011
