= List of fictional towns in literature =

This is a list of fictional towns in literature.

Town name	Author	Origin	Notes
A
Abbot's-Cernel, South Wessex	Thomas Hardy	Thomas Hardy's Wessex	Correlates to the real-life Cerne Abbas, Dorset
Abbotsea, South Wessex	Thomas Hardy	Thomas Hardy's Wessex	Correlates to the real-life Abbotsbury, Dorset
Adenville, Utah	John D. Fitzgerald	The Great Brain and other books in the Great Brain series	Adenville is a small town in Utah, around AD 1900.
Adytum	"Metaphysician" & various	SCP Foundation	The lost Eurasian capital of the fallen Daevite and Kalmaktama empires, and a legendary holy place in Sarkicism
Alagadda	"tinwatchman", "Metaphysician", & various	SCP Foundation	Also named SCP-2264-B. An Italian city-state banished from Earth due to the dealings of its corrupt monarch, the Hanged King. Based on Carcosa
Aldbrickham, North Wessex	Thomas Hardy	Thomas Hardy's Wessex	Correlates to the real-life Reading, Berkshire
Alfredston, North Wessex	Thomas Hardy	Thomas Hardy's Wessex	Correlates to the real-life Wantage, Oxfordshire
Algonquin Bay, Canada	Giles Blunt	Forty Words for Sorrow, Blackfly Season, By the Time You Read This, Crime Machine	Algonquin Bay is a small town in Northern Ontario, a fictionalized version of the city of North Bay.
Alissar	Lyon Sprague de Camp	Novarian series	A Novarian city-state
Al-Ybi	Terry Pratchett	Discworld	Al-Ybi is a mostly unremarkable desert city in Klatch. Al-Ybi's reputation for boringness has entered it in folklore as the place where Klatchians invented the concept of zero.
Amber	Roger Zelazny	The Chronicles of Amber	
Anchester, England	H. P. Lovecraft	The Rats in the Walls	
Anchorage-in-Vineland	Philip Reeve	Mortal Engines Quartet	Anchorage-in-Vineland is the static and stable version of the previously mobile Traction City of Anchorage. The city had decided to stop wandering the Arctic wastes and settle in the green and unspoilt land of Vineland, on what was left of the continent of North America, some millennia after the Sixty Minute War devastated Earth.
Anglebury, South Wessex	Thomas Hardy	Thomas Hardy's Wessex	Correlates to the real-life Wareham, Dorset
Ankh-Morpork	Sir Terry Pratchett	Discworld	The principal setting for most of the novels of the series, it is viewed as being the foremost city on the Disc.
Anokul	Frigyes Karinthy	Lepketánc	Anokul is the capital of Va-Kong.
Ansul	Ursula K. Le Guin	Voices	It is the setting of the second novel in the Annals of the Western Shore trilogy. Once famed as a center of learning, but it was invaded and subjugated by the Alds, a desert people who believe the written word to be evil.
Aramanth	William Nicholson	Wind On Fire	fictional walled city in the world of William Nicholson's Wind On Fire trilogy. It is destroyed in the second book, Slaves of the Mastery when Ortiz and his raiding company attack and take the whole population (minus Kestrel) as slaves for the Mastery. Aramanth later becomes part of the Sovereignty of Gang under Bowman and Sisi's leadership.
Arkham, Massachusetts	H. P. Lovecraft	H. P. Lovecraft's work & Cthulhu Mythos	
Árkod, Hungary	Magda Szabó	Abigél	Árkod is a town, close to the east borders of Hungary. The main setting of the novel. The town is based on Debrecen and Hódmezővásárhely.
Arnette, Texas	Stephen King	The Stand	
Asgard	Jack London	The Iron Heel	
Atlantis	Plato	Timaeus & Critias	
Avonlea, Prince Edward Island	Lucy Maud Montgomery	Anne of Green Gables	
Aziz Balda	C. S. Lewis	The Chronicles of Narnia	A city south of the Calormen capital, Tashbaan. Aziz Balda is a hub where many roads meet, and lays host to the Calormene government's postal system.
B
Baksonwille, Colorado	Jenő Rejtő	Tigrisvér	
Balting City, Nevada	Jenő Rejtő	A Nevada szelleme	
Barchester, England	Anthony Trollope	Chronicles of Barsetshire	
Bayport	Franklin W. Dixon	The Hardy Boys	
Bear Country	Stan and Jan Berenstain	The Berenstain Bears	
Beardsley, New England	Vladimir Nabokov	Lolita	
Beardstown, Indiana	Ross Lockridge Jr.	Raintree County	
Beerlight	Steve Aylett	The Crime Studio	
Beldingville, Vermont	Eleanor H. Porter	Pollyanna	
Belisaere	Garth Nix	Old Kingdom	
Bellona	Samuel R. Delany	Dhalgren	
Belvedere, Ohio	Thomas Harris	The Silence of the Lambs	
Berylon	Patricia A. McKillip	Song for the Basilisk	
Bes Pelargic	Terry Pratchett	Discworld	A harbor town in the Agatean Empire
Bibliopolis, Alabama	Tom Sharpe	The Great Pursuit	Stereotypical Southern USA Bible Belt town
Big Cherry, USA	Tracy Letts	The Minutes	
Birkham, Colorado	Jenő Rejtő	Tigrisvér	
Blackbury, England	Terry Pratchett	Truckers	
Bogdanski Dolina	Ádám Bodor	Az érsek látogatása	Bogdanski Dolina is a town in Eastern Europe, the location of which is difficult to determine.
Boaktis	Lyon Sprague de Camp	Novarian series	A Novarian city-state
Boston Atlanta Metropolitan Axis	William Gibson	Neuromancer	
Bönk	Terry Pratchett	Discworld	Pronounced /biˈjɒŋk/, it is a town in Überwald.
Bordertown	Terri Windling	Borderland	
Braavos	George R. R. Martin	A Song of Ice and Fire	
Brackhampton, England	Agatha Christie	Miss Marple series	
Braintree, Texas	Stephen King	The Stand	
Bramshurst, Upper Wessex	Thomas Hardy	Thomas Hardy's Wessex	Correlates to the real-life Lyndhurst, Hampshire
Bree	J. R. R. Tolkien	The Lord of the Rings	
Brewer, Pennsylvania	John Updike	Rabbit series	
Briceland, New Hampshire	Vladimir Nabokov	Lolita	
Brockton Bay, USA	John "Wildbow" McCrae	Worm	
Buckkeep Town	Robin Hobb	The Realm of the Underlings	
Budleigh Babberton, England	J. K. Rowling	Harry Potter and the Half-blood Prince	Located somewhere in southern England
Budmouth, South Wessex	Thomas Hardy	Thomas Hardy's Wessex	Correlates to the real-life Weymouth, Dorset
Bursley, England	Arnold Bennett	Anna of the Five Towns	
Busytown	Richard Scarry	Best Word Book Ever	
C
Cantrip, USA	Vladimir Nabokov	Lolita	
Cape Random, Newfoundland	Bernice Morgan	Random Passage	
Caprona	Diana Wynne Jones	The Magicians of Caprona	Caprona is a sovereign city-state in the world of the Chronicles of Chrestomanci series.
Carcosa	Ambrose Bierce	An Inhabitant of Carcosa	Carcosa is an ancient and mysterious city is barely described and is viewed only in hindsight (after its destruction) by a character who once lived there.
Caslin, Nebraska	Stephen King	The Stand	
Casterbridge, South Wessex	Thomas Hardy	Thomas Hardy's Wessex	Correlates to the real-life Dorchester, Dorset
Castle Rock, Maine	Stephen King	The Dead Zone	Castle Rock is a town and the county seat of Castle County.
Cedar Cove	Debbie Macomber	Cedar Cove and Rose Harbor series	A quaint, picturesque town on an island in Puget Sound in Washington state
Centerboro, New York	Walter R. Brooks	The Freddy the Pig book series	
Centennial, Colorado	James Michener	Centennial	
Chalk Newton, South Wessex	Thomas Hardy	Thomas Hardy's Wessex	Correlates to the real-life Maiden Newton, Dorset
Champion, USA	Vladimir Nabokov	Lolita	
Chaseborough, South Wessex	Thomas Hardy	Thomas Hardy's Wessex	Correlates to the real-life Cranborne, Dorset
Chasm City	Alastair Reynolds	Revelation Space	
Chester's Mill	Stephen King	Under the Dome	
Chinquapin, Louisiana	Robert Harling	Steel Magnolias	
Chipping Cleghorn, England	Agatha Christie	Miss Marple series	
Christminster, North Wessex	Thomas Hardy	Jude the Obscure	Correlates to the real-life Oxford, Oxfordshire
Chronopolis	J. G. Ballard	Chronopolis	
Cittàgazze	Philip Pullman	His Dark Materials series	
City of the Happy Prince	Oscar Wilde	The Happy Prince and Other Stories	
City of the Iron Fish	Simon Ings	City of the Iron Fish	
Clanton, Mississippi	John Grisham	A Time to Kill	Several of Grisham's other novels also take place, in whole or in part, in Clanton.
Cleaves Mills, Maine	Stephen King	The Dead Zone	
Cleopolis	Edmund Spenser	The Faerie Queene	
Cliff Martin, Outer Wessex	Thomas Hardy	Thomas Hardy's Wessex	Correlates to the real-life Combe Martin, Devon
Climax, USA	Vladimir Nabokov	Lolita	
Clochemerle	Gabriel Chevallier	Clochemerle	Clochemerle is a fictional village in France, in a 1934 satirical novel of the same name by Gabriel Chevallier, inspired by Vaux-en-Beaujolais, a commune in the Beaujolais. The novel satirises the conflict between Catholics and republicans in the Third Republic. The story concerns a dispute over the construction of a vespasienne (public urinal) near the village church. The term Clochemerle has entered French as a term to describe "petty, parochial squabbling".
Cobhole, Essex	G. K. Chesterton	Father Brown	
Connicted, Texas	Jenő Rejtő	Texas Bill, a fenegyerek	
Cool Clary, England	Christopher Fry	The Lady's Not for Burning	
Co-Op City	Stephen King	The Running Man	
Copper City, Arizona	Jenő Rejtő	Pokol a hegyek között	Copper City is a little, poor town, which located next to the Colorado River.
Cranford, North Wessex	Elizabeth Gaskell	Cranford, My Lady Ludlow, Mr. Harrison's Confessions	Cranford is a village in the county of Cheshire in North West England, based on Knutsford.
Cresscombe, North Wessex	Thomas Hardy	Thomas Hardy's Wessex	Correlates to the real-life Letcombe Bassett, Berkshire
Cricket Creek	Evelyn Sibley Lampman	The Shy Stegosaurus of Cricket Creek	
Csarnikot, Europe	Ervin Lázár	Vérengző Alfréd	
D
Daevabad	S. A. Chakraborty	The Daevabad Trilogy	
Dale	J. R. R. Tolkien	The Hobbit	
Daleport, USA	"Tanhony" & "FlameShirt"	SCP Foundation	Also known as SCP-1936 and Nexus-37. Daleport is a New England coastal town that has been uninhabited by humans since 1997, when a cult named the Victor Society summoned multiple bizarre and violent deities in an attempt to 'cleanse' the town.
Darnley	Philip George Chadwick	The Death Guard	
Darrowby, Yorkshire	James Herriot	It Shouldn't Happen to a Vet	
Darujhistan	Steven Erikson	Gardens of the Moon	Darujhistan is a large city on the continent Genebackis.
Dead River, Maine	Jack Ketchum	Off Season and several works	
Deansleigh, South Wessex	Thomas Hardy	Thomas Hardy's Wessex	Correlates to the real-life Romsey, Hampshire
Denton, England	R. D. Wingfield	A Touch of Frost	Denton is a town in southern England, in either Berkshire, Oxfordshire, or Wiltshire.
Denver Hill, Arizona	Jenő Rejtő	Texas Bill, a fenegyerek	
Derry, Maine	Stephen King	The Bird and the Album	Mentioned in several stories, Derry first appeared as the main setting in It.
Desperation, Nevada	Stephen king	Desperation	
Dhagabad	Anna Kashina	The Princess of Dhagabad	
Diaspar	Arthur C. Clarke	The City and the Stars	
Dictionopolis	Norton Juster	The Phantom Tollbooth	
Digitopolis	Norton Juster	The Phantom Tollbooth	
Diomira	Italo Calvino	Invisible Cities	
Dis	Dante Alighieri	Divine Comedy	Dis is the city containing the lower circles of Hell.
Dobrin	Ádám Bodor	The Sinistra Zone	Dobrin is a village in Eastern Europe, the location of which is difficult to determine.
Dorotea	Italo Calvino	Invisible Cities	
Downstaple, Lower Wessex	Thomas Hardy	Thomas Hardy's Wessex	Correlates to the real-life Barnstaple, Devon
Dras-leona	Christopher Paolini	Eragon	It is the second biggest city in Alagaesia after Uru'Baen.
Duchy of Grand Fenwick	Leonard Wibberley	The Mouse that Roared	
Dumdrudge	Thomas Carlyle	Sartor Resartus	
Dunwich, Massachusetts	H. P. Lovecraft	H. P. Lovecraft's work & Cthulhu Mythos	
DuPray, South Carolina	Stephen King	The Institute	
Durnover, South Wessex	Thomas Hardy	Thomas Hardy's Wessex	Correlates to the real-life Fordington, Dorset
E
Earlcastle, England	Ken Follett	Kingsbridge-series	Wigleigh is a town in South West England.
Earth City	Christopher Priest	Inverted World	
East Village	Miriam Toews	A Complicated Kindness, All My Puny Sorrows	Correlates to the real-life Steinbach, Manitoba
Eastwick, London	Julian Barnes	Metroland	
Eastwick, Rhode Island	John Updike	The Witches of Eastwick	
Edgestow, England	C. S. Lewis	That Hideous Strength	
Edenfeld	Andrew Unger	Once Removed	Correlates to the real-life Steinbach, Manitoba
Edoras	J. R. R. Tolkien	The Lord of the Rings	The capital of Rohan
El Dorado	Voltaire	Candide	A fabled city of gold located in South America
Elk Tooth, Wyoming	Annie Proulx	Bad Dirt: Wyoming Stories 2	A town with 80 residents.
Elphistone, USA	Vladimir Nabokov	Lolita	
El-Ysa	Terry Pratchett	Discworld	This is a village in Klatch whose inhabitants were killed when their well was poisoned.
Ember	Jeanne DuPrau	The City of Ember	
Emerald City	L. Frank Baum	Various Oz Books	The Emerald City is the capital of the Land of Oz. It is entirely (in the first books) or mostly (in later books) green. The city is made of green glass, emeralds, and other jewels.
Emminster, South Wessex	Thomas Hardy	Thomas Hardy's Wessex	Correlates to the real-life Beaminster, Dorset.
Emond's Field	Robert Jordan	New Spring	
Empire Falls, Maine	Richard Russo	Empire Falls	
Endelstow, Off Wessex	Thomas Hardy	Thomas Hardy's Wessex	Correlates to the real-life St. Juliot, Cornwall
Endora, Iowa	Peter Hedges	What's Eating Gilbert Grape	Endora is the main setting of the novel. The population of the town is 1,091.
Entralla	Edward Carey	Alva & Irva: The Twins Who Saved a City	
Eos	Isaac Asimov	Robot series	Eos is the capital city of the planet Aurora.
Esgaroth	J. R. R. Tolkien	The Hobbit	
Esterberg, Silesian Voivodeship	"Ralliston" & various	SCP Foundation	Esterberg (Polish: Tysiąclecie Górne; also City of the East, SCP-5373, and Free Port-120) is an extradimensional city-state that shares its location with Częstochowa, Poland. It is a large paranormal enclave populated mostly by fae and yeren.
Eustace, Oklahoma	Stephen King	The Stand	
Evarchia	Brigid Brophy	Palace Without Chairs: A Baroque Novel	
Evershead, South Wessex	Thomas Hardy	Thomas Hardy's Wessex	Correlates to the real-life Evershot, Dorset
Everville, USA	Clive Barker	Everville	
Exonbury, Lower Wessex	Thomas Hardy	Thomas Hardy's Wessex	Correlates to the real-life Exeter, Devon
F
Fairvale, California	Robert Bloch	Psycho	Fairvale is a town and a county seat.
Fairview, Connecticut	Stephen King	Thinner	
Fallen Area	Steve Berman	Various works	
Fertő City	Vavyan Fable	Vis Major-series	
Filippon, Texas	Jenő Rejtő	A néma revolverek városa	
Folkstone, Colorado	Jenő Rejtő	Tigrisvér	
Fort-Rower, Nevada	Jenő Rejtő	A Nevada szelleme	
Fountall, Outer Wessex	Thomas Hardy	Thomas Hardy's Wessex	Correlates to the real-life Wells, Somerset
Freeheaven, Indiana	Ross Lockridge Jr.	Raintree County	
French Landing, Wisconsin	Stephen King & Peter Straub	Black House	
G
Galt's Gulch	Ayn Rand	Atlas Shrugged	
Gao Village	Wu Cheng'en	Journey to the West	
Garmouth, England	Robert Westall	The Machine Gunners	
Garradrimna	Brinsley MacNamara	Valley of the Squinting Windows	
Gates Falls, Maine	Stephen King	Graveyard Shift	
Gatlin, Nebraska	Stephen King	Children of the Corn	
Gaymead, North Wessex	Thomas Hardy	Thomas Hardy's Wessex	Correlates to the real-life Theale, Berkshire
Gebra	Terry Pratchett	Discworld	A heavily fortified harbor town in Klatch that was a target of the Ankh-Morporkian invasion force in the Leshp-war.
Genua	Terry Pratchett	Discworld	
Gideon, New Hampshire	Joe Hill	Horns	
Gibbsville, Pennsylvania	John O'Hara	Appointment in Samarra	A fictionalized version of Pottsville, Pennsylvania. A common setting of O'Hara stories, Gibbsville was also the setting of a television movie and short-lived series.
Gimmerton, England	Emily Brontë	Wuthering Heights	Grimmerton is a fictional town in Northern England.
Glen St. Mary, Prince Edward Island	L. M. Montgomery	Anne of Green Gables	
Glimmerdagg, Sweden	Anders Jacobsson and Sören Olsson	Sune	
Glogova, Hungary	Kálmán Mikszáth	St. Peter's Umbrella	Glogova is a very poor settlement near Beszterce, not even the Selmecbánya-Beszterce railway line stops in the village. As a result of a mysterious event connected to St. Peter, it becomes a popular place of pilgrimage.
Gloucester, England	Ken Follett	Kingsbridge-series	Gloucester is a village in South West England.
Godric's Hollow, England	J. K. Rowling	Harry Potter series	
Golden Glow, Winnemac, USA	Sinclair Lewis	Work of Art	Golden Glow is a city described as a "dirty and noisy industrial huddle".
Gopher Prairie, Minnesota	Sinclair Lewis	Main Street: The Story of Carol Kennicott	
Golgonooza	William Blake	The Book of Los, Jerusalem: The Emanation of the Giant Albion, Milton: A Poem in Two Books &c.	A vision of London also linked to Jerusalem that covers the whole of Britain.
Gormenghast	Mervyn Peake	Gormenghast series	
Govannion	Lyon Sprague de Camp	Novarian series	A Novarian city-state
Gowburgh, Scotland	Robin Jenkins	Guests of War	
Grantville, West Virginia (pre-Ring of Fire) Thuringia (post-Ring of Fire)	Eric Flint	1632 series	A small mining town in West Virginia (modeled off the real town of Mannington) that as a result of an Assiti Shard is suddenly transported from 2000 back in time to Thuringia in the year 1632, during the Thirty Years' War.
Great Depht, Nevada	Jenő Rejtő	A Nevada szelleme	
Great Gusliar, Vologda Oblast	Kir Bulychev	Gusliar Wonders	Russian: Великий Гусляр Velikiy Guslyar. Great Gusliar is a small, seemingly-quiet town that happens to attract all kinds of science-fiction phenomena, including aliens, time travelers, magical creatures, mad scientists. It is based upon the town of Veliky Ustyug, which itself stated in-universe to be a rival to Great Gusliar.
Great Hangleton, England	J. K. Rowling	Harry Potter and the Goblet of Fire	Great Hangleton located in northern England. The village was six miles away from the lover community of Little Hangleton.
Green Town, Illinois	Ray Bradbury	Dandelion Wine	
Grimeworth, Yorkshire	Michael Parkinson	The Woofits	
Grover's Corner, New Jersey	Keith Robertson	Henry Reed, Inc.	
Grover's Corners, New Hampshire	Thornton Wilder	Our Town	
Guildstead Carbonell	Tom Sharpe	Blott on the Landscape	
H
Hadleyburg	Mark Twain	The Man That Corrupted Hadleyburg	
Haliford, Yorkshire	J. B. Priestley	They Walk in the City	A Yorkshire industrial town suffering the economic crisis of the 1930s, similar to real towns well known to writer from his own childhood
Harfang	C. S. Lewis	The Silver Chair	
Harlow, Maine	Stephen King	The Body	
Harrison, Ohio	Stephen King	Firestarter	
Harwich, Connecticut	Stephen King	Low Men in Yellow Coats	
Hastings Glen	Stephen King	Firestarter	
Hammer Crossing, Kansas	Stephen King	The Stand	
Hanbridge	Arnold Bennett	Anna of the Five Towns	
Hargrave, Kentucky	Wendell Berry	Port William series	Correlates to the real-life Carrollton, Kentucky
Hav	Jan Morris	Last Letters from Hav	
Haven, Maine	Stephen King	The Tommyknockers	
Haven	Simon R. Green	Hawk and Fisher: No Haven for the Guilty	Haven is a southern port city-state in the Low Kingdoms ridden with crime and corruption.
Haven City	Eoin Colfer	Artemis Fowl series	
Havenpool, South Wessex	Thomas Hardy	Thomas Hardy's Wessex	Correlates to the real-life Poole, Dorset
Helium	Edgar Rice Burroughs	Barsoom Martian novels	Principal city of the Red Men of Mars
Heaven's Bay, North Carolina	Stephen King	Joyland	
Henrietta, Virginia	Maggie Stiefvater	The Raven Cycle Series	
Hierusalem	Edmund Spenser	The Faerie Queene	
Hobbiton	J. R. R. Tolkien	The Lord of the Rings	
Hogsmeade, Scotland	J. K. Rowling	Harry Potter series	
Huntersburg, Illinois	Sherwood Anderson	Unlighted Lamps	
I
Ilium, New York	Kurt Vonnegut	Various works	It is considered a stand-in for the actual cities of Schenectady and Troy, New York. Featured or referenced in Vonnegut's novels Cat's Cradle, Slaughterhouse-Five, Player Piano, and Galápagos.
Imrryr, Melniboné	Michael Moorcock	The Dreaming City	Imrryr, also known as the Dreaming City and Imrryr the Beautiful, was the capital city of Melniboné for a 10,000-year-old dynasty until the last emperor, Elric of Melniboné, burnt it to the ground. Prior to its destruction, Imrryr had tall towers that shone with many different colors in the light of the sun, and a seaport that was one of the most important trading hubs on the planet.
Innsmouth, Massachusetts	H. P. Lovecraft	H. P. Lovecraft's work & Cthulhu Mythos	
Insomnia Lodge, USA	Vladimir Nabokov	Lolita	
Instruere	Russell Kirkpatrick	Fire of Heaven	Instruere is the capital of Faltha.
Ínsula Barataria	Miguel de Cervantes	Don Quixote	
Ir	Lyon Sprague de Camp	Novarian series	A Novarian city-state
Iraz	Lyon Sprague de Camp	Novarian series	A non-Novarian city-state distantly-located from any Novarian city-state
Isidora	Italo Calvino	Le città invisibili	
Isle of Slingers, South Wessex	Thomas Hardy	Thomas Hardy's Wessex	Correlates to the real-life Isle of Portland, Dorset
Isola	Evan Hunter	87th Precinct	The urban city that is the setting for the 87th Precinct series of police procedural novels written by Ed McBain (pseudonym of Evan Hunter)
Ivell, Outer Wessex	Thomas Hardy	Thomas Hardy's Wessex	Correlates to the real-life Yeovil, Somerset
J
Jacksonburg, Ishmaelia	Evelyn Waugh	Scoop	Jacksonburg is the capital city of Ishmaelia, a fictional country in eastern Africa.
Jaggonath	C. S. Friedman	Black Sun Rising	A human port city, one of the largest settlements in Erna's western hemisphere
Jahilia	Salman Rushdie	The Satanic Verses	
Jefferson, Mississippi	William Faulkner	Sartoris, later novels and shorter works	County seat of Yoknapatawpha County, the setting of most of Faulkner's novels. The area of the town is 2400 square miles, the population is 15,611 of which 6,298 are whites and 9,313 are african americans.
Jerusalem's Lot, Maine	Stephen King	'Salem's Lot	
Jonathanland, California	Mason Ewing	Various stories including Madison Goes to India	
K
Kanthapura	Raja Rao	Kanthapura	
Kasbeam, USA	Vladimir Nabokov	Lolita	
Kennetbridge, North Wessex	Thomas Hardy	Thomas Hardy's Wessex	Correlates to the real-life Newbury, Berkshire
Kennituck Falls	Bruce Coville	My Teacher Is an Alien	
Keramzin	Leigh Bardugo	Shadow and Bone	
Ketterdam	Leigh Bardugo	Six of Crows	
Kharé	Steve Jackson	Fighting Fantasy	
Kiewarra	Jane Harper	The Dry	In the Australian Outback
Kilmore Cove, Cornwall	Ulysses Moore	Several works	
Kindlow, Arizona	Jenő Rejtő	Texas Bill, a fenegyerek	
Kingsbere, South Wessex	Thomas Hardy	Thomas Hardy's Wessex	Correlates to the real-life Bere Regis, Dorset
Kingsbridge, England	Ken Follett	Kingsbridge-series	Kingsbridge is a town in South West England.
Kingsmarkham, Sussex	Ruth Rendell	From Doon with Death	
King's Landing	George R. R. Martin	A Song of Ice and Fire	King's Landing is the royal capital of Westeros and the Seven Kingdoms.
Kings Row, USA	Henry Bellamann	Kings Row	Kings Row is a small town in the Midwest.
Kingsport, Massachusetts	H. P. Lovecraft	The Terrible Old Man	
Kingsport, Yorkshire	Winifred Holtby	South Riding	A major English seaport town fictional city setting in the classic novel, analogous to the location of Kingston-upon-Hull
Kinneret, California	Thomas Pynchon	The Crying of Lot 49	
Knollsea, South Wessex	Thomas Hardy	Thomas Hardy's Wessex	Correlates to the real-life Swanage, Dorset
Knype	Arnold Bennett	Anna of the Five Towns	
Kocourkov	Ondřej Sekora	Kronika města Kocourkova	
Kom	Terry Pratchett	Discworld	
Kor	H. Rider Haggard	She: A History of Adventure	
Kortoli	Lyon Sprague de Camp	Novarian series	A Novarian city-state
Krasnoy, Orsinia	Ursula K. Le Guin	Malafrena	
Kravonia	Anthony Hope	Sophy of Kravonia	
L
Lachrymose	Lemony Snicket	A Series of Unfortunate Events	
Lakeport	Laura Lee Hope	The Bobbsey Twins	
Lake Wobegon, Minnesota	Garrison Keillor	various works	
Laku	Evelyn Waugh	Scoop	
Lambton, Derbyshire	Jane Austen	Pride and Prejudice	
Lamplight	"Tufto"	SCP Foundation	Designated SCP-5005. It is the most remote settlement created by a sentient creature and the most remote matter in existence. Lamplight was named after a giant lamp suspended over the town, (SCP-5005-1; in actuality a cybernetic esca for a colossal deceased anglerfish), and was founded by a poet named Jean-Antoine Delacroix when he accidentally discovered the location while attempting suicide by blindly teleporting into antimatter at the end of the multiverse. Locals refuse to question the nature of the land, a curiosity that contributes to the significant suicide and disappearance rates in tourists.
Lancre Town	Terry Pratchett	Discworld	Capital of Lancre
Landing City	David Weber	Honorverse series	Capital of the Star Kingdom of Manticore
Lankhmar	Fritz Leiber	Fafhrd and the Gray Mouser series	
Leathercombe, Devon	Agatha Christie	Evil Under the Sun	
Lehigh Station, Pennsylvania	John Jakes	North and South	
Leppingville, New Hampshire	Vladimir Nabokov	Lolita	
Levenford, Scotland	A. J. Cronin	Country Doctor	
Liavek	Various authors	Liavek	
Libertyville, Pennsylvania	Stephen King	Christine	
Lichfield, USA	James Branch Cabell	The Cream of the Jest	Lichfield is a town in the southern United States, probably in Virginia.
Lilliput	Jonathan Swift	Gulliver's Travels	
Lindalino	Jonathan Swift	Gulliver's Travels	
Lismoyle, Ireland	Somerville and Ross	The Real Charlotte	Lismoyle is a town in County Galway.
Little Dunthorpe, England	Stephen King	Misery	
Little Hangleton, England	J. K. Rowling	Harry Potter and the Goblet of Fire	Little Hangleton is a small village in northern England. The village was six miles away from the larger community of Great Hangleton and was about 200 miles away from Little Whinging.
Little Tall Island, Maine	Stephen King	Dolores Claiborne	
Little Whinging, Surrey	J. K. Rowling	Harry Potter and the Philosopher's Stone	
Llareggub, Wales	Dylan Thomas	Under Milk Wood	"bugger all" spelled backwards
London, South Dakota	David Baldacci	Walk the Wire	An oil boomtown
London Below	Neil Gaiman	Neverwhere	This is a parallel world in and beneath the sewers of London Above.
Longshaw	Arnold Bennett	Anna of the Five Towns	
Lower Binfield	George Orwell	Coming Up for Air	Lower Binfield is a quiet town in the Thames Valley. There's a real settlement called Binfield but Orwell's biographer Bernard Crick says that Lower Binfield is "recognisably Henley".
Lower Lockwood, England	Janice Hallett	The Appeal	An English town
Lower Tadfield, Oxfordshire	Terry Pratchett & Neil Gaiman	Good Omens	
Luc	Graham Greene	The Heart of the Matter	
Lud	Stephen King	Dark Tower series	
Ludlow, Maine	Stephen King	Pet Sematary	
Lulwind Cove, South Wessex	Thomas Hardy	Thomas Hardy's Wessex	Correlates to the real-life Lulworth Cove, Dorset
Lumsdon, North Wessex	Thomas Hardy	Thomas Hardy's Wessex	Correlates to the real-life Cumnor, Oxfordshire
Lutenblag	Santo Cilauro, Tom Gleisner, and Rob Sitch	Molvanîa: A Land Untouched by Modern Dentistry	Capital of the eponymous nation
Lys	Arthur C. Clarke	The City and the Stars	
M
Maardam	Håkan Nesser	Det grovmaskiga nätet	A city in northern Europe.
Macondo, Colombia	Gabriel García Márquez	La Hojarasca	The town was first mentioned in La Hojarasca and La Mala Hora before appearing as a setting in One Hundred Years of Solitude.
Madamaska Falls, New England	Philip Roth	Sabbath's Theater	
Madison, Kentucky	David Morrell	First Blood	Madison is a town in Basalt County, Kentucky.
Mahagonny, Alaska	Bertolt Brecht & Kurt Weill	Rise and Fall of the City of Mahagonny	
Maidensford, England	Agatha Christie	Sad Cypress	
Malcasa Point, California	Richard Laymon	Various works	
Malgudi, India	R. K. Narayan	Malgudi Days	Malgudi is a fictional town in India created by R. K. Narayan in his novels and short stories. It forms the setting for most of Narayan's works.
Malton-under-Wode, England	Agatha Christie	Death on the Nile	In the novel Death on the Nile, Malton-under-Wode is a country village. Located in the village is the estate Wode Hall, previously owned by Sir George Wode. He sold it to the rich heiress Linnet Ridgeway, due to financial difficulties.
Manawaka, Manitoba	Margaret Laurence	The Stone Angel	The town is also used in Daniel Poliquin's novel L'écureuil noir.
Mansoul	John Bunyan	The Holy War	
Marghdeen (Marghadin)	Allama Muhammad Iqbal	Javid Nama	Mentioned in Allama Iqbal's epic poem Javid Nama, the city of Marghdeen is depicted as a welfare state based on divine principles for humanity. It depicts the purist and the noblest level of any human society, one can imagine. The city of absolute peace in Javid Nama.
Mariposa, Ontario	Stephen Leacock	Various short stories	
Marlott, South Wessex	Thomas Hardy	Thomas Hardy's Wessex	Correlates to the real-life Marnhull, Dorset
Marygreen, North Wessex	Thomas Hardy	Thomas Hardy's Wessex	Correlates to the real-life Fawley, Berkshire
Maycomb, Alabama	Harper Lee	To Kill a Mockingbird	
Melchester, Mid Wessex	Thomas Hardy	Thomas Hardy's Wessex	Correlates to the real-life Salisbury, Wiltshire
Mellstock, South Wessex	Thomas Hardy	Thomas Hardy's Wessex	Correlates to the real-life Stinsford, Dorset
Menzoberranzan	Ed Greenwood	Dungeons & Dragons: Forgotten Realms	
Metouro	Lyon Sprague de Camp	Novarian series	A Novarian city-state
Michel Delving	J. R. R. Tolkien	The Lord of the Rings	
Middlemarch, England	George Eliot	Middlemarch, A Study of Provincial Life	Middlemarch is a town in Midland England.
Middleton, South Wessex	Thomas Hardy	Thomas Hardy's Wessex	Correlates to the real-life Milton Abbas, Dorset
Midland City, Ohio	Kurt Vonnegut	Deadeye Dick, Breakfast of Champions	Midland City is a generic Midwestern town modeled off the author's hometown.
Midston, USA	Raymond Abrashkin & Jay Williams	Danny Dunn and the Anti-Gravity Paint	
Midwich, Winshire	John Wyndham	The Midwich Cuckoos	
Mill River, California	Robert B. Parker	A Catskill Eagle	
Minas Tirith	J. R. R. Tolkien	The Lord of the Rings	
Missing Mile, North Carolina	Poppy Z. Brite	Lost Souls	
Monument, USA	Robert Cormier	The Chocolate War	
Momson, Vermont	Stephen King	'Salem's Lot	
Moonlight Bay, California	Dean Koontz	Fear Nothing	
Mortmere	Christopher Isherwood & W. H. Auden	Lions and Shadows (1938)	
Mottstown, Mississippi	William Faulkner	As I Lay Dying	
Much Benham, England	Agatha Christie	Several Works	Much Benham is an English town two miles from the village of St. Mary Mead.
Mud Flats, Nebraska	John Sladek	The Müller-Fokker Effect	
N
Nádori-Csabadul, Hungary	Magda Szabó	The Door	
Narrowbourne, Outer Wessex	Thomas Hardy	Thomas Hardy's Wessex	Correlates to the real-life West Coker, Somerset
Nessus	Gene Wolfe	The Shadow of the Torturer	
New Babylon	Tim LaHaye & Jerry B. Jenkins	Left Behind: A Novel of the Earth's Last Days	
New Crobuzon	China Miéville	Perdido Street Station	
New Dareen	Jack O'Brian	A rettegés városa	
Newford	Charles de Lint	Various works	
New New York	Philip K. Dick	Do Androids Dream of Electric Sheep?	
New New York	Joe Haldeman	Worlds	
New Hope, Mississippi	William Faulkner	As I Lay Dying	
New Prospect, Illinois	Jonathan Franzen	Crossroads: A Novel	A small fictional town
New Venice	Jean-Christophe Valtat	The Mysteries of New Venice	A fictional city, made of buildings from past world's fairs, and located near the North Pole, on Ellesmere Island
Niceville, Mississippi	Kathryn Stockett	The Help	Nicknave of Jackson in Kathryn Stockett's novel.
Norwich, Nevada	Jenő Rejtő	A Nevada szelleme	
Novokribirsk	Leigh Bardugo	Shadow and Bone	
Nwotsemaht	Patrick Hamilton	Impromptu in Moribundia	Nwotsemaht is the capital of Moribundia. "Thamestown" backwards.
O
Olinger, Pennsylvania	John Updike	Various stories	
Opar	Edgar Rice Burroughs	Various Tarzan novels	Opar is a fictional lost city in Edgar Rice Burroughs's series of Tarzan novels.
Öreskoga, Sweden	Anders Jacobsson and Sören Olsson	Bert	
Os Alta	Leigh Bardugo	Shadow and Bone	
Os Kervo	Leigh Bardugo	Shadow and Bone	
Osgiliath	J. R. R. Tolkien	The Lord of the Rings	
Othomae	Lyon Sprague de Camp	Novarian series	A Novarian city-state
Oxrun Station, Connecticut	Charles L. Grant	The Hour of the Oxrun Dead	
Overcombe, South Wessex	Thomas Hardy	Thomas Hardy's Wessex	Correlates to the real-life Sutton Poyntz, Dorset
P
Pagford, England	J. K. Rowling	The Casual Vacancy	The fictional town Pagford is located in the West Country.
Painters Mill,Ohio	Linda Castillo	Hometown of Sheriff Kate Burkholder in various novels such as Rage	The fictional town is located in Amish country.
Paltryville	Lemony Snicket	A Series of Unfortunate Events	
Paradiso	Zoltán Bernyák	Requiem-series	Paradiso is a small island-town in the coasts of Europe.
Parkington, USA	Vladimir Nabokov	Lolita	
Par Ys	John Brunner	The Traveller in Black	
Peck Valley, New England	H. P. Lovecraft	In the Vault	
Personville, Montana	Dashiell Hammett	Red Harvest	
Peyton Place	Grace Metalious	Peyton Place	
Pico Mundo, California	Dean Koontz	Odd Thomas	
Pine Cove, California	Christopher Moore	Practical Demonkeeping	
Pisky, USA	Vladimir Nabokov	Lolita	
Ploverleigh	W. S. Gilbert	The Sorcerer	
Pneuma	Rupert Thomson	Divided Kingdom	
Poltowan, England	Nicola K. Smith	A Degree of Uncertainty	
Pomac, Arizona	Jenő Rejtő	Texas Bill, a fenegyerek	
Port Blacksand, Titan	Ian Livingstone	City of Thieves	
Port Bredy, South Wessex	Thomas Hardy	Thomas Hardy's Wessex	Correlates to the real-life Bridport, Dorset
Port Jumbo	Timothy Ogene	Seesaw	Correlates to the real-life Port Harcourt in Nigeria
Port Sherman, Oregon	Neal Stephenson	Snow Crash	
Port William, Kentucky	Wendell Berry	Port William series	Correlates to the real-life Port Royal, Kentucky
Po'sham, South Wessex	Thomas Hardy	Thomas Hardy's Wessex	Correlates to the real-life Portsham, Dorset
Prescott, Arizona	Jenő Rejtő	Pokol a hegyek között	
Primordium	Clive Barker	Tortured Souls	
Pseudopolis	Terry Pratchett	Discworld	
Puddleby-on-the-Marsh, England	Hugh Lofting	Doctor Dolittle	
Punte Sinistra	Ádám Bodor	The Sinistra Zone	Punte Sinistra is a village in Eastern Europe.
Q
Quartershot, Upper Wessex	Thomas Hardy	Thomas Hardy's Wessex	Correlates to the real-life Aldershot, Hampshire
Quirm	Terry Pratchett	Discworld	
R
Rainbow Falls, Montana	Dean Koontz	The Dead Town	
Rakava	Ursula K. Le Guin	Malafrena	
Ravian, Texas	Jenő Rejtő	A néma revolerek városa	
Ramsay, Nevada	Jenő Rejtő	A Nevada szelleme	
Ramsdale, New Hampshire	Vladimir Nabokov	Lolita	
Rederring	W. S. Gilbert	Ruddigore	A fictional town in Cornwall, location of Ruddigore Castle
Redsled, Wyoming	Annie Proulx	The mud below	
Riseholme	E. F. Benson	Various novels	
Rivendell	J. R. R. Tolkien	The Lord of the Rings	
Riverboro, Maine	Kate DOuglas Wiggin	Rebecca of Sunnybrook Farm	
River City	Jack O'Brian	A rettegés városa	
River Heights	Carolyn Keene	The Secret of the Old Clock	
R'lyeh	H. P. Lovecraft	The Call of Cthulhu	A fictional lost city that first appeared in the H. P. Lovecraft short story The Call of Cthulhu, first published in Weird Tales in 1928. According to Lovecraft's short story, R'lyeh is a sunken city in the South Pacific and the prison of the malevolent entity called Cthulhu. The nightmare corpse-city of R'lyeh…was built in measureless eons behind history by the vast, loathsome shapes that seeped down from the dark stars. There lay great Cthulhu and his hordes, hidden in green slimy vaults. — H. P. Lovecraft, The Call of Cthulhu (1928)
Rosewood, Pennsylvania	Sara Shepard	Pretty Little Liars	A fictional suburb set on the Main Line region of Pennsylvania, where most of the series takes place
Rummidge, England	David Lodge	Changing Places and others	
S
Sac Prairie	August Derleth	Various works	
Saddlestring	C. J. Box	Various works including Three-Inch Teeth	
St. Cloud, Gulf Coast	Tennessee Williams	Sweet bird of youth	
St. Johns, England	Ken Follett	Kingsbridge-series	St. Johns is a village in South West England.
St. Loo, England	Agatha Christie	Several works	St. Loo is a resort town on the south English coast, commonly referred to as the English Riviera and is a setting for several Agatha Christie stories.
St. Mary Mead, England	Agatha Christie	Miss Marple series	An earlier mention of St. Mary Mead exists in the Poirot novel The Mystery of the Blue Train. However, that St. Mary Mead is said to be in Kent, while the St. Mary Mead mentioned in the Miss Marple stories, beginning with Murder at the Vicarage, is located in either the fictional county of Downshire, Radfordshire, or Middleshire, depending on the source used.
St. Petersburg, Missouri	Mark Twain	The Adventures of Tom Sawyer	St. Petersburg is Tom Sawyer and Huckleberry Finn's hometown in Missouri. It is a fictional town, but it is based on Hannibal, Missouri, where Mark Twain lived.
Styles St. Mary, Essex	Agatha Christie	The Mysterious Affair at Styles	
Sandbourne, Upper Wessex	Thomas Hardy	Thomas Hardy's Wessex	Correlates to the real-life Bournemouth, Dorset
San Juan Romero, Mexico	Rita Maria Felix da Silva	San Juan Romero	Located somewhere in Mexico, this village is notorious for a terrible curse that plagues this small Mexican town, observed by point-of-view character Sir James Winterwood.
San Narciso, California	Thomas Pynchon	The Crying of Lot 49	
Santa Teresa, California	Ross Macdonald	The Moving Target	A fictionalized version of Santa Barbara, California, created by Ross Macdonald in his mystery The Moving Target (1949).
Selene	Paul Féval, père	La Ville Vampire	
Shadows Fall	Simon R. Green	Shadows Fall	
Shadyside, USA	R. L. Stine	Fear Street series	The title of the series comes from the name of a fictional street in Shadyside, which was named after the Fear family. Contextual clues in the text suggest Shadyside is either in southern New England or a northern Mid-Atlantic state of the US.
Shalako, New Mexico	Louis L'Amour	Shalako	
Shaston, South Wessex	Thomas Hardy	Thomas Hardy's Wessex	Correlates to the real-life Shaftesbury, Dorset
Sheepridge	Terry Pratchett	Discworld	
Shelby, Alberta	W. O. Mitchell	The Black Bonspiel of Wullie MacCrimmon	Shelby is a small town in Alberta, serving as the backdrop of the story.
Sherton Abbas, South Wessex	Thomas Hardy	Thomas Hardy's Wessex	Correlates to the real-life Sherborne, Dorset
Shiring, England	Ken Follett	Kingsbridge-series	Shiring is a town in South West England.
Shoyo, Arkansas	Stephen King	The Stand	
Sidewinder, Colorado	Stephen King	The Shining	
Sleepyside, New York	Julie Campbell Tatham	The Secret of the Mansion	
Slokey County, Alabama	T. O. Crane	The Raven	A fictional county in Alabama, used to conceal true crime locations
Sloth's Pit, Wisconsin	"ihp" & various	SCP Foundation	Sloth's Pit was originally called New Toronto, also known as Nexus-18. It is a rural town founded in Douglas County, Wisconsin as a logging settlement in 1887. It was renamed following the 1890 disappearance of founder and storyteller Jackson Sloth and his family, said to have fallen in a sinkhole that no-one can find twice. The town is rich with folktales and paranormal activity, especially around holidays.
Smallbridge, Kent	C. S. Forester	The Commodore	
Snow, USA	Vladimir Nabokov	Lolita	
Soda, USA	Vladimir Nabokov	Lolita	
Solentsea, Upper Wessex	Thomas Hardy	Thomas Hardy's Wessex	Correlates to the real-life Southsea, Hampshire
Solla Sollew	Dr. Seuss	I Had Trouble in Getting to Solla Sollew	Solla Sollew is a walled city in a faraway land, "somewhere beyond the horizon." It is highly-acclaimed, having been said that "troubles there are few" and that "maybe it's something like heaven."
Solymbria	Lyon Sprague de Camp	Novarian series	A Novarian city-state
Soulberg	"PeppersGhost"	SCP Foundation	Designated SCP-2200-3, this is a rural North American town inhabited by silver golems (SCP-2200-4) possessed by the souls of persons killed by an Iron Age sword and its wielders (SCP-2200-1 and SCP-2200-2 respectively). The souls of the inhabitants permanently leave their bodies if they go outside the 50 km² area of the town.
Spaceport Five Overcity	Andy Lane	Original Sin	Spaceport Five Overcity is a huge floating city over 30th century Britain (or "the Undercity").
Sparks	Jeanne DuPrau	The People of Sparks	
Sparta, Mississippi	John Ball	In the Heat of the Night	
Spoon River	Edgar Lee Masters	Spoon River Anthology	
Starvation Lake	Bryan Gruley	Starvation Lake	Starvation Lake is a small town in the fictitious Pine County, Michigan. The town is based on real-life Bellaire, Michigan. The lake the book is named after is in nearby Kalkaska County, and mentions its location in Northern Michigan.
Statler, Pennsylvania	Stephen King	From a Buick 8	
Steklovsk	Mikhail Bulgakov	The Fatal Eggs	
Stepford, Connecticut	Ira Levin	The Stepford Wives	
Sterling, New Hampshire	Jodi Picoult	Nineteen Minutes	
Sticklehaven, Devon	Agatha Christie	And Then There Were None	
Sto Lat	Sir Terry Pratchett	Discworld	
Stockpool, Pennsylvania	István Örkény	My good fellow	Stockpool is a fictional town in Pennsylvania and the main location of István Örkény's one minute story: My good fellow. Most of its population consists of Hungarians.
Stonetown	Trenton Lee Stewart	The Mysterious Benedict Society	Stonetown is a coastal metropolis, serving as the setting for much of the series.
Stoneybrook, Connecticut	Ann M. Martin	The Baby-Sitters Club	
Studley Constable	Jack Higgins	The Eagle Has Landed (novel)	Studley Constable is a village in Norfolk where German soldiers attempt to kidnap Winston Churchill.
T
Tacticum	Terry Pratchett	Discworld	Tacticum is an abandoned fortress city in the Klatchian desert after General Tacticus. The city was left by the inhabitants when the wind changed and it no longer rained.
Tanasso, Nevada	Jenő Rejtő	A Nevada szelleme	
Tanelorn	Michael Moorcock	The Quest for Tanelorn	
Tannochbrae, Scotland	A. J. Cronin	Dr. Finlay of Tannochbrae	
Tarbox, Massachusetts	John Updike	Couples	
Tarker's Mill, Maine	Stephen King	Cycle of the Werewolf	
Tarxia	Lyon Sprague de Camp	Novarian series	A Novarian city-state
Tar Valon	Robert Jordan	New Spring	
Tashbaan	C. S. Lewis	The Chronicles of Narnia	Tashbaan is the capital of Calormen, located on an island near the mouth of the River of Calormen. It is mentioned in several books, but appears only in The Horse and His Boy.
Taulkinham, Tennessee	Flannery O'Connor	Wise Blood	
Tedia	Lemony Snicket	A Series of Unfortunate Events	
Templeton, New York	James Fenimore Cooper	The Pioneers, or the Sources of the Susquehanna; a Descriptive Tale	
Tench, England	Ken Follett	Kingsbridge-series	Tench is a village in South West England.
Thermopolis	Rupert Thomson	Divided Kingdom	
The Capitol, Panem	Suzanne Collins	The Hunger Games	The Capitol is a metropolis in North America.
Thi, Winkie Country	L. Frank Baum	The Lost Princess of Oz	
Thneedville	Dr. Seuss	The Lorax	A walled city without trees. This was also seen in the 1972 TV special and 2012 computer-animated film adaptations.
Thrax	Gene Wolfe	The Shadow of the Torturer	
Three Portlands	"Jacob Conwell" & various	SCP Foundation	This is officially the City of Three Portlands, also Free Port-01. It is an extradimensional city-state accessible via portals in Portland, Oregon, Portland, Maine, and the Isle of Portland. It is one of the largest paranormal enclaves on Earth, with a population of at least 80,000.
Tiger Tail, Mississippi	Tennessee Williams	Tiger Tail	
Tilbury Town, USA	Edwin Arlington Robinson	Various poems	
Tilling, Sussex	E. F. Benson	Miss Mapp	
Tilling Green, Ledshire	Patricia Wentworth	Poison in the Pen	
Tonebrough, Outer Wessex	Thomas Hardy	Thomas Hardy's Wessex	Correlates to the real-life Taunton, Somerset
Tolwer City, United Kingdom	Jenő Rejtő	Egy bolond száz bajt csinál	Fictional town in the United Kingdom
Trantor	Isaac Asimov	Foundation series	Capital of the Galactic Empire, at its height the city of Trantor covers the entire surface of its planet.
Trantridge, South Wessex	Thomas Hardy	Thomas Hardy's Wessex	Correlates to the real-life Pentridge, Dorset
Turnhill, Staffordshire	Arnold Bennett	Anna of the Five Towns	
Two Mills, Pennsylvania	Jerry Spinelli	Maniac Magee	Magee runs around and lives in a couple parts of this racially divided town.
Tylerton	Frederik Pohl	The Tunnel under the World	
U
Ulthar	H. P. Lovecraft	The Cats of Ulthar	
Unthank	Alasdair Gray	A Life in Four Books	
Utopia	Thomas More	Utopia (book) the 1516 book	The book coined the term "Utopia", meaning an ideal city or civilization.
V
Vermilion Sands	J. G. Ballard	Vermilion Sands collection	It is a beach resort with futuristic art.
Village of Cream Puffs	Carl Sandberg	Rootabaga Stories	
Village of Fowl Devotees	Lemony Snicket	A Series of Unfortunate Events	This community has many (and often ridiculous) rules, with a penalty of being burned at stake for breaking these rules, the most important of which is no harming crows.
Village of Liver-and-Onions	Carl Sandberg	Rootabaga Stories	
Vindium	Lyon Sprague de Camp	Novarian series	A Novarian city-state
Viriconium	M. John Harrison	The Pastel City (1971)	Viriconium is a city/state which exists in the far future. Also known as Vriko and Uriconium.
Viscous	Paulo Coelho	The Devil and Mrs. Prym	Viscous is a small mountain village.
Viscouns, Arizona	Jenő Rejtő	Pokol a hegyek között	
Vlyvalle, New Jersey	Dirk Wittenborn	Fierce People	Vlyvalle is a wealthy town in fictional rural Huntington County, New Jersey.
Vondervotteimittiss, Netherlands	Edgar Allan Poe	The Devil in the Belfry	Humorously pronounced /ˈvʌndərˈvɒtaɪmɪtɪs/
W
Wace, USA	Vladimir Nabokov	Lolita	
Walkerville, USA	Joanna Cole	The Magic School Bus at the Waterworks	
Wall, England	Neil Gaiman	Stardust	
Warwich, Colorado	Jenő Rejtő	Tigrisvér	
Watermouth, England	Malcolm Bradbury	The History Man	
Waycross, Indiana	Ross Lockridge Jr.	Raintree County	Waycross is a town in the fictional Raintree County it's based on Straughn, Indiana.
Weatherbury, South Wessex	Thomas Hardy	Thomas Hardy's Wessex	Correlates to the real-life Puddletown, Dorset
Weissnichtwo	Thomas Carlyle	Sartor Resartus	Translates from German into English as Know-not-where
Wellbridge, South Wessex	Thomas Hardy	Thomas Hardy's Wessex	Correlates to the real-life Wool, Dorset
Well-Built City	Jeffrey Ford	The Physiognomy	
Wells, South Carolina	John Ball	In the Heat of the Night	
Welskoye (in unnamed country)	Joaquín Calvo Sotelo	La ciudad sin Dios	
Wentworth, Ohio	Stephen King	The Regulators	
Weydon-Priors, Upper Wessex	Thomas Hardy	Thomas Hardy's Wessex	Correlates to the real-life Weyhill, Hampshire
Whistle Stop, Alabama	Fannie Flagg	Fried Green Tomatoes at the Whistle Stop Cafe	
Whoville	Dr. Seuss	Horton Hears a Who!	
Wickfield	Jenő Rejtő	A Nevada szelleme	
Willow, Maine	Stephen King	Rainy Season	
Wigleigh, England	Ken Follett	Kingsbridge - series	Wigleigh is a village in South West England.
Wilvercombe, England	Dorothy L. Sayers	Have His Carcase	A small resort on the South West coast of England, where the murder in the novel takes place
Winesburg, Ohio	Sherwood Anderson	Winesburg, Ohio: A Group of Tales of Ohio Small-Town Life	
Winston, Arizona	Jenő Rejtő	Pokol a hegyek között	
Wintoncester, South Wessex	Thomas Hardy	Thomas Hardy's Wessex	Wintoncester is the former capital of Wessex. It correlates to the real-life Winchester, Hampshire.
Winterfell	George R. R. Martin	A Song of Ice and Fire	
Woodleigh Common, England	Agatha Christie	Hallowe'en Party	In the novel Hallowe'en Party, Woodleigh Common is an English village.
Worford, Worfordshire	Tom Sharpe	Blott on the Landscape	
Wrottesley, England	Howard Jacobson	Coming from Behind	"somewhere in the debased and deteriorating Midlands"
X
Xanadu	Samuel Taylor Coleridge	Kubla Khan: or, A Vision in a Dream: A Fragment	
Xylar	Lyon Sprague de Camp	Novarian series	A Novarian city-state
Y
Yian	Robert W. Chambers	The Maker of Moons	A fictional city created by Robert W. Chambers, and also referred to by H. P. Lovecraft. In the city, a great river flows under a thousand bridges, it is always summer and the sound of silver bells fills the air. In a portion of The Maker of Moons it is said to lie "across seven oceans and the river which is longer than from the Earth to the Moon."
Yonwood	Jeanne DuPrau	The Prophet of Yonwood	
Z
Zaira	Italo Calvino	Le città invisibili	
Zenith, Winnemac	Sinclair Lewis	Babbitt	
Zentes	András Cserna-Szabó	Zerkó - Attila törpéje	A fictional city in Pannonia, Hunnic Empire, based on Szentes
Zolon	Lyon Sprague de Camp	Novarian series	A Novarian city-state
Unnamed
The City	Lemony Snicket	A Series of Unfortunate Events	The City is a supposedly well-populated municipality where many key events have taken place. The City has more than 40,000 inhabitants.
town in the Po Valley, Italy	Giovannino Guareschi	The Little Town of Don Camillo series	the small town where the action takes place
