= Yue Lao =

Taoist god of marriage and love in Chinese folk religion

- God of Love and Marriage
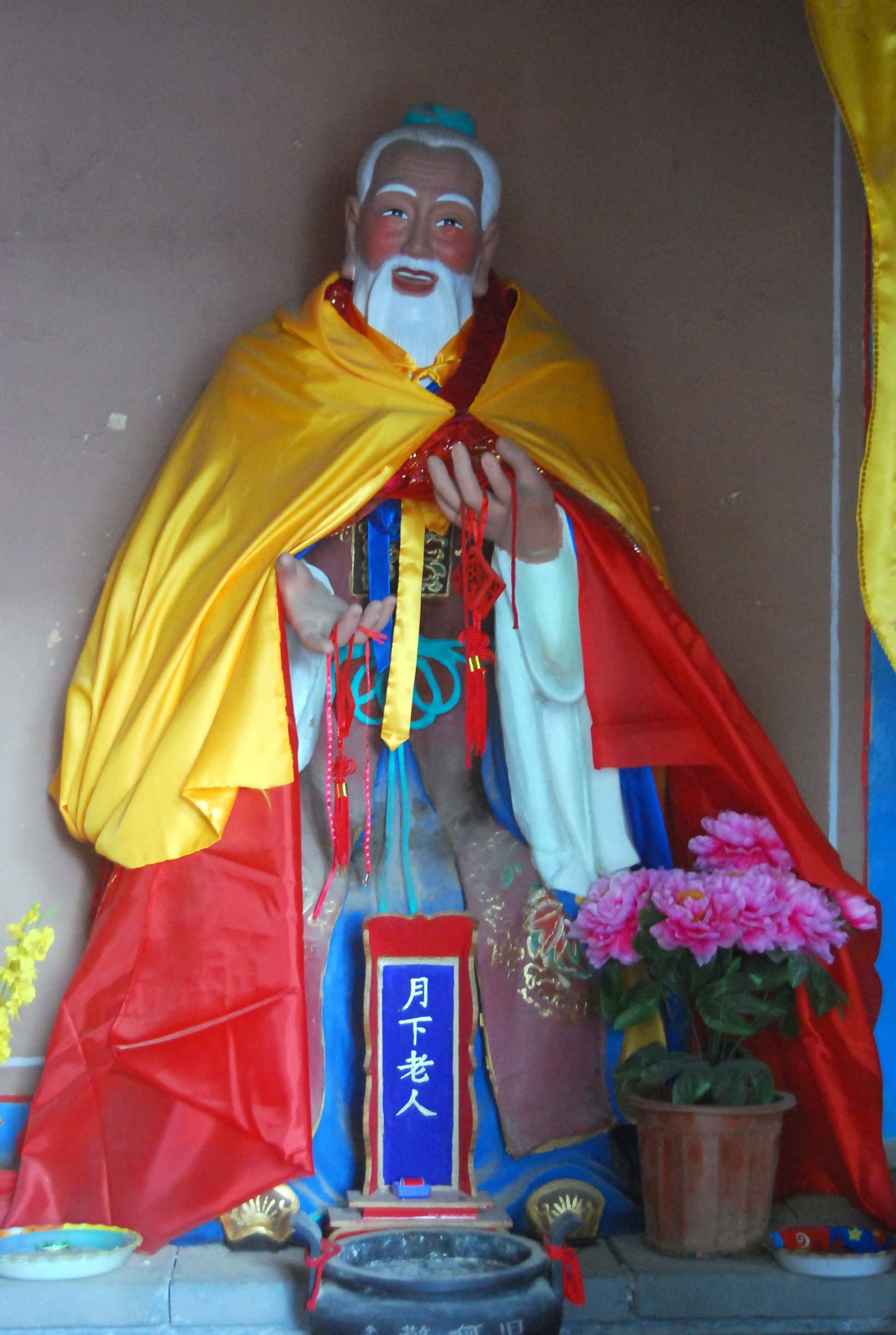
- Sculpture of Yue Lao
- Planet: Moon
- Symbols: Red strings
- Gender: Male

Yue Lao (Chinese: 月下老人; pinyin: Yuè Xià Lǎorén; lit. 'old man under the moon') is a god of marriage and love in Chinese mythology. He appears as an old man under the moon. Yue Lao appears at night and "unites with a silken cord all predestined couples, after which nothing can prevent their union." He is immortal and is said to live either in the moon or in the "obscure regions" (Yue ming), the Chinese equivalent of Hades. His legends serve as the basis for the Red thread of fate.

== Legend ==
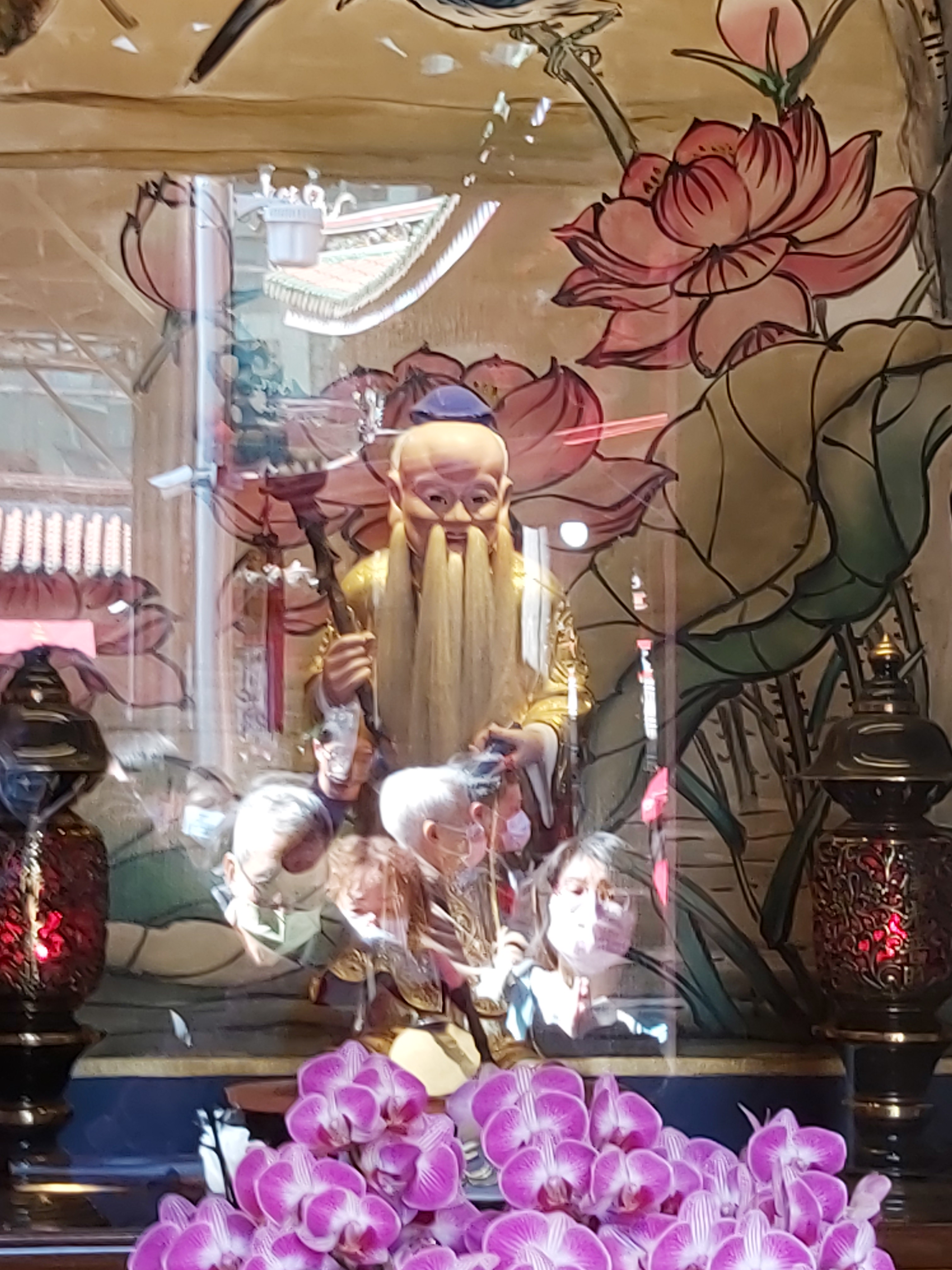
Statue of Yue Lao at Bangka Lungshan Temple.

A legend is told about the old man under the moon. During the Tang dynasty, there was a young man named Wei Gu (韋固; Wéi Gù). Once he was passing the city of Songcheng, where he saw an old man leaning on his pack reading a book in the moonlight. Amazed by this, Wei Gu walked up and asked what he was doing. The old man answered: "I am reading a book of marriage listing for who is going to marry whom. In my pack are red cords for tying the feet of husband and wife." When Wei Gu and the old man came together to a marketplace, they saw a blind old woman carrying a three-year-old little girl in her arms. The old man said to Wei Gu: "This little girl will be your wife in the future." Wei Gu thought this was too strange to believe and he ordered his servant to stab the girl with his knife.

Fourteen years later, Wang Tai, the governor of Xiangzhou, gave Wei Gu his daughter in marriage. He was having difficulty finding a suitable match of higher standing for his daughter for even though she was a beautiful young woman, she had difficulty walking and had a large scar on the small of her back. When Wei Gu asked what had happened, he was told that she had been stabbed by a man in the marketplace fourteen years before.

After ten years and three children later, Wei Gu sought the old man for suitable matches for his two younger sons and daughter. The old man refused to find suitors for his children. During the later years, Wei Gu sought to find a possible match for his children but by coincidence, no marriage was put to work.

== In fiction ==
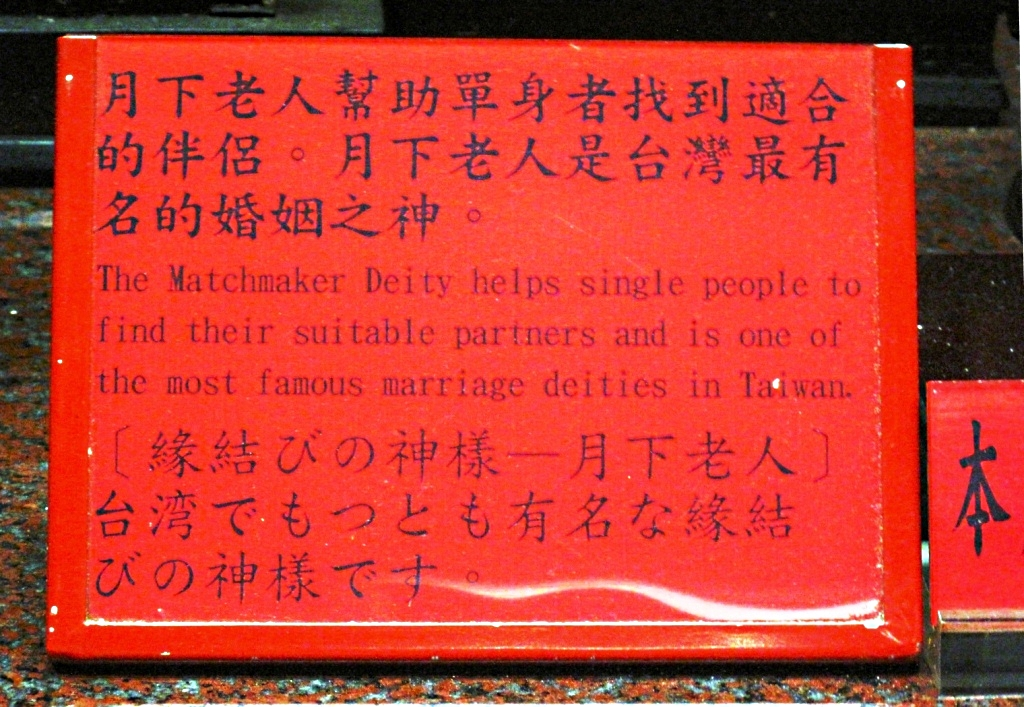
Yue Xia Laoren sign in Chinese, English, and Japanese. Taipei

Yue-Laou [sic] appears as a character in Robert W. Chambers' short story "The Maker of Moons" from the collection of the same name in 1896. He is the leader of Kuen-Yuin, a sect of Chinese sorcerers, and is called "Maker of Moons." He had corrupted "the Xin, the good genii of China" and transformed them into a monstrous composite being: "This monster is horrible, for it not only lives in its own body, but it has thousands of loathsome satellites—living creatures without mouths, blind, that move when the Xin moves, like a mandarin and his escort." In the story, it is revealed that he is the stepfather of Ysonde and is associated with the pack of gold makers. Although he is apparently killed, his body is never found.

The figure is also a major character in the TV series Ashes of Love. He is in charge of love and marriage of all mortal beings through the use of his red threads.

In Grace Lin's 2009 novel Where the Mountain Meets the Moon, a main character is named the “Old Man of the Moon” and seems to be heavily derived from Yue Lao and the story of Wei Gu.

Till We Meet Again (2021 film) is a Taiwanese romantic fantasy comedy film where the main character has to serve as a Yue Lao to meet the requirements for reincarnation as a human.

The 2022 mobile RPG Dislyte features a playable character based on Yue Lao. His abilities and attacks make use of a magical red cord inspired by the god's thread of fate. He is also in the fantasy novel Equal to Heaven as the mentor of the monkey king, Sun Wu Kong. His first scene is when Pigsy, the god of greed, finds him after fighting Ares, Ancient Greek god of war. On their return to the Jade Palace together, Sun Wu Kong is born and they look after him with the Germanic legendary figure, Fáfnir.

== See also ==
- Huayue Sanniang
