= Mariposa (fictional town) =

Fictional Canadian town created by Stephen Leacock

Mariposa is a fictional Canadian town created by Stephen Leacock as the setting for a series of short stories. Commissioned by The Montreal Star newspaper, they were later collected and published in one volume as Sunshine Sketches of a Little Town. Since then, many attempts have been made to expand the canon, present it in a different form or make reference to it.

Although the author publicly denied it, the town is closely modelled on the town of Orillia, Ontario, and its inhabitants. He named it after one or more nearby communities, which had borne versions of that name in real life, and have since disincorporated: Mariposa, Ontario, and Mariposa Beach. Leacock was a professor of political economy at McGill University in Montreal, Quebec, but he had a summer home at Old Brewery Bay. The names of the characters in the stories were altered to avoid potential libel lawsuits when the stories were published in book form in 1912.

Mariposa has been a subject of academic research in a number of fields, such as small town heritage preservation, and in literary studies of Leacock writings.

The remainder of this article will provide information on Mariposa in the form of a regular geographic entry as if it really existed, with references to the facts associated with the non-fictional models.

== Geography ==
Mariposa, Ontario, nicknamed Hull Town, is situated between Lake Ossawippi and Lake Wissanotti (modelled on Lake Couchiching and Lake Simcoe, although with features that radically depart from both). The Ossawippi River joins these two lakes, and the Lower Ossawippi River feeds into the northern end of Lake Wissanotti. The community is located on the Canadian Shield and hence the soil is rocky and supports mostly slow-growing evergreen trees.

Politically, Mariposa is located in Missinaba County (modelled on Simcoe County and possibly taking its name from the Missinaibi River near Chapleau, Ontario) which was surveyed in a grid pattern. The town is the metropolis of surrounding rural Tecumseh Township (modelled on Tecumseth Township in Simcoe County), from which it was created in the 19th century, and serves as the judicial district but not county seat. It is only one hundred miles north of the provincial metropolis (modelled on Toronto).

== Demographics ==
The official census conducted by the federal government lists a population of about five thousand, not counting outlying districts such as Tecumseh Corners, Nichols Corners, Third Concession and Fourth Concession. Other ordinarily reliable sources, including the local agent for the collection of Ontario's vital statistics and the town's two newspapers, estimate that the population is as high as nearly ten thousand.

The ethnic origins of most residents are from the British Isles, the descendants of whom have overwhelmed the indigenous Missinabi population. Major sources of in migration are the Maritime provinces, northern Ontario and Massachusetts. Major destinations of out migration, especially for educational and economic reasons, are the nearby provincial metropolis.

Mariposans follow diverse Christian denominations according to their ethnic origins, but the Anglicans are clearly most dominant, followed in no particular order by Presbyterians, Salvationists, Methodists and Roman Catholics. Mallory Thomkins of the Times-Herald newspaper is the only outspoken agnostic or atheist.

== Economy ==
There are several sectors of the economy, and each will be discussed in turn.

=== Primary industry and agriculture ===
Mariposa was attractive to its first inhabitants as a source of primary industries. Swampy areas near the Ossawippi River and nearby shallow reedy areas on Lake Wissanotti itself provided excellent homes for waterfowl and excellent killing grounds for duck hunters. Both fowl and human feasted on abundant bass, chub and the native maskinonge (piscis mariposis) fish.

The townsite was occupied by pine and hemlock woods and its reduced remains still ring the town. Choice hardwoods like elm and maple are south of Mariposa, while north of town are tamarack and willow. Although Mariposa is south of Spanish River lumber country, it still maintains a planing factory or sawmill on the lakeshore near the railway siding and every spring there is a huge influx of rough lumbermen.

In the immediate vicinity of Mariposa, there are some fair crop farms, but in the extremities of Tecumseh Township and Missinaba County, forbidding rocks, fetid swamps and dense forests of the north country of the Canadian or Laurentian Shield make the soil large scale cultivation of grains or fruits impractical. Livestock farming is somewhat more successful, and the Mariposa Packing Company is always kept busy.

=== Secondary industry, commerce and finance ===
Excluding the sawmill, there is very little industry in town, notably only the Mariposa Carriage Co. This may be partly explained by the erratic nature of the distribution of hydro-electric power generated by the dam on the Lower Ossiwipi River nineteen miles (31 km) north at the rapids.

Only on official occasions is the forty or so foot wide bustling downtown thoroughfare of Mariposa called by its proper name, Missinaba Street (after the county and based on Mississaga Street in Orillia), rather than Main Street. Among the many shops there are Pharmaceutical Hall (Jim Eliot's drug store), Pete Glover and Alf McNichol's co-located hardware and paint stores and Ed Moore's photo shop. Similarly, services downtown include lawyers, doctors, dentists, Jefferson "Jeff" Thorpe's barbershop and, when it is all over, Golgotha Gingham's funeral home.

Mariposa boasts two branches of major banks: the Commercial Bank (modelled on what is now the Canadian Imperial Bank of Commerce) and the Exchange Bank (modelled on what is now the National Bank of Canada). Robertson's Coal and Wood Office was divided to serve as Mariposa Mining Exchange during the investment boom in junior mining companies.

Thorpe earned 5312% profit after investing in Northern Star mine in northern Ontario. Trying to continue his financial success, he invested his profits in the Cuban Land Development Company whose corporate headquarters was a P.O. box in New York City. Unfortunately, police discovered this to be a fraud and Thorpe lost not only his own money but undertook to repay Mariposans whom he had helped to invest in the dubious scheme.

=== Tourism ===
In recent years, tourism has become the backbone of the town as city folk take the short train trip north. Town architecture is preserved and enhanced, mainly through the activity of hotelier Josh Smith who not only rebuilt and expanded his own property but also replaced the façade of the Anglican church.

Smith's hotel has long been a fixture of the town, and when he bought it around 1908. The hotel has borne many names both before and after his acquisition of it, in approximate order: the Royal Hotel, the Queen's Hotel, the Alexandria Hotel, Smith's Ladies’ and Gent's (sic) Café, Smith's Summer Pavilion, Smith's Tourists’ Emporium, Smith's Northern Health Resort, Smith's Northern Health Resort and Home of the Wissanotti Angler, and Smith's British Arms.

Clearly, Josh Smith dominates the hospitality industry, but visitors may also stay at the Continental Hotel, operated by Pete Robinson, or Mariposa House, containing a billiard room. There are also seven short-stay cottages located along Lake Wissanotti.

== Communications ==
Although it is a small town located in a rural county, Mariposa maintains close connections with the rest of Ontario, Canada and the world. The downtown post office, with Alf Trelawney as its postmaster, served impartially under Liberal government of Alexander Mackenzie as well as the Conservative government of John A. Macdonald.

The town took to advanced technology very early, having a telephone exchange staffed with four women operators in 1912. The telegraph office, operated by Billy Rawson, linked Mariposa by telegraph wires along Main Street to the nearby county seat (modelled on Barrie) and the provincial metropolis.

For such a small town, the fourth estate is amply represented by two widely read newspapers (modelled on the Orillia Packet-Times and the Owen Sound Sun-Times). The Mariposa Newspacket supports the Conservative Party and its editor wears his blue temperance ribbon of the Knights of Pythias. The Mariposa Times-Herald supports the Liberal Party and its editor published the famous partisan screed from Patriotus Canadiensis.

== Transportation ==
Mariposa has good transportation networks. Rail transit is provided by the transcontinental trains which roll through the town, usually at night. Unfortunately, scruffy miners and coiffed millionaires from the city rarely stop to offload or load. For that, one must board the Mariposa Local which links the town to the city one hundred miles to the south.

Once commercial travellers from the city arrive from the 6:30 a.m. express train, or before they wish to leave the Main Street hotel strip to catch the 5:30 p.m. train to the city, they take the hotel shuttle into downtown. Otherwise, there is no common carrier public transit in town so even bank employees use their feet or bicycles.

Since 1972, the stationary dining cars of the Ossawippi Express have served as a reminder of the area's proud railway history, and given residents and visitors a classy place to eat out.

Mariposa Belle was the name of its notoriously unseaworthy steamship which cruised at 4 mph (6.4 km/h). Its only scheduled departures from the wharf built by the federal government were for scenic cruises on May 24 and July 1 (that is, Victoria Day and Canada Day). Many locals and visitors took chartered day excursions twenty miles (32 km) north to Indian Island (modelled on Georgina Island Indian reserve on Lake Simcoe and Chiefs Island of the Rama Indian Reserve on Lake Couchiching) on Lake Wissanotti. Locals groups, including Knights of Pythias and Sons of Temperance, also take day trips to local option dry townships in Missinaba County.

In 1987, a new paddlewheeled cruise ship also called Mariposa Belle began operating in Toronto. In contrast to its namesake, conspicuous and considerable consumption of food and alcohol is the sole purpose of this ship.

== Government and services ==
Judicial oversight is provided by Judge Philip Pepperleigh, a staunch Conservative, has sat on the bench of the Mariposa Court House for years since emigrating from the Maritimes. Sometimes, it seems more like judicial oversight when he ignores the arguments of Macartney, the prosecuting (i.e., Crown) attorney. For example, Pepperleigh acquitted his own son for hitting a prominent Liberal and fined publican Josh Smith for not opening his bar after hours to accommodate His Honour.

The greatest threat to public safety is fire, so the volunteer fire brigade was organized by townsmen. Its lone fire engine is parked at the Fire Hall at the main intersection, and both are funded by proceeds of the Firemen's Ball held each winter.

The only other safety and health organizations in town are the marine life station on Lake Wissanotti and the Mariposa Hospital. The former's 14-man Mackinaw rescue boat was rescued by the Mariposa Belle when both sank. The latter's source of income is almost exclusively public subscription.

However, the greatest source of the threat to public safety proved to be Josh Smith, de facto chief of the volunteer fire department. Witnesses told detectives brought up from Toronto that they saw Smith in suspicious circumstances before a fire destroyed the debt-ridden Anglican church and that only later did he return to organize the fire fighting effort. Nonetheless, Judge Pepperleigh acquitted Smith of arson and insurance fraud.

Other minor officialdom is stabled at the county seat, where the License Commissioners grant or withdraw liquor licences based in part on the adherence to an 11 p.m. last call. Undertaker Golgotha Gingham doubles as the provincially appointed collector of vital statistics.

Public education is directed by the School Board which operates several primary schools in the township (e.g., Tecumseh Corners School House and Concession School House) and one high school. Mariposa High School offers a full spectrum of instruction including English literature, drama, music and biology. The Mariposa Mechanics’ Institute, blessed with Gallagher collection donated by one of the town's most learned men, provides adults with opportunities for self-education and continuing education.

== Politics ==
Municipal politics are normally sedate, with several leading members of the council and community such as businessman Pete Glover taking turns annually as mayor. The only incumbent known outside the town was Harry J. Boyle, concurrently the chairman of the CBC in 1967. The only moderately controversial feature of municipal politics is the local option on Prohibition, which even temperance organizations sometimes find inconvenient.

However, normally staid federal politics become very important and divisive at election time. Religious solidarity is torn apart. The Rev. Mr. Rupert Drone, the Anglican priest, preaches the Conservative message from his pulpit despite the fact his brother Edward Drone ran as an Independent on an anti-corruption platform. Likewise the Presbyterian minister supports the Conservative Party regardless of the fact that twenty-year veteran Liberal MP John Henry Bagshaw is a co-religionist and is seen as a supporter of that community.

Professional solidarity is also rent asunder, as Judge Pepperleigh is a Conservative, Dr. Gallagher is a Liberal and Dr. Joe Milligan is a Conservative. Business solidarity is also rather tenuous. The Continental Hotel is used as Conservative election headquarters while Mariposa House is used by the Liberals. Prior to the 1911 election, Josh Smith maintained his hotel as a politically multi-partisan (or Independent-Liberal-Conservative-Imperialist) place.

After Smith won his liquor license back, he gained political favour by operating the best hotel in town and donating $100 to each of the established political parties, the Mariposa Hospital and other worthy charities. He paid the touring amusement ride operator enough cash so that all children could ride for free that day.

Based on his growing popularity, Smith unexpectedly became the conservative candidate in the federal election of 1911. The main election issues were reciprocity and Naval Service, but Smith deftly sat on the fence on these issues. He deftly deflected all the mud the incumbent MP slung his way, and through deft manipulation of the mob mentality and telecommunications Smith achieved an electoral upset by defeating Bagshaw. He was, however, silent in victory.

== Culture and entertainment ==
Culture and entertainment are intimately entwined in Mariposa. They are organized mainly along religious denominational lines but also in secular fraternal and civic societies, so these two components will be treated separately.

=== Religious culture and entertainment ===
The dominant religion is Anglicanism, and the Church of England Church (as it is locally known) is the venue for most Anglican pastimes Its programs include the Mother's Auxiliary, the Girls Auxiliary, the Infants School, the Book Club, the Bible Study Class, a choir, and Willing Workers of the Church of England and its youth wing the Early Workers’ Guild.

Dean Drone has served the church since about 1870, but his financial acumen is dubious. When he tore down the original stone church and erected a wooden replacement, the debt crushed the congregation. The Whirlwind Campaign designed to retire debt achieved only 0.04% of its ambitious $250,000 goal. The lay leadership including Gingham, Nivens and Mullins forced Drone to accept a curate to take over most of his duties, except the Infants School.

Protestants are also active on the Mariposa cultural and religious scene. The Salvation Army conducts its street ministry at the main intersection downtown, and solicits funds as Smith's Hotel even though it is the watering hole in town. The Methodist Social has poetry readings, and the Presbyterian Church will even accept Anglicans like Zena Pepperleigh, the district judge's daughter, as curious visitors to its divine services.

Roman Catholics understandably keep a low profile in town, since every July 12 the Orangemen's Parade is celebrated by Mariposans with flourish. St. Patrick's Day, St. Andrew's Day, St. George's Day, Independence Day and July 1 are also popularly celebrated. Despite the overt activity of the Orangemen, Catholics hold an annual summer picnic at which the Salvation Army band plays. Anglicans are also known to drop in on Catholic masses, but only in the city where their attendance is anonymous and will not lead to social complications.

== Secular culture and entertainment ==
In addition to overt or primarily religious organizations operating directly as part of the diverse Christian denominations of Mariposa, there are many secular or ecumenical organizations the civic-minded resident may join. The Young Men's Christian Association offers a physical and spiritual outlet for Mariposians, especially those like bank clerk Peter Pupkin who moved to the town from away.

Organized amateur sports are very popular in Mariposa. One may join the Ball Club, Lacrosse Club, Curling Club, Mariposa Canoe Club, Snow Shoe Club, and the Mariposa Tennis Club (behind Dr. Gallagher's house). Foot races are organized on Indian Island during Mariposa Belle excursions. Sleigh riding, sport fishing and duck hunting are also very popular solitary or small group pastimes.

Music and dancing are incorporated into many secular activities, since these are often very circumscribed if not outright banned in a religious environment (except for the Salvation Army, which makes music a central part of its ministry). The uniformed town band, with at least ten members, plays its coronets every Wednesday in the municipal park. The Mariposa Quartette, the Oddfellows’ Brass Band and the Knights of Pythias band are also active. The fundraising Firemen's Ball is the highlight of the winter social season, eclipsing even the Oyster Supper of Knights of Pythias.

The usual fraternal societies were active in the town: Freemasons, Oddfellows, Foresters. More regional or local cross-denominational or secular organizations are: Knights of Pythias (which has Dean Drone as chaplain), Sons of Temperance (whose members sometimes stray) and The Girls’ Friendly Society (since they are barred from the Pythians).

== References and external links ==
- Andrew, Allan. (prod.) “Sunshine Sketches of a Little Town,” Stage 47. December 1, 1946. Canadian Broadcasting Corporation (CBC), Toronto.
- Ferris, Ina. ”The Face in the Window: Sunshine Sketches Reconsidered," Studies in Canadian Literature. 1978. University of New Brunswick, Fredericton.
- Katz, Stephen. (Prod. and dir.) "The Great Mariposa Train Robbery," Morningside. March 17, 1989. CBC, Toronto.
- Leacock, Stephen. Sunshine Sketches of a Little Town. Ms. Library and Archives Canada still images and compendia.
- Leacock, Stephen. Sunshine Sketches of a Little Town. 1912. Bell and Cockburn, Toronto. Republished various times, among them ISBN 0-7710-9984-3, ISBN 1-896133-34-7, ISBN 1-55111-178-0 and ISBN 1-894003-20-9.
- Leacock, Stephen. Sunshine Sketches of a Little Town. Gutenberg Project electronic version
- Leacock, Stephen. ‘’Sunshine Sketches of a Little Town." LiteratureClassics.com electronic version
- Legate, David M. Stephen Leacock: A Biography. 1970. Doubleday, Toronto. Especially pp. 61–64.
- Ossawippi Express. 1972-. Railway car restaurant, Orillia.
- Packet & Times. 1874-. Newspaper, Orillia.
- Rae, Johnny. (Prod.) "The Hero of Mariposa," CBC Wednesday Night. March 31, 1954. CBC, Toronto.
- Tweed, Tommy. (Prod.) "The Great Election," CBC Wednesday Night. March 9, 1949. CBC, Toronto.
- Tweed, Tommy. (Prod.) "The Hostelry of Mr. Smith," CBC Wednesday Night. Nov. 30, 1949. CBC, Toronto.
