= The Three Musketeers in Africa =

1940 literary work by Jenő Rejtő

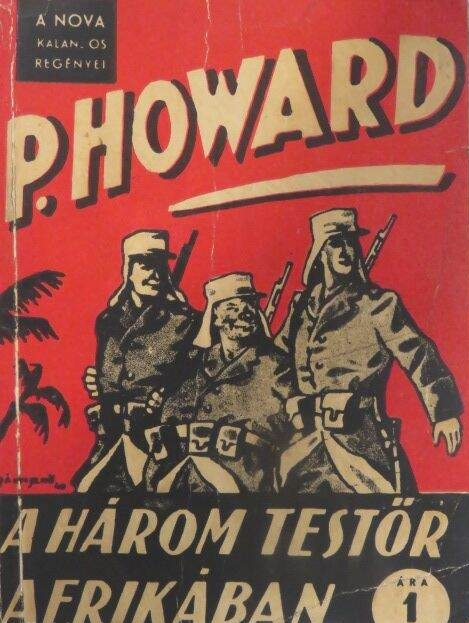
- Front page of the first edition of The Three Musketeers in Africa , 1940 (Hungarian)
- Author: Jenő Rejtő
- Original title: A három testőr Afrikában
- Translator: Márton Hübler
- Cover artist: Jenő Pályi
- Language: Hungarian, with some French expressions
- Series: Foreign Legion novels
- Genre: Novel (Adventure novel)
- Publisher: Nova Irodalmi Intézet
- Publication date: 1940
- Publication place: Hungary
- Media type: Print
- Pages: 176 (first published edition)
- ISBN: 979-8339444305
- Preceded by: The Cursed Shore

The Three Musketeers in Africa is a novel written by a Hungarian novelist Jenő Rejtő under the pen name of P. Howard. It continues the adventures of Csülök (Knuckles), Senki Alfonz (Alfons Nobody) and Tuskó Hopkins (Blockhead Hopkins), three legionaries of the French Foreign Legion who were the protagonists of Rejtő's 1940 book The Cursed Shore. The three have to deliver an important letter to Colonial Commissioner Marquis De Surenne through jungle and desert and protect a young lady and lead her to safety. The book continues both the theme of Rejtő's novels of outlaws with a heart of gold, as well as the unique situational humour and wordplay of Jenő Rejtő's "Dirty Fred" novels".

== Plot summary ==
The three legionaries Csülök, Senki Alfonz and Tuskó Hopkins are stationed at the fortress of Oasis Rakhmar. Hopkins, who serves under a fake identity due to having stolen a uniform, receives a letter from a young lady named Yvonne Barré addressed to the owner of his uniform. She is in search for her brother, Francis Barre. The three legionaries find out that Francis is at the worst penal garrison of the Foreign Legion, Igori. They want to help Yvonne, so each of the three commit some transgression to be punished by being garrisoned for duty in Igori. There they face a big surprise as the discipline camp resembles a holiday resort. After they meet Yvonne, her dying brother Francis Barre and their father General Duron, the General tries to unveil the underlying fraud in a letter directly to the French leadership without going through the military chain of command that might risk publicity and national embarrassment. The three legionaries and Yvonne escape from the camp, carrying the letter to Marquis De Surenne through the Congo jungle and the Sahara desert.

== Adaptations ==
- Film: The book was adapted into feature film in 1996 by director István Bujtor. The movie received the prize of Hungarian Cinemas (Moziüzemeltetők díja) for the "largest domestic audience" in 1997.
- English translation: The book was translated into English in 2024: ISBN 979-8339444305

== Original text ==
As the author's original work has entered the public domain 70 years after his death, the Hungarian text and scans of the first edition is available on the archive website of the National Széchényi Library, Hungary's national library.
