= Red thread of fate =

Chinese folk belief

- A statue of Yuexia Laoren holding a red thread

Chinese name
- Traditional Chinese: 紅線
- Simplified Chinese: 红线
Transcriptions
Standard Mandarin
- Hanyu Pinyin: hóngxiàn
Yue: Cantonese
- Yale Romanization: hung^{4}sin^{3}
Southern Min
- Hokkien POJ: âng-sòaⁿ

Vietnamese name
- Vietnamese alphabet: hồng tuyến tơ hồng
- Chữ Hán: 紅線 絲紅

Korean name
- Hangul: 홍실 청실홍실

Japanese name
- Kanji: 赤い糸 運命の赤い糸
Transcriptions
- Romanization: akai ito unmei no akai ito

The red thread (Chinese: 紅線; pinyin: hóngxiàn) is a motif, derived from Chinese folklore, that symbolizes the belief that certain people will meet and are connected by fate.

The Taoist deity in charge of "the red thread" is Yuexia Laoren (Old Man under the Moon), who is in charge of marriages. While Yuexia Laoren remains an important deity in Taoism, the legend of his red thread of fate has been appropriated by cultures outside of China, often losing its religious context and association with him. In the original Chinese myth, the thread is tied around both parties' ankles, while in Japanese culture it is bound from a male's thumb to a female's little finger. In modern times, though, it is common across both these cultures to depict the thread being tied around the fingers, often the little finger.

== Folklore ==
In Chinese folklore, Yuexia Laoren (Old Man under the Moon), who acts as a matchmaker, arranges marriages by tying a red thread between individuals at the moment of their births. This has inspired many folktales.

A proverb from the Tang dynasty (618–907) states "feet linked by red cords" (红绳系足), which alludes to the tale of Yuexia Laoren tying a red thread between the feet of those meant to become a couple together.

== Popular culture ==
Within the transnational adoption community, specifically among parents who have adopted children from China, the red thread was adapted from Chinese folklore to serve as a link between adoptive parents and adopted childeren in narratives.

In Phantom Blade Zero, a 2026 wuxia action role-playing game, the red thread metaphorically represents the entanglements of love and hatred, the bonds of fate, and the interpersonal ties in the jianghu.

== Gallery ==
Statues showing Yuexia Laoren connecting two people with a red thread

== See also ==
- Red string (Kabbalah)
- Silver cord
- Yuanfen
