= Dirty Fred =

Dirty Fred (or as Jimmy Ears refers to him: Dirty Alfred) is a comic character created by Hungarian author Jenő Rejtő (writing under the pseudonym P. Howard), and is the titular protagonist in several of Rejtő's most famous pulp novels.

Dirty Fred features (in order of writing) in the novels "The Lost Cruiser", "Dirty Fred, the Captain", "Dirty Fred intervenes (to Jimmy Ears' Sincere Regret)" and "The Found Cruiser". These novels have reached enormous popularity in Hungary after the author's death - including adaptations into radio dramas, plays, graphic novels and a board game - and Dirty Fred himself has become a well-known cultural touch stone, having had restaurants, songs and rock bands named after him.

== Description ==
Dirty Fred is around fifty years old, with a long, dirty, coffee-colored, unkempt beard, and black-rimmed eagle talons. His skin is tanned and wrinkled, with small, cunning, glittering eyes. On his face are several round, large warts, a characteristic hawk-like nose, and a downturned, wide mouth. His messy, grayish-white hair hangs over his forehead. He could only be forced to bathe under life-threatening circumstances, and his sun-tanned face guarded the date of his last wash like a great mystery. The humor of his character stems from the fact that, in line with his name, he is dirty, neglected, taciturn and grumpy like a sailor, yet thanks to his sharp mind and extensive network of acquaintances, he is surprisingly able to arrange many situations to his liking. A characteristic move to assert his will is to announce plans to do the opposite of his actual intention, and let others who want to spite him play into his hand. One of his constant partners, yet also his adversary, is Jimmy Ears, who once described him thus: "He has the most brains in the world. He's stingy, cruel, grumpy, and stops at nothing when it comes to money. He cheats everyone, profits from everything, befriends no one, roams the world alone, and as his name suggests, he's completely dirty." And "...only three things interest him: money and nothing else, plus screwing me over." His personality, however, is not devoid of mysterious lyricism: "from the time of his bygone youth, they say, archaic, gentlemanly sorrows rested as mysterious, frozen fossils."

== Life ==
Fred was born as Wilbour Theodor. He was once a frigate captain of an unspecified ship in the Royal Navy but on one occasion he committed several murders and had to leave his service. At some point he married Helena, queen of the Bliss Islands and later Queen Mother and fathered the Grand Duke St. Antonio, later King of the Bliss Islands of Happiness. He and the queen keep this as a secret. Afterward, he smuggled ammunition to China on a 'shabby little steamer' and brought drugs back to Greece. He founded a bank in Port Said with Mr. Wagner, and on another occasion, he created a joint-stock company with the participation of the Surgeon, Rusty, the Kid, Bunkó, and Morbitzer, and he became the managing director. In a moment of distress, he stole the cruiser Balmoral - which he later renamed Radzeer based on Rusty's idea - but due to his useful services, he was forgiven and even allowed to keep the cruiser. For a while, he peacefully sailed the seas with his comrades, but since Dirty Fred was a tyrant and constantly embezzled from the ship's expenses, a mutiny broke out, and the captain was slapped on a stormy night at the height of the Cape of Good Hope, after dramatic preliminaries. Later, he was allegedly seen in Alaska, where he opened a gambling den, and the gold diggers seriously considered lynching him. Once there was a rumor that he had died, but it later turned out that he was the captain of that shabby little steamer that rushed to the aid of the luxury steamer Tokio-Maru, which had run aground in a raging storm, and saved fifty passengers. They later noticed that all their valuables had disappeared. He occasionally appears in Canton, Trieste, or Rio de Janeiro.

== Dirty Fred Novels ==
- The Lost Cruiser (Az elveszett cirkáló)
  - First edition: Nova Irodalmi Intézet, 1938 (byline: 'P. Howard, translated by Jenő Rejtő')
  - English translations: Henrietta Whitlock 2014; Márton Hübler 2024 (ISBN 979-8329023350)
  - Radio play adaptation: Kossuth Rádió Rádiószínház, 2015, directed by Péter Vida
  - Comic book adaptation:
    - Sándor Kovács, Tolna megyei Népújság, 1964
    - Tibor Horváth and Pál Korcsmáros, Lobogó 1968
  - Audiobook: Kossuth–Mojzer, 2007 (narrator Gyula Bodrogi); Hungaroton, 2019 (narrator: András Kern)
  - Hungarian edition available at: The Lost Cruiser
- Dirty Fred, the Captain (Piszkos Fred, a kapitány)
  - First edition: Nova Irodalmi Intézet, 1940 (as: 'P. Howard')
  - English translations: Henrietta Whitlock 2015; Márton Hübler 2024 (ISBN 979-8329346626)
  - Radio play adaptations:
    - 2001: 15 part radio play directed by Tibor Csizmadia;
    - Kossuth Rádió Rádiószínház, 2017: 10 part radio play directed by Péter Vida
  - Comic book adaptation: Tibor Horváth and Pál Korcsmáros, Füles magazine, 1964
  - Audiobook: Kossuth–Mojzer, 2006 (narrator Gyula Bodrogi); Hungaroton, 2017 (narrator: András Kern)
  - Hungarian edition available at: Dirty Fred, the Captain
- Dirty Fred intervenes to Jimmy Ears' sincere regret (Piszkos Fred közbelép Fülig Jimmy öszinte sajnálatára)
  - First edition: Aurora Könyvkiadó Vállalat, 1941 (as: 'P. Howard')
  - English translation: Márton Hübler 2024 (ISBN 979-8329351095)
  - Radio play adaptation: Kossuth Rádió Rádiószínház, 2018: 16 part radio play directed by Péter Vida
  - Comic book adaptation: Tibor Horváth and Pál Korcsmáros, Füles magazine, 1973
  - Audiobook: Kossuth-Mojzer, 2017, narrated by Péter Rudolf
  - Hungarian edition available at: Dirty Fred Intervenes (Much to Fülig Jimmy's Sincere Regret)
- The Found Cruiser (A megkerült cirkáló)
  - First edition: Soóky Könyvkiadó, 1943 (posthumous, as: 'P. Howard')
  - English translation: Henrietta Whitlock 2015; Márton Hübler 2024 (ISBN 979-8329387773)
  - Comic book adaptation: Horváth Tibor and Halasi Éva, Füles magazine, 1983
  - Audiobook: Kossuth-Mojzer, 2011, narrated by Péter Rudolf
  - Hungarian edition available at: The Recovered Cruiser

== Adaptations ==
On the Hungarian stage:

- 1968-10-05: Egyetemi Színpad Budapest, Universitas ensemble, Imre Katona/Péter Vágó, dir TamásFodor : Dirty Fred Drinks Raspberry Squash and Stirs it to Jimmy Ears' Sincere Regret (Piszkos Fred málnaszőrt iszik és kavarja Fülig Jimmy őszinte sajnálatára, musical comedy in two parts)
- 2007-03-08: Wágner és Vatta Kabarészínház, dir. Ákos Barnóczky: Dirty Fred, the Captain (stage play)
- 2014-06-06: Városmajori Szabadtéri Színpad Budapest, dir. Katalin–Lázár Vajda György Vilmos–Baráthy: Dirty Fred, the Captain (musical in two parts)

As a board game:

- Based on the book "Dirty Fred, the Captain" Zoltán Aczél and Péter Árvai created a board game, published by Gém Klub Kft. The players attempt to form majorities in four bars and among the family members of the three protagonists, partly to obtain "gangster cards", partly to gain influence with the three protagonists . Then this all is used to get maximum influence in the ensuing brawl among gangs - where 'dirty tricks' can be used as well.

== Popularity ==
- The 2005 survey "A Nagy Könyv" (The Big Book) of 400, 000 voters keretében had Dirty Fred The Captain as the 37th most popular book amongst Hungarians (and the 18th most popular book by Hungarian authors)
- The 2017 survey "A nemzet könyve" (Book of the Nation), had Dirty Fred The Captain came 7th overall.

== In the press and popular consciousness over the years ==
A selection of press passages highlights how the concept of Dirty Fred as a pulp novel anti-hero and Dirty Fred as the archetype of a true cosmopolitan dweller of ports around the world, permeated and permeates Hungarian public consciousness through the years:

- 1953: Rejtő' "Dirty Fred" was being used as an example of crude pre-war "low culture" contrasted against communist Hungary's new and 'more beautiful' culture at the zenith of the Rákosi era:
  - "It's worth considering that while before the liberation, the workers of the gentlemen's country, thrown into complete material and spiritual misery, could at best have 'Dirty Fred' and other pulp fiction as 'bestsellers', today in the people's country, workers' cultural demands are increasingly growing towards the noblest, most beautiful artistic experiences."
- 1959: Goethe's Werther and Rejtő's Dirty Fred contrasted in Hungarian press, with the latter highlighted as a quintessential coarse working man's novel:
  - "I read in Népszava that with a new Hungarian patent, renovations can be done without a forest of scaffolding. (...) I think Goethe's young Werther would have been less enthusiastic about the forest if he had once walked in a scaffolding forest; and I shudder at the thought of what this sensitive-hearted, refined young man would have said if his famous yellow trousers and blue tailcoat had been splashed with mortar. (...) I'm afraid the whole work's tone and character would have been different, rougher and more masculine, less sentimental; perhaps its title would have been 'Dirty Fred, the Captain'."
- 2014: Dirty Fred as cultural starting point for Hungarians' knowledge about Singapore and other British colonial port cities; see below the beginning paragraph to a cultural sociological study by László Harangi (1929–2015):
  - "Jenő Rejtő's Dirty Fred was a mythical figure of Singapore's underworld, a member of the 'Diligent Mummies' club, as the port city had for many long centuries assisted shipping towards China in the British colonial empire as a smoky transit station full of sailors' taverns. His mysterious life, often intertwined with the Eastern underworld, ended with independence in 1965, and today it's hardly imaginable that in place of the littered streets and pile dwellings of barely 60 years ago, there now stand skyscrapers of international business companies and the most powerful banks, and the city is networked with modern boulevards, luxurious department stores, and parks resplendent in all the beauty of the tropics."

== Cultural references ==
As a cultural icon, Dirty Fred has had songs, bands, pubs and restaurants named after him, and has been the subject of art pieces:

- "Piszkos Fred", a song by folk metal band Kárpátia
- The "Piszkos Freddy" acoustic ensemble in Debrecen
- "Piszkos Fred Steak House" in Cegléd
- "Korcsma Piszkos Fredhez", Restaurant in Budapest Erzsébetváros (closed down 2020)
- Dirty Fred sculpture in Szeged: A luminous mobile Dirty Fred sculpture by Ferenc Levente Dobó, a visual artist from Szeged, designed for selfie-taking. The creation, made within the framework of the PanoptikumArt workshop, can be disassembled, is easily transportable, and through its built-in electronics, its light and shadow play allows for playfulness that goes beyond the basic character of the sculpted figure.

== Literature ==
Rejtő Lexicon. Budapest, Quattrocento Publishing, 2012 ISBN 9786155262043
