= List of Trixie Belden books =

Trixie Belden
- Author: Julie Campbell Tatham
- Language: English
- Genre: Mystery fiction
- Publisher: Western Publishing
- Published: 1948

Trixie Belden is a series of 'girl detective' mysteries written between 1948 and 1986. The first six books were written by Julie Campbell Tatham. The following 33 titles were written by various in-house writers of Western Publishing under the pseudonym Kathryn Kenny. Between 2003 and 2006, Random House republished the first fifteen books of the series with new cover art illustrated by pulp artist Michael Koelsch. There has been no news of Random House publishing the remaining 24 books.

== Original six written by Julie Campbell Tatham ==
1. The Secret of the Mansion (1948)

The book opens with thirteen-year-old Trixie begging her mother for a horse. Her two older brothers are away at camp for the summer, and Trixie is afraid she will be bored at their house, Crabapple Farm. The family cannot afford a horse, so Trixie is told she will have to save her money to buy one. She then sees a horse trailer outside a neighboring mansion. The Wheelers, a rich family from New York City, have just bought the mansion and are moving in with their teenaged daughter, Honey. Although tough Trixie thinks Honey is a sissy at first, they soon become fast friends. Trixie realizes that Honey is really a "poor little rich girl", her parents are never home, she has been very sickly, and she grew up at boarding schools, at camps, and with governesses. Trixie helps her new friend overcome these problems, while Honey balances Trixie's rash and impatient personality with her tactfulness and gentleness.

Recently, Trixie's neighbor on the other side was taken to the hospital with pneumonia. Trixie uses this chance to explore around the miser's rundown old mansion. Under the pretense of locking a window, Trixie and Honey climb inside to look around. They are shocked to find a tall, redheaded boy asleep on a mattress. The boy is Jim Frayne, the miser's 15-year-old great-nephew, who is running away from his abusive stepfather. The three become close friends, with the girls smuggling food to the mansion for Jim. Local legend says the old man hid his fortune in the house, electing to live in poverty after his beloved wife’s death. Honey and Jim are doubtful, but Trixie is sure the money is there somewhere if only they can find it before Jim's evil stepfather comes looking for him.

Eventually, Jonesy, the stepfather, does come after a newspaper article about an airplane crashing near the miser's mansion also features the news of the miser's death, the legend of the fortune, and a photo of a fireplace with Jim's silver christening mug on the mantle. Trixie finds the engagement ring that Jim's great-uncle gave his wife in a safe.

After Jonesy shows up, Trixie wakes up in the middle of the night and sees smoke from her window. The girls call the fire department and go to warn Jim. The mansion is burned almost to the ground, and Jim sleeps in the hidden summerhouse. When Trixie and Honey go there to the next morning to visit him, they find him gone and a note with the engagement ring in the summerhouse saying goodbye. He has run away again, this time in possession of some money he found hidden in the mattress he had been sleeping on.

The girls meet the great-uncle's lawyer, Mr. Rainsford, who tells them Jim's uncle set up a half-million dollar trust for him and that Jonesy will be replaced as the boy's guardian. He asks them to track Jim down.

2. The Red Trailer Mystery (1950)

Jim Frayne ran away at the end of The Secret of the Mansion, but later his great-uncle's lawyer showed up, revealing that Jim inherited half a million dollars and is going to be removed from his abusive stepfather's custody. Trixie and Honey set off in the Wheelers' trailer with Honey's governess Miss Trask to find their missing friend. They decide to check the boys' camps upstate since Jim mentioned getting a job there, but he always seems to be one step ahead of them.

On the trip, Trixie and Honey are faced with a strange and poor family in a luxurious trailer; the family's missing daughter; Mrs. Smith, a fat and motherly woman who's missing her locket; a trailer-robbing ring; and two suspicious workers at their trailer camp who may be involved. Trixie knows that the mysteries are tied together and the answer lies in the nearby forest.

At the end of the book, Honey's parents return. Honey runs to her mother and gives her a hug, something she has never done before. Her mother forgets her own shyness and hugs her daughter back. Jim is adopted by the Wheeler family, giving Honey an older brother. Jim tells Trixie that he is in charge now, but Trixie tells him to wait for her older brothers, Mart and Brian, to get back from camp.

3. The Gatehouse Mystery (1951).

The Gatehouse Mystery marks a point in the series when the hallmarks of the Trixie Belden books are solidly established. This book introduces Trixie's older brothers and marks the establishment of the "Bob-Whites of the Glen" club. The plot involves an adventure that follows when Trixie and Honey explore an old, abandoned gatehouse on the Wheelers' property which is to become their clubhouse.

4. The Mysterious Visitor (1954)

This book marks the entry of Diana (Di) Lynch and a man staying with her family who may or may not be her long-lost uncle. The end of this book foreshadows events that occur in The Mystery in Arizona.

5. The Mystery Off Glen Road (1956)

When the clubhouse is badly damaged, Brian uses the money he has been saving to buy a jalopy in order to purchase repair materials. To help him keep the car, Trixie wants to use the ring Jim gave her in the first volume as collateral. She also plans to get the Bob-Whites hired as temporary gamekeepers for Mr. Wheeler so that they can raise enough money to pay for the car. While they are patrolling, they come across the path of a mysterious poacher.

6. The Mystery in Arizona (1958)

Trixie, while at Di's "real" uncle's ranch, tries to find out what happened to Uncle Monty's employees when they mysteriously disappear.

== Books written under the pseudonym Kathryn Kenny ==
7. The Mysterious Code (1961)

After the school district cracks down on secret clubs, Trixie and the other Bob-Whites put on an antique show to prove their worth. While collecting antiques, Trixie is robbed by thieves and finds a mysterious code in Honey's house. In the midst of this, romance blooms between Jim Frayne and Trixie Belden.

8. The Black Jacket Mystery (1961)

In The Black Jacket Mystery, a boy named Dan Mangan starts school in Sleepyside and lives with and works for Mr. Maypenny. Dan wears a black jacket that has a name on the back that has been painted over. Trixie is suspicious that Dan is a member of a gang and that he is up to no good.

9. The Happy Valley Mystery (1962)

In The Happy Valley Mystery, the Bob-Whites stay with the Beldens' Uncle Andrew on his sheep farm in Iowa. When Trixie learns that Uncle Andrew's sheep are being stolen by thieves, she is immediately on the hunt for the culprits. Trixie keeps accusing the wrong people of being thieves based only on how suspicious she thinks they look. All of the adults laugh at Trixie's exploits as she vows to solve the mystery.

10. The Marshland Mystery (1962)

Trixie wants to replace Miss Bennett's herb collection, which was destroyed by a clumsy student. Brian gives Trixie directions to Martin's Marsh. During the outing, Trixie and Honey meet Miss Rachel, who is the last of the Martins. Meanwhile, a child prodigy named Gaye is staying with the Wheelers. Gaye will be playing in a recital and has to practice constantly. Gaye is a snobbish young girl, and she is also very unhappy. Gaye also goes out to the marsh, and Gaye's adventure leads to complications for Miss Rachel, who may end up losing her home.

11. The Mystery at Bob-White Cave (1963)

In The Mystery at Bob-White Cave, the Bob-Whites stay in the Ozarks with the Beldens' Uncle Andrew. Trixie sees an article that advertises a $500 reward for the first person who can provide specimens of ghost fish in each of three different stages of evolution. Trixie is obsessed, so Uncle Andrew purchases the necessary equipment, and the Bob-Whites begin exploring the nearby caves.

12. The Mystery of the Blinking Eye (1963)

In The Mystery of the Blinking Eye, the Bob-Whites have a vacation in New York City with their friends from Iowa. Trixie helps a woman at the airport, and the woman writes a strange verse in Spanish. Miss Trask translates the verse, which strangely rhymes in English. Trixie is soon convinced that the verse predicts the future, and all of the Bob-Whites' New York adventures follow the verse as strange men follow them around and try to steal Trixie's purse.

13. The Mystery on Cobbett's Island (1964)

In The Mystery on Cobbett's Island, the Bob-Whites stay on Cobbett's Island in a home rented by the Wheelers. Trixie finds an old letter in a book, and the letter indicates that following the directions in a sailing game will lead to some money that has been hidden on the island. Trixie unearths several clues which reveal who the rightful owner of the money is, and that person could well use it. The Bob-Whites hope that they can find the money and bring happiness to others.

14. The Mystery of the Emeralds (1965)

In The Mystery of the Emeralds, Trixie discovers a hidden room in the attic at Crabapple Farm. In an article of clothing, she discovers a letter. Some excellent sleuthing leads to an elderly woman who lets Trixie and Honey read some diaries. The girls discover that the letter is a clue to hidden emeralds on an estate near Williamsburg. Fortunately, the Bob-Whites are able to travel with the Lynches to Williamsburg so that they can pursue the quest.

15. The Mystery on the Mississippi (1965)

In The Mystery on the Mississippi, the Bob-Whites travel to St. Louis, where Trixie discovers a mystery immediately. Trixie finds papers in the wastebasket of her motel room. Later, she learns that a man was looking for some papers, but she keeps them. This starts a sequence of events where three people stay in constant pursuit of the Bob-Whites and try to kill Trixie. Even when the authorities learn about the case and warn Trixie away from it, she continues her investigation with no thought for her own safety.

16. The Mystery of the Missing Heiress (1970)

Jim discovers that he has a cousin, Juliana, who will inherit $150,000 from the sale of some land on the Hudson River. When Juliana arrives, she is a bit distant and wants to close the sale of the land as quickly as possible. Meanwhile, a girl was struck by an automobile on Glen Road. The girl has amnesia, and everyone calls her Janie. The Beldens have Janie come home to stay with them, and Trixie tries to figure out who Janie really is.

17. The Mystery of the Uninvited Guest (1977)

In The Mystery of the Uninvited Guest, Trixie's cousin, Hallie, comes to visit, and Trixie is furious. Trixie and Hallie have never gotten along, and Trixie takes offense at everything Hallie does. Meanwhile, Bobby acts strangely, talking about a wheelchair that only he saw on Glen Road, and food keeps disappearing out of the Beldens' kitchen. As Trixie tries to puzzle out the mysterious events, she helps the Wheelers plan the wedding of Jim's cousin, Juliana.

18. The Mystery of the Phantom Grasshopper (1977)

In The Mystery of the Phantom Grasshopper, Hoppy the weather vane disappears from its perch above city hall. Trixie has always loved the weather vane and is upset that it has vanished. Later, a valuable coin collection also vanishes from a school classroom. Trixie fears that Miss Lawler and her friend, Sammy, may be responsible for the coin theft. Trixie really likes Miss Lawler and fears that she is guilty.

19. The Secret of the Unseen Treasure (1977)

In The Secret of the Unseen Treasure, Mrs. Elliot struggles to make ends meet. Her stepson, Max, helps her run the family's farm. Meanwhile, social security checks have been stolen along Glen Road, but Mrs. Elliot's check was not stolen, since she has it sent straight to the bank. Trixie suspects that Max is up to no good, and she wonders if Max is involved with the stolen checks, since he had advised Mrs. Elliot to have her checks sent to the bank.

20. The Mystery off Old Telegraph Road (1978)

After school, Trixie and Honey look around the art fair and are disappointed with the lack of displays. Nick Roberts, head of the art club, says that the club does not have the money to have more displays. Eager to help, the Bob-Whites get into the idea of a bike-a-ton. Trixie asks for Nick's help in making the posters for the bike-a-ton, but Nick disagrees and tries to convince Trixie not to have the event. With or without Nick's help, Trixie decides to go ahead with her plans, but the trouble soon starts. Honey gets into a fight with Trixie over Ben Riker, and Trixie is blamed for all the wrongdoings in the club. Trixie sees Nick Roberts ripping down her precious poster, and the bike-a-ton may be canceled.

21. The Mystery of the Castaway Children (1978)

The Beldens find a baby in Reddy's doghouse. The entire family and all of the Bob-Whites immediately fall in love with the baby and take turns caring for it. The Bob-Whites are distressed that the baby has bruises and are concerned for its welfare. They begin searching for the family.

22. The Mystery on Mead's Mountain (1978)

The Bob-Whites visit a mountain resort that Mr. Wheeler and a partner intend to develop. The Bob-Whites are to make a report of what they like and what can be improved. Trixie is soon involved in a mystery after Honey's watch vanishes. The lights go out unexpectedly, and Trixie receives several ominous warning notes.

23. The Mystery of the Queen's Necklace (1979)

Honey has a necklace that has been passed down through the Hart branch of her family. The Bob-Whites travel to England with Miss Trask to help research the history of the necklace. Trixie soon notices that a pickpocket keeps following them around. She suspects that the pickpocket is after the necklace. Trixie is soon suspicious of everyone, including the knowledgeable and affable guide.

24. The Mystery at Saratoga (1979)

Regan has disappeared, as he left shortly after the arrival of Mr. Worthington, who races valuable horses. Trixie investigates and learns that Regan once worked for Worthington and was suspected of doping a horse. Trixie is devastated, but her intuition tells her that Regan is innocent. Trixie and Honey stay with the Wheelers at Saratoga as they search for Regan and try to find a way to prove his innocence.

25. The Sasquatch Mystery (1979)

Miss Trask and the Bob-Whites (except Dan) go camping with the Belden cousins (Knut, Cap and Hallie) in Idaho, where they see what appears to be a sasquatch. The mystery deepens when the creature seems to commit a violent act.

26. The Mystery of the Headless Horseman (1979)

Diana's butler, Harrison, disappears, just before a charity event that he is to help run for the Bob-Whites. Trixie and Honey follow a trail of clues and discover Harrison locked in the basement of Sleepyside Hollow. Strangely, Harrison insists that he accidentally locked himself in the basement, when there is no possible way he could have bolted it from the outside. Trixie begins to suspect that Harrison is guilty of a crime, which puts a strain on her relationship with Di.

27. The Mystery of the Ghostly Galleon (1979)

While visiting at an inn owned by Miss Trask's brother, Trixie and the others attempt to solve an old mystery about a ship's captain who vanished in an unknown manner. They also help Mr. Trask, who is supposed to pay off a major loan that weekend.

28. The Hudson River Mystery (1979)

Brian begins acting strange. He is forgetful and uninterested, and he has a car accident. Meanwhile, Trixie sees a shark in the Hudson River, but no one will believe her. Trixie asks for help from an author who is staying in Sleepyside, and later, Trixie realizes that the author knows nothing about sharks.

29. The Mystery of the Velvet Gown (1980)

Trixie helps with the school's production of Romeo and Juliet. The drama teacher, Miss Darcy, has borrowed some costumes for the production. The velvet gown disappears, and Trixie finds Miss Darcy with the costume later. While Trixie trusts Miss Darcy, she begins to suspect that all is not right.

30. The Mystery of the Midnight Marauder (1980)

A vandal who calls himself the Midnight Marauder performs acts of mischief during the night. Strangely, the vandal warns his victims ahead of time, which is most curious. Mart is one of the suspects, simply because he will not admit to why he was at the school late one night. The Bob-Whites know that Mart is innocent but cannot figure out the guilty party. Trixie soon realizes that the advance warnings hold the key to determining the Midnight Marauder's true purpose.

31. The Mystery at Maypenny's (1980)

A factory plans to expand using part of Matthew Wheeler's game preserve. The factory also plans to take part of Mr. Maypenny's property. Mr. Maypenny is strongly opposed to the plan, while Mr. Wheeler is in favor of it. Even the Bob-Whites are divided, with some of them wanting the economic development and others wanting the game preserve to stay completely intact.

32. The Mystery of the Whispering Witch (1980)

Trixie and Honey help a classmate who lives in a house that is rumored to be haunted. Fay Franklin lives in the old Lisgard mansion with her mother, who is the housekeeper. Fay's mother has to be hospitalized, so Trixie and Honey spend the night in the mansion with Fay. The mansion is said to be haunted, and the girls are visited by the witch. Terrified, the girls make it through the night, but nobody will believe their story. It soon becomes apparent that Fay thinks she is possessed, but Trixie suspects a more earthly explanation.

33. The Mystery of the Vanishing Victim (1980)

The Bob-Whites decide to hold a rummage sale. A Model T Ford is donated to the sale, and the Bob-Whites advertise the sale by using the Model T to pick up donations. The vehicle is vandalized, and meanwhile, a man is run down by a vehicle. The man does not know his own name, and he disappears. Trixie vows to find him.

34. The Mystery of the Missing Millionaire (1980)

Trixie and Honey find a wallet on Glen Road near Mr. Lytell's store. The girls turn the wallet over to Mr. Lytell, who gets in touch with the owner's daughter. The girls learn that the man has disappeared, and his daughter, Laura, is very worried. Laura needs money to hire a private investigator, and Mr. Lytell loans her some money. Trixie doesn't like Laura, because Jim pays too much attention to her. Trixie is quite suspicious of Laura and doesn't know whether she has just cause or is suspicious because of her feelings.

35. The Mystery of the Memorial Day Fire (1984)

The Bob-Whites are watching the Memorial Day Parade with the rest of the town when a large explosion occurs inside a downtown building. The Bob-Whites are dismayed to learn that Nick Roberts' father's shop was the location of the explosion. The shop has been destroyed and Mr. Roberts is suspected of being the culprit. Trixie suspects a newspaper reporter of setting of the explosion, perhaps to create news.

36. The Mystery of the Antique Doll (1984)

Trixie and Honey are enlisted to help Mrs. De Keyser, an injured woman who lives on Glen Road. A new antique shop has opened next to Mrs. De Keyser's house, and Trixie finds it strange that the owner, Mr. Reid, knows very little about antiques. Later, Trixie and Honey plan to go to Paris for the weekend with the Wheelers as a reward for being finalists in a spelling bee. Mr. Reid requests that the girls pick up an antique doll for him and bring it to the United States.

37. The Pet Show Mystery (1985)

Trixie sees Norma Nelson feeding the pheasants on Glen Road. When Trixie realizes that the pheasants cannot find enough food during the winter, she and the Bob-Whites organize a pet show. The proceeds will purchase seed for the birds. As plans get underway, someone tries to sabotage the show. Trixie must find the culprit before the show is ruined.

38. The Indian Burial Ground Mystery (1985)

An archaeological dig commences in the Wheelers' game preserve. Trixie and Honey get jobs at the dig. Meanwhile, thieves are breaking into the homes of the wealthy. One night, the girls see a ghost in the game preserve while the Manor House is being robbed.

39. The Mystery of the Galloping Ghost (1986)

Trixie and Honey travel to Minnesota with Regan to stay on a ranch. At the ranch, Regan hopes to learn some new techniques that he can use with the Wheelers' horses. Trixie meets a ghost hunter, and she even sees what might be a ghost riding a horse. The ranch is in danger of being lost to a developer, and Trixie suspects trickery.

40. The Secret of the Shattered Sandcastle (unpublished)

Kathleen Krull was going to write volume 40 of the Trixie Belden series, set in San Diego, when the series was discontinued in 1986. The story was intended to be very Californian with surfing, sailing and a huge sand castle. An earthquake destroys the sandcastle and the Bob-Whites find drugs hidden in the rubble and Trixie hunts for the villains.

41. The Mystery of the Flying Mermaid (unpublished)

Joan Chase Bowden wrote a manuscript for what was intended to be #41 in the series, The Mystery of the Flying Mermaid. In the plot, Trixie and the Bob-Whites spend a summer weekend in New Jersey at a coastal town during the annual Mermaid Festival, intrigued by tales of a mystical "Flying Mermaid". While kayaking at night, they spot a shimmering figure in the water, leading them to investigate recent boat accidents tied to the legend. As they uncover a treasure-seeking plot involving suspicious characters, Trixie discovers that the "mermaid" is actually a local artist disguised to protect an endangered underwater habitat. In a dramatic showdown during the festival, the gang exposes the villains, securing the safety of the waters and celebrating their victory with the townspeople.
