= The Maker of Moons (short story) =

1896 short story by Robert W. Chambers

"The Maker of Moons" is an 1896 supernatural short story by American writer Robert W. Chambers. It is the eponymous story of the collection The Maker of Moons.

== Plot summary ==
The narrator states his wish to reveal all he can of Yue-Laou and the Xin.

He describes how he met his friend, Godfrey, at a gold-shop, where Godfrey showed him a golden chain. In the middle of the conversation they notice a strange creature crawling in Godfrey's pocket. Godfrey says:

It is, I believe, the connecting link between a sea-urchin, a spider, and the devil. It looks venomous but I can't find either fangs or mouth. Is it blind? These things may be eyes but they look as if they were painted. A Japanese sculptor might have produced such an impossible beast, but it is hard to believe that God did. It looks unfinished too.

Another friend arrives at the shop, a secret agent named Barris, who tells them that gold is a composite metal that can be made artificially, and that a large number of people have been making it.

A few days later the narrator, Barris, and their friend, Pierpont, leave for Cardinal Woods by Starlit Lake on a hunting expedition. Barris wanders off to explore the area.

While hunting, the narrator stumbles on a hidden fountain in the middle of the forest, where he meets a woman named Ysonde. They talk, and the narrator learns that she comes from the fictional city of Yian. She suddenly disappears. He believes that she is just a phantom, and returns to the hunt. He meets Barris, who describes the progress of his operation to catch the gold-makers. At night, the narrator sees a Chinaman, whom others have previously seen in the region. He is disturbed that he cannot find the fountain where he met Ysonde, even though he knew exactly where it was. He resigns himself to the possibility that she does not exist. Then he finds her again, and is thrilled. He asks her more about her origins. She frequently mentions the city of Yian, but not in great detail. After he returns to his cabin, the narrator becomes ill. After he recovers he asks Barris where Yian is. Barris denies the existence of the city, but under pressure he recants.

"Yian is a city", repeated Barris, "where the great river winds under the thousand bridges – where the gardens are sweet scented, and the air is filled with the music of silver bells".

My lips formed the question, "Where is this city?"

"It lies", said Barris, almost querulously, "across the seven oceans and the river which is longer than from the earth to the moon".

Barris says that it is the center of Yue-Laou—the Maker of Moons—and his sorcerers, the Kuen-Yuin. Barris once lived there. He describes how he was tricked by Yue-Laou: the Maker provided him with a lovely woman with whom he fell in love, and then he took her away from Barris. Barris believes that Xangi, who "is God", is greater than Yue-Laou and that he shall bring him again to his beloved.

The narrator again searches for Ysonde (who is speculated to be Barris's daughter from the woman he lost). Evading hordes of fleeing animals, he finally finds her. They witness in horror as Yue-Laou brings forth the monstrous Xin. Barris arrives and shoots at Yue-Laou, but his body is never found.

The conclusion establishes that this is a story within a story:

"Ysonde bends over my desk--I feel her hand on my arm, and she is saying, "Don't you think you have done enough to-day, dear? How can you write such silly nonsense without a shadow of truth or foundation?"

== Publication ==
The story was serialized several times in newspaper format in the United States, with illustrations by artists like J. J. Sheridan, and Howard V. Brown.

The story was received favorably abroad.

Shroud Publications released it as a chapbook in 1954, with the last two chapters omitted.
