= Ádám Bodor =

Hungarian writer

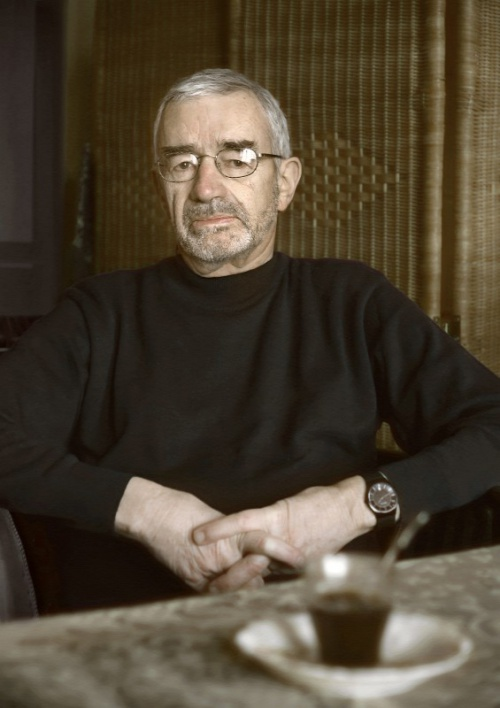
Ádám Bodor

Ádám Bodor (born 22 February 1936 in Cluj) is a Hungarian author of Transylvanian Hungarian origin. In contemporary Hungarian literature, he is widely considered a virtuoso of short-form writing, as well as a remarkably authentic builder of literary worlds.

== Life and writing ==
Bodor was born in Romania to a staunchly anti-communist father and was himself an anti-communist. In his youth he believed in Transylvanian independence and overthrowing the Communist state. At seventeen he was arrested by the Securitate. After being freed he studied at a Calvinist seminary and began writing. After this he left Romania for Hungary and then spent some time in the West. Several of his works have been adapted to film.

== Bibliography ==
- A tanú (Irodalmi, 1969)
- Plusz-mínusz egy nap (Kriterion, 1974)
- Megérkezés északra (Kriterion, 1978)
- Milyen is egy hágó? (Magvető, 1980)
- A Zangezur hegység (Kriterion, 1981)
- Az Eufrátesz Babilonnál (Szépirodalmi Könyvkiadó, 1985)
- Sinistra körzet (Magvető, 1992)
- The Sinistra Zone, trans. Paul Olchváry (New Directions, 2013)
- Vissza a fülesbagolyhoz (Magvető, 1992)
- Az érsek látogatása (Magvető, 1999)
- A börtön szaga. Válaszok Balla Zsófia kérdéseire. Egy korábbi rádióinterjú változata (Magvető, 2001)
- A részleg (Magvető, 2006)
- Az utolsó szénégetők. Tárcák 1978–1981 (Magvető, 2010)
- Állomás, éjszaka. Tízkezes egy Bodor novellára (Koinónia, 2011)
- Verhovina madarai (Magvető, 2011)
- The Birds of Verhovina, trans. Peter Sherwood (Jantar, 2021)
- A barátkozás lehetőségei (Magvető, 2016)
- Sehol (Magvető, 2019)
- Az értelmezés útvesztői. Tizenöt beszélgetés (Magvető, 2021)
- Behavazott lábnyomok (Magvető, 2026) – a collected volume of all his short stories published between 1968 and 2019
