= Jenő Rejtő =

Hungarian writer (1905–1943)

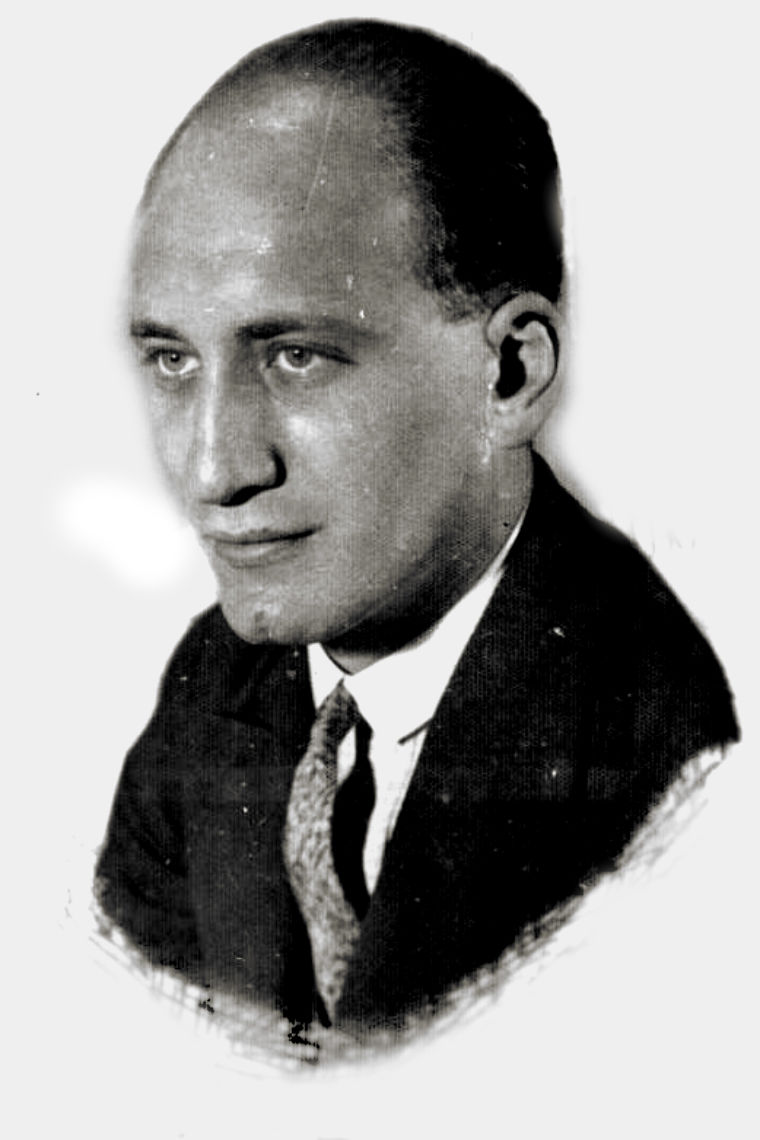
- Born: Jenő Reich; 29 March 1905; Budapest, Austria-Hungary
- Died: 1 January 1943 (aged 37); Evdakovo, Voronezh Oblast Soviet Union
- Occupations: Novelist, dramatist
- Writing career
- Notable works: The Invisible Legion, The 14-Carat Car, Dirty Fred, the Captain, The Three Musketeers in Africa, Quarantine at the Grand Hotel

Jenő Rejtő (29 March 1905 - 1 January 1943) was a Hungarian interwar journalist, pulp fiction writer and playwright, famous in Hungary for his books and novellas - adventure and detective novels and parodies of these genres, characterized by a unique sense of absurd humour. He died in a labour camp during World War II.

== Early life ==
Jenő Rejtő was born in Budapest, Austria-Hungary, on 29 March 1905, to Áron Reich Lipót and Wolf Ilona. He had two brothers, Lajos and Gyula. He lived with ill-health as a child, but took boxing and acting classes as well as writing poetry. He completed his studies in a drama school in 1924, after which he travelled extensively throughout Europe.

He studied to be an actor in Berlin, then travelled around Europe, working as a longshoreman in Germany, a fisherman in Sweden, a construction worker in Switzerland, and a dancer in France, among others. He also joined a travelling circus for a time, and visited North Africa. It remains subject to debate whether he had actually joined the French Foreign Legion -- the scene of many of his novels.

== Career ==
After returning from his travelling, he made his living as a playwright in Hungary, most notably with his operetta, Aki mer, az nyer (Who Dares Wins, 1934).

Later, he started to write adventure novels based on his trips and experiences abroad, using a writing style which included his unusual sense of humour. His most successful novels were written under the pseudonym P. Howard, and parodied the French Foreign Legion. His most popular novels combined elements from detective novels, romance and humour. He also wrote novels in the tradition of American Westerns, as well as a large number of cabaret farces, and editing the first and only edition of the newspaper, Nagykörút (Grand Boulevard).

While a writer, he was a regular customer at the Cafe Japan (Japán kávéház) in Budapest, which was near the Nova publishing house, his publisher. At times, he paid for his coffee with paragraphs written on napkins, which in turn were taken to Nova, where they were purchased and collated.

== Death ==
Starting in 1939, he could not publish his novels any more under his own name because of his Jewish origins. On 9 October 1942, an article in the Nazi Arrow Cross Party's newspaper (Egyedül Vagyunk [We Are Alone]) exposed Rejtő as a Jew and reported that he was seen writing calmly in Budapest cafés while evading the labour service draft that was compulsory for Jewish men of military age (they were forbidden to perform arm-bearing service in the military). He was seriously ill by this time but was taken by force from hospital to do his labour service on the eastern front, into the Soviet Union.

He died in Evdakovo, Voronezh Oblast, Soviet Union (then under Axis occupation) on 1 January 1943.

== Legacy ==
In the early years of communism his works were only available on the black market as pre-war editions, but from the 1960s on, his novels were republished, and they gained instant popularity in Hungary (then still under communist rule). Some of his works have been made into films and comic books. Rejtő's comic book adaptations by Pál Korcsmáros (1916–1975) are regarded as classics in their own right in Hungary.

Rejtő's memory is kept alive in Budapest. In 2001 a street was named after him, while in 2003 there was an exhibition dedicated to him in the Petőfi Museum of Literature (Petőfi Irodalmi Múzeum). In 2005 his picture appeared on a Hungarian postage stamp (as part of the series "Great Hungarians") and there was an initiative to erect his statue in Budapest.

== Works ==
=== In English ===
Many of Rejtő's numerous works - the most famous of which are his Foreign Legion books and his "Dirty Fred" series - have been translated into English:

- The "Dirty Fred" sailor novels - standalone humorous adventures featuring colourful characters of the underworld of the world's port cities, including Jimmy Ears, Dirty Fred the Captain and the blue-bearded Mister Wagner:
  - The Lost Cruiser (Az elveszett cirkáló), 2024: ISBN 979-8329023350 (e-book and print)
  - Dirty Fred, the Captain (Piszkos Fred, a kapitány), 2024: ISBN 979-8329346626 (e-book and print)
  - Dirty Fred Intervenes (Piszkos Fred közbelép), 2024: ISBN 979-8329351095 (e-book and print)
  - The Found Cruiser (A megkerült cirkáló), 2024: ISBN 979-8329387773 (e-book and print)
- French Foreign Legion adventure novels:
  - The Cursed Shore (Az elátkozott part), 2024: ISBN 979-8338985779 (e-book and print)
  - The Three Musketeers in Africa (A három testőr Afrikában), 2024: ISBN 979-8339444305 (e-book and print)
  - March or Die (Menni vagy meghalni), 2024: ISBN 979-8338284438 (e-book and print)
  - The Bone Brigade (Csontbrigád), 2024: ISBN 979-8333528568 (e-book and print)
  - The Frontier Garrison (Az előretolt helyőrség)
    - 2025 translation: ISBN 979-8310588264 (e-book and print)
    - 2014 translation: ISBN 978-1940872001 (Kindle); ISBN 9781940872018 (print)
  - The Invisible Legion (A láthatatlan légio), 2025: ISBN 979-8311342919 (e-book and print)
  - A Gentleman even in Hell (Az úr a pokolban is úr), 2024: ASIN B0DKQJZLZX (e-book)
- Crime and mystery:
  - The Embezzled Cashier (Az elsikkasztott pénztáros), 2025: ISBN 979-8312545654 (e-book and print)
  - The Stolen Knight (Az ellopott futár), 2025: ISBN 979-8316030989 (e-book and print)
  - One Fool Makes A Hundred (Egy bolond száz bajt csinál), 2021: ISBN 979-8790013652
  - Quarantine at the Grand Hotel (Vesztegzár a Grand Hotelben), Corvina, 2005: ISBN 978-9631358148 (out of print)
  - The 14-Carat Roadster (A tizennégy karátos autó), 2017
  - The Blonde Hurricane (A szőke ciklon), Corvina, 2013: ISBN 978-9631352856 (out of print)

=== In Hungarian ===
The original Hungarian editions of his works entered the public domain everywhere on 1 January 2014 (70 years after the January following the author's death).

All of the Hungarian texts and scans of most first editions of Rejtő's works are available on the archive website of the National Széchényi Library, Hungary's national library.

Some of his most popular works not translated into English include:

- Texas Bill, a fenegyerek ("Texas Bill, the Daredevil")
- Pokol a hegyek között ("Hell among the Hills")
- Megyek Párizsba ahol még nem haldokoltam ("I'll go to Paris, where I've never been dying")

A full list of his untranslated novels, novellas and plays is available in the bibliography of the Hungarian version of this article.
