= Ray Bradbury bibliography =

The following is a list of works by Ray Bradbury.

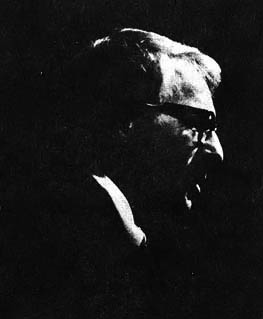
Bradbury in 1976

== Novels ==
- (1950) The Martian Chronicles – Fix-up novel consisting of mostly previously published, loosely connected stories.
- (1953) Fahrenheit 451
- (1957) Dandelion Wine – Fix-up novel of mostly previously published, loosely connected stories.
- (1962) Something Wicked This Way Comes
- (1972) The Halloween Tree
- (1985) Death Is a Lonely Business
- (1990) A Graveyard for Lunatics
- (1992) Green Shadows, White Whale – Fictionalized autobiographical reminiscences, portions of which had been previously published as individual stories.
- (2001) From the Dust Returned – Fix-up novel of previously published, loosely connected stories.
- (2002) Let's All Kill Constance
- (2006) Farewell Summer

== Collections ==
In addition to these collections, many of Bradbury's short stories have been published in multi-author anthologies. Almost fifty additional Bradbury stories have never been collected anywhere after their initial publication in periodicals.

- (1947) Dark Carnival
- (1951) The Illustrated Man
- (1953) The Golden Apples of the Sun
- (1955) The October Country
- (1959) A Medicine for Melancholy (U.S.) / The Day It Rained Forever (U.K.)
- (1962) The Small Assassin
- (1962) R is for Rocket
- (1964) The Machineries of Joy
- (1965) The Autumn People
- (1965) The Vintage Bradbury
- (1966) Tomorrow Midnight
- (1966) S is for Space
- (1966) Twice 22
- (1969) I Sing The Body Electric
- (1975) Ray Bradbury
- (1976) Long After Midnight
- (1978) The Mummies of Guanajuato
- (1979) The Fog Horn & Other Stories
- (1980) One Timeless Spring
- (1980) The Last Circus and the Electrocution
- (1980) The Stories of Ray Bradbury
- (1981) The Fog Horn and Other Stories
- (1983) Dinosaur Tales
- (1984) A Memory of Murder
- (1985) The Wonderful Death of Dudley Stone
- (1988) The Toynbee Convector
- (1990) Classic Stories 1
- (1990) Classic Stories 2
- (1991) The Parrot Who Met Papa
- (1991) Selected from Dark They Were, and Golden-Eyed
- (1996) Quicker Than The Eye
- (1997) Driving Blind
- (2001) Ray Bradbury Collected Short Stories
- (2001) The Playground
- (2002) One More for the Road
- (2003) Bradbury Stories: 100 of His Most Celebrated Tales
- (2003) Is That You, Herb?
- (2004) The Cat's Pajamas: Stories
- (2005) A Sound of Thunder and Other Stories
- (2007) The Dragon Who Ate His Tail
- (2007) Now and Forever: Somewhere a Band Is Playing & Leviathan '99
- (2007) Summer Morning, Summer Night
- (2009) Ray Bradbury Stories Volume 2
- (2009) We'll Always Have Paris: Stories
- (2010) A Pleasure To Burn
- (2010) The Lost Bradbury: Forgotten Tales of Ray Bradbury
- (2011) The Collected Stories of Ray Bradbury: A Critical Edition – Volume 1, 1938–1943
- (2014) The Collected Stories of Ray Bradbury: A Critical Edition – Volume 2, 1943–1944
- (2017) The Collected Stories of Ray Bradbury: A Critical Edition – Volume 3, 1944–1945
- (2020) Killer, Come Back to Me: The Crime Stories of Ray Bradbury (2020)

=== Anthologies ===
Bradbury edited these collections of works by other authors

- (1952) Timeless Stories for Today and Tomorrow
- (1956) The Circus of Dr. Lao and Other Improbable Stories

== Short stories ==
Bradbury has written over 400 novelettes and short stories.

- (1938) "Hollerbochen's Dilemma"
- (1938) "Hollerbochen Comes Back"
- (1939) "Don't Get Technatal"
- (1939) "Gold"
- (1939) "The Pendulum"
- (1940) "The Maiden of Jirbu" (with Bob Tucker)
- (1940) "Tale of the Tortletwitch" (as Guy Amory)
- (1941) "The Trouble with Humans is People"
- (1941) "Pendulum" (with Henry Hasse)"
- (1942) "The Candle"
- (1943) "The Scythe"
- (1944) "Reunion"
- (1944) "The Lake"
- (1945) "The Watchers"
- (1945) "The Big Black and White Game"
- (1945) "Invisible Boy"
- (1946) "Frost and Fire"
- (1946) "The Traveller"
- (1946) "Homecoming"
- (1946) "The Million Year Picnic"
- (1947) "I See You Never"
- (1947) "The Small Assassin"
- (1948) "Fever Dream"
- (1948) "The Fruit at the Bottom of the Bowl" (also published as "Touch and Go")
- (1948) "The Long Years"
- (1948) "Mars Is Heaven!"
- (1949) "The Exiles" (also published as "The Mad Wizards of Mars")
- (1949) "Dark They Were, and Golden-Eyed"
- (1949) "Holiday"
- (1949) "Marionettes, Inc."
- (1950) "August 2002: Night Meeting"
- (1950) "I'll Not Look For Wine"
- (1950) "The Rocket"
- (1950) "The Veldt"
- (1950) "There Will Come Soft Rains"
- (1950) "Ylla"
- (1951) "The Beast from 20,000 Fathoms" (also published as "The Fog Horn")
- (1951) "Embroidery"
- (1951) "The Fireman"
- (1951) "The Fog Horn"
- (1951) "Here There Be Tygers"
- (1951) "The Pedestrian"
- (1952) "The April Witch"
- (1952) "A Sound of Thunder"
- (1952) "The Wilderness"
- (1953) "The Flying Machine"
- (1953) "The Golden Kite, the Silver Wind"
- (1953) "Dandelion Wine"
- (1953) "The Meadow"
- (1953) "The Murderer"
- (1953) "Sun and Shadow"
- (1954) "All Summer in a Day"
- (1956) "The Sound of Summer Running" (also published as "Summer in the Air")
- (1958) "The Wonderful Ice Cream Suit" (also published as "The Magic White Suit")
- (1959) "The Dragon"
- (1959) "A Medicine for Melancholy"
- (1960) "The Best of All Possible Worlds"
- (1962) "The Machineries of Joy"
- (1963) "The Prehistoric Producer" (also published as "Tyrannosaurus Rex")
- (1964) "The Cold Wind and the Warm"
- (1964) "The One Who Waits"
- (1966) "The Man in the Rorschach Shirt"
- (1967) "The Lost City of Mars"
- (1978) "The Mummies of Guanajuato"
- (1969) "Downwind From Gettysburg'"
- (1979) "The Aqueduct"
- (1984) "Banshee"
- (1984) "The Toynbee Convector"
- (1994) "From the Dust Returned"
- (2003) "Is That You, Herb?"
- (2009) "Juggernaut"

== Plays ==
- (1953) The Flying Machine: A One-Act Play for Three Men
- (1963) The Anthem Sprinters and Other Antics
- (1965) A Device Out of Time: A One-Act Play
- (1966) The Day It Rained Forever: A Comedy in One Act
- (1966) The Pedestrian: A Fantasy in One Act
- (1972) Leviathan '99: A Drama for the Stage
- (1972) The Wonderful Ice Cream Suit and Other Plays
- (1975) Pillar of Fire and Other Plays for Today, Tomorrow, and Beyond Tomorrow
- (1975) Kaleidoscope
- (1976) That Ghost, That Bride of Time: Excerpts from a Play-in-Progress Based on the Moby Dick Mythology and Dedicated to Herman Melville
- (1984) Forever and the Earth
- (1986) The Martian Chronicles
- (1986) The Wonderful Ice Cream Suit
- (1986) Fahrenheit 451
- (1988) Dandelion Wine
- (1988) To The Chicago Abyss
- (1988) The Veldt
- (1988) Falling Upward
- (1990) The Day It Rained Forever
- (1991) Ray Bradbury on Stage: A Chrestomathy of His Plays
- (2010) Wisdom 2116 (US) or Ray Bradbury's 2116 The Musical (UK)

== Screenplays, teleplays and radio adaptations ==
- (1953) It Came from Outer Space (original treatment)
- (1956) Moby Dick
- Jane Wyman Presents The Fireside Theatre
  - (1956) "The Bullet Trick" / "The Marked Bullet"
- Alfred Hitchcock Presents
  - (1956) "Shopping for Death"
  - (1958) "Design for Loving"
  - (1959) "Special Delivery"
  - (1962) "The Faith of Aaron Menefee" (from the story by Stanley Ellin)
- Steve Canyon
  - (1959) "The Gift"
- Trouble Shooters
  - (1959) "The Tunnel to Yesterday"
- (1961) King of Kings (narration, uncredited)
- The Twilight Zone (1959)
  - (1962) "I Sing the Body Electric"
- Alcoa Premiere
  - (1962) "The Jail"
- (1962) Icarus Montgolfier Wright
- (1963) Dial Double Zero (The Story of a Writer)
- The Alfred Hitchcock Hour
  - (1964) "The Life Work of Juan Diaz"
- (1969) The Picasso Summer
- (1969) The Illustrated Man
- Curiosity Shop
  - (1971) "The Groon"
- (1979) Gnomes (screenplay)
- (1980) The Martian Chronicles
- (1982) The Electric Grandmother
- (1983) Something Wicked This Way Comes
- (1983–84) Bradbury 13 (radio series)
- (1983) Quest
- (1985–92) The Ray Bradbury Theater
- The Twilight Zone (1985)
  - (1986) "The Elevator"
- (1992) Little Nemo: Adventures in Slumberland (story concept)
- (1993) The Halloween Tree
- (1997) Dandelion Wine
- (1998) The Wonderful Ice Cream Suit
- (2005) A Sound of Thunder
- (2008) Ray Bradbury's Chrysalis
- (2015) The Whispers

== Children's literature ==
- (1955) Switch on the Night
- (1982) The Other Foot
- (1982) The Veldt
- (1987) The April Witch
- (1987) The Fog Horn
- (1987) Fever Dream
- (1991) The Smile
- (1992) The Toynbee Convector
- (1997) With Cat for Comforter
- (1997) Dogs Think That Every Day Is Christmas
- (1998) Ahmed and the Oblivion Machines: A Fable
- (2006) The Homecoming

== Audio releases ==
- (1958) The Martian Chronicles (8 LPs)
- (1962) Burgess Meredith Reads Ray Bradbury (LP)
- (1963) Sum and Substance (LP)
- (1967) The Martian Chronicles (5 LPs)
- (1969) Teaching Guide – "The Smile" (LP)
- (1971) Christus Apollo (LP)
- (1973) Dimension X (cassette)
- (1974) Three Classic Stories (cassette)
- (1975) The Martian Chronicles: There Will Come Soft Rains and Usher II (LP)
- (1975) The Illustrated Man (2 cassettes)
- (1976) The Illustrated Man: The Veldt and Marionettes, Inc. (LP/cassette)
- (1976) The Martian Chronicles and The Illustrated Man (cassette)
- (1977) The Martian Chronicles (2 cassettes)
- (1977) Science Fiction Soundbook (cassette)
- (1979) The Ray Bradbury Cassette Library (6 cassettes)
- (1979) The Martian Chronicles: There Will Come Soft Rains and Usher II (cassette)
- (1980) Long After Midnight (cassette)
- (1980) Our Lady Queen of the Angels: A Celebrational Environment (cassette)
- (1982) Fahrenheit 451 (cassette)
- (1984) A Sound of Thunder/The Screaming Woman (cassette)
- (1984) Bradbury 13 (cassette series)
- (1985) The Martian Chronicles (2 cassettes)
- (1985) Ray Bradbury Himself: Reads 19 Complete Stories (4 cassettes)
- (1986) The Martian Chronicles (6 cassettes)
- (1986) Fantastic Tales of Ray Bradbury (6 cassettes)
- (1986) The Stories of Ray Bradbury (2 cassettes)
- (1986) Ray Bradbury (cassette)
- (1986) Night Call, Collect/The Ravine (cassette)
- (1986) The Veldt/There Was An Old Woman (cassette)
- (1986) The Wind/Dark They Were and Golden Eyed (cassette)
- (1986) The Man: Interview With Ray Bradbury (cassette)
- (1986) Kaleidoscope/Here There Be Tygers (cassette)
- (1986) The Fox and the Forest/The Happiness Machine (cassette)
- (1987) The Martian Chronicles (cassette)
- (1987) Ray Bradbury (cassette)
- (1987) Dandelion Wine (cassette)
- (1988) Fahrenheit 451 (cassette/CD)
- (1988) The Illustrated Man (cassette/CD)
- (1988) Omni Audio Experience I (cassette)
- (1988) The Golden Apples of the Sun (cassette/CD)
- (1989) Death and the Compass/The Playground (cassette)
- (1989) The Toynbee Convector (cassette)
- (1989) Death and The Compass and The Playground – with Jorge Luis Borges (cassette)
- (1990) I Sing The Body Electric (cassette/CD)
- (1990) The October Country (cassette/CD)
- (1990) Death is a Lonely Business (cassette/CD)
- (1990) Long after Midnight/The Halloween Tree (cassette/CD)
- (1991) Journeys Through Time and Space (cassette)
- (1991) Ray Bradbury: Tales of Fantasy (2 cassettes)
- (1991) Ray Bradbury (cassette)
- (1991) Fahrenheit 451 (cassette)
- (1991) The Martian Chronicles (cassette)
- (1991) Nathaniel Hawthorne Read by Ray Bradbury (cassette)
- (1992) A Sound of Thunder (cassette)
- (1992) Kaleidoscope and There Was An Old Woman (cassette)
- (1992) Green Shadows, White Whale (2 cassettes)
- (1992) Ray Bradbury Himself: Reads 19 Complete Stories (4 cassettes)
- (1993) William Shatner and Leonard Nimoy Read Four Science Fiction Classics (4 cassettes)
- (1994) Dark They Were and Golden Eyed (cassette)
- (1994) The Ravine and Here There Be Tygers (cassette)
- (1994) The Man and The Happiness Machine (cassette)
- (1994) The Illustrated Man (cassette)
- (1994) The Wind and The Veldt (cassette)
- (1994) Vanishing Point: Radio Dramas from the Fourth Dimension (cassette)
- (1995) Fahrenheit 451 (cassette)
- (1995) We Hold These Truths (CD)
- (1996) The October Country (cassette)
- (1996) Long After Midnight and The Halloween Tree (cassette)
- (1996) I Sing The Body Electric (cassette)
- (1996) Kaleidoscope/The Human Operators (cassette)
- (1997) Something Wicked this Way Comes (6 cassettes)
- (1997) The Martian Chronicles (cassette)
- (1998) Ray Bradbury: Science Fiction (cassette)
- (1999) The Ray Bradbury Theater (cassette)
- (1999) The Science Fiction Theater (cassette)
- (1997) Something Wicked this Way Comes (6 cassettes)
- (2000) Science Fiction on Old Time Radio (cassette/CD)
- (2001) Fahrenheit 451 (cassette/CD)
- (2001) From the Dust Returned: A Family Remembrance (cassette)
- (2001) Dark Carnival (CD)
- (2001) The 60 Greatest Old Time Radio Shows from Science Fiction: Selected by Ray Bradbury (cassette/CD)
- (2002) The Illustrated Man (CD/cassette)
- (2002) One More for the Road: A New Story Collection (cassette)
- (2002) 2000X: Tales of the Next Millennia (cassette/CD)
- (2002) Christus Apollo (CD)
- (2003) The War of The Worlds (CD)
- (2004) The Greatest Science Fiction Shows (CD)
- (2006) Fahrenheit 451 (3 CDs)
- (2006) Farewell Summer (CD)
- (2007) Now and Forever (cassette/CD)
- (2007) Dandelion Wine (CD)
- (2007) Something Wicked This Way Comes (CD)
- (2008) Live Radio Theatre From the International Mystery Writers' Festival (CD)
- (2008) Selected Shorts: Readers and Writers (CD)
- (2009) We'll Always Have Paris (CD)
- (2010) Bradbury 13 (CD)

== Non-fiction ==
- (1952) No Man Is an Island
- (1962) The Essence of Creative Writing: Letters to a Young Aspiring Author
- (1967) Creative Man Among His Servant Machines
- (1971) Mars and the Mind of Man
- (1978) The God in Science Fiction
- (1979) About Norman Corwin
- (1981) There is Life on Mars
- (1985) The Art of Playboy
- (1990) Zen in the Art of Writing
- (1991) Yestermorrow: Obvious Answers to Impossible Futures
- (2004) Conversations with Ray Bradbury (ed. Steven L. Aggelis)
- (2005) Bradbury Speaks: Too Soon from the Cave, Too Far from the Stars
- (2007) Match to Flame: The Fictional Paths to Fahrenheit 451

== Miscellaneous ==
- (1977) Where Robot Mice & Robot Men Run Round in Robot Towns
- (1979) To Sing Strange Songs
- (1979) Beyond 1984: Remembrance of Things Future
- (1980) The Ghosts of Forever
- (1982) The Complete Poems of Ray Bradbury
- (1982) The Love Affair
- (1985) Long After Ecclesiastes: New Biblical Texts
- (1998) Christus Apollo: Cantata Celebrating the Eighth Day of Creation and the Promise of the Ninth
- (2000) Witness and Celebrate
- (2001) A Chapbook for Burnt-Out Priests, Rabbis and Ministers
- (2001) Dark Carnival (limited edition with supplemental materials)
- (2002) I Live By the Invisible: New & Selected Poems
- (2003) The Best of The Ray Bradbury Chronicles
- (2003) The Best of Ray Bradbury: The Graphic Novel
- (2003) It Came from Outer Space (screenplay and related materials)
- (2005) The Halloween Tree, limited lettered and numbered edition which includes the novel, screenplay, variant texts, and related materials
- (2007) Futuria Fantasia
- (2007) Somewhere a Band is Playing: Early Drafts and Final Novella
