= Ray Bradbury short fiction bibliography =

This is a chronological list of short fiction by American writer Ray Bradbury. Only original works are listed, along with their first publication. Several stories exist in one or more revised versions, sometimes under different titles.

== 1930s ==
=== 1938 ===
Title	Originally published in	Versions	Notes
"Hollerbochen's Dilemma"	Imagination, Jan. -38		
"The Death of Mr. McCarthy"	Blue and White Daily [Los Angeles High School], Apr. 21 -38		
"Hollerbochen Comes Back"	[Mikros], Nov. -38		

=== 1939 ===
Title	Originally published in	Versions	Notes
"How to Run a Successful Ghost Agency"	D'Journal, Mar. -39		as Brian Eldred
"Mummy Dust"	D'Journal, May -39		as Cecil Clayborne Cunningham
"Don't Get Technatal"	Futuria Fantasia, summer -39		as Ron Reynolds
"Gold"	Science Fiction Fan, Aug. -39		
"The Pendulum"	Futuria Fantasia, fall -39		uncredited; developed into "Pendulum (-41)"

== 1940s ==
=== 1940 ===
Title	Originally published in	Versions	Notes
"The Maiden of Jirbu"	Polaris, Mar. -40		with Bob Tucker
"Tale of the Tortletwitch" alt. title: "Remembrance of Things Past"	Spaceways, Apr. -40		as Guy Amory
"Luana the Living"	Polaris, Jun. -40		
"The Piper"	Futuria Fantasia, Sep. -40		as Ron Reynolds; developed into "The Piper (-43)"
"The Last Man"	The Damn Thing, Nov. -40		
"It's Not the Heat, It's the Hu—"	Script, Nov. 2 -40		
"The Fight of the Good Ship Clarissa"	Futuria Fantasia, winter -40		uncredited
"Genie Trouble"	The Damn Thing, Dec. -40		
"The Tale of the Terrible Typer"	Fantasite, Nov. -40		

=== 1941 ===
Title	Originally published in	Versions	Notes
"How Am I Today, Doctor?"	The Damn Thing, Feb. -41		
"The Trouble with Humans Is People"	The Damn Thing, Mar. -41		
"Tale of the Mangledomvrich"	Snide, Jun. -41		
"Wilber and His Germ"	Script, May 24 -41		basis for "Fever Dream (-48)"
"Pendulum"	Super Science Stories, Nov. -41		with Henry Hasse; based on "The Pendulum (-39)"

=== 1942 ===
Title	Originally published in	Versions	Notes
"Eat, Drink and Be Wary"	Astounding Science-Fiction, Jul. -42		
"The Candle"	Weird Tales, Nov. -42		with Henry Kuttner (uncredited)

=== 1943 ===
Title	Originally published in	Versions	Notes
"The Piper"	Thrilling Wonder Stories, Feb. -43		based on "The Piper (-40)"
"The Wind"	Weird Tales, Mar. -43		
"Gabriel's Horn"	Captain Future, spring -43		with Henry Hasse
"Subterfuge"	Astonishing Stories, Apr. -43		
"The Crowd"	Weird Tales, May -43		
"The Scythe"	Weird Tales, Jul. -43	revised: Dark Carnival (-47)	
"Doodad"	Astounding Science-Fiction, Sep. -43		manuscript title: "Everything Instead of Something"
"And Watch the Fountains"	Astounding Science-Fiction, Sep. -43		
"Promotion to Satellite"	Thrilling Wonder Stories, fall -43		
"The Ducker"	Weird Tales, Nov. -43		forerunner for "Bang! You're Dead! (-44)"
"King of the Gray Spaces" alt. title: "R Is for Rocket"	Famous Fantastic Mysteries, Dec. -43	revised: R Is for Rocket ('62) comic-strip: Weird Fantasy 19, '53	

=== 1944 ===
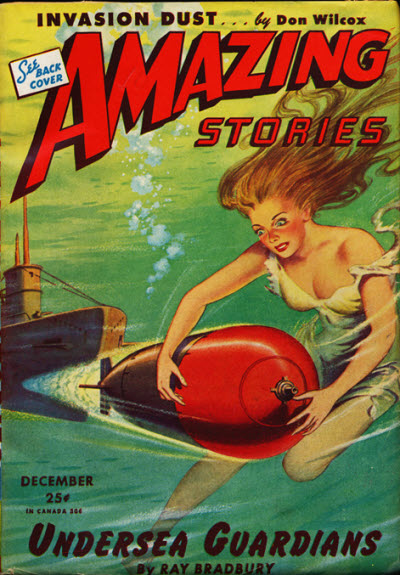

Title	Originally published in	Versions	Notes
"The Sea Shell"	Weird Tales, Jan. -44		
"Reunion"	Weird Tales, Mar. -44		
"The Monster Maker"	Planet Stories, spring -44		manuscript title: "Pirates in Profile"
"I, Rocket"	Amazing Stories, May -44	revised: Long After Midnight (1976) comic-strip: Weird Fantasy 20, '53	
"The Lake"	Weird Tales, May -44	comic-strip: The Vault of Horror 31, '53	
"Morgue Ship"	Planet Stories, summer -44		
"There Was an Old Woman"	Weird Tales, Jul. -44	revised: Dark Carnival (-47) comic-strip: Tales From the Crypt 34, '53	
"Killer, Come Back to Me!"	Detective Tales, Jul. -44		manuscript title: "Autopsy"
"The Long Night"	New Detective, Jul. -44		
"Yesterday I Lived!"	Flynn's Detective Fiction, Aug. -44		manuscript title: "No Phones, Private Coffin"
"The Trunk Lady"	Detective Tales, Sep. -44		
"Bang! You're Dead!"	Weird Tales, Sep. -44		
"And Then—the Silence" alt. title: "The Silence"	Super Science Stories, Oct. -44		
"Half-Pint Homicide"	Detective Tales, Nov. -44		manuscript title: "Enter the Douser"
"The Jar"	Weird Tales, Nov. -44	Dark Carnival (-47) The October Country (-55)	1964 episode of The Alfred Hitchcock Hour
"It Burns Me Up!"	Dime Mystery Magazine, Nov. -44		
"Lazarus Come Forth"	Planet Stories, winter -44		
"Undersea Guardians"	Amazing Stories, Dec. -44		
"Four-Way Funeral"	Detective Tales, Dec. -44		

=== 1945 ===
Title	Originally published in	Versions	Notes
"Skeleton [i]"	??		not to be confused with "Skeleton [ii]" which is better known
"The Poems"	Weird Tales, Jan. -45		
" 'I'm Not So Dumb!' "	Detective Tales, Feb. -45		
"Hell's Half Hour"	New Detective Magazine, Mar. -45		
"The Tombstone"	Weird Tales, Mar. -45		
"The Watchers [i]"	Weird Tales, May -45		not to be confused with "The Watchers [ii]" from The Martian Chronicles
"Corpse Carnival"	Dime Mystery Magazine, Jul. -45		as D. R. Banat
"Dead Men Rise Up Never"	Dime Mystery Magazine, Jul. -45		
"The Dead Man"	Weird Tales, Jul. -45		
"The Big Black and White Game"	The American Mercury, Aug. -45		
"Skeleton [ii]"	Weird Tales, Sep. -45		not to be confused with the lesser known "Skeleton [i]"
"The Long Way Home"	Dime Mystery Magazine, Nov. -45		
"Invisible Boy"	Mademoiselle, Nov. -45		

=== 1946 ===
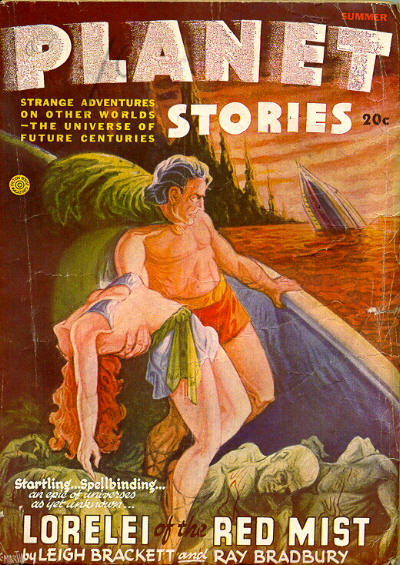

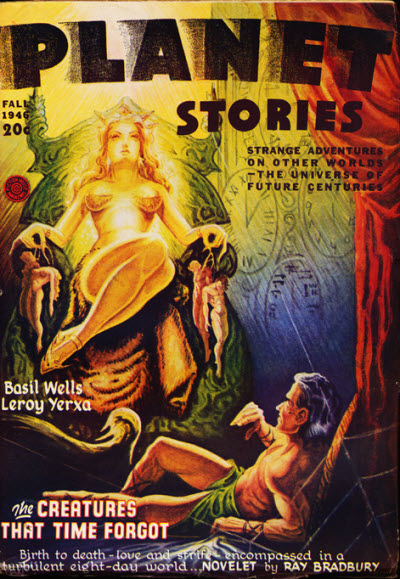

Title	Originally published in	Versions	Notes
"Final Victim"	Amazing Stories, Feb. -46		
"The Traveller" alt. title: "The Traveler"	Weird Tales, Mar. -46		
"Defense Mech"	Planet Stories, spring -46		
"Rocket Skin"	Thrilling Wonder Stories, spring -46		
"The Miracles of Jamie"	Charm, Apr. -46		
"One Timeless Spring"	Collier's, Apr. 13 -46		
"The Smiling People"	Weird Tales, May -46	revised: Dark Carnival (-47)	
"Her Eyes, Her Lips, Her Limbs"	Californian, Jun. -46		as William Elliott
"Lorelei of the Red Mist"	Planet Stories, summer -46	abridged: Three Times Infinity ('58)	with Leigh Brackett; manuscript title: "Red Sea of Venus"
"The Million Year Picnic" alt. titles: "The Million-Year Picnic" "The Long Weekend" "October 2026: The Million-Year Picnic"	Planet Stories, summer -46	comic-strip: Weird Fantasy 21, '53	manuscript title: "Family Outing"
"Chrysalis"	Amazing Stories, Jul. -46		
"The Night" alt. title: "Ice Cream on a Summer's Evening"	Weird Tales, Jul. -46	rewritten/abridged: Dandelion Wine ('57)	
"The Electrocution"	Californian, Aug. -46		as William Elliott
"The Creatures That Time Forgot" alt. title: "Frost and Fire"	Planet Stories, fall -46	revised: R Is for Rocket ('62) comic-strip: Frost and Fire, '85	manuscript title: "Eight Day Wonder"
"Homecoming" alt. title: "The Homecoming"	Mademoiselle, Oct. -46 (revised)	original: Dark Carnival (-47) re-revised: The October Country (1955) rewritten: From the Dust Returned (2001) comic-strip: The Ray Bradbury Chronicles 3, 1992 final revision: The October Country, paperback ed. (which?)	
"Let's Play 'Poison'"	Weird Tales, Nov. -46	comic-strip: The Vault of Horror 29, '53	
"The Small Assassin"	Dime Mystery Magazine, Nov. -46	revised: Dark Carnival (-47) later revisions: ?? comic-strip: Shock Suspenstories 7, '53	
"A Careful Man Dies"	New Detective, Nov. -46		

=== 1947 ===
Title	Originally published in	Versions	Notes
"The Handler"	Weird Tales, Jan. -47	comic-strip: Tales From the Crypt 36, '53	
"The Man Upstairs"	Harper's, Mar. -47 (revised)	original: Dark Carnival (-47)	
"Rocket Summer"	Planet Stories, spring -47		not to be confused with "January 1999: Rocket Summer (-50)"
"Tomorrow and Tomorrow"	Fantastic Adventures, May -47		with Leigh Brackett (opening)
"The Cistern" alt. title: "Cistern"	Mademoiselle, May -47 (revised)	original: Dark Carnival (-47)	
"The Emissary"	Dark Carnival (-47)		
"Jack-in-the-Box"	Dark Carnival (-47)		
"The Next in Line"	Dark Carnival (-47) ??		
"The Night Sets"	Dark Carnival (-47)		
"The Maiden"	Dark Carnival (-47) ??		
"The Coffin" alt. title: "Wake for the Living"	Dark Carnival (-47)		
"Interim [i]"	Weird Tales, Jul. -47		not to be confused with "Interim [ii]" or "February 2003: Interim (-50)"
"Uncle Einar"	Dark Carnival (-47)		
"El Dia de Muerte" alt. title: "Sombra Y Sol"	Touchstone, fall -47		
"Interim [ii]" alt. title: "Time Intervening"	Epoch, fall -47		not to be confused with "Interim [i]" or "February 2003: Interim (-50)"
"Zero Hour"	Planet Stories, fall -47	comic-strip: Weird Fantasy 18, '53	
"I See You Never"	New Yorker, Nov. 8, -47		
"The Irritated People"	Thrilling Wonder Stories, Dec. -47		

=== 1948 ===
Title	Originally published in	Versions	Notes
"The Candy Skull"	Dime Mystery Magazine, January 1948		
"The Shape of Things" alt. title: "Tomorrow's Child"	Thrilling Wonder Stories, February 1948		
"The October Game"	Weird Tales, March 1948	comic-strip: Shock Suspenstories 9, '53	
"Powerhouse"	Charm, Mar. -48		
"Jonah of the Jove Run"	Planet Stories, spring 1948		manuscript title: "The Calculator"
"The Black Ferris" alt. title: "The Ferris Wheel"	Weird Tales, May 1948	revised/bridged into: Something Wicked This Way Comes ('62), chapter 18 comic-strip 1: The Haunt of Fear 18, '53 comic-strip 2: The House of Mystery 221, '74	
"...And the Moon be Still as Bright" alt. title: "—And the Moon Be Still as Bright" "June 2001:—And the Moon be Still as Bright"	Thrilling Wonder Stories, June 1948	revised: The Martian Chronicles ('50)	
"Pillar of Fire"	Planet Stories, summer 1948		
"The Earth Men" alt. titles: "The Great Hallucination" (combined with "The Spring Night") "Danger Wears Three Faces" (combined with "The Spring Night") "August 1999: The Earth Men"	Thrilling Wonder Stories, August 1948		
"Fever Dream"	Weird Tales, September 1948		based on "Wilber and His Germ (1941)"
"End of Summer"	??		
"Dwellers in Silence" alt. titles: "The Long Years" "April 2026: The Long Years"	??		
"Mars Is Heaven!" alt. titles: "The Third Expedition" "April 2000: The Third Expedition" "Welcome Brothers" "While Earthmen Sleep"	Planet Stories, fall 1948	revised: The Martian Chronicles ('50) comic-strip 1: Weird Science 18, '53 comic-strip 2: West, '72, together with "Ylla"	influenced Stephen King's Bag of Bones
"Referent"	Thrilling Wonder Stories, October 1948	revised: The Day It Rained Forever ('59) revised: Imagination Unlimited ('52)	as Brett Sterling
"The Square Pegs"	Thrilling Wonder Stories, October 1948		
"The Women"	Famous Fantastic Mysteries, October 1948		
"The Visitor"	Startling Stories, November 1948	comic-strip: Ray Bradbury's The Illustrated Man Special 1, '93	
"The Off Season" alt. title: "November 2005: The Off Season"	Thrilling Wonder Stories, December 1948	revised: The Martian Chronicles ('50) comic-strip: Ray Bradbury's Martian Chronicles Spaceman Special, June '94	
"Asleep in Armageddon" alt. title: "Perchance to Dream"	Planet Stories, winter 1948		
"Touch and Go" alt. title: "The Fruit at the Bottom of the Bowl"	Detective Book, winter 1948	comic-strip: Crime Suspenstories 17, '53	

=== 1949 ===
Title	Originally published in	Versions	Notes
"The Spring Night" alt. titles: "The Great Hallucination" (combined with "The Earth Men") "Danger Wears Three Faces" (combined with "The Earth Men") "August 2005: The Summer Night"	Arkham Sampler 2, winter -49	revised: The Martian Chronicles (-50)	
"The Man"	Thrilling Wonder Stories, Feb. -49	comic-strip: Kaleidoscope 1, -67	
"The Great Fire"	Seventeen, Mar. -49		
"The Silent Towns" alt. title: December 2005: The Silent Towns"	Charm, Mar. -49	revised: The Martian Chronicles (-50) comic-strip: Weird Fantasy 22, -53	
"Marionettes, Inc." alt. titles: "Synthetic Alibi" "No Strings Attached" "Wondercopy"	Startling Stories, Mar. -49		
"Night Call, Collect"	??		
"The One Who Waits" alt. title: "Vignettes of Tomorrow" (combined with "Holiday")	Arkham Sampler, summer -49		
"The Concrete Mixer"	Thrilling Wonder Stories, Apr. -49		
"I, Mars"	Super Science Stories, Apr. -49		
"The Lonely Ones"	Startling Stories, Jul. -49		
"Changeling"	Super Science Stories, Jul. -49		
"The Naming of Names" alt. title: "Dark They Were, and Golden-Eyed"	Thrilling Wonder Stories, Aug. -49		not to be confused with "2004-05: The Naming of Names (-50)"
"Holiday" alt. title: "Vignettes of Tomorrow" (combined with "The One Who Waits")	Arkham Sampler, autumn -49		
"The Mad Wizards of Mars" alt. title: "The Exiles"	Maclean's, Sep. 15, -49	revised 1: Magazine of Fantasy and Science Fiction, winter-spring -50 revised 2: The Illustrated Man (-51) revised from revision 1: The Witchcraft Reader (-69)	
"Kaleidoscope" alt. title: "Home to Stay" (combined with "The Rocket Man")	Thrilling Wonder Stories, Oct. -49	revised: The Illustrated Man (-51) comic-strip 1: Weird Fantasy 13, -52 comic-strip 2: Ray Bradbury's Martian Chronicles Spaceman Special, Jun. -94	
"Impossible" alt. titles: "The Martian" "September 2005: The Martian"	Super Science Stories, Nov. -49		
"A Blade of Grass"	Thrilling Wonder Stories, Dec. -49		

== 1950s ==
=== 1950 ===
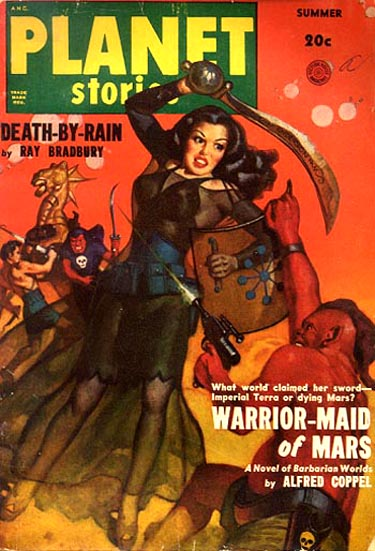

Title	Originally published in	Versions	Notes
"I'll Not Ask for Wine" alt. titles: "I'll Not Look for Wine" "Ylla" "February 1999: Ylla"	Maclean's, Jan. 1, -50	revised: Avon Fantasy Reader 14, -50 comic-strip: West (Los Angeles Times), Mar. 12, -72, together with "Mars Is Heaven!"	
"All on a Summer's Night"	(Philadelphia Inquirer) Today, Jan. 22, -50		
"Payment in Full"	Thrilling Wonder Stories, Feb. -50		
"Outcast of the Stars" alt. title: "The Rocket"	Super Science Stories, Mar. -50	comic-strip: Weird Science 22, -53	
"Punishment Without Crime"	Other Worlds, Mar. -50	comic-strip 1: Weird Science 21, -53 comic-strip 2: The Ray Bradbury Chronicles 2, -92	manuscript title: "Behold, Thou Art Fair"
"The Highway"	Copy, spring -50		as Leonard Spalding
"Forever and the Earth"	Planet Stories, spring -50		
"Carnival of Madness" alt. titles: "Usher II" "April 2005: Usher II" "The Second House of Usher" "The Immortality of Horror"	Thrilling Wonder Stories, Apr. -50	revised: The Martian Chronicles -50 comic-strip: Ray Bradbury Comics 4, -93	
"Miss Bidwell" alt. title: "A Far Away Guitar"	Charm, Apr. -50		
"December 2001: The Green Morning" alt. title: "December 2001: The Green Mountains"	The Martian Chronicles -50		
"August 2002: Night Meeting" alt. title: "Night Meeting"	The Martian Chronicles -50	comic-strip: The Ray Bradbury Chronicles 2, -92	
"June 2003: Way in the Middle of the Air" alt. titles: "Way in the Middle of the Air" "The Day the Negroes Left Earth"	The Martian Chronicles -50		
"There Will Come Soft Rains" alt. title: "August 2026: There Will Come Soft Rains"	Collier's, May 6, -50	long version: The Martian Chronicles -50	published as a "short-short" feature
"The Window" alt. title: "Calling Mexico"	Collier's, Aug. 5, -50		published as a "short-short" feature
"The Whole Town's Sleeping"	McCall's, Sep. -50		
"Season of Disbelief"	Collier's, Nov. 25, -50		
"January 1999: Rocket Summer"	The Martian Chronicles -50		not to be confused with "Rocket Summer (-47)"
"February 2003: Interim" alt. title: "Interim"	The Martian Chronicles -50		not to be confused with "Interim [i/ii] (-47)"
"February 2002: The Locusts" alt. title: "The Locusts"	The Martian Chronicles -50		
"November 2005: The Luggage Store" alt. title: "The Luggage Store"	The Martian Chronicles -50		
"April 2003: The Musicians" alt. title: "The Musicians"	The Martian Chronicles -50		
"August 2005: The Old Ones" alt. title: "The Old Ones"	The Martian Chronicles -50		
"August 2001: The Settlers" alt. title: "The Settlers"	The Martian Chronicles -50		
"October 2002: The Shore" alt. title: "The Shore"	The Martian Chronicles -50		
"March 2000: The Taxpayer" alt. title: "The Taxpayer"	The Martian Chronicles -50		
"2004-05: The Naming of Names" alt. title: "The Naming of Names"	The Martian Chronicles -50		not to be confused with "The Naming of Names (-49)"
"November 2005: The Watchers" alt. title: "The Watchers [ii]"	The Martian Chronicles -50		not to be confused with "The Watchers [i] (-45)"
"Death-by-Rain" alt. title: "The Long Rain"	Planet Stories, summer -50		
"Bonfire"	Torquasian Times, winter -50/51		
"To the Future" alt. title: "The Fox and the Forest"	Collier's, May 13, -50		
"Purpose" alt. title: "The City"	Startling Stories, Jul. -50		
"The Illustrated Man"	Esquire, Jul. -50		
"Death-Wish" alt. title: "The Blue Bottle"	Planet Stories, fall -50		
"The Veldt" alt. title: "The World the Children Made"	The Saturday Evening Post, Sep. 23, -50		

=== 1951 ===
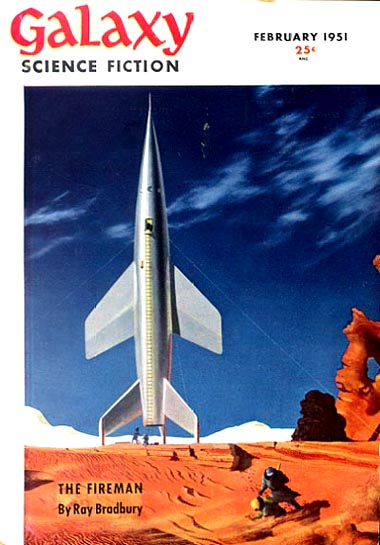

Title	Originally published in	Versions	Notes
"A Story of Love" alt. title: "A Story of Love"	McCall's, May -51		
"The Pumpernickel"	Collier's, May 19, -51		published as a "short-short" feature
"The Screaming Woman"	Today, May 27, -51		
"The Green Machine"	Argosy (UK), Mar. -51		
"The Season of Sitting"	Charm, Aug. -51		
"The Fireman"	Galaxy Science Fiction, Feb. -51		evolved into the novel Fahrenheit 451
"In This Sign..." alt. title: "The Fire Balloons"	Imagination, Apr. -51		
"No Particular Night or Morning"	The Illustrated Man -51		
"The Last Night of the World"	??		
"The Other Foot"	New Story Magazine, Mar. -51		
"The Rocket Man"	Maclean's, Mar. 1, -51		
"The Beast from 20,000 Fathoms" alt. title: "The Fog Horn"	The Saturday Evening Post, Jun. 23, -51		
"A Little Journey"	Galaxy Science Fiction, Aug. -51		
"The Pedestrian"	The Reporter, Aug. 7, -51		
"Embroidery"	Marvel Science Fiction, Nov. -51		
"Here There Be Tygers"	New Tales of Space and Time (-51; revised)	original: Amazing Stories, Apr.-May -53	

=== 1952 ===
Title	Originally published in	Versions	Notes
"A Flight of Ravens"	California Quarterly, winter -51		manuscript title: "A Short Wait between Lives"
"The April Witch" alt. title: "The Wandering Witch"	The Saturday Evening Post, Apr. 5, -52	rewritten: From the Dust Returned (-2001), chapter comic-strip: Ray Bradbury Comics 5, -93	
"The Wilderness" alt. title: "Honeymoon on Mars"	(Philadelphia Inquirer) Today, Apr. 6, -52	rewritten: Magazine of Fantasy and Science Fiction, Nov. -52	
"The Lawns of Summer"	Nation's Business, May -52		
"Love Contest"	The Saturday Evening Post, May 23, -52		as Leonard Douglas
"A Piece of Wood"	Esquire, Jun. -52	comic-strip: The Ray Bradbury Chronicles 2, -92	
"The Playground"	The Illustrated Man (-51)		
"A Sound of Thunder"	Collier's, Jun. 28 -52 (edited)	restored: All-Story Braille Magazine, Apr.-May, -53 revised from restored: The Golden Apples of the Sun (-53) comic-strip 1: Weird Science-Fantasy 25, -54 comic-strip 2: Ray Bradbury Comics 1, Feb. -93	
"The Smile"	Fantastic, summer -52		adapted from final chapter of unpublished novel Where Ignorant Armies Clash by Night
"The Secret"	IT, summer -52		written in -40
"Cora and the Great Wide World" alt. title: "The Great Wide World Over There"	Maclean's (Canada), Aug. 15, -52		
"The Tombling Day"	Shenandoah, fall -52		
"Torrid Sacrifice"	Cavalier, Nov. -52		
"The Gift"	Esquire, Dec. -52		

=== 1953 ===
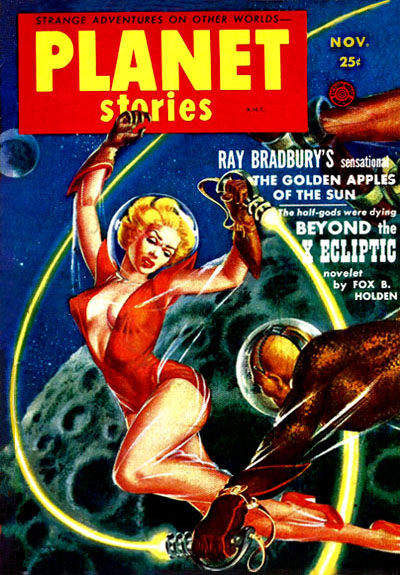

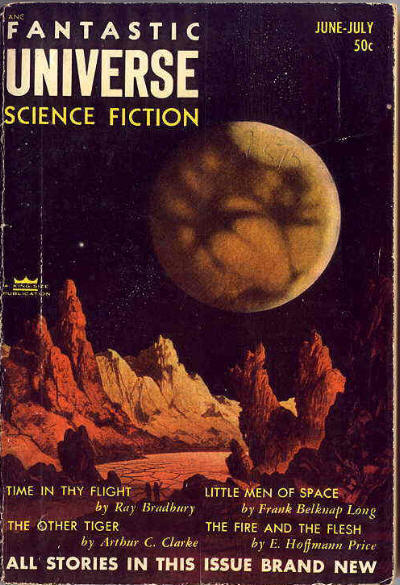

Title	Originally published in	Versions	Notes
"The Golden Kite, the Silver Wind"	Epoch, winter -53		
"Welcome, Brothers!"	Authentic Science Fiction Monthly, Jan. -53		
"A Scent of Sarsaparilla"	Star Science Fiction Stories, Feb. -53		
"Sun and Shadow"	Reporter, Mar. 17, -53		
"The Flying Machine"	The Golden Apples of the Sun (-53)		
"The Garbage Collector"	The Golden Apples of the Sun (-53)		
"The Golden Apples of the Sun"	The Golden Apples of the Sun (-53)		
"The Murderer"	The Golden Apples of the Sun (-53)		
"The Meadow"	The Golden Apples of the Sun (-53)		
"Hail and Farewell"	(Philadelphia Inquirer) Today, Mar. 29, -53		
"Dandelion Wine"	Gourmet, Jun. -53		
"And So Died Riabouchinska"	"The Saint Detective Magazine", Jun.-Jul. -53		based on an unpublished radio script from -47
"Time in Thy Flight"	Fantastic Universe, Jun.-Jul. -53		
"The Millionth Murder" alt. title: "And the Rock Cried Out"	Manhunt, Sep. -53	rewritten: Fahrenheit 451 (-53)	

=== 1954 ===
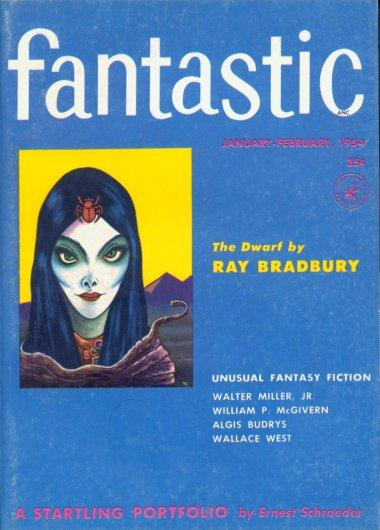

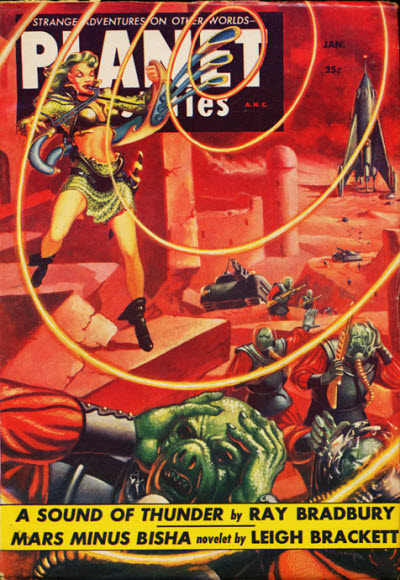

Title	Originally published in	Versions	Notes
"The Marriage Mender"	Collier's, Jan. 22, -54		published as a "short-short" feature
"The Dwarf"	Fantastic, Jan.-Feb. -54		
"Dinner at Dawn"	Everywoman's, Feb. -54		
"All Summer in a Day"	Magazine of Fantasy and Science Fiction, Mar. -54		
"Interval in Sunlight"	Esquire, Mar. -54	revised: Long After Midnight (-76)	
"The Watchful Poker Chip" alt. title: "The Watchful Poker Chip of H. Matisse"	Beyond, Mar. -54		
"At Midnight, in the Month of June"	Ellery Queen's Mystery Magazine, Jun. -54		
"Touched with Fire" alt. title: "Touched With Fire"	Maclean's (Canada), Jun. 1, -54		
"The Wonderful Death of Dudley Stone"	Charm, Jul. -54		
"The Swan"	Cosmopolitan, Sep. -54		

=== 1955 ===
Title	Originally published in	Versions	Notes
"The Last, the Very Last" alt. title: "The Time Machine"	The Reporter, Jun. 2, -55		
"The Trolley"	Good Housekeeping, Jul. -55		
"The Mice" alt. title: "The Little Mice"	??		
"The Strawberry Window"	Star Science Fiction Stories 3, Jan. -55		
"The Dragon"	The Magazine of Fantasy and Science Fiction, Mar. -55		

=== 1956 ===
Title	Originally published in	Versions	Notes
"Summer in the Air" alt. title: "The Sound of Summer Running"	The Saturday Evening Post, Feb. 18, -56		
"The First Night of Lent"	Playboy, Mar. -56		
"Icarus Montgolfier Wright"	Magazine of Fantasy and Science Fiction, May -56		
"Next Stop, the Stars" alt. title: "The End of the Beginning"	Maclean's (Canada), Oct. 27, -56		
"The Time of Going Away"	The Reporter, Nov. 29, -56		

=== 1957 ===
Title	Originally published in	Versions	Notes
"In a Season of Calm Weather" alt. titles: "Picasso Summer" "Sea Change"	Playboy, Jan. -57	Comic-strip: Ray Bradbury Comics 5, Oct. -93; Feature film: The Picasso Summer (1969)	
"Illumination" alt. title: "The Subtlest of Incidents"	The Reporter, May 16, -57		
"Good-by, Grandma" alt. titles: "The Leave-Taking" "Great-Grandma" "Hail and Farewell to Grandma" "Grandma"	The Saturday Evening Post, May 25, -57		
"The Day It Rained Forever"	Harper's, Jul. -57		
["Exorcism"]	Dandelion Wine (-57), untitled		Prepublication title: "Magic!"
["Green Wine for Dreaming"]	Dandelion Wine (-57), untitled		
["Statues"] alt. titles: "Good Grief" "Statues Are Best"	Dandelion Wine (-57), untitled		
["The Tarot Witch"]	Dandelion Wine (-57), untitled		
"The Happiness Machine"	The Saturday Evening Post, Sep. 14, -57		
"Almost the End of the World"	The Reporter, Dec. 26, -57		

=== 1958 ===
Title	Originally published in	Versions	Notes
"The Great Collision of Monday Last"	??		
"The Headpiece"	??		
"The Magic White Suit" alt. title: "The Wonderful Ice Cream Suit"	The Saturday Evening Post, Oct. 4, -58		
"The Town Where No One Got Off"	Ellery Queen's Mystery Magazine, Oct. -58		

=== 1959 ===
Title	Originally published in	Versions	Notes
"A Medicine for Melancholy"	A Medicine for Melancholy (-59)		
"The Shoreline at Sunset" alt. title: "The Sunset Harp"	Magazine of Fantasy and Science Fiction, Mar. -59		
"A Wild Night in Galway" alt. title: "Wild in Galway"	Harper's, Aug. -59		typescript title: "A Wild Night in Ireland"

== 1960s ==
=== 1960 ===
Title	Originally published in	Versions	Notes
"Forever Voyage" alt. title: "Ant the Sailor, Home from the Sea"	The Saturday Evening Post, Jan. 9, -60		
"Death and the Maiden"	Magazine of Fantasy and Science Fiction, Mar. -60		
"The Drummer Boy of Shiloh"	The Saturday Evening Post, Apr. 30 -60		
"The Best of All Possible Worlds"	Playboy, Aug. -60	reprinted in Playboy's Stories for Swinging Readers. 1969	
"Some Live Like Lazarus" alt. title: "Very Late in the Evening"	Playboy, Dec. -60		
"The Beggar on Dublin Bridge" alt. title: "The Beggar on O'Connell Bridge"	The Saturday Evening Post, Jan. 14 -61		
"The Terrible Conflagration Up at the Place"	I Sing The Body Electric, (-69)	revised/bridged into: Green Shadows, White Whale ('92)	

=== 1962 ===
Title	Originally published in	Versions	Notes
"The Prehistoric Producer" alt. title: "Tyrannosaurus Rex"	The Saturday Evening Post, 23 June 1962		
"Come into My Cellar" alt. title: "Boys! Raise Giant Mushrooms in Your Cellar!"	Galaxy Science Fiction, October 1962		

=== 1963 ===
Title	Originally published in	Versions	Notes
"The Life Work of Juan Dias"	Playboy, September 1963		

=== 1964 ===
Title	Originally published in	Versions	Notes
"Heavy-Set" alt. title: "Heavy Set"	Playboy, October 1964		

=== 1965 ===
Title	Originally published in	Versions	Notes
"The Machines, Beyond Shylock"	Galaxy Science Fiction, October 1965		Poem

=== 1969 ===
Title	Originally published in	Versions	Notes
"The Inspired Chicken Motel"	1969		
"Yes, We'll Gather at the River"	1969		

== 1970s ==
=== 1971 ===
Title	Originally published in	Versions	Notes
"McGillahee's Brat"	1970		

=== 1971 ===
Title	Originally published in	Versions	Notes
"The Utterly Perfect Murder"	1971		

=== 1972 ===
Title	Originally published in	Versions	Notes
"The Parrot Who Met Papa"	1972		

=== 1976 ===
Title	Originally published in	Versions	Notes
"Have I Got a Chocolate Bar for You!"	1976		
"The Better Part of Wisdom"	1976		

=== 1978 ===
Title	Originally published in	Versions	Notes
"Gotcha!"	Redbook, August 1978		

=== 1979 ===
Title	Originally published in	Versions	Notes
"The Aqueduct"	1979		first published as a chapbook
