= Twice 22 =

1966 collection of short stories by Ray Bradbury

- Dust-jacket illustration from the first edition
- Author: Ray Bradbury
- Language: English
- Genre: Soft science fiction
- Publisher: Doubleday & Company
- Publication date: 1966
- Publication place: United States
- Media type: Print (hardback)
- Pages: 406

Twice 22 is a collection of short stories by American writer Ray Bradbury. The book, published in 1966, is an omnibus edition of The Golden Apples of the Sun and A Medicine for Melancholy. It is titled Twice 22 on the book's dustjacket and spine, but titled Twice Twenty-two on the book's title page.

== Contents ==
- The Golden Apples of the Sun
  - "The Fog Horn"
  - "The Pedestrian"
  - "The April Witch"
  - "The Wilderness"
  - "The Fruit at the Bottom of the Bowl"
  - "Invisible Boy"
  - "The Flying Machine"
  - "The Murderer"
  - "The Golden Kite, The Silver Wind"
  - "I See You Never"
  - "Embroidery"
  - "The Big Black and White Game"
  - "A Sound of Thunder"
  - "The Great Wide World Over There"
  - "Powerhouse"
  - "En La Noche"
  - "Sun and Shadow"
  - "The Meadow"
  - "The Garbage Collector"
  - "The Great Fire"
  - "Hail and Farewell"
  - "The Golden Apples of the Sun"
- A Medicine for Melancholy
  - "In a Season of Calm Weather"
  - "The Dragon"
  - "A Medicine for Melancholy"
  - "The End of the Beginning"
  - "The Wonderful Ice Cream Suit"
  - "Fever Dream"
  - "The Marriage Mender"
  - "The Town Where No One Got Off"
  - "A Scent of Sarsaparilla"
  - "Icarus Montgolfier Wright"
  - "The Headpiece"
  - "Dark They Were, and Golden-Eyed"
  - "The Smile"
  - "The First Night of Lent"
  - "The Time of Going Away"
  - "All Summer in a Day"
  - "The Gift"
  - "The Great Collision of Monday Last"
  - "The Little Mice"
  - "The Shoreline at Sunset"
  - "The Strawberry Window"
  - "The Day It Rained Forever"
