= The Stories of Ray Bradbury =

1980 anthology containing 100 short stories by Ray Bradbury

Ray Bradbury
- dust-jacket from the first edition
- Author: Ray Bradbury
- Language: English
- Genre: Science fiction, fantasy, horror
- Publisher: Knopf
- Publication date: 1980
- Media type: Print (hardback)
- Pages: 912
- ISBN: 0-394-51335-5
- OCLC: 6222486
- Dewey Decimal: 813/.54
- LC Class: PS3503.R167 A6 1980

The Stories of Ray Bradbury is an anthology containing 100 short stories by American writer Ray Bradbury, first published by Knopf in 1980. The hundred stories, written from 1943 to 1980, were selected by the author. Bradbury's work had previously been collected in various compilations, such as The Martian Chronicles and The October Country, but never in such a large volume (912 pages) or spanning such a long period of time.

In 2003, Bradbury Stories: 100 of His Most Celebrated Tales was published, containing a further 100 stories from later in his career. The two anthologies have entirely different contents.

== Contents ==
- "The Night", 1946
- "Homecoming", 1946
- "Uncle Einar", 1947
- "The Traveler", 1946
- "The Lake", 1944
- "The Coffin", 1947
- "The Crowd", 1943.
- "The Scythe", 1943
- "There Was an Old Woman", 1944
- "There Will Come Soft Rains", 1950
- "Mars Is Heaven!", 1948
- "The Silent Towns", 1949
- "The Earth Men", 1948
- "The Off Season", 1948
- "The Million-Year Picnic", 1946
- "The Fox and the Forest", 1950
- "Kaleidoscope", 1949
- "The Rocket Man", 1951
- "Marionettes, Inc.", 1949
- "No Particular Night or Morning", 1951
- "The City", 1950
- "The Fire Balloons", 1951
- "The Last Night of the World", 1951
- "The Veldt", 1950
- "The Long Rain", 1950
- "The Great Fire", 1949
- "The Wilderness", 1952
- "A Sound of Thunder", 1952
- "The Murderer", 1953
- "The April Witch", 1952
- "Invisible Boy", 1945
- "The Golden Kite, the Silver Wind", 1953
- "The Fog Horn", 1951.
- "The Big Black and White Game", 1945
- "Embroidery", 1951
- "The Golden Apples of the Sun", 1953
- "Powerhouse", 1948
- "Hail and Farewell", 1948
- "The Great Wide World Over There", 1952
- "The Playground", 1953
- "Skeleton", 1943
- "The Man Upstairs", 1947
- "Touched with Fire", 1954
- "The Emissary", 1947
- "The Jar", 1944
- "The Small Assassin", 1946
- "The Next in Line", 1947
- "Jack-in-the-Box", 1947
- "The Leave-Taking", 1957
- "Exorcism", 1957
- "The Happiness Machine", 1957
- "Calling Mexico", 1950
- "The Wonderful Ice Cream Suit", 1958
- "Dark They Were, and Golden-Eyed", 1949
- "The Strawberry Window", 1954
- "A Scent of Sarsaparilla", 1953
- "The Picasso Summer", 1957
- "The Day It Rained Forever", 1957
- "A Medicine for Melancholy", 1959
- "The Shoreline at Sunset", 1959
- "Fever Dream", 1959
- "The Town Where No One Got Off", 1958
- "All Summer in a Day", 1954
- "Frost and Fire", 1946
- "The Anthem Sprinters", 1963
- "And So Died Riabouchinska", 1953
- "Boys! Raise Giant Mushrooms in Your Cellar!", 1962
- "The Vacation", 1963
- "The Illustrated Woman", 1961
- "Some Live Like Lazarus", 1960
- "The Best of All Possible Worlds", 1960
- "The One Who Waits", 1949
- "Tyrannosaurus Rex", 1962
- "The Screaming Woman", 1951
- "The Terrible Conflagration Up at the Place", 1969.
- "Night Call, Collect", 1949
- "The Tombling Day", 1952
- "The Haunting of the New", 1969
- "Tomorrow's Child", 1948
- "I Sing the Body Electric!", 1969
- "The Women", 1948
- "The Inspired Chicken Motel", 1969
- "Yes, We'll Gather at the River", 1969
- "Have I Got a Chocolate Bar for You!", 1976
- "A Story of Love", 1951
- "The Parrot Who Met Papa", 1972
- "The October Game", 1948
- "Punishment Without Crime", 1950
- "A Piece of Wood", 1952
- "The Blue Bottle", 1950
- "Long After Midnight", 1962
- "The Utterly Perfect Murder", 1971
- "The Better Part of Wisdom", 1976
- "Interval in Sunlight", 1954
- "The Black Ferris", 1948
- "Farewell Summer", 1980 (first publication)
- "McGillahee's Brat", 1970
- "The Aqueduct", 1979
- "Gotcha!" 1978
- "The End of the Beginning", 1956
