= The Collected Stories of Ray Bradbury =

Multi-volume edition of Bradbury's stories

- First edition cover (Volume 1)
- Volumes 1, 2, and 3
- Edited by: William F. Touponce, Jonathan R. Eller
- Discipline: Fantasy, Horror, Science fiction
- Publisher: Kent State University Press

The Collected Stories of Ray Bradbury is a projected eight-volume scholarly publication by Kent State University Press aiming to collect every short story published by Ray Bradbury, presented in chronological order with textual apparatuses, edited by professors William F. Touponce and Jonathan R. Eller. The publication is approved by the Modern Language Association.

== Contents ==
=== Volume 1 ===
Copy of the fantasy fiction magazine Avon Fantasy Reader no. 11 (1949) featuring "Asleep in Armageddon" by Ray Bradbury

The first volume, The Collected Stories of Ray Bradbury: A Critical Edition – Volume 1, 1938–1943 (ISBN 978-1606350713), was published on February 21, 2011.

1. "Pendulum" (with Henry Hasse; 1941)
2. "Gabriel's Horn" (with Henry Hasse; 1941, published 1943)
3. "Final Victim" (with Henry Hasse; 1941, published 1946)
4. "The Piper" (1941, published 1943)
5. "The Candle" (1942)
6. "Is That You, Bert?" ("Is That You, Herb?") (1942, published 2003)
7. "The Wind" (1942, published 1943)
8. "Eat, Drink and Be Wary" (1942)
9. "Promotion to Satellite" (1942, published 1943)
10. "The Crowd" (1942, published 1943)
11. "Chrysalis" (1942, published 1946)
12. "Subterfuge" (1942, published 1943)
13. "The Parallel" ("A Blade of Grass") (1942, published 1949)
14. "And Then—The Silence" (1942, published 1944)
15. "The Lake" (1942, published 1944)
16. "Morgue Ship" (1943, published 1944)
17. "Tomorrow and Tomorrow" (1943, published 1947)
18. "The Monster Maker" (1943, published 1944)
19. "King of the Gray Spaces" ("R Is for Rocket") (1943)
20. "The Scythe" (1943)
21. "I, Rocket" (1943, published 1944)
22. "Undersea Guardians" (1943, published 1944)
23. "The Small Assassin" (1943, published 1946)

==== Appendix ====
1. "Hollerbochen's Dilemma" (1938)
2. "Hollerbochen Comes Back" (1938)
3. "Don't Get Technatal" (1939)
4. "The Pendulum" (first version, 1939)
5. "Luana the Living" (1940)
6. "The Piper" (first version, 1940)
7. "It's Not the Heat, It's the Hu—" (1940)
8. "The Secret" (1940)
9. "Tale of the Mangledomvritch" (1941)

=== Volume 2 ===
The Collected Stories of Ray Bradbury: A Critical Edition – Volume 2, 1943–1944 (ISBN 978-1606351956), was published in September, 2014.

1. "The Sea Shell" (1943, published 1944)
2. "Everything Instead of Something" ("Doodad") (1943)
3. "The Ducker" (1943)
4. "The Shape of Things" ("Tomorrow's Child") (1943, published 1948)
5. "The Night" (1943, published 1946)
6. "Perchance to Dream" ("Asleep in Armageddon") (1943, published 1948)
7. "Referent" (1943, published 1948)
8. "The Calculator" ("Jonah of the Jove Run") (1943, published 1948)
9. "The Emissary" (1943, published 1947)
10. "And Watch the Fountains" (1943)
11. "The Million Year Picnic" (1943, published 1946)
12. "The Man Upstairs" (1943, published 1944)
13. "Autopsy" ("Killer, Come Back to Me!") (1943, published 1944)
14. "The Long Night" (1943, published 1944)
15. "Lazarus Come Forth" (1943, published 1944)
16. "There Was an Old Woman" (1943, published 1944)
17. "The Trunk Lady" (1943, published 1944)
18. "Jack-in-the-Box" (1944, published 1947)
19. "Where Everything Ends" (1944, published 2010)
20. "Bang! You're Dead!" (1944)
21. "Enter - the Douser" ("Half-Pint Homicide") (1944)
22. "Rocket Skin" (1944, published 1946)
23. "Forgotten Man" ("It Burns Me Up!") (1944)
24. "The Jar" (1944)

=== Volume 3 ===
The third volume, The Collected Stories of Ray Bradbury: A Critical Edition - Volume 3, 1944-1945 (ISBN 978-1-60635-071-3), was published in May, 2017.

1. "No Phones, Private Coffin" ("Yesterday I Lived!) (1944)
2. "If Paths Must Cross Again" (1944, published 2009)
3. "The Miracles of Jamie" (1944, published 1946)
4. "The Long Way Around" ("The Long Way Home") (1944, published 1945)
5. "The Very Bewildered Corpses ("Four-Way Funeral") (1944)
6. "The Reincarnate" (1944, published 2005)
7. "Chrysalis" (1944, published 2004)
8. "The Poems" (1944, published 1945)
9. "Defense Mech" (1944, published 1946)
10. "Mr. Priory Meets Mr. Caldwell" ("Hell's Half-Hour") (1944, published 1945)
11. "'I'm Not So Dumb'" (1944, published 1945)
12. "Invisible Boy" (1944, published 1945)
13. "Ylla" ("I'll Not Ask for Wine") (1944, published 1945)
14. "The Tombstone" (1944, published 1945)
15. "The Watchers" (1944, published 1945)
16. "Lorelei of the Red Mist" (1944, published 1946)
17. "One Minus One" ("Corpse-Carnival") (1944, published 1945)
18. "The Sea Cure" ("Dead Men Rise Up Never") (1944, published 1945)
19. "Skeleton" (1944, published 1945, distinct from 45-5)
20. "Riabouchinska" ("And So Died Riabouchinska") (1945, published 1953)
21. "Skeleton" (1945, distinct from 45-11)
22. "The Black Ferris" (1945, full draft sent to Congdon, Sept. 19, 1947)
