= The Vintage Bradbury =

1965 short story collection by Ray Bradbury

- First edition
- Author: Ray Bradbury
- Language: English
- Genre: Fantasy, horror, science fiction
- Publisher: Vintage
- Publication date: 1965
- Publication place: United States
- Media type: Print (paperback)
- Pages: v, 329 pp
- ISBN: 0-394-70294-8 (paperback reprint)

The Vintage Bradbury (1965) was the first "best of" collection of the stories of Ray Bradbury, as selected by the author. It was published by Vintage Books, a paperback division of Random House.

== Contents ==
- "The Watchful Poker Chip of H. Matisse"
- "The Veldt"
- "Hail and Farewell"
- "A Medicine for Melancholy"
- "The Fruit at the Bottom of the Bowl"
- "Ylla"
- "The Little Mice"
- "The Small Assassin"
- "The Anthem Sprinters"
- "And the Rock Cried Out"
- "Invisible Boy"
- "Night Meeting"
- "The Fox and the Forest"
- "Skeleton"
- Selections from Dandelion Wine
  - "Illumination"
  - "Dandelion Wine"
  - "Statues"
  - "Green Wine for Dreaming"
- "Kaleidoscope"
- "Sun and Shadow"
- "The Illustrated Man"
- "The Fog Horn"
- "The Dwarf"
- "Fever Dream"
- "The Wonderful Ice Cream Suit"
- "There Will Come Soft Rains"
