= Classic Stories 2 =

Collection of short stories by Ray Bradbury

- cover of first edition
- Author: Ray Bradbury
- Cover artist: Don Maitz
- Language: English
- Genre: Science fiction, fantasy, horror short stories
- Publisher: Bantam Books
- Publication date: 1990
- Publication place: United States
- Media type: Print (paperback)
- Pages: 341
- ISBN: 0-553-28638-2
- OCLC: 21507555

Classic Stories 2: From A Medicine for Melancholy and S Is for Space is a semi-omnibus edition of two short story collections by American writer Ray Bradbury, A Medicine for Melancholy and S is for Space. Stories from the original collections that are included in Classic Stories 1 are omitted.

In 1998, Avon Books reprinted this collection as A Medicine for Melancholy and Other Stories.

== Contents ==
- "In a Season of Calm Weather"
- "A Medicine for Melancholy"
- "The Wonderful Ice Cream Suit"
- "Fever Dream"
- "The Marriage Mender"
- "The Town Where No One Got Off"
- "A Scent of Sarsaparilla"
- "The Headpiece"
- "The First Night of Lent"
- "The Time of Going Away"
- "All Summer in a Day"
- "The Gift"
- "The Great Collision of Monday Last"
- "The Little Mice"
- "The Shoreline at Sunset"
- "The Day It Rained Forever"
- "Chrysalis"
- "Pillar of Fire"
- "Zero Hour"
- "The Man"
- "Time in Thy Flight"
- "The Pedestrian"
- "Hail and Farewell"
- "Invisible Boy"
- "Come into My Cellar"
- "The Million-Year Picnic"
- "The Screaming Woman"
- "The Smile"
- "Dark They Were, and Golden-Eyed"
- "The Trolley"
- "Icarus Montgolfier Wright"
