= Ray Bradbury (short story collection) =

1975 Ray Bradbury short story collection

- First edition cover
- Author: Ray Bradbury
- Language: English
- Genre: Science fiction, fantasy, horror
- Published: 1975 Harrap
- Publication place: United Kingdom
- Media type: Print (hardback)
- Pages: 188
- ISBN: 0-245-52746-X
- OCLC: 2090106
- Dewey Decimal: 813/.5/4
- LC Class: PZ3.B72453 Ray3 PS3503.R167

Ray Bradbury is a collection of science fiction short stories by Ray Bradbury edited by Anthony Adams and published by Harrap in 1975.

== Contents ==
- Introduction, by Anthony Adams
- "The Veldt"
- "Let’s Play 'Poison'"
- "All Summer in a Day"
- "Fever Dream"
- "Zero Hour"
- "The Fog Horn"
- "A Sound of Thunder"
- "The Wind"
- "The Scythe"
- "Marionettes, Inc."
- "The Other Foot"
- "The Pedestrian"
- "The Trolley"
- "The Smile"
- "The Gift"
- "The Last Night of the World"
- For Discussion, essay by Anthony Adams
- Ray Bradbury—His Work, essay by Anthony Adams
- Further Reading, essay by Anthony Adams
