= The Golden Apples of the Sun =

1953 short story anthology by Ray Bradbury

- Dust jacket of the first edition
- Author: Ray Bradbury
- Illustrator: Joe Mugnaini
- Language: English
- Genre: Science fiction, fantasy
- Publisher: Doubleday & Company
- Publication date: 1953
- Publication place: United States
- Media type: Print (hardback & paperback)
- Pages: 192
- ISBN: 0-435-12360-2 (Heinemann, 1991)
- OCLC: 59230566
- Dewey Decimal: 813.54
- LC Class: PS3503.R167

The Golden Apples of the Sun is an anthology of 22 short stories by American writer Ray Bradbury. It was published by Doubleday & Company in 1953.

The Golden Apples of the Sun was Bradbury's third published collection of short stories. The first, Dark Carnival, was published by Arkham House in 1947; the second, The Illustrated Man, was published by Doubleday & Company in 1951.

== Title ==
The book's title is also the title of the final story in the collection. The words "the golden apples of the sun" are from the last line of the final stanza of W. B. Yeats' poem "The Song of Wandering Aengus" (1899):

Though I am old with wandering
Through hollow lands and hilly lands,
I will find out where she has gone
And kiss her lips and take her hands;
And walk among long dappled grass,
And pluck till time and times are done
The silver apples of the moon,
The golden apples of the sun.

Bradbury prefaces his book with the last three lines of this poem. When asked what attracted him to the line "the golden apples of the sun", he said, "[My wife] Maggie introduced me to Romantic poetry when we were dating, and I loved it. I love that line in the poem, and it was a metaphor for my story, about taking a cup full of fire from the sun."

== Contents ==
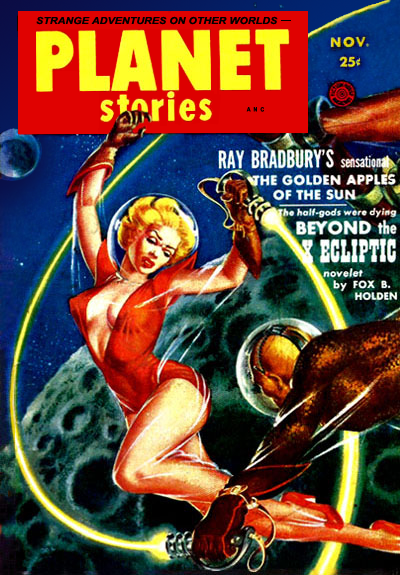
The collection's title story was first published in the November 1953 issue of Planet Stories, a US pulp science fiction magazine.

In 1990, Bantam Books collected most of the stories from R Is for Rocket (1962) and The Golden Apples of the Sun into a semi-omnibus edition titled Classic Stories 1. In 1997, Avon Books printed a new edition of the omnibus, titling it The Golden Apples of the Sun and Other Stories. Harper Perennial titled their 2005 edition as A Sound of Thunder and Other Stories.

The semi-omnibus editions omit three of the stories that appear in The Golden Apples of the Sun: "The Pedestrian" (1951), "Invisible Boy" (1945), and "Hail and Farewell" (1953).

Story	First published	Sequence	
Story	First published	The Golden Apples of the Sun	Classic Stories 1
"The Fog Horn"	1952	1	1
"The Pedestrian"	1951	2	Dropped
"The April Witch"	1951	3	2
"The Wilderness"	1952	4	3
"The Fruit at the Bottom of the Bowl"	1948	5	4
"Invisible Boy"	1945	6	Dropped
"The Flying Machine"	1953	7	5
"The Murderer"	1953	8	6
"The Golden Kite, the Silver Wind"	1953	9	7
"I See You Never"	1947	10	8
"Embroidery"	1951	11	9
"The Big Black and White Game"	1945	12	10
"A Sound of Thunder"	1952	13	23
"The Great Wide World Over There"	1953	14	11
"Powerhouse"	1948	15	12
"En la Noche"	1952	16	13
"Sun and Shadow"	1953	17	14
"The Meadow"	1947	18	15
"The Garbage Collector"	1953	19	16
"The Great Fire"	1949	20	17
"Hail and Farewell"	1953	21	Dropped
"The Golden Apples of the Sun"	1953	22	18
"R Is for Rocket"	1943	—N/a	19
"The End of the Beginning"	1956	—N/a	20
"The Rocket"	1950	—N/a	21
"The Rocket Man"	1953	—N/a	22
"The Long Rain"	1950	—N/a	24
"The Exiles"	1950	—N/a	25
"Here There Be Tygers"	1951	—N/a	26
"The Strawberry Window"	1954	—N/a	27
"The Dragon"	1955	—N/a	28
"Frost and Fire"	1947	—N/a	29
"Uncle Einar"	1947	—N/a	30
"The Time Machine"	1957	—N/a	31
"The Sound of Summer Running"	1957	—N/a	32

== Reception ==
Writing in The New York Times, Charles Poore reported that Bradbury "writes in a style that seems to have been nourished on the poets and fabulists of the Irish Literary Renaissance", and said he was "wonderfully adept at getting to the heart of his story without talking all day long about it and around it."

Anthony Boucher and J. Francis McComas of The Magazine of Fantasy & Science Fiction found Golden Apples to be a "most uncertain reading experience… material of a curiously mixed quality; writing that is often simply and perceptively moving [and] just as often sadly lacking any particular strength or color".

Imagination reviewer Mark Reinsberg called Bradbury "a gifted writer", but complained that he had "a tendency to overestimate the power of style to nourish anemic themes."

Groff Conklin of Galaxy Science Fiction praised the collection, saying it included "some of the best imaginative stories [Bradbury] or anyone else has ever written. One cannot even begin to describe their delights."

== See also ==
- 1953 in literature
- Ray Bradbury bibliography
- Ray Bradbury short fiction bibliography

== Sources ==
- Tuck, Donald H. (1974). The Encyclopedia of Science Fiction and Fantasy. Vol. 1. Chicago: Advent. p. 62. ISBN 0-911682-20-1.
