= The Fog Horn & Other Stories =

1979 short story collection by Ray Bradbury

- Author: Ray Bradbury
- Language: English
- Genre: Science fiction, fantasy, horror short stories
- Publisher: Taiyosha
- Publication date: 1979
- Publication place: Japan
- Media type: Print (paperback)
- Pages: 83 pp

The Fog Horn & Other Stories is a collection of six short stories written by Ray Bradbury. The collection, published in Japan, is published in English for school use.

== Contents ==
- "The Fog Horn"
- "The Dwarf"
- "The Pedestrian"
- "A Sound of Thunder"
- "En La Noche"
- "The Garbage Collector"
