= Conversations with Ray Bradbury =

Conversations with Ray Bradbury is a 2004 book edited by Steven L. Aggelis and published by the University Press of Mississippi.

It is a collection of interviews of Ray Bradbury; Aggelis wrote the introduction. Reviewer James Sallis described it as having a mix of "lengthy" and "standard newspaper stuff". Sallis stated that the latter articles were often "brief and repetitious" while the former were focused on particular areas.

It is a part of the university press's Literary Conversation Series.

Aaron Parrett of the University of Great Falls that the book has the "most revealing" of the body interviews, and that as Bradbury showed favor to submitting to being interviewed, more than 335 were available.

== Reception ==
Parrett stated that the book is "a marvelous conversational interview"; Parrett further wrote that due to having "a more comprehensive and literary" body of information and a superior introductory section, the book "outshines" Conversations with Isaac Asimov even though the latter book is already "bright".

== See also ==
- Ray Bradbury bibliography
