= The Mummies of Guanajuato =

1978 book

- cover the first edition
- Author: Ray Bradbury
- Illustrator: Archie Lieberman
- Cover artist: Archie Lieberman
- Language: English
- Genre: Horror novelette
- Publisher: Harry N. Abrams, Inc.
- Publication date: 1978
- Publication place: United States
- Media type: Print (hardback & paperback)
- Pages: 96 pp
- ISBN: 0-8109-1325-9
- OCLC: 3380409
- Dewey Decimal: 813/.5/4
- LC Class: F1219.1.G86 M85

The Mummies of Guanajuato is a 1978 book which reprints Ray Bradbury's novelette, "The Next in Line", illustrated with photographs, by Archie Lieberman, of the actual mummies discovered in Guanajuato which inspired the story. The story originally appeared in Bradbury's first book, Dark Carnival, in 1947.
