= Selected from Dark They Were, and Golden-Eyed =

- First edition
- Author: Ray Bradbury
- Language: English
- Genre: short story
- Publisher: Signal Hill Publications
- Publication date: 1991
- Publication place: United States
- Media type: Print (paperback)
- Pages: 64 pp
- ISBN: 0-929631-24-2
- OCLC: 24397542

Selected from Dark They Were, and Golden-Eyed is a collection that contains the Ray Bradbury short story "Dark They Were, and Golden-Eyed" with several essays about the story. It was published in 1991 by Signal Hill Publications as part of their Writers' Voices Series for students. The story first appeared in the magazine Thrilling Wonder Stories in 1949.

== Contents ==
- Note to the Reader
- About the Selection Dark They Were and Golden-Eyed
- "Dark They Were, and Golden-Eyed"
- Glossary
- Questions for the Reader
- About Ray Bradbury
- About Science Fiction and Fantasy
- Map of the Solar System
- About Mars
- About Space Travel
