= A Memory of Murder =

1984 collection of short stories by Ray Bradbury

- First edition cover
- Author: Ray Bradbury
- Language: English
- Genre: Mystery
- Publisher: Dell Books
- Publication date: 1984
- Publication place: United States
- Media type: Print (paperback)
- Pages: 192
- ISBN: 0-440-15559-2
- OCLC: 10466614
- LC Class: CPB Box no. 2935 vol. 20

A Memory of Murder (1984) is a collection of fifteen mystery short stories by American writer Ray Bradbury. They were originally published from 1944 to 1948 in pulp magazines owned by Popular Publications, Inc. that specialized in detective and crime fiction. Bradbury tried his hand in the genre but found the results unsatisfactory. He referred to the stories as "the walking wounded" in his introduction to A Memory of Murder.

Although Bradbury would acquire the reprint rights to "The Small Assassin" and "Wake for the Living" (retitled "The Coffin") for his first collection, Dark Carnival, Popular Publications held onto the reprint rights for the remaining stories after Bradbury became a successful author in the 1950s, and none of those thirteen appeared in collections of Bradbury stories over the years. When Bradbury learned that they would be published in a collection in the 1980s, he offered to write an introduction, and to add the two stories he owned, under the agreement that the book would appear in paperback only, and that no subsequent editions would be published after the first edition sold out.

Bradbury returned to the mystery genre in 1985 with the publication of his novel Death Is a Lonely Business, and its two sequels, A Graveyard for Lunatics and Let's All Kill Constance.

== Contents ==
- "The Small Assassin" (1946)
- "A Careful Man Dies" (1946)
- "It Burns Me Up" (1944)
- "Half-Pint Homicide" (1944)
- "Four-Way Funeral" (1944)
- "The Long Night" (1944)
- "Corpse Carnival" (1945)
- "Hell's Half-Hour" (1945)
- "The Long Way Home" (1945)
- "Wake for the Living" (1947)
- "I'm Not So Dumb" (1945)
- "The Trunk Lady" (1944)
- "Yesterday I Lived" (1944)
- "Dead Men Rise Up Never" (1945)
- "The Candy Skull" (1948)

== Sources ==
- Brown, Charles N.; William G. Contento. "The Locus Index to Science Fiction (1984-1998)". Archived from the original on January 21, 2008.
