= The Parrot Who Met Papa =

1991 collection of two short stories

- First edition
- Author: Ray Bradbury and David Aronovitz
- Language: English
- Publisher: Pretentious Press
- Publication date: 1991
- Publication place: United States
- Media type: Print (paperback)
- Pages: 20

The Parrot Who Met Papa is a 1991 collection of two short stories bound dos-à-dos. The first story is "The Parrot Who Met Papa" by Ray Bradbury. The other, "The Parrot Who Met Papa (concluded)" is by David Aronovitz, who also published the book. The Bradbury story first appeared in the magazine Playboy in 1972.

== Contents ==
- "The Parrot Who Met Papa", by Ray Bradbury
- "The Parrot Who Met Papa (concluded)", by David Aronovitz
