= Zen in the Art of Writing =

1990 book by Ray Bradbury

- Author: Ray Bradbury
- Publication date: 1990
- ISBN: 9781877741029

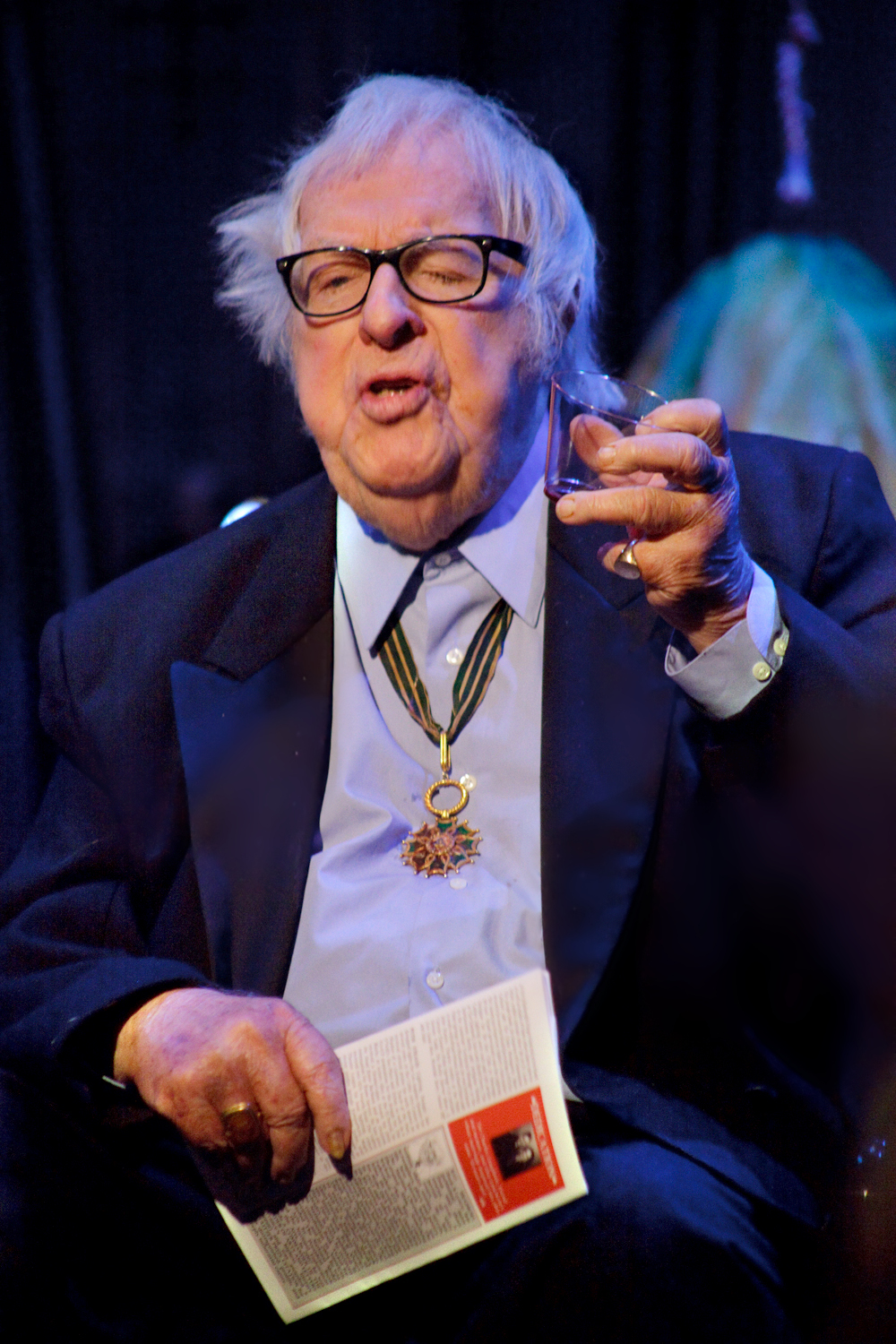
Ray Bradbury, pictured in 2009, writer of Zen in the Art of Writing

Zen in the Art of Writing: Essays on Creativity is a collection of essays by Ray Bradbury and published in 1990. The unifying theme is Bradbury's love for writing.

Essays included are:

- The Joy of Writing (1973)
- Run Fast, Stand Still, Or, The Thing At the Top of the Stairs, Or, New Ghosts From Old Minds (1986)
- How To Keep and Feed a Muse (1961)
- Drunk, and in Charge of a Bicycle (1980)
- Investing Dimes: Fahrenheit 451 (1982)
- Just This Side of Byzantium: Dandelion Wine (1974)
- The Long Road to Mars (1990)
- On The Shoulders of Giants (1980)
- The Secret Mind (1965)
- Shooting Haiku in a Barrell (1982)
- Zen in the Art of Writing (1973)
- ...On Creativity (No Date Given)

This book attempts to give creative ideas and inspiration to writers.

== See also ==
- Ray Bradbury bibliography
