= The Lake (short story) =

1944 short story by Ray Bradbury

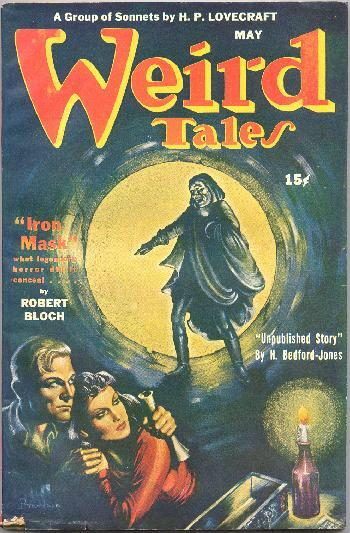
"The Lake" was originally published in the May 1944 issue of Weird Tales.

"The Lake" is a short story by American author Ray Bradbury. It was first published in the May 1944 edition of Weird Tales, and later collected in Bradbury's collections Dark Carnival, The October Country, and The Stories of Ray Bradbury. In an article written by Bradbury called "Run Fast, Stand Still" which was later collected in his book Zen in the Art of Writing, "The Lake" was written in two hours and led to him believing it was the finest story he'd ever written at that point in time.

== Plot ==
The story focuses on a young man named Harold and his recollection of a traumatic experience from his childhood where a close friend of his named Tally drowns in the lake where they often played together. Her body was never found. Visiting the lake once more as an adult alongside his newlywed wife, he finds that a lifeguard has recovered the wet corpse of a child who is soon revealed to be that of his beloved Tally.
