= The Last Circus and the Electrocution =

1980 short story collection by Ray Bradbury

The Last Circus & the Electrocution
- dust-jacket from the first edition
- Author: Ray Bradbury
- Illustrator: Joe Mugnaini
- Language: English
- Genre: short stories
- Publisher: Lord John Press
- Publication date: 1980
- Publication place: United States
- Media type: Print (hardback)
- Pages: xx, 29 pp
- ISBN: 0-935716-03-3
- OCLC: 6923758
- Dewey Decimal: 813/.54 19
- LC Class: PS3503.R167 L3 1980

The Last Circus & the Electrocution is a 1980 collection of two short stories by Ray Bradbury. "The Last Circus" is original to this collection. "The Electrocution" first appeared in The Californian in 1946 under the pseudonym William Elliot.

== Contents ==
- introduction by William F. Nolan
- "The Last Circus"
- "The Electrocution"
- "Under the Mushroom Tent" (essay)
