= The Small Assassin (book) =

1962 short story collection by Ray Bradbury

- Cover of the first edition.
- Author: Ray Bradbury
- Language: English
- Genre: fantasy, horror
- Publisher: Ace Books (UK)
- Publication date: 1962
- Publication place: United Kingdom
- Media type: Print (Paperback)
- Pages: 144

The Small Assassin (1962) is a short story collection by American writer Ray Bradbury. The stories originally appeared in the magazines Dime Mystery Magazine, Weird Tales, Harper's, Mademoiselle, and in Bradbury's first book, Dark Carnival.

The title story was made into a feature film in 2010.

== Contents ==
- "The Small Assassin"
- "The Next in Line"
- "The Lake"
- "The Crowd"
- "Jack-in-the-Box"
- "The Man Upstairs"
- "The Cistern"
- "The Tombstone"
- "The Smiling People"
- "The Handler"
- "Let’s Play 'Poison'"
- "The Night"
- "The Dead Man"
