= A Medicine for Melancholy =

Book of short stories

- Dust-jacket illustration from the first edition
- Author: Ray Bradbury
- Language: English
- Genre: Soft science fiction
- Publisher: Doubleday & Company
- Publication date: 1959
- Publication place: United States
- Media type: Print (hardback & paperback)
- Pages: 240
- ISBN: 0-380-73086-3 (paperback reprint)
- OCLC: 38229379

A Medicine for Melancholy (1959) is a collection of short stories by American writer Ray Bradbury. It was first published in the UK by Hart-Davis in 1959 as The Day It Rained Forever with a slightly different list of stories. All of the included stories were previously published.

== Contents ==
The British and American editions each had a different selection of stories, as well as ordering.

Story	US Edition	UK Edition
"In a Season of Calm Weather" (filmed as The Picasso Summer, 1969)	1	4
"The Dragon"	2	9
"A Medicine for Melancholy"	3	
"The End of the Beginning"	4	18
"The Wonderful Ice Cream Suit"	5	15
"Fever Dream"	6	2
"The Marriage Mender"	7	12
"The Town Where No One Got Off"	8	7
"A Scent of Sarsaparilla"	9	5
"Icarus Montgolfier Wright"	10	3
"The Headpiece"	11	13
"Dark They Were, and Golden-Eyed"	12	17
"The Smile"	13	11
"The First Night of Lent"	14	
"The Time of Going Away"	15	14
"All Summer in a Day"	16	
"The Gift"	17	10
"The Great Collision of Monday Last"	18	
"The Little Mice"	19	16
"The Shore Line at Sunset", vt "The Sunset Harp" (UK ed.)	20	22
"The Strawberry Window"	21	6
"The Day It Rained Forever"	22	1
"Referent"		21
"Almost the End of the World"		20
"Here There Be Tygers"		8
"Perchance to Dream"		23
"And the Rock Cried Out"		19

== Reception ==
Floyd C. Gale rated the collection four stars out of five, writing that "Bradbury's touch breathes fantasy into his most prosaic items ... all have an intense emotional impact".

== See also ==
- Ray Bradbury bibliography
- Ray Bradbury short fiction bibliography
