= Is That You, Herb? =

2003 short story by Ray Bradbury

- First edition
- Author: Ray Bradbury
- Illustrator: Bill Walker
- Language: English
- Genre: Short story
- Publisher: Gauntlet Press
- Publication date: 2003
- Publication place: United States
- Media type: Print (Paperback)
- Pages: 7 pp

"Is That You, Herb?" is a short story by author Ray Bradbury. A chapbook edition of it was published by Gauntlet Press in 2003.

== Sources ==
- "The Advanced Book Exchange".
