= The Aqueduct =

1979 short story by Ray Bradbury

- Short story by Ray Bradbury
- Country: United States
- Language: English
- Genre: Science fiction

Publication
- Publication type: Chapbook
- Publisher: Roy A. Squires
- Media type: Print (Paperback)
- Publication date: 1979

"The Aqueduct (A Martian Chronicle)" is a short story by American writer Ray Bradbury. Originally released as a limited edition chapbook, the story was subsequently collected in The Stories of Ray Bradbury in 1980.

Since its release the short story has been used in educational institutions.

== Summary ==
The story focuses on two lands, one in the North and one in the South. As the Southern lands lack ways to gain water, an aqueduct is built to ferry water from the North. When the construct is finally finished a year later, the Southerners are horrified when the promised water does not immediately arrive. They also learn that a war has broken out in the North that has resulted in a horrific slaughter, however the Southerners soon receive a message that the water was finally coming.

When the "water" arrives it is thick and red, however the Southerners rejoice and use it to bathe, irrigate their fields, and consume. A child points out the liquid was not water, however their mother urges the child not to ask questions. Rather than acknowledge that the water is actually blood, the Southerners instead request that their government exacerbate the war.

== Release ==
"The Aqueduct" was initially published in 1979 by Roy A. Squires in a limited edition chapbook that was limited to 230 numbered, signed copies. The following year the story was published in The Stories of Ray Bradbury and its subsequent editions.

"The Aqueduct" was translated into Romanian and published in the magazine Antarg SF in 1994.
