= Bradbury 13 =

- Running time: 30 minutes
- Home station: KBYU-FM Provo Utah
- Announcer: Ray Bradbury
- Created by: Michael McDonough
- Directed by: Michael McDonough
- Produced by: Michael McDonough
- Executive producer: Dean Van Uitert
- Edited by: Michael McDonough
- Narrated by: Paul Frees
- Recording studio: Brigham Young University
- Original release: 1983 – 1984
- No. of episodes: 13
- Sponsored by: National Public Radio

Bradbury 13 is a series of radio adaptations of Ray Bradbury stories. The series was created by Michael McDonough, who also adapted the stories, directed and produced the programs in 1983 and '84. Bradbury 13 aired nationally on NPR Playhouse on over 250 radio stations. Ray Bradbury introduced each episode, and Paul Frees acted as the announcer of each of the thirteen stories. Original music was composed by Roger Hoffman and Greg Hansen. The episodes were originally recorded and broadcast in high-quality stereophonic sound.

Bradbury 13 has achieved a cult status with many fans over the years, especially with those who enjoy radio drama.

The series won a Peabody Award and two Gold Cindy awards.

== Episodes ==
- The Ravine
- Night Call, Collect
- The Veldt
- There Was An Old Woman
- Kaleidoscope
- Dark They Were And Golden Eyed
- The Screaming Woman
- A Sound Of Thunder
- The Man
- The Wind
- The Fox and The Forest
- Here There Be Tygers
- The Happiness Machine
