= The October Country =

1955 collection of macabre short stories by writer Ray Bradbury

- Dust-jacket from the first edition
- Author: Ray Bradbury
- Illustrator: Joseph Mugnaini
- Language: English
- Genre: Horror, fantasy
- Publisher: Ballantine Books
- Publication date: November 16, 1955
- Publication place: United States
- Media type: Print (hardback)
- Pages: 306
- ISBN: 0-345-40785-7 (paperback reprint)
- OCLC: 35839803
- Dewey Decimal: 813/.54 21
- LC Class: PS3503.R167 O28 1996

The October Country is a 1955 collection of nineteen macabre short stories by American writer Ray Bradbury. It reprints fifteen of the twenty-seven stories of his 1947 collection Dark Carnival, and adds four more of his stories previously published elsewhere.

The collection was published in numerous editions by Ballantine Books. The 1955 hardcover and 1956 and 1962 softcover versions featured artwork by Joseph Mugnaini that was replaced in 1971 by an entirely different Bob Pepper illustration. It was again published in 1996, by Del Rey Books, a branch of Ballantine Books; the illustrations within were drawn by Mugnaini. This edition included a foreword by Bradbury, titled "May I Die Before My Voices", in Los Angeles, California, on April 24, 1996.

The October Country was published in the United Kingdom by Rupert Hart-Davis Ltd. in 1956, and reissued in 1976 by Grafton, an imprint of HarperCollins Publishers. The 1976 UK paperback edition includes "The Traveler", originally from the aforementioned Dark Carnival, and omits "The Next In Line", "The Lake", "The Small Assassin", "The Crowd", "Jack-In-The-Box", "The Man Upstairs" and "The Cistern".

In 1999, The October Country was published by Avon with a new cover illustration by Joseph Mugnaini, and a new introduction by Bradbury called "Homesteading the October Country".

== Contents ==
"The Dwarf"
The proprietor of a Mirror Maze and the proprietor of a hoop circus at the same carnival observe a dwarf who uses one of the mirrors to make himself appear taller.

"The Next in Line"
A couple staying in a small Mexican town comes across a cemetery which holds a shocking policy regarding the interred whose families cannot pay.

"The Watchful Poker Chip of H. Matisse"
A thoroughly dull man becomes the new avant garde craze precisely because he is boring.

"Skeleton"
A man becomes convinced his skeleton is out to ruin him, and consults an unorthodox specialist.

"The Jar"
A poor farmer buys a jar with something floating in it for twelve dollars and it soon becomes the conversation piece of the town. His wife begins to realize that she cannot stand the jar or him.

"The Lake"
A man revisits his childhood home and recalls a friend who drowned in a lake during childhood.

"The Emissary"
A sick boy who cannot go outside has only two connections to the world, his dog and a woman who lives in the neighborhood, but the neighbor dies and the dog inexplicably runs off.

"Touched With Fire"
Two old men make it their mission to push fulfillment on unhappy people. They unsuccessfully try to do so with a woman whose story ends bloodily. It was first published under the title "Shopping for Death".

"The Small Assassin"
A woman becomes convinced her newborn baby is out to kill her.

"The Crowd"
A man discovers something odd about the crowds that form around accidents.

"Jack-in-the-Box"
A boy lives with his mother in a vast secluded mansion. She raises him to be God after telling him his father, the original God, was killed by beasts outside.

"The Scythe"
A man comes into possession of a powerful scythe and a wheat field. He discovers that the task of reaping is more than meets the eye.

"Uncle Einar"
One of two stories in this collection to feature members of the Elliott family, a collection of movie monsters and immortal beings. This story focuses on a character named Uncle Einar, who tries to find a way into the skies after damaging his biological radar.

"The Wind"
A former travel writer becomes mortally afraid that the winds he has defied around the world are gathering to kill him.

"The Man Upstairs"
A young boy suspects the man renting the upper room of his house to be more than a man.

"There Was an Old Woman"
There was an old woman who defied death for years. Death tricked her one-day and stole her body but she was not going to let that stop her.

"The Cistern"
A woman describes to her sister how magical the land beneath the sewer must be, where lovers are reunited in death, torture and anguish.

"Homecoming"
The main story concerning the supernatural Elliott family. It chronicles their return to the ancestral home in Illinois for a gathering, and is seen through the eyes of Timothy, a mortal child left on their doorstep and who longs to be like them. Einar from "Uncle Einar" figures prominently. The story later formed the basis for the 2001 novel From the Dust Returned, which also incorporated the "Uncle Einar" story in its narrative.

"The Wonderful Death of Dudley Stone"
Fans track down a writer who chose to withdraw into seclusion and cease writing, and get his story from him.

== See also ==
- Bibliography of Halloween

== General and cited sources ==
- Tuck, Donald H. (1974). The Encyclopedia of Science Fiction and Fantasy. Chicago: Advent. p. 63. ISBN 0-911682-20-1.
- Bradbury, Ray. (1999). The October Country. New York: Avon. ISBN 0-380-97387-1.
