= The Fruit at the Bottom of the Bowl =

1948 short story by Ray Bradbury

- Short story by Ray Bradbury
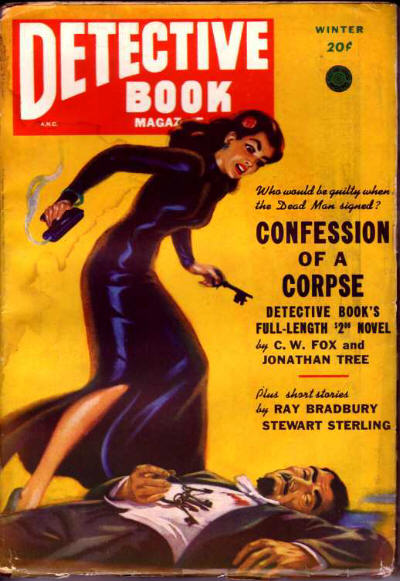
- Country: United States
- Language: English
- Genres: Crime, short story

Publication
- Published in: Detective Book Magazine
- Publication type: Magazine
- Media type: Print
- Publication date: November 1948

"The Fruit at the Bottom of the Bowl" is a short story by Ray Bradbury. It was first published in Detective Book Magazine in November 1948 (cover date: Winter) as "Touch and Go". The story was re-titled and published as "The Fruit at the Bottom of the Bowl" in EQMM in January 1953.

== Plot summary ==
Mr. Acton begins the story standing over the body of Mr. Huxley, whom he has just killed. While attempting to cover up his tracks, he has flashbacks of his encounters with Mr. Huxley, with whom he is having an altercation over a woman. These flashbacks reveal to the murderer that there are more and more of his fingerprints all over the man's house, because he realizes that he's touched so many different objects. His frenzy to remove all of the evidence distracts him from his actual objective, to get away with the crime. He is eventually caught, after polishing the entire house, while polishing and re-polishing the glass fruit at the bottom of a bowl. He is discovered by the police while dusting the attic. He leaves the room polishing the door handle and slamming it in victory.

== Publication history ==
The story was included in several of Bradbury's short story collections:

- The Golden Apples of the Sun, 1953
- The Vintage Bradbury, 1965
- Twice 22, 1966
- A Song Of Thunder and Other Stories, 2005

== Adaptations in other media ==
This story was adapted to the EC comic book Crime SuspenStories #17 (April–May 1953) as "Touch and Go" by Johnny Craig. ("comics.org".) It was adapted as an episode of the television series The Ray Bradbury Theater (January 23, 1988) as "The Fruit at the Bottom of the Bowl" with Michael Ironside and Robert Vaughn.
