= I See You Never =

1947 short story by Ray Bradbury

"I See You Never" is a short story by author Ray Bradbury. The story was originally published on November 8, 1947, in The New Yorker. As opposed to most of Bradbury's work, the story is not science fiction or fantasy but rather a vignette about a Mexican immigrant named Mr. Ramirez who is forced to leave the United States after he overstays his visa. Escorted by two police officers, he arrives at his landlady's door to say goodbye. Bradbury describes the pleasures Ramirez had taken in his life in Los Angeles and his sorrows of having to leave. It is included in the collection The Golden Apples of the Sun (1953).
