= The Small Assassin (short story) =

1946 short story by Ray Bradbury

- Short story by Ray Bradbury
- "The Small Assassin" was the cover story in the November 1946 issue of Dime Mystery.

Publication
- Published in: Dime Mystery
- Publication date: November, 1946

"The Small Assassin" is a short story by American author Ray Bradbury. It was first published in the November, 1946 issue of Dime Mystery. It was collected in Bradbury's anthology Dark Carnival and later collected in the anthologies The October Country, The Autumn People, The Small Assassin, The Stories of Ray Bradbury, and The Vintage Bradbury.

== Plot ==
David and Alice Leiber are a happily married couple living in Los Angeles, but when Alice gives birth to a healthy baby boy, she fears the baby is somehow abnormal and will kill her. She expresses her fears to her husband, who dismisses them and tries to comfort her. Their family doctor, Dr. Jeffers, explains that it is not unusual for some women to experience such feelings after the birth of a child—especially in Alice's case, as she almost died of complications of a Caesarean section during delivery.

David leaves for a business trip in Chicago and is gone for a few days. On his sixth day away he receives an emergency phone call from Dr. Jeffers, telling him Alice is seriously ill with pneumonia; David rushes home, and a frightened Alice tells him, "It was the baby again". She claims she got pneumonia because the baby cried all night to keep her from sleeping; she believes he is deliberately trying to weaken and kill her.

One night David hears the baby crying and gets up to fetch milk from the kitchen. At the top of the stairs he slips on a soft object, but he manages to catch the railing and does not fall downstairs. He finds a large patchwork doll at the top of the stairs, an object he had bought for the baby as a joke. Neither he nor Alice had placed it there. He begins to wonder whether Alice is right about their child.

When David comes home from work the next day he finds Alice dead, sprawled and broken at the bottom of the stairs. The patchwork doll lies beside her. Horrified, David tells Dr. Jeffers about his suspicions, believing that the child was born with the awareness and intelligence of an adult but with the inherent selfishness of a baby; the child hates the mother for removing him from the womb (where all his needs were attended to) and hates his father as a co-conspirator. However, the doctor does not believe him; instead, Dr. Jeffers prescribes sleeping pills for David, thinking a good 24-hour rest will curb the man's grief-fueled hysteria.

Early the next morning Dr. Jeffers drives up to the Leiber house. Knocking and getting no response, he goes inside. Immediately he smells the odor of gas in the house of Leiber. He rushes to David's room only to find David dead on the bed, and gas leaking from an open jet at the bottom of the wall near the door.

The doctor considers whether David might have turned on the gas himself, but then reasons that he couldn't have done so; he would have been knocked out by the sleeping pills. It couldn't have been suicide. He goes to the nursery only to find the door closed and the crib empty. Somehow, he reasons, the child must have crawled out of his crib and opened the gas jet, but then the door closed, trapping him outside the nursery. For this reason, Dr. Jeffers realizes David's suspicions were correct - the baby, named Lucifer by David, truly is a murderer.

Dr. Jeffers decides that since he was responsible for bringing the child into the world, it must be his responsibility to take the child out of it. Moving carefully through the house, he draws an item from his medical supplies and calls out to the baby, offering to show him "something shiny". The item is revealed to be a scalpel.

== Adaptations in other media ==
"The Small Assassin" was adapted to the EC comic book Shock SuspenStories #7 (February/March 1953) by Al Feldstein and George Evans. It was also adapted as an episode of the television series The Ray Bradbury Theater (April 9, 1988) featuring Susan Wooldridge, Leigh Lawson and Cyril Cusack. Another film adaptation was released in 2007.
