= Hollerbochen's Dilemma =

Science fiction short story

"Hollerbochen's Dilemma" is a science fiction short story by Ray Bradbury. Bradbury's first published work, it appeared in Forrest Ackerman's fanzine Imagination! in January 1938.

== Synopsis ==
Hollerbochen is precognitive, and has the ability to stop time to get out of danger, but when he is faced with too many threats at once, he explodes.

== Reception ==
"Hollerbochen's Dilemma" was poorly received, with Bradbury subsequently writing "no one enjoyed my story" and "I think it was terrible myself". Bradbury later wrote a sequel, "Hollerbochen Comes Back", in which a resurrected Hollerbochen rescues an imprisoned Bradbury and takes him to wreak wordplay-based vengeance on those who criticized the first story. Bradbury biographer Jonathan Eller has suggested that, together, the two Hollerbochen stories provide a "first glimpse of Bradbury's lifelong defense mechanism against developing an overweening ego."

In 2014, it was nominated for the 1939 Retro-Hugo Award for Best Short Story.
