= The Scythe (short story) =

1943 short story by Ray Bradbury

- Short story by Ray Bradbury
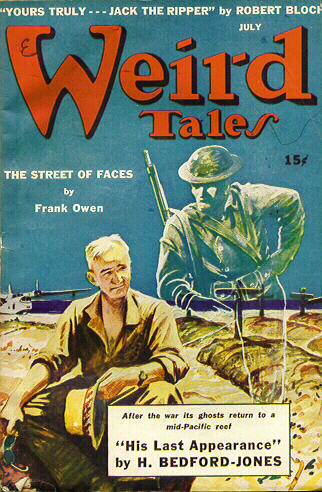
- Cover of July 1943 Weird Tales issue.
- Country: United States
- Language: English
- Genre: Fantasy

Publication
- Published in: Weird Tales
- Publication type: Magazine
- Publisher: Weird Tales
- Media type: Print (magazine)
- Publication date: July 1943'

"The Scythe" is a short story by American author Ray Bradbury. It was originally published in the July 1943 issue of Weird Tales. It was first collected in Bradbury's anthology Dark Carnival and later collected, in revised form, in The October Country and The Stories of Ray Bradbury.

== Plot summary ==
Through an odd stroke of luck, a poor family inherits a house, the wheat field surrounding it, and a strange scythe with the inscription "Who wields me--wields the world!" Every day the man of the family goes out to use the scythe in the field, but he notices strange things about the wheat and the way it grows. Over time, he comes to realize that every blade of wheat represents a human life, and that by accepting the house, the field and the scythe, he has unwittingly accepted the job of Grim Reaper.
