= The Flying Machine (short story) =

1953 short story by Ray Bradbury

- Short story by Ray Bradbury
- Country: United States
- Language: English
- Genre: Speculative fiction

Publication
- Published in: 1953

"The Flying Machine" is a short story written by Ray Bradbury in 1953. Bradbury also adapted the tale into a short play that same year.

== Plot ==
China, 400 AD. The Emperor Yuan notices a man who has created a contraption for flying. Emperor Yuan is not at all happy when he asks the inventor his purpose in creating such a device and the inventor replies that his motivation was merely the desire for innovation. Thus Yuan orders that the inventor shall be executed because, while his flying machine may be a beautiful creation, the emperor sees the devastating potential for those who "have an evil face and an evil heart" and will seek to use it for purposes other than the enjoyment of flight, namely flying over the Great Wall of China and destroying it. For this reason, the inventor is executed, the flying machine is burned, and all who saw it are silenced. But in the last line the Emperor mourns the loss of the machine, the marvel of which he appreciates but the danger of which is too great to allow its survival.
