= Dark Carnival (short story collection) =

1947 short story collection by Ray Bradbury

- First edition cover
- Author: Ray Bradbury
- Cover artist: George Burrows (photo montage)
- Language: English
- Genre: Science fiction, fantasy, horror
- Publisher: Arkham House
- Publication date: 1947
- Publication place: United States
- Media type: Print (hardback)
- Pages: 313

Dark Carnival is a short story collection by American writer Ray Bradbury, first published October 1947 by Arkham House. It was his debut book, and many of the stories were reprinted elsewhere.

== Contents ==
1. "The Homecoming"
2. "Skeleton"
3. "The Jar"
4. "The Lake"
5. "The Maiden"
6. "The Tombstone"
7. "The Smiling People"
8. "The Emissary"
9. "The Traveler"
10. "The Small Assassin"
11. "The Crowd"
12. "Reunion"
13. "The Handler"
14. "The Coffin"
15. "Interim"
16. "Jack-in-the-Box"
17. "The Scythe"
18. "Let's Play 'Poison'"
19. "Uncle Einar"
20. "The Wind"
21. "The Night"
22. "There Was An Old Woman"
23. "The Dead Man"
24. "The Man Upstairs"
25. "The Night Sets"
26. "Cistern"
27. "The Next In Line"

== About the stories ==
Dark Carnival was Bradbury's first published book. 3,112 copies were printed by Arkham House, under the editorial direction of August Derleth. All but six of the stories had been first published elsewhere, although Bradbury revised some of the texts.

Fifteen of the 27 stories were reprinted in The October Country in 1955, some in revised form. Those stories are "The Next in Line", "Skeleton", "The Jar", "The Lake", "The Emissary", "The Small Assassin", "The Crowd", "Jack-in-the-Box", "The Scythe", "Uncle Einar", "The Wind", "The Man Upstairs", "There Was an Old Woman", "The Cistern" and "The Homecoming".

Of the remainder, eight have been reprinted in one or more collections.

- "The Traveler" and "The Coffin" are in The Stories of Ray Bradbury
- "The Night" is in The Stories of Ray Bradbury and The Small Assassin, a British-only collection
- "Let's Play 'Poison'" is in Bradbury Stories: 100 of His Most Celebrated Tales and The Small Assassin
- "The Tombstone" is in The Toynbee Convector and The Small Assassin
- "The Smiling People", "The Dead Man" and "The Handler" are in Bradbury Stories and The Small Assassin.

"The Night Sets", "The Maiden", "Reunion" and "Interim" have not been anthologized as of 2010.

For many years, Bradbury did not permit Dark Carnival to be reprinted, since updated versions of many of the stories were collected as The October Country. However, a limited edition of Dark Carnival, with five extra stories and a new introduction by Bradbury, was printed by Gauntlet Press in 2001.

== See also ==
- Ray Bradbury short fiction bibliography

== Sources ==
- Jaffery, Sheldon (1989). The Arkham House Companion. Mercer Island, WA: Starmont House, Inc. pp. 25–26. ISBN 1-55742-005-X.
- Chalker, Jack L.; Mark Owings (1998). The Science-Fantasy Publishers: A Bibliographic History, 1923-1998. Westminster, MD and Baltimore: Mirage Press, Ltd. p. 31.
- Joshi, S.T. (1999). Sixty Years of Arkham House: A History and Bibliography. Sauk City, WI: Arkham House. pp. 42–43. ISBN 0-87054-176-5.
- Nielsen, Leon (2004). Arkham House Books: A Collector's Guide. Jefferson, NC and London: McFarland & Company, Inc. p. 63. ISBN 0-7864-1785-4.
