= The Illustrated Man =

1951 short story collection by Ray Bradbury

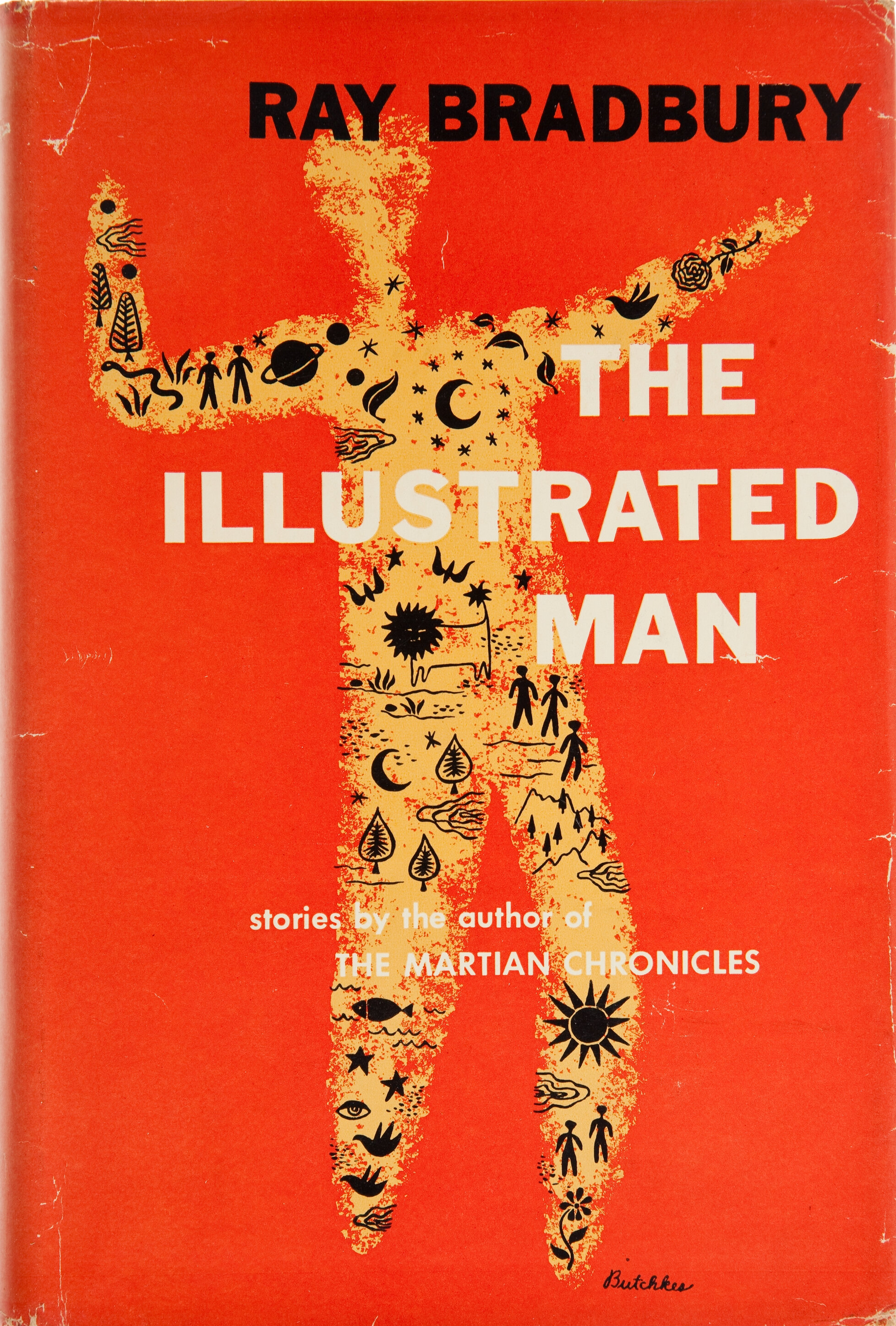
- Dust jacket from the first edition.
- Author: Ray Bradbury
- Cover artist: Sydney Butchkes
- Language: English
- Genre: Science fiction
- Publisher: Doubleday & Company
- Publication date: 1951
- Publication place: United States
- Media type: Print (hardback)
- Pages: 256
- ISBN: 0-553-23096-4

The Illustrated Man is a 1951 collection of 18 science fiction short stories by American writer Ray Bradbury. A recurring theme throughout the stories is the conflict of the cold mechanics of technology and the psychology of people. It was nominated for the International Fantasy Award in 1952.

The unrelated stories are tied together by the frame story of "The Illustrated Man", a vagrant former member of a carnival freak show with an extensively tattooed body whom the unnamed narrator meets. The man's tattoos, allegedly created by a time-traveling woman, are individually animated, and each tells a different tale.

The novel is a fix-up: all but one of the stories had been published previously elsewhere, although Bradbury revised some of the texts for the book's publication.

The book was made into the 1969 film, The Illustrated Man, starring Rod Steiger and Claire Bloom. It presents adaptations of the stories "The Veldt", "The Long Rain" and "The Last Night of the World".

Some of the stories, including "The Veldt", "The Fox and the Forest" (as "To the Future"), "Marionettes, Inc.", and "Zero Hour" were also dramatized for the 1955–1957 radio series X Minus One. "The Veldt", "The Concrete Mixer", "The Long Rain", "Zero Hour", and "Marionettes Inc." were adapted for The Ray Bradbury Theater television series. "The Fox and the Forest" was adapted by Terry Nation for the 1965 BBC television series Out of the Unknown.

== Story summaries ==
=== The Veldt ===
Parents in a futuristic society George and Lydia Hadley worry about their children Wendy and Peter Hadley's mental health when their new virtual reality nursery, which can produce any environment the children imagine, continually projects an African veldt, populated by lions feasting on carcasses. David McClean, a child psychologist, suggests that the automated house is not good for Wendy and Peter's development, nor George and Lydia's, and insists they disable the automation and take a vacation to become more self-sufficient.

Wendy and Peter are not pleased with this decision but later coolly agree to it. Wendy and Peter trap George and Lydia in the nursery, where they become prey to the lions. They later have lunch on the veldt with McClean. He then see the lions feasting but does not recognize what has happened.

=== Kaleidoscope ===
The crew of a spaceship drift helplessly through space after their craft malfunctions. The story describes the final thoughts and conversations of the crew members as they face their death. The narrator Hollis bitterly reflects on his life and feels he has accomplished nothing worthwhile. His final thought is a wish that his life would at least be worth something to someone else. As he falls through Earth's atmosphere and is incinerated, he appears as a shooting star to a child in Illinois.

=== The Other Foot ===
Mars has been colonized solely by Black people. When they learn that a rocket is coming from Earth with White travelers, they institute a Jim Crow system of racial segregation in retaliation for how the White people once treated them. When the rocket lands, the travelers tell them that the entire Earth has been destroyed by war, including all of the horrific mementos of racism (such as trees used for lynching Black people), leaving few survivors. The Black people take pity on the White travelers and accept them into their new society.

=== The Highway ===
Hernando and his wife living by a highway in rural Mexico live their simple, regimented lives while the highway fills with refugees of a nuclear war. They give assistance to some young travelers, who tell them that the nuclear war means the end of the world. After the travelers leave, Hernando wonders what they meant by "the world," before returning to his work as normal.

Written in the early nuclear age, the story contrasts the panic of the technologically advanced Americans with the quiet resilience of Hernando, whose "world" is his immediate, rural environment.

=== The Man ===
Space explorers find a planet where the population is in a state of bliss. Upon investigation, they discover that an enigmatic visitor came to them, whom the spacemen come to believe is Jesus. One explorer, Martin, decides to spend his life rejoicing in the man's glory. Another, Captain Hart, uses the spaceship to try to catch up to the mysterious traveller, but at each planet he finds that "He" has just left after spreading his message. Other members of the crew remain on the planet to learn from the contented citizens, and are rewarded by the discovery that "He" is still on the planet.

=== The Long Rain ===
A group of astronauts is stranded on Venus, where it rains continually and heavily. The travelers make their way across the Venusian landscape to find a "sun dome", a shelter with a large artificial light source. The first sun dome they find has been destroyed by the native Venusians. Searching for another sun dome, the characters, one by one, are driven to madness and suicide by the unrelenting rhythm of the rain. At the end of the story, only one astronaut, the Lieutenant remains. His sanity in question, he finds a functional sun dome.

=== The Rocket Man ===
Narrator Doug remembers his astronaut father coming home after a three-month space flight, one summer when Doug was 14. His father tried to interest himself in Earth life, but after a few days he felt the urge to return to space. He warned Doug not to become an astronaut, always torn between Earth and space and at risk of a million deaths. Doug's mother Lilly prepared a Thanksgiving dinner the night before his father's departure, even though she had long ago accepted that he would die in space and had detached herself emotionally. The next morning his father assured them that the mission would be his last. After word arrived that his father's rocket had fallen into the sun, Doug and Lilly shunned the daylight.

=== The Fire Balloons ===
A group of priests travels to Mars to act as missionaries to the Martians. They discover that the natives are entities of pure energy. Since they lack corporeal form, they are unable to commit sin, and thus do not need redemption.

=== The Last Night of the World ===
A married couple awaken to the knowledge that the world is going to end that very evening. Nonetheless, they go through their normal routines, knowing and accepting the fact that there is no tomorrow.

=== The Exiles ===
Numerous works of literature are banned and burned on Earth. The deceased authors of these books live in a kind of afterlife on Mars. Though dead, they are still vulnerable in the sense that when all of an author's works are destroyed, the author vanishes permanently. The authors learn that people are coming from Earth, and they stage their retribution. Their efforts are foiled when the astronauts burn the last remaining books, annihilating the entire colony.

=== No Particular Night or Morning ===
Two friends in a spaceship, Clemens and Hitchcock, discuss the emptiness and cold of space. The slightly eccentric Hitchcock embraces solipsism, and repeatedly insists that nothing in space is real and there is no night or morning. He refuses to believe anything about reality without sufficient evidence and soon becomes skeptical of everything he cannot directly experience. He says that he does not believe in stars, because they are too far away. Clemens learns that Hitchcock has left the ship. Hitchcock continues to mumble to himself as he dies of exposure to the void of space.

=== The Fox and the Forest ===
William and Susan Travis, a couple living in a war-ravaged future society on the brink of collapse uses time travel to escape to 1938 Mexico. They and others before them have used the technology to enjoy life before chemical, nuclear, and biological warfare ruined everything. Unfortunately, the authorities have also traveled back in time to return the exiles to the future.

=== The Visitor ===
Mars is used as isolation for people with deadly illnesses. One day, the planet is visited by a young man named Leonard Mark of 18 who has telepathic abilities. The exiles, including a man named Saul Williams, on the planet are thrilled with his ability and a violent fight breaks out over who will get to spend the most time with their visitor and enjoy the illusionary paradises he can transmit. In the struggle, Mark is killed and the escape he provided is lost forever.

=== The Concrete Mixer ===
Ettil, a reluctant Martian man is forced to join the army as they prepare to invade Earth. When they arrive, they are welcomed by a world at peace, full of people who are curious rather than aggressive. Ettil meets Joe Melton, a movie director, and it becomes clear that the people of Earth have planned to exploit the Martians for financial gain. He tries to escape to Mars, but is run over by a car and killed.

=== Marionettes, Inc. ===
An unhappily married man, Braling, buys a realistic robot who looks exactly like him, Braling Two, from Marionettes, Inc. Braling Two acts as a surrogate so that Braling does not have to deal with his wife, who trapped him into marriage by getting pregnant and threatening to turn him in for rape if he leaves her. While Braling's friend Smith considers getting his own robot doppelgänger, he discovers that his wife Nettie already has replaced herself with one. Braling Two falls in love with Mrs. Braling. Arguing that he is better at providing for her than Braling, Braling Two locks the real man in the crate in which the robot was delivered.

=== The City ===
A rocket expedition from Earth lands on an uncharted planet and finds a seemingly empty city. As the humans begin to explore, they realize that the city is not as empty as it seems. The city was waiting for the arrival of humans, designed by a long dead civilization to take revenge upon humanity; the civilization was destroyed by human biological weapons before recorded history. Once the city captures and kills the human astronauts, the humans' corpses are used as automatons to take a final act of revenge — a biological attack on the Earth.

=== Zero Hour ===
In the near future, young children are persuaded to help a seemingly imaginary friend named Drill to play a game called Invasion. When one of the mothers Mary Morris realizes that children far away from her town play the exact same game, and her own daughter Mink says casually that the adults will have to die, she starts to worry. Eventually Drill turns out to be a real alien with many more coming after him, and they find the hiding parents Mary and her husband Henry Morris with the help of their own daughter Mink.

=== The Rocket ===
Fiorello Bodoni, a poor junkyard owner, has saved $3,000 to fulfill his dream to send one member of his family into outer space. The family cannot choose who will go, fearing those left behind will resent the one chosen. Bodoni instead uses the money to build a replica rocket containing a virtual reality theater that simulates a voyage through space.

== Other versions ==
The British edition, first published in 1952 by Hart-Davis omits "The Rocket Man", "The Fire Balloons", "The Exiles" and "The Concrete Mixer", and adds "Usher II" from The Martian Chronicles and "The Playground".

Editions published by Avon Books in 1997 and William Morrow in 2001 omit "The Fire Balloons" and add "The Illustrated Man" to the end of the book.

"Usher II"
Literary expert William Stendahl has retreated to Mars to escape the book-burning dictates of the Moral Climate Monitors. On Mars he has built his image of the perfect haunted mansion, replicating the building from Edgar Allan Poe's short story "The Fall of the House of Usher", complete with mechanical creatures, creepy soundtracks and the extermination of all life in the surrounding area. When the Moral Climate Monitors come to visit, each of them is killed in a manner reminiscent of a different Poe story, culminating in the immurement of the lead inspector. When all of Stendahl's persecutors are dead, the house sinks into the lake.

"The Playground"
When Charles Underhill was a boy, he was tormented by neighborhood bullies. When his son Jim Underhill begins playing in a local playground, Charles becomes deeply disturbed when he sees Tom Marshall, a bully from his youth.

"The Illustrated Man"
William Philippus Phelps, an overweight carnival worker is given a second chance as a Tattooed Man, and visits a strange woman who applies tattoos over his entire body. She covers two special areas, claiming they will show the future. The first is an illustration of the man strangling his wife Lisabeth Phelps. Shortly after this comes to pass, the carnival workers run William down, beat him, and look at the second area. It shows an illustration of the beating in which they are engaged.

== Reception ==
In The New York Times in February 1951, Villiers Gerson praised the book for its "three-dimensional people with whom it is easy to sympathize, to hate, and to admire".

In July 1951 Gerson praised The Illustrated Man in Astounding Science Fiction as "a book which demonstrates that its author is one of the most literate and spellbinding writers in science fiction today".

Contemporary reviewers Anthony Boucher and J. Francis McComas gave The Illustrated Man a mixed review in The Magazine of Fantasy & Science Fiction in August 1951, faulting the framing story as "markedly ineffective" and the story selection for being "less than wisely chosen". However, they found the better stories "provide a feast [from] the finest traditions in imaginative fiction" and, writing for the same magazine in April 1952, named it among 1951's top books.

== Adaptations to other media ==
=== 1969 film ===
A film adaptation of The Illustrated Man was released in 1969. It was directed by Jack Smight and starred Rod Steiger, Claire Bloom, and others, including Don Dubbins. The script was by producer Howard B. Kreitsek. The film contains adaptations of "The Veldt", "The Long Rain", and "The Last Night of the World" and expands the prologue and epilogue with intermittent scenes and flashbacks of how the illustrations came to be. A short documentary, Tattooed Steiger, details the process the filmmakers used to cover Steiger's body in mock tattoos and shows actors and filmmakers preparing for the movie.

=== Influence on To the Dark Side of the Moon, 2010 ===
A theater adaptation of "Kaleidoscope", with influence from music by Pink Floyd was used to produce To the Dark Side of the Moon, in reference to the Pink Floyd album by a very similar name. This adaptation was produced by Stern-Theater, a Swiss-based theater company. The script was written by Daniel Rohr and was first shown at the Theater Rigiblick in Zürich, Switzerland on February 6, 2010. The music includes creative use of a string quartet and a piano.

=== BBC Radio, 2014 ===
A radio adaptation was broadcast on BBC Radio 4 on 14 June 2014 as part of the Dangerous Visions series adapted by Brian Sibley, directed by Gemma Jenkins and starring Iain Glen as The Illustrated Man and Jamie Parker as The Youth. The stories adapted for this production were "Marionettes, Inc.", "Zero Hour" and "Kaleidoscope".

=== Film in development ===
Since 2009, director Zack Snyder has been attached to direct, at least in part, a film adaptation of three stories from The Illustrated Man: "The Illustrated Man", "Veldt", and "Concrete Mixer", with screenwriter Alex Tse writing the screenplay.

=== The Whispers television series ===
The Whispers is an American television series based on the short story "Zero Hour".

=== The Bradbury Tattoos (rock opera, 2018) ===
A new rock opera titled The Bradbury Tattoos was scheduled to premiere in Cincinnati, Ohio, on July 13 and July 22, 2018, in collaboration with concert:nova, a contemporary classical ensemble composed of musicians from the Cincinnati Symphony Orchestra. Written by composer Zac Greenberg and librettist Michael Burnham, the opera is adapted from four stories in The Illustrated Man -- "Kaleidoscope," "Zero Hour," "The Highway" and "The Last Night of the World." The production is funded by the National Endowment for the Arts.

=== The Ray Bradbury Chronicles (concept album, 2025) ===
The closing track of the instrumental concept album The Ray Bradbury Chronicles was inspired by the short story. The electronic composition conveys the plot's key moments via soundscapes that express the main protagonist's journey, with his descent to Earth (seen as a shooting star by a child) symbolized by a fading heartbeat and the appearance of a piano motif that is an Earthly counterpoint to the electronic textures heard until that point.

== References in popular culture ==
- The 1999 novel The Illustrated Mum by Jacqueline Wilson is a reference to The Illustrated Man by title.
- Elton John's hit song, "Rocket Man" from his 1972 album Honky Château was inspired by the Bradbury story.
- The band Pearls Before Swine released a song named after and inspired by "The Rocket Man" on their 1970 album The Use of Ashes.
- In the 2007 film Blades of Glory, Will Ferrell's character Chazz Michael Michaels claims to be referred to as "The Illustrated Man".
- Numerous references to The Illustrated Man are made throughout an episode of Criminal Minds (episode 20, season 5, entitled "...A Thousand Words") that deals with Robert Burke (John Thaddeus) a serial killer whose body is covered in tattoos.
- In 2012, shortly before author Ray Bradbury's death, Canadian musician Deadmau5 produced a song titled "The Veldt", including lyrics by Chris James based upon the short story on his album Album Title Goes Here. The music video, released after Bradbury's death, is dedicated to him.
- Post-rock band Deadhorse refer their 2010 album release We Can Create Our Own World to be directly influenced by the book.
- Noah Taylor's character Dick Roswell can be seen reading the book in Cameron Crowe's 2000 film Almost Famous while on a tour bus.
- The Illustrated Man himself appears in The Simpsons' 2013 "Treehouse of Horror XXIV" episode from the twenty-fifth season in the couch gag with his author, Ray Bradbury.
- In "House Arrest", a 2000 episode of The Sopranos (season 2, episode 11), Dick Barone (Joe Lisi) refers to a man covered in tattoos as "The Illustrated Man."
- "Kaleidoscope" seems to have inspired the ending of the 1974 film Dark Star with the ships crew drifting apart to their various fates including joining a meteor shower and hitting the planet they'd bombed.
- American melodic death metal band Light This City released two songs on their 2008 album Stormchaser inspired by Ray Bradbury stories. The song "Firehaven" was inspired by "The Long Rain" and the song "Wake Me at Sunset" was inspired by "The Rocket Man."
- The 2019 Quentin Tarantino movie Once Upon a Time in Hollywood includes a radio trailer for the film version of The Illustrated Man playing in the background.
- In the 2023 Black Mirror episode "Beyond the Sea", this book is seen near the computer of a spacecraft.
- In the 2019 Argentine film The Blonde One (Un Rubio) directed by Marco Berger, the character Gabriel (Gaston Re) reads The Illustrated Man while lying on his bed.
- In 2024's The Simpsons season 36 episode "Treehouse of Horror Presents: Simpsons Wicked This Way Comes", Lisa Simpson (voiced by Yeardley Smith) encounters The Illustrated Man (voiced by Andy Serkis) at the R. Bradbury Night Circus, who relates versions of "The Screaming Woman", "Marionettes, Inc.", and Fahrenheit 451.
- In the 2025 film Good Boy, Kathryn gives Tommy a copy of The Illustrated Man
