= A Sound of Thunder =

1952 science fiction short story by Ray Bradbury

- Short story by Ray Bradbury
- Country: United States
- Language: English
- Genre: Science fiction

Publication
- Published in: Collier's
- Publication date: June 28, 1952

"A Sound of Thunder" is a science fiction short story by American writer Ray Bradbury, first published in Collier's magazine on June 28, 1952, and later in Bradbury's 1953 collection The Golden Apples of the Sun.

== Plot ==
In the year 2055, time travel is a practical reality, and the company Time Safari Inc. offers wealthy adventurers the chance to travel back in time to hunt extinct animals such as dinosaurs. A hunter named Eckels pays the company to travel to the Mesozoic to hunt a Tyrannosaurus rex. He expresses relief that the candidate Keith won the presidential election the day before, noting that he might want to use a time machine to escape if the would-be dictator Deutscher had become President of the United States instead. [In reality, 2055 will not be a presidential election year, as it is not divisible by four.] The company emphasizes strict rules to avoid altering the future, such as staying on a levitating path and only shooting marked animals destined to die naturally. Eckels, joined by other hunters and guided by Travis and Lesperance, is warned about the catastrophic consequences of even minor disruptions to the past, such as killing even a single mouse, which could cascade through time and alter history.

During the hunt, Eckels panics upon seeing the massive Tyrannosaurus and returns to the time machine. The group kills the dinosaur, but Travis is enraged to discover that Eckels stepped off the path into the dirt. He orders Eckels to retrieve the bullets from the corpse to prevent further disruption, then threatens him as they return to 2055. Upon arrival subtle changes in the air, colors, and a sign's spelling indicate that the timeline has shifted. Eckels finds a dead butterfly on his boot and realizes that his misstep altered history. Most shockingly, he learns that the "iron man" dictator Deutscher has won the presidential election instead of Keith. As he pleads on his knees that there must be a solution, Travis raises his rifle and fires with "a sound of thunder."

== Adaptations ==
A comic-book version appeared in issue #25 of EC Comics's Weird Science-Fantasy (1954), adapted by Al Feldstein with art by Al Williamson and Angelo Torres.

The story was adapted for the first issue of Topps Comics's Ray Bradbury Comics (1993) with art by Richard Corben.

The story was adapted as an episode of the radio drama series Bradbury 13, which aired as thirty-minute episodes between 1983 and 1984 on NPR Playhouse.

The story was adapted for the fourth season episode six of The Ray Bradbury Theater on October 8, 1989, starring Kiel Martin.

A film adaptation of the same name starring Ben Kingsley, Edward Burns, and Catherine McCormack was released in 2005. Famed film critic Roger Ebert stated that while he "cannot endorse it, [he] can appreciate it" as a film that is bad because it "want[s] so much to be terrific that [it] explode[s] under the strain."

A Game Boy Advance video game based on the film was also released. It was finished in time for the film's planned 2003 release, delayed along with it, and ultimately released in February 2005. Planned console ports were canceled.

The story is parodied in the Time and Punishment section of The Simpsons episode "Treehouse of Horror V".

The story is referenced in a brief scene at the beginning of the Doctor Who episode "Space Babies".

== Influence ==
"A Sound of Thunder" is often credited as the origin of the term "butterfly effect", a concept of chaos theory in which the flapping of a butterfly's wings in one part of the world could create a hurricane on the opposite side of the globe. The term was actually introduced by meteorologist Edward Norton Lorenz in the 1960s. However, Bradbury's concept of how the death of a butterfly in the past could have drastic changes in the future is a representation of the butterfly effect and is used as an example of how to consider chaos theory and the physics of time travel.

== See also ==
- "A Gun for Dinosaur" – Short story by L. Sprague de Camp
