= The Veldt (short story) =

1950 short story by Ray Bradbury

- Short story by Ray Bradbury
- Country: United States
- Language: English
- Genre: Science fiction

Publication
- Published in: The Saturday Evening Post
- Publication type: Periodical
- Media type: Print (magazine)
- Publication date: September 23, 1950

External audio
- "Sci-Fi Radio Drama" (performance of The Veldt), Distillations Podcast, Science History Institute

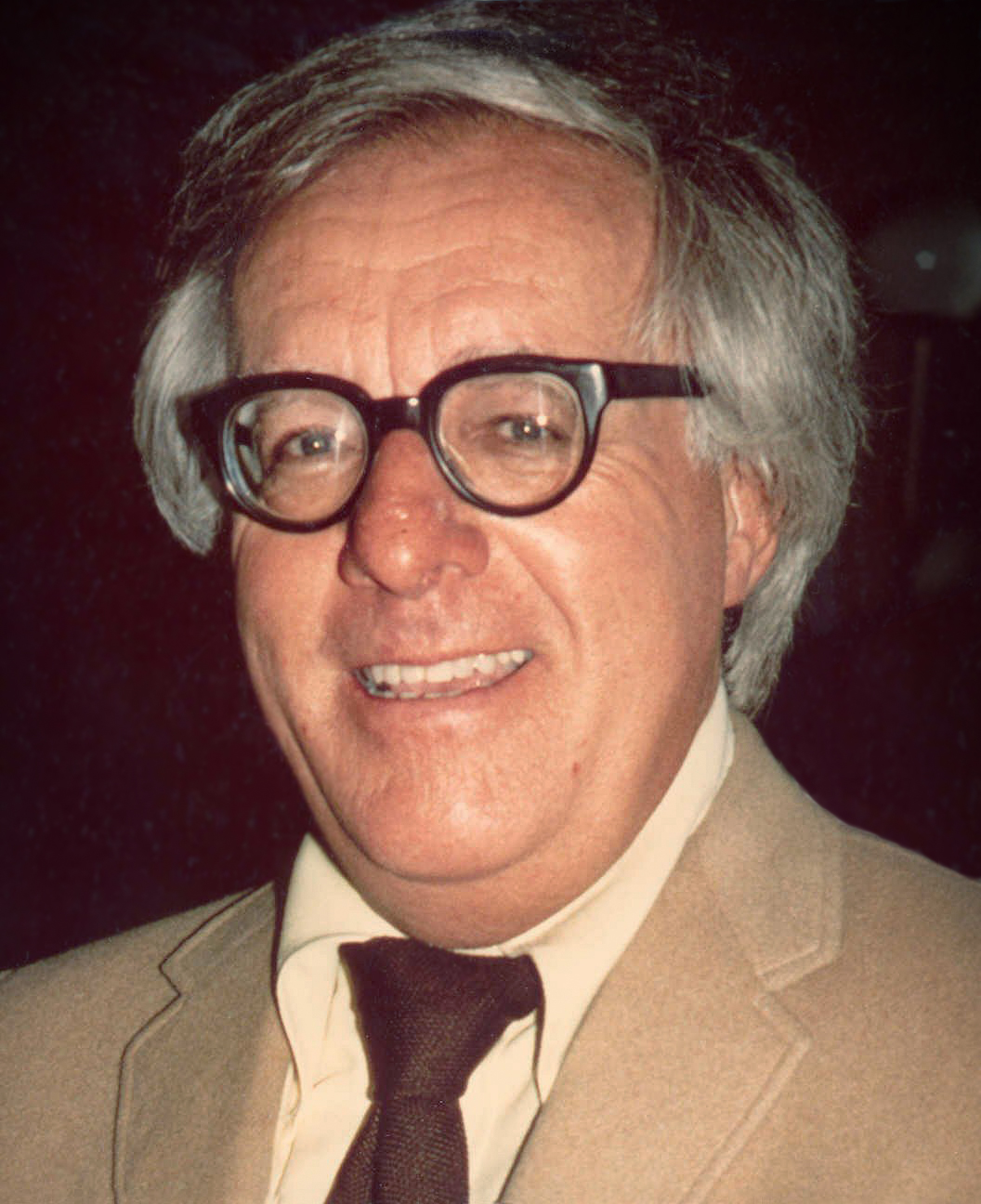
Ray Bradbury in 1975

"The Veldt" is a science fiction short story by American author Ray Bradbury. Originally appearing as "The World the Children Made" in the September 23, 1950, issue of The Saturday Evening Post, it was republished under its current name in the 1951 anthology The Illustrated Man.

In the story, a mother and father struggle with their technologically advanced home taking over their role as parents, and their children becoming uncooperative as a result of their lack of discipline.

== Plot ==
The Hadley family lives in an automated house called "the Happylife Home", filled with machines that aid them in completing everyday tasks, such as tying their shoes, bathing them, or cooking their food. The two children, Peter and Wendy, (Note: Their names pay homage to Peter Pan and Wendy Darling.) enjoy time in the "nursery", a virtual reality room able to realistically reproduce any place they imagine, and grow increasingly attached to it.

The parents, George and Lydia, wonder if the automated house's functions have rendered their roles as parents superfluous. They are also perplexed that the nursery seems stuck on a wild African veldt in which lions eat what they believe to be animals. There they also find recreations of their personal belongings and hear strangely familiar screams. Wondering why their children are so fascinated by this scene of death, they decide to consult psychiatrist David McClean, who suggests they leave the home, move to the country, and learn to be more self-sufficient.

Peter and Wendy strongly resist and convince their parents to let them have one last visit to the nursery. When George and Lydia come to fetch them, the children lock them in the nursery with the pride of lions; they realize that the screams belonged to simulated versions of themselves. Shortly after, David comes by to look for George and Lydia. He finds the children enjoying lunch in the nursery and sees the lions and vultures eating carcasses in the distance, which are implied to be the parents.

== See also ==
- Simulated reality
