= Dark They Were, and Golden-Eyed =

1949 short story by Ray Bradbury

- Short story by Ray Bradbury
- Original title: The Naming of Names
- Country: United States
- Language: English
- Genre: Science fiction short story

Publication
- Published in: Thrilling Wonder Stories
- Publication type: Periodical
- Media type: Print (magazine)
- Publication date: August 1949; 77 years ago

"Dark They Were, and Golden-Eyed" is a science fiction short story by American writer Ray Bradbury. It was originally published in the magazine Thrilling Wonder Stories in August 1949 under the title "The Naming of Names". It was subsequently included in the short-story collections A Medicine for Melancholy and S Is for Space.

Like many other stories by Ray Bradbury, this story takes place on Mars in the near future.

== Plot summary ==
At the beginning of a world-spanning war, a group of colonists are dispatched to the planet Mars from a spaceport in New York City. The Bittering family, composed of father Harry, mother Cora, and their children Dan (referred to as Tim in some versions), Laura, and David, arrives as part of the few colonists chosen for the first wave. Harry is initially disquieted by the Martian environment, but he takes comfort in the fact that the family can return to Earth when resupply ships arrive.

Strange events begin to affect the life brought as part of the settlement effort, including the seeded grass sprouting purple, the family cow growing a third horn in the middle of its head, and other anomalies with the vegetable garden. Harry's discomfort on Mars increases and the thought of returning to Earth on the next resupply mission soon becomes his only comfort, much to the concern of Cora. This solace is taken away as Bittering is informed that the war has led to an atomic bomb devastating New York City and destroying the only spaceport capable of supporting travel to Mars. Frantically, he begins work on building a rocket to return himself and his family to Earth. As he works on his rocket, the colonists themselves soon begin to manifest Martian traits. Harry staves this off by only eating food brought from Earth, but eventually runs out. With no choice but to consume Martian-grown food, he soon notices that his own eyes have started to turn gold, and the townsfolk's skin darkens into a shade of brown.

Cora convinces Harry that a family swim in one of the rivers of Mars would do him good to relax, and he hesitantly agrees. While there, their eldest son, Dan, requests to be referred to by the Martian name Linnl. Harry and Cora, now almost entirely Martian, agree easily, and the other two children quickly adopt Martian names as well. As they return to the town, the Bitterings discover that the colonists are retreating to the ancient Martian villas in the mountains, as the summer has made the valley stiflingly hot. Harry briefly expresses a wish to stay and work on his rocket but is easily persuaded to go with the rest of the colonists and come back when the weather is cooler.

Five years later, the United States, having won the war and rebuilt New York, sends a small military dispatch to recover the colonists sent to Mars, only to find their settlement abandoned. The soldiers instead encounter a large Martian settlement in the mountain villas, where the native Martians are pleasant and have a remarkable affinity for English. Blaming the original colony's disappearance on a plague instead of the local Martians, the group agrees to attempt a second, larger settlement using the town built by the first group.

== Analysis ==
Change is the main theme of "Dark They Were, and Golden-Eyed". The protagonist, Harry Bittering, is forced to deal with his rapidly changing family and surroundings. The river the family chooses to swim in symbolizes the change around the people as they live in their town. In this way, the Martian environment represents a new, unknown future awaiting the colonists. Harry's fear of the changes to himself and others stems from Martian influence over the settlement, and his attachment to the colony's past and origin (namely, Earth) is symbolized by the rocket he works on. The abandonment of the rocket then symbolizes letting go of the past and moving on.
