= The Pedestrian =

1951 short story by Ray Bradbury

- Short story by Ray Bradbury
- Translator: English
- Country: United States
- Language: English
- Genre: Science fiction

Publication
- Published in: The Reporter
- Publication type: Magazine
- Media type: Print
- Publication date: August 7, 1951

"The Pedestrian" is a science fiction short story by American writer Ray Bradbury. This story was originally published in the August 7, 1951 issue of The Reporter by The Fortnightly Publishing Company. It is included in the collection The Golden Apples of the Sun (1953), but was dropped from later editions of this collection (1990 and 1997).

== Summary ==
The story features Leonard Mead, a citizen of a television-centered world in November 2053. (Note: This is the year given in the original The Reporter version, as well as in the 2006 Match to Flame anthology. The time settings 2052 and 2053 have also been used, which at times has created an internal contradiction with the year given in the "last year's election" sentence later in the story when it was not adjusted as necessary.) In the city, the sidewalks have fallen into decay. Mead enjoys walking through the city at night, something which no one else does. "In ten years of walking by night or day, for thousands of miles, he had never met another person walking, not one in all that time." On one of his usual walks, he encounters a police car, which is robotic. It is the only police unit in a city of three million, as the purpose of law enforcement has disappeared with everyone watching television at night. When asked about his profession, Mead tells the car that he is a writer, which the car interprets as "no profession" since no one buys books or magazines in the television-dominated society. The police car, which is revealed to have no occupants, cannot understand why Mead would be out walking for no reason, and so it decides to take him to the Psychiatric Center for Research on Regressive Tendencies. As the car passes through his neighborhood, Mead, locked in the confines of the back seat, says, "That's my house", as he points to a warm and bright house with all its lights on, unlike all the other houses. There is no reply, and the story concludes.

== Background ==
The address of the main character, Leonard Mead, happens to be the address of the house in which Bradbury grew up. This has caused speculation that this short story is actually referring to himself, or is in some related way a message to his home town of Waukegan, Illinois.

The 60th anniversary of Fahrenheit 451 contains the short piece "The Story of Fahrenheit 451" by Jonathan R. Eller. In it, Eller writes that Bradbury's inspiration for the story came when he was walking down Wilshire Boulevard in Los Angeles with a friend in late 1949. On their walk, a police cruiser pulled up and asked what they were doing. Bradbury answered, "Well, we're putting one foot in front of the other." The policemen did not appreciate Ray's joke and became suspicious of Bradbury and his friend for walking in an area where there were no pedestrians. Inspired by this experience, he wrote "The Pedestrian", which he sent to his New York agent Don Congdon in March 1950. According to Eller, "[the story's] composition in the early months of 1950 predates Bradbury's conception of 'The Fireman'", the short novella that would later evolve into Fahrenheit 451. In Fahrenheit 451, Leonard's character can be considered similar to that of Clarisse McClellan's uncle, who tells of a similar story repeated by her niece to Montag.

== Adaptations ==
The story was adapted for radio and broadcast on the CBC program Theatre 10:30 (1968-71).

The story was made into an episode of The Ray Bradbury Theater, starring David Ogden Stiers as Leonard Mead. The story adds a second character in the form of Bob Stockwell.

The story was made a part of the Council for the Asian School Certificate Examinations syllabus in 2024.

== See also ==
- Please Hold (2020 film) – Short film
- The Trial – 1925 novel by Franz Kafka
