= Fever Dream (short story) =

Short story by Ray Bradbury

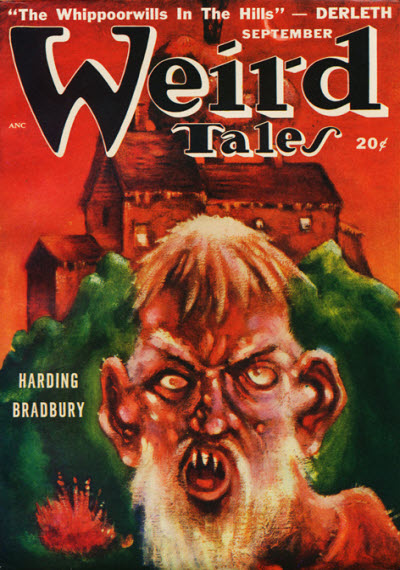
"Fever Dream" was originally published in the September 1948 issue of Weird Tales

"Fever Dream" is a short story written by Ray Bradbury in 1948 for Weird Tales. It deals with the issues and anxieties suffered by teenagers that result from bodily change, in a somewhat Gothic light.

== Plot summary ==
The story concerns Charles, a thirteen-year-old boy who is suffering from a severe illness. The local doctor diagnoses it as scarlet fever, but Charles protests that his hand has "changed" and is no longer under his control. He claims that he has been infected by microbes that are not only causing illness, but literally taking over his body and forming a new being. The doctor, however, assures Charles's parents that this is all in his imagination—a fever dream brought on by his illness.

Charles continues to lose control of his body—first his other hand, then his legs—but the doctor continues to assure him otherwise, and gives him antibiotics to deal with his problems. After Charles tries to choke himself, he is restrained to the bed by his parents. One night, Charles begins to lose control of his body, and he feels himself being taken over by the microbes.

The next morning, Charles appears fully recovered. He is pronounced completely healthy by the astonished doctor, whose hand Charles vigorously shakes. After the doctor leaves, however, Charles brushes his foot over a swarm of red ants on the floorboard in the carriage, killing them on contact. It appears that he has, indeed, been taken over by the microbes in his body.

== Themes and interpretation ==
The story also involves childhood fears of isolation and distrust of adults. The doctor continues to scoff at his illness, and Charles's parents do little to help his situation, and perhaps aggravate it. Fear of not being taken seriously by adults is a common worry of children; children in many ways rely on adults to help them, since they are unable to help themselves.

A literal interpretation of the story leads one to believe that Charles has literally been transformed into a walking disease that can kill other living creatures on contact; however, the way the story is written leaves it open to interpretation. It is possible that the entire story was made up of fever dreams or hallucinations by Charles, or that the illness Charles was suffering triggered latent neuropsychiatric disorder—such as alien hand syndrome, which causes his hand to act independently from the rest of his body. However, the final passages after Charles's recovery strongly suggest that Bradbury did, indeed, intend the literal interpretation.
