= Kit Schluter =

American writer, editor, publisher

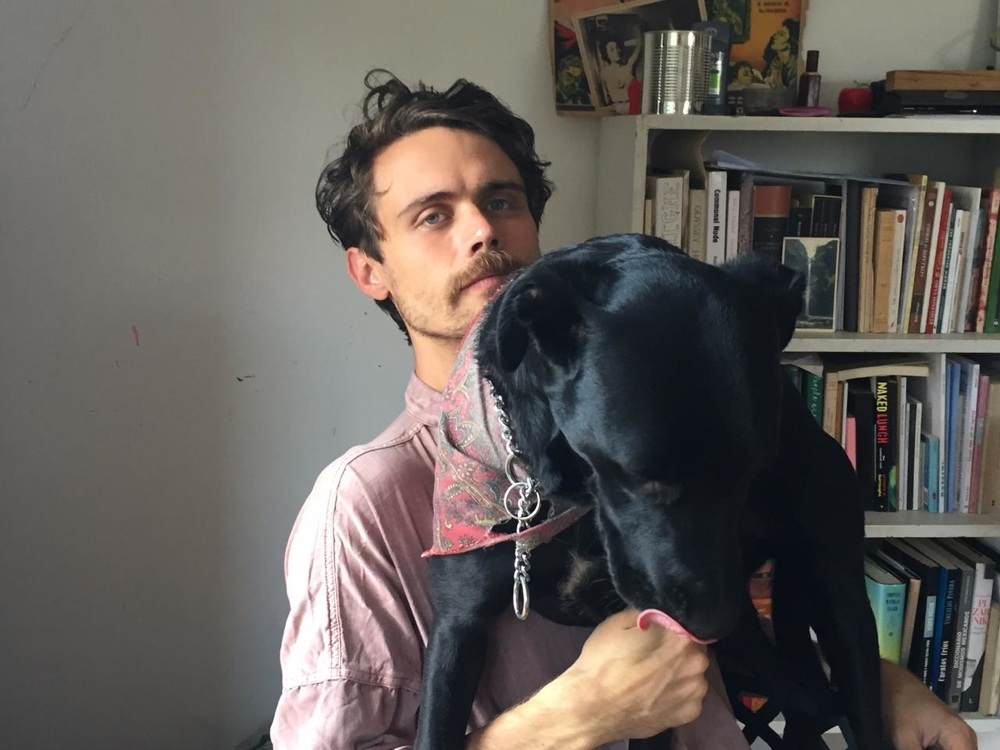
- Education: Brown University
- Occupations: Writer, translator, designer, and publisher
- Writing career
- Language: English, Spanish, French, Occitan
- Genres: Poetry, fiction
- Notable work: Cartoons
- Website: kitschluter.com

Kit Schluter is a writer, translator, designer and publisher. He is the author of the poetry collection Pierrot's Fingernails, as well as Cartoons, a book of stories and drawings published by City Lights. He oversees design at Nightboat Books and has lived in Mexico City since 2017.

== Work ==
An MFA graduate of Brown University, Schluter has translated works by Marcel Schwob, Copi, and Rafael Bernal, among others. Interviews and excerpts have appeared in The Baffler, BOMB, The Paris Review, The Brooklyn Rail, New York Tyrant, Frieze, Boston Review, and more.

== Bibliography ==
=== Translated volumes ===
- City of Rats by Copi (2026). New Directions ISBN 978-0811238373
- Nothing at All by Olivia Tapiero (2026). Nightboat Books ISBN 978-1643622989
- Lantana or, the Indissoluble Exhalation by bruno darío (2025). Ugly Duckling Presse ISBN 978-1946604163
- The Queens Ball by Copi (2025). Inpatient Press ISBN 978-1965874028
- Insistence as a Fine Art by Enrique Vila-Matas (2024). Hanuman Books ISBN 979-8990416505
- Phototaxis by Olivia Tapiero (2021). Nightboat Books ISBN 978-1643621111
- His Name Was Death by Rafael Bernal (2021). New Directions ISBN 978-0811230834
- The Children's Crusade by Marcel Schwob (2018). Wakefield Press ISBN 978-1939663351
- The King in the Golden Mask by Marcel Schwob (2017). Wakefield Press ISBN 978-1939663238
- The Book of Monelle by Marcel Schwob (2012). Wakefield Press ISBN 978-0984115587

=== Books ===
- Cartoons (2024). City Lights ISBN 978-0872869288
- Pierrot's Fingernails (2020). Canarium ISBN 978-1734481617
