= James Crumley =

American author (1939–2008)

- at Bouchercon; Chicago, September 11, 2005
- Born: James Arthur Crumley; October 12, 1939; Three Rivers, Texas, U.S.
- Died: September 17, 2008 (aged 68); Missoula, Montana, U.S.
- Education: Georgia Institute of Technology; Texas A&M University–Kingsville (B.A.); University of Iowa (M.F.A.)
- Occupation: Author
- Spouses: Sandra "Charlie" Crumley; Maggie Brown; Judith Ann Ramey; Bronwyn Pughe; Martha Elizabeth (m. circa 1992)
- Writing career
- Period: 1969–2005
- Genre: hardboiled detective crime
- Notable works: One to Count Cadence; The Last Good Kiss; The Mexican Tree Duck
- Notable awards: Dashiell Hammett Award; 1993 The Mexican Tree Duck

James Arthur Crumley (October 12, 1939 – September 17, 2008) was an American author of violent hardboiled crime novels and several volumes of short stories and essays, as well as published and unpublished screenplays. He has been described as "one of modern crime writing's best practitioners", who was "a patron saint of the post-Vietnam private eye novel" and a cross between Raymond Chandler and Hunter S. Thompson. His book The Last Good Kiss has been described as "the most influential crime novel of the last 50 years."

Crumley's first published novel, 1969's One to Count Cadence, which was set in the Philippines and Vietnam, began as the thesis for his master's degree in creative writing from the Iowa Writers' Workshop in 1966. His novels The Last Good Kiss, The Mexican Tree Duck and The Right Madness feature the character C.W. Sughrue, an alcoholic ex-army officer turned private investigator. The Wrong Case, Dancing Bear and The Final Country feature another P.I., Milo Milodragovitch. In the novel Bordersnakes, Crumley brought both characters together. Crumley said of his two private detectives: "Milo's first impulse is to help you; Sughrue's is to shoot you in the foot."

Crumley had a cult following, and his work is said to have inspired a generation of crime writers in both the U.S. and the U.K, including Michael Connelly, George Pelecanos, Dennis Lehane and Craig McDonald, as well as writers from other genres such as Neal Stephenson, but he never achieved mainstream success. "Don't know why that is," Crumley said in an interview in 2001, "Other writers like me a lot. But up until about 10 to 12 years ago, I made more money in France and Japan than in America. I guess I just don't fit in anyplace in the genre book marketplace."

== Life ==
Crumley, who was born in Three Rivers, Texas, grew up in south Texas, where his father was an oil-field supervisor and his mother was a waitress. According to Crumley, his father was a gentle man, but his mother was a forceful and violent woman. She insisted that Crumley attend church, but did not do so herself because she could not afford clothes decent enough for church.

Crumley was a grade-A student and a football player, an offensive lineman, in high school. He attended the Georgia Institute of Technology on a Navy ROTC scholarship for about a year before leaving to serve in the U.S. Army from 1958 to 1961; during his service, he was assigned to the Philippines. He then resumed his higher education at the Texas College of Arts and Industries on a football scholarship, where he received his B.A. in history in 1964. He earned an M.F.A. degree in fiction at the Iowa Writers' Workshop in 1966. His master's thesis was published as One to Count Cadence in 1969.

In 1968, he signed the "Writers and Editors War Tax Protest" pledge, vowing to refuse tax payments in protest against the Vietnam War.

Crumley had not read any detective fiction until prompted to by Montana poet Richard Hugo, who recommended the work of Raymond Chandler for the quality of his sentences. Crumley finally picked up a copy of one of Chandler's books in Guadalajara, Mexico. Impressed by the oeuvres of Chandler and Ross Macdonald, Crumley began writing his first detective novel, The Wrong Case, which was published in 1975.

From the mid-1980s until his death, Crumley lived in Missoula, Montana, where he served on the English faculty of the University of Montana and found inspiration for his novels at Charlie B's bar. A regular there, he had many longstanding friends who have been portrayed as characters in his books. Following an earlier stint at the University of Montana (1966–1969), he held visiting professorships at a number of other universities, including the University of Arkansas (1969–1970), Colorado State University (1971–1974), Reed College (1976–1977), Carnegie-Mellon University (1979–1980) and the University of Texas at El Paso (1981–1984). From 1974 to 1976, he worked as a freelance writer.

Crumley died at St. Patrick Hospital in Missoula on September 17, 2008, of complications from kidney and pulmonary diseases after many years of health problems. According to longtime friend and fellow writer Thomas McGuane, "He did cocaine six days a week. Ate five times a day. Drank a bottle of whiskey every day. He said, 'This is how I like to live. If I live 10 years less, so what?'" He was survived by his fifth wife of 16 years, Martha Elizabeth, a poet and artist. He had five children (including three from his second marriage and two from his fourth), eight grandchildren and two great-grandchildren.

Crumley's death prompted an "outpouring of affection" from the citizens of Missoula. Crumley's favorite seat in his favorite bar was put aside to honor him.

== Response ==
None of the books that Crumley wrote ever became bestsellers, but he had a cult following devoted to his writing and received frequent critical acclaim. David Dempsey in the New York Times called Crumley's debut novel, One to Count Cadence, set during the Vietnam War, "...a compelling study of the gratuitous violence in men. ... It is a story of bars, brawls, and brothels—and I don't know of any writer who has done it better." In 1993, Marilyn Stasio, reviewing The Mexican Tree Duck in the same publication, wrote: "Characters as memorable as [Crumley's] don't come blazing down the interstate that often. Neither do writers like Mr. Crumley. Treasure them before they burn themselves out—and take the flame with them." Christopher Lehmann-Haupt described Crumley's work as being about "a violently chaotic world that can be seen as a legacy of Vietnam, of which his characters are nightmare-haunted veterans," while Ron Powers called it:

the Big Sky Country [reimagined] as a kind of hard-boiled Lake Wobegon with bloodstains, a hellscape where all the women are tall ... the men sport pugnacious foreheads, brutal jaws and Indian braids, and all the children are away at camp.

According to Patrick Anderson of The Washington Post, "You don't read Crumley for plot. You read him for his outlaw attitude, his rough poetry and his scenes, paragraphs, sentences, moments. You read him for the lawyer with 'a smile as innocent as the first martini'". Critic Maxim Jakubowski, who was a friend of Crumley, writing after Crumley's death, referred to Crumley's last two books, The Final Country and A Right Madness, as:

...bittersweet adventures in which [Crumley] could evoke the skies over Texas and Montana and the landscapes of America like a veritable angel slumming amid the ferocious gunfire, the betrayals his characters always suffered and the trademark bruised romanticism that only he could conjure up without it sounding maudlin.

A number of writers view The Last Good Kiss as Crumley's best work. Its opening line is sometimes cited as the best in the genre:

When I finally caught up with Abraham Trahearne, he was drinking beer with an alcoholic bulldog named Fireball Roberts in a ramshackle joint just outside Sonoma, California, drinking the heart right out of a fine spring afternoon.

== Awards and honors ==
In 1985, The Wrong Case won a Falcon Award from the Maltese Falcon Society of Japan for the best "hardboiled" novel published in that country. The Mexican Tree Duck won the 1994 Dashiell Hammett Award, given by the North American Branch of the International Association of Crime Writers for the best literary crime novel, and his last novel, A Right Madness was a finalist for the 2005 Los Angeles Times Book Prize for Mystery/Thriller.

In 2007, the magazine Men's Journal named The Last Good Kiss as number 12 on its list of "Top 15 Thrillers of All Time", and in Newsweek, George Pelecanos, crime author and co-producer of the HBO series The Wire, rated Crumley's The Last Good Kiss as number 3 in his list of the "Five Most Important Crime Novels".

However, despite claims made on a number of websites, Crumley does not seem to have been either a winner or a nominee for a Mystery Writers of America Edgar Award for The Last Good Kiss or any other novel.

The detective "Crumley" in Ray Bradbury's trilogy of mystery novels (Death Is a Lonely Business, A Graveyard for Lunatics, and Let's All Kill Constance) is named in tribute to him.

== Film ==
For about a decade, Crumley worked intermittently in Hollywood, writing original scripts that were never produced, or acting as a script doctor. In that time he co-wrote with Rob Sullivan the screenplay for the Western film The Far Side of Jericho, which debuted at the Santa Fe Film Festival on December 10, 2006, and was released on DVD in the United States on August 21, 2007. He worked on a number of drafts of the screenplay for the film adaptation of the comic strip Judge Dredd (1995), though none of his ideas were used in the final film. His commissioned but unproduced screenplay for the film The Pigeon Shoot was published in a limited edition. Additionally, Crumley provided the commentary for the 2002 English-language French film L'esprit de la route by Matthieu Serveau.

Regarding his impression of the film industry, Crumley said: "If you back up into a room in Hollywood with your britches down and something odd happens to you, it’s not their fault!"

== Works ==
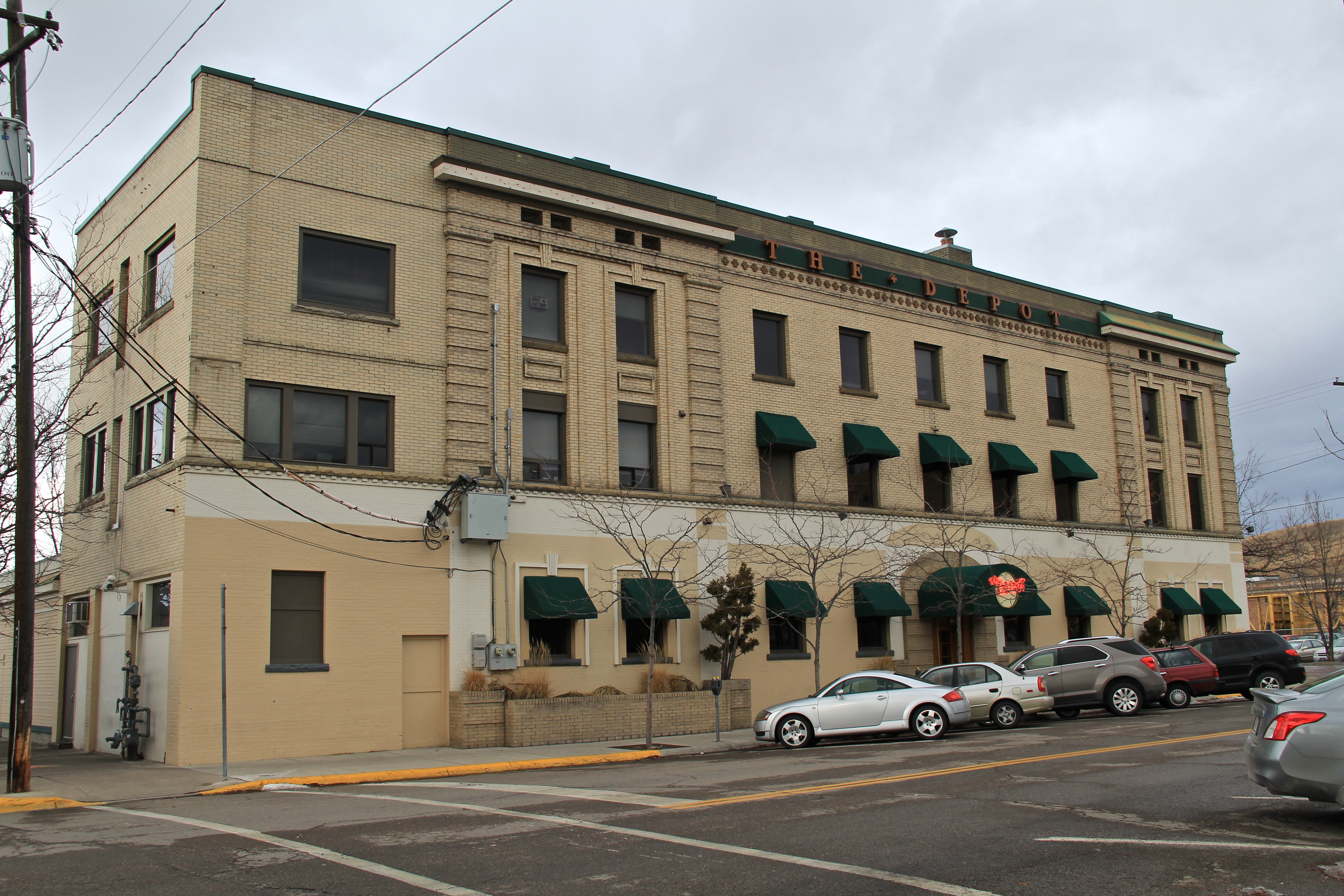
The Depot in Missoula has a bar stool dedicated to James Crumley.

- One to Count Cadence (1969) – novel, Vietnam
- The Wrong Case (1975) – novel, Milo Milodragovitch series
- The Last Good Kiss (1978) – novel, C.W. Sughrue series
- Dancing Bear (1983) – novel, Milo series
- Pigeon Shoot (1987) – unproduced screenplay, limited edition
- Whores (1988) – short stories
- Muddy Fork and Other Things (1991) – short fiction and essays
- The Mexican Tree Duck (1993) – novel, Sughrue series, winner 1994 Dashiell Hammett Award
- Bordersnakes (1996) – novel, Sughrue and Milo series
- The Putt at the End of the World (2000) – collaborative novel
- The Final Country (2001) – novel, Milo series
- The Right Madness (2005) – novel, Sughrue series

== Quotes ==
It's done. This may not be my final country. I can still taste the bear in the back of my throat, bitter with the blood of the innocent, and somewhere in my old heart I can still remember the taste of love. Perhaps this is just a resting place. A warm place to drink cold beer. But wherever my final country is, my ashes will go back to Montana when I die. Maybe I've stopped looking for love. Maybe not. Maybe I will go to Paris. Who knows? But I'll sure as hell never go back to Texas again.

The Final Country (2001)

When I finally caught up with Abraham Trahearne, he was drinking beer with an alcoholic bulldog named Fireball Roberts in a ramshackle joint just outside Sonoma, California, drinking the heart right out of a fine spring afternoon.

The Last Good Kiss (1978)

Son, never trust a man who doesn't drink because he's probably a self-righteous sort, a man who thinks he knows right from wrong all the time. Some of them are good men, but in the name of goodness, they cause most of the suffering in the world. They're the judges, the meddlers. And, son, never trust a man who drinks but refuses to get drunk. They're usually afraid of something deep down inside, either that they're a coward or a fool or mean and violent. You can't trust a man who's afraid of himself. But sometimes, son, you can trust a man who occasionally kneels before a toilet. The chances are that he is learning something about humility and his natural human foolishness, about how to survive himself. It's damned hard for a man to take himself too seriously when he's heaving his guts into a dirty toilet bowl.

The Wrong Case (1975)

== Archival sources ==
- The James Crumley Papers are housed at the Wittliff Collections, Texas State University in San Marcos.
