= Dainzú =

Zapotec archaeological site in Oaxaca, Mexico

- Dainzú - Relief # 86
- Interactive map of Dainzú
- 17°0′13″N 96°33′25″W
- Periods: Mesoamerican Preclassical & Classical
- Cultures: Zapotec
- Location: Valle de Tlacolula, Oaxaca; Mexico

History
- Built: Around 700 BCE

Site notes
- Website: Dainzú Archaeological Site – INAH

Dainzú is a Zapotec archaeological site located in the eastern side of the Valles Centrales de Oaxaca, about 20 km south-east of the city of Oaxaca, Oaxaca State, Mexico. It is an ancient village near to and contemporary with Monte Albán and Mitla, with an earlier development. Dainzú was first occupied 700-600 BC but the main phase of occupation dates from about 200 BC to 350 AD. The site was excavated in 1965 by Mexican archaeologist Ignacio Bernal.

== Toponymy ==
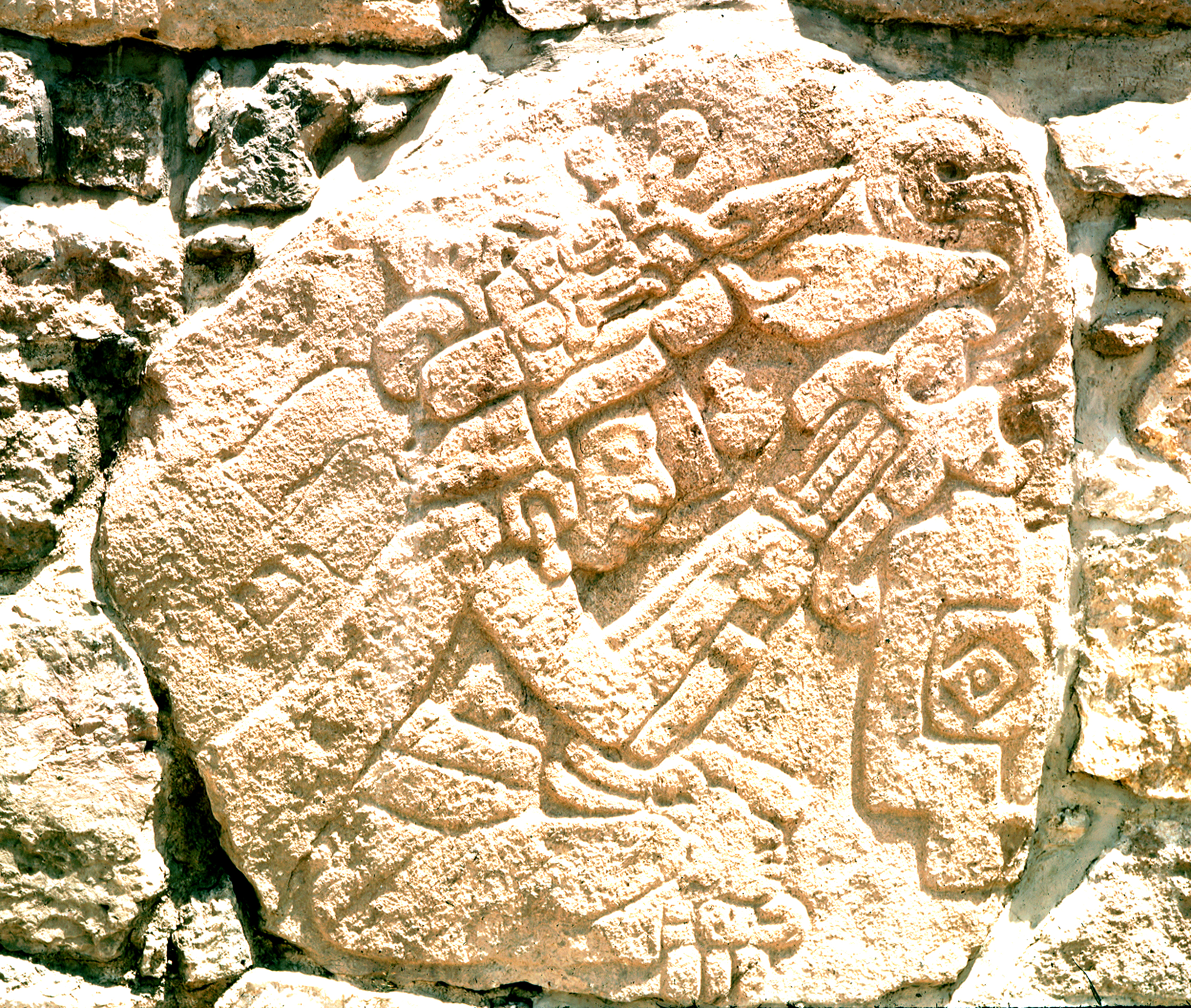
Ballgame player bas-relief.

The original name of this town is unknown. The archaeological site is named from the word Dannizhú, used by ancient inhabitants to refer the site, at the time when Bernal made local inquiries. Dainzú means hill of the organ cactus in Zapotec, it is formed from two Zapotec words: danni meaning "hill" and zu meaning "organ cactus".

Another name used for the archaeological site is "Quiabelagayo", which in Zapotec means "five flowers". This is also the meaning of Macuilxochitl (in Nahuatl), which is part of the name of the town closest to Dainzú.

== History ==
The founding chronology of Dainzú is uncertain. However, it seems possible that the site was occupied some centuries before the foundation of Monte Albán, as evidenced by the corresponding Rosario Phase ceramics found in the central valleys of Oaxaca (700 – 500 BCE). At that time, Dainzú was one of the main villages of the Tlacolula Valley. It was contemporary to other important population centers such as San José Mogote in the Etla Valley. As was the case with other villages of the region, Dainzú must have contributed to the foundation of Monte Albán, contributing to a decrease in its population around 200 BCE. In spite of the rise of Monte Albán, Dainzú maintained a dynamic of its own and positioned itself as one of the most important cities during the Mesoamerican Classic period. Finally the decline of Monte Albán led to the reshuffling of relations between the villages of the region, which also affected Dainzú and caused its decline.

There are numerous archaeological sites on the banks of the Rio Salado, including the early village of Abasolo. To the west of Dainzú is farmland where Rosario Phase ceramics found confirm an occupation from 750 BCE.

== Archaeological Site ==
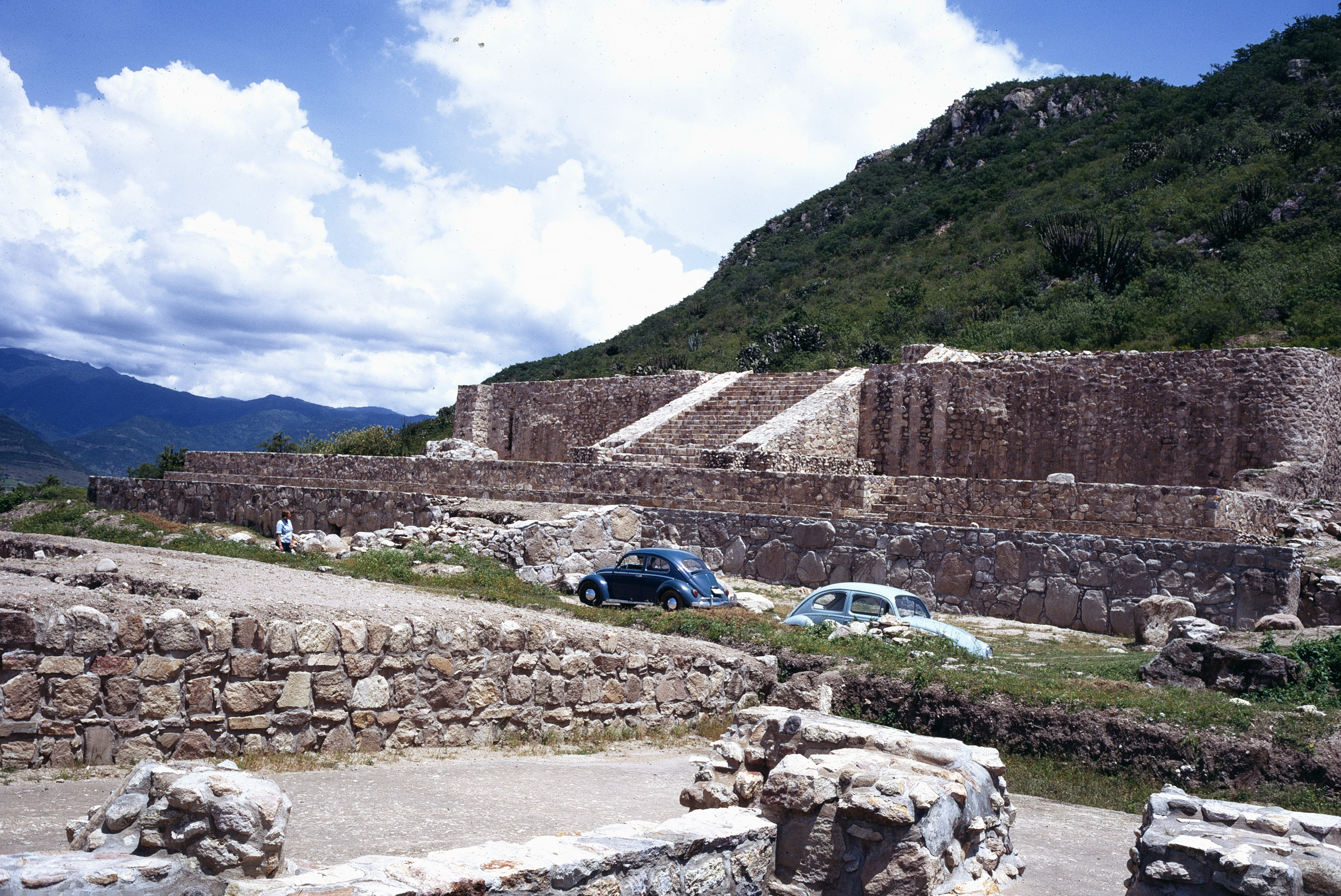
Group A at Dainzú

The architectural style of this site is important due to the unique structure characteristics that distinguish it from others in the Valley of Oaxaca; these reflect a high artistic quality, as in the case of the lower platform of building A, which has a bas-reliefs gallery representing, what have long been thought to be, ballgame players. However, new interpretations of these figures have recently been proposed.

During its urban stage, Dainzú functioned as a second rank village, in terms of economic, political and religious importance. The main occupation corresponds to a transition period called II-IIIa, at approximately 250 to 350 CE.

Dainzú built against a hill, apparently for aesthetic reasons the original entrance was on the side of the River at the west end. Had a long occupation sequence from 600 BCE to 1,200 CE, although there is a possibility, according to archaeological evidence, there is a possibility that the area was occupied before Monte Albán, Dainzú apogee occurred from 600 BCE to 200 CE.

The site is located beside a tributary of the Rio Salado, while steps and chambers carved into the rock on the peak above perhaps belonged to a shrine.

== Structures ==
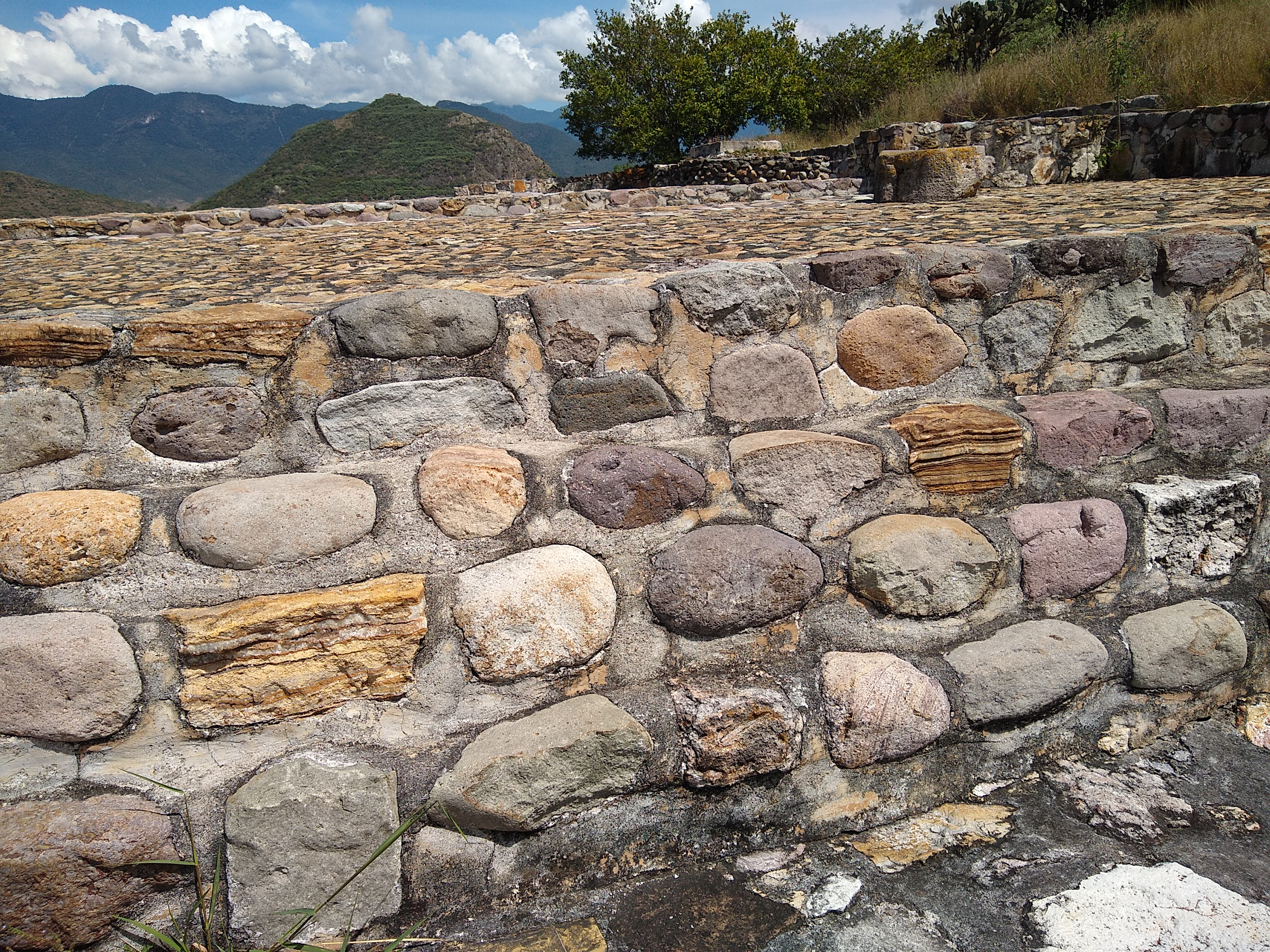
Stone steps at Dainzu - upper platform steps with a mixture of stones including ones with crystals

The stone used for construction at Dainzú is mainly from river cobbles formed from volcanic rock such as basalt.

All building construction was adjusted to the site topography.

Only three structures have been explored thus far:

=== Building A ===
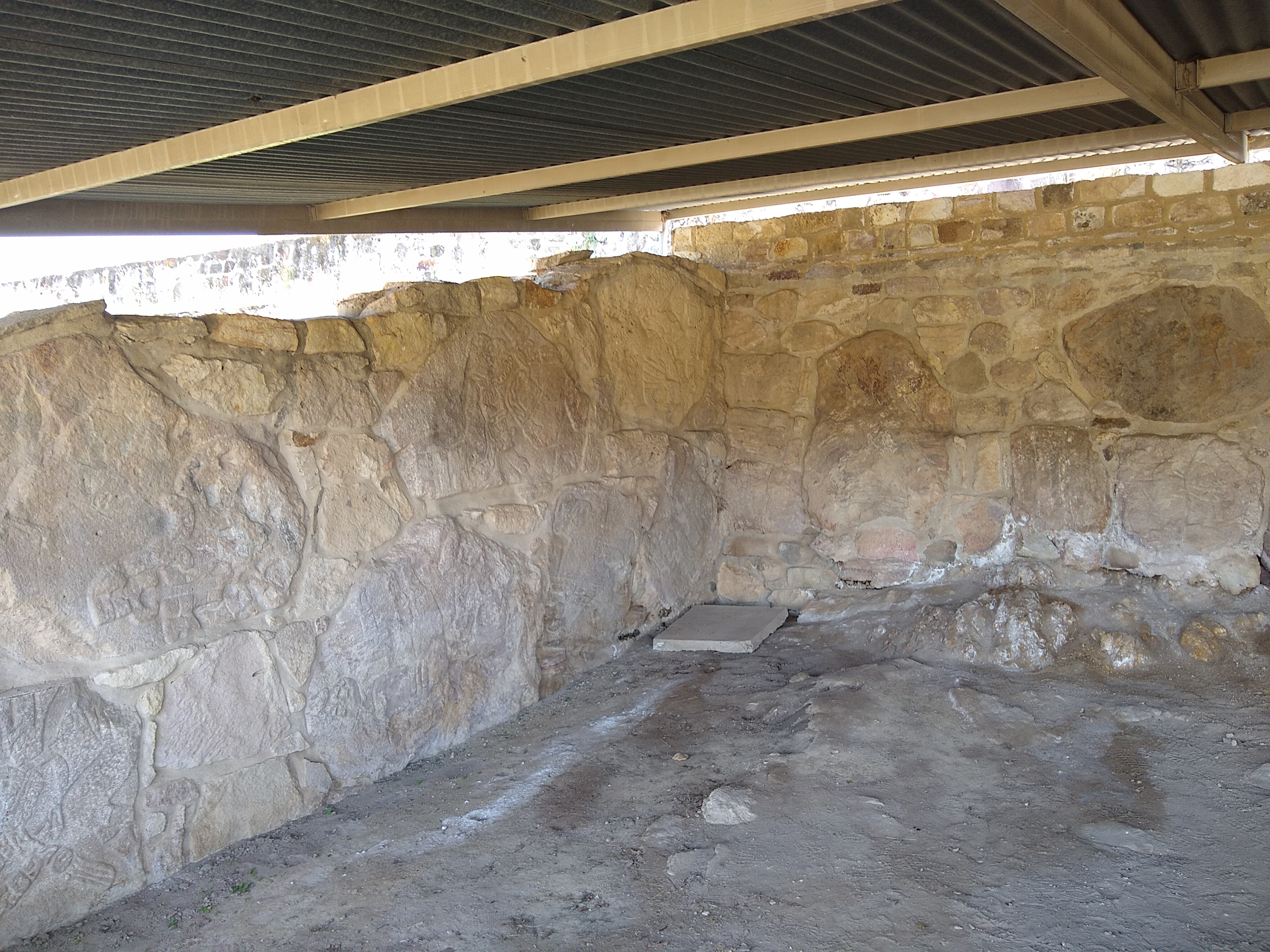
Sculpture Gallery at Dainzu Archaeological Site

Located in the highest part of the site, apparently had religious purposes. Its construction is staggered, four platforms built with stones and clay, building four platforms, most interesting are the bas-reliefs decorating the bottom of the south wall of the lower body, called sculpture gallery, every stone contains figures with motion, there are not two the same and complete in varied positions. According to Ignacio Bernal hypothesis, these represent ballgame players whose position reveals movement, probably were placed during a reconstruction of the platform, reason there does not seem to be any arrangement.

The structure is a large platform built against the west-facing hillside and has about 35 bas-reliefs carved into the southern side of its lower wall. Most of these represent ball-players, while four represent the four ballgame deities. Interspersed among the representations of ballplayers are a small number of bas-reliefs depicting priests making offerings, these stones are incised with calendrical dates and may represent specific rituals related to the ballgame.

It is the oldest terrace, constructive characteristics have similarities with J building at Monte Albán.

Comprises three terraces superimposed on the hill, is connected with building B by means of a stuccoed patio. It has two facades (north and south) with a large stairway in the center.

The upper terrace is the highest and is formed by an almost vertical wall of more than 5 meters high with rounded corners, access was through a roofed stepped indoor passage. During investigations, four rooms were found, roof made by large stones placed at an angle, as in some of the Monte Albán tombs.

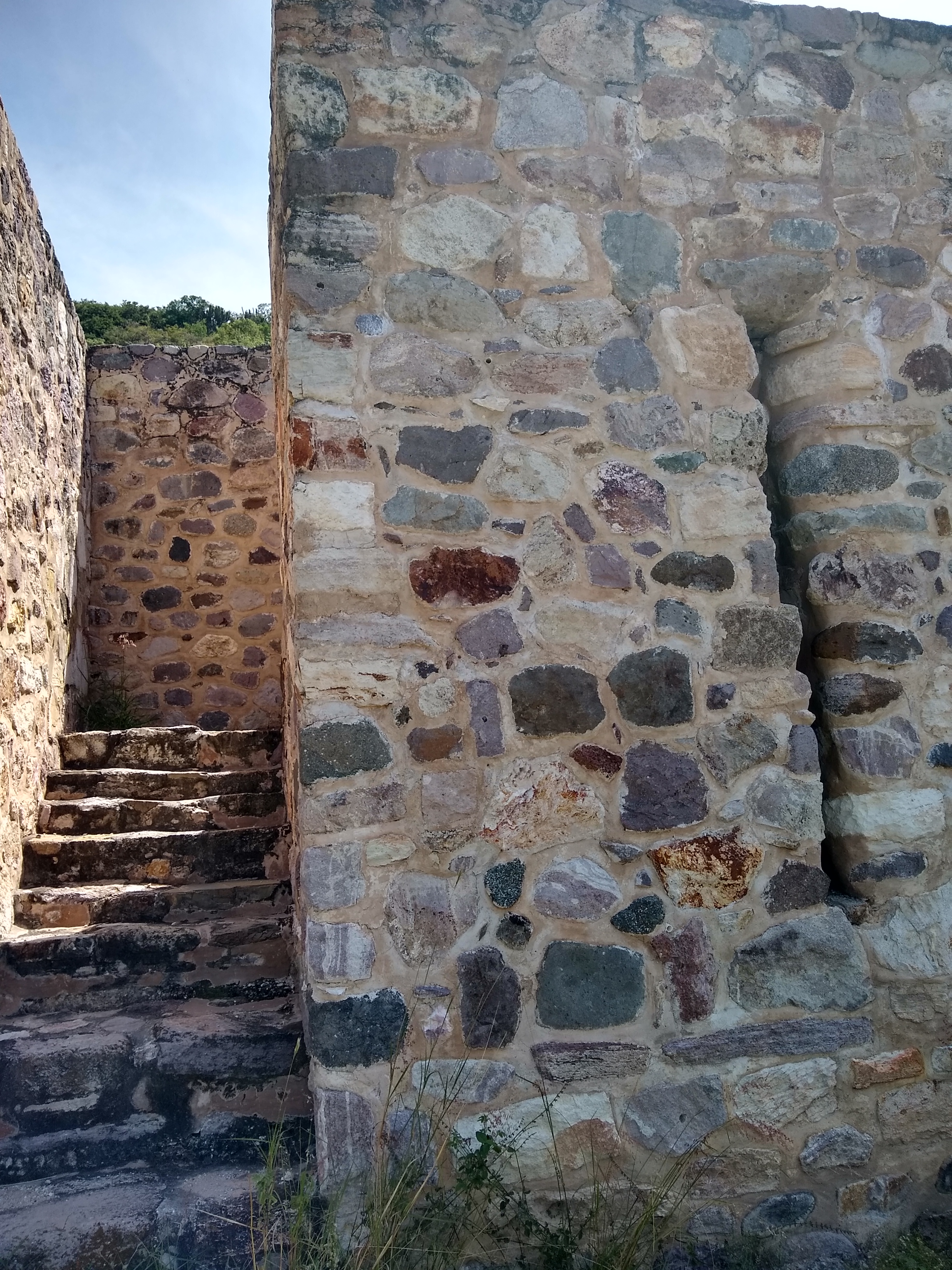
Steps to the lower terrace in the southwest corner of the upper building

The lower terrace forms a 1.25 meter vertical wall. Entrance is by a stairway system recessed in the wall, at the southwest corner.

On the north side the relief is different from the rest. The terrace has a central stairway.

During the different construction stages, changes were made, for example the addition of rooms, stairways and walls, with the essential aim of repairing building damages and prepare for new and other uses.

At the hill summit of this building, is a large number of natural rocks protruding from the vegetation and representing severed heads, probably related to ball players.

=== Bas-Reliefs Gallery ===
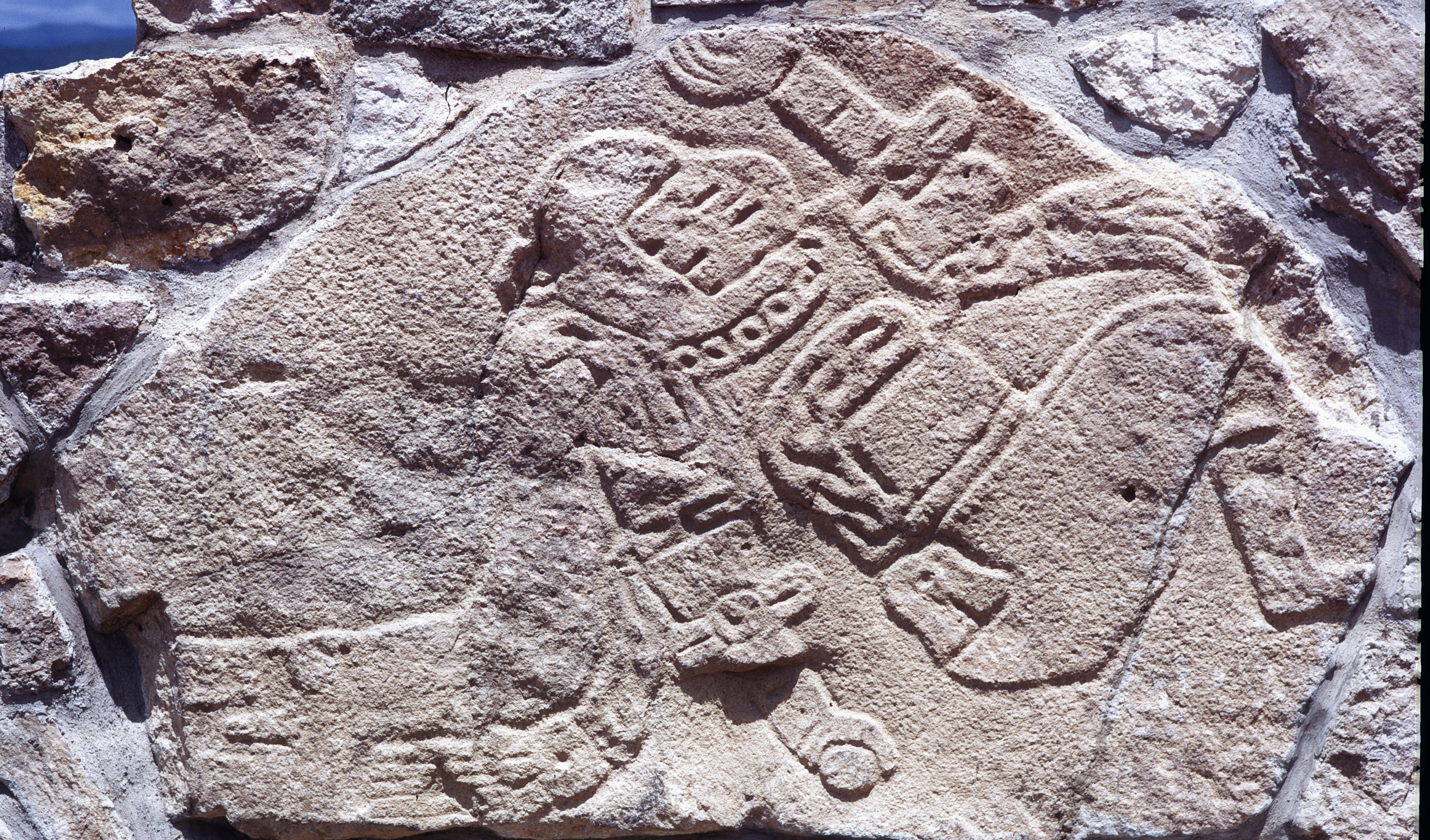
Bas-Relief in sculpture gallery

These representations are unique in Mesoamerica the bas-reliefs portray religious dignitaries as well as ball players holding a small ball in a hand.

The site features a gallery of carved stone bas-reliefs similar in style to the danzante bas-reliefs at Monte Albán. Forty-seven of these represent ball-players wearing protective equipment such as helmets, knee-guards and gauntlets and holding a small ball in one hand. A large ball-court was found nearby, with an east–west orientation. Further bas-reliefs are carved into the living rock of the hilltop shrine.

The presence of skulls may be an indication of the symbolism associated with the game.

== Bas-Relief Interpretation ==
Although a minority of researchers suggest that the reliefs are of fighters, perhaps hurling stones, the strong consensus is that they portray ballplayers. According to researcher Heather Orr, the reliefs form a processional sequence, showing specific moments from a ritual "fixed ball game with human sacrifice as the final outcome".

== Building B ==
Located west of complex A. Comprises a huge structure with a set of large walls rooms and beautiful stairways and patios that provide access to their different parts and correspond to different constructive times. It has six architectonic overlays, corresponding to different periods; the building has an important tomb with a jaguar bas-relief on a monolithic rock that forms the entrance. The head of the jaguar is engraved in the lintel with the forelegs flanking the entrance.

The constructions simplicity and generosity of open spaces in plazas or patios, lead to imagine civic or popular activities.

Access to this building is very characteristic: entrance was through the terrace bottom or plaza, via a staircase attached to the wall and crossed by a roofed hallway roofed with large monolithic stone slabs.

Originally this complex had two separate terraces, which were connected by the "Templo Amarillo ". There are underground drainage channels for rainwater in several places. These are well constructed with rectangular cross-section.

Inside the terraces, four funerary chambers were found and several simpler tombs.

The most important tomb (tomb 7), was completely private and access was through a stairway.

=== Tomb 7 ===
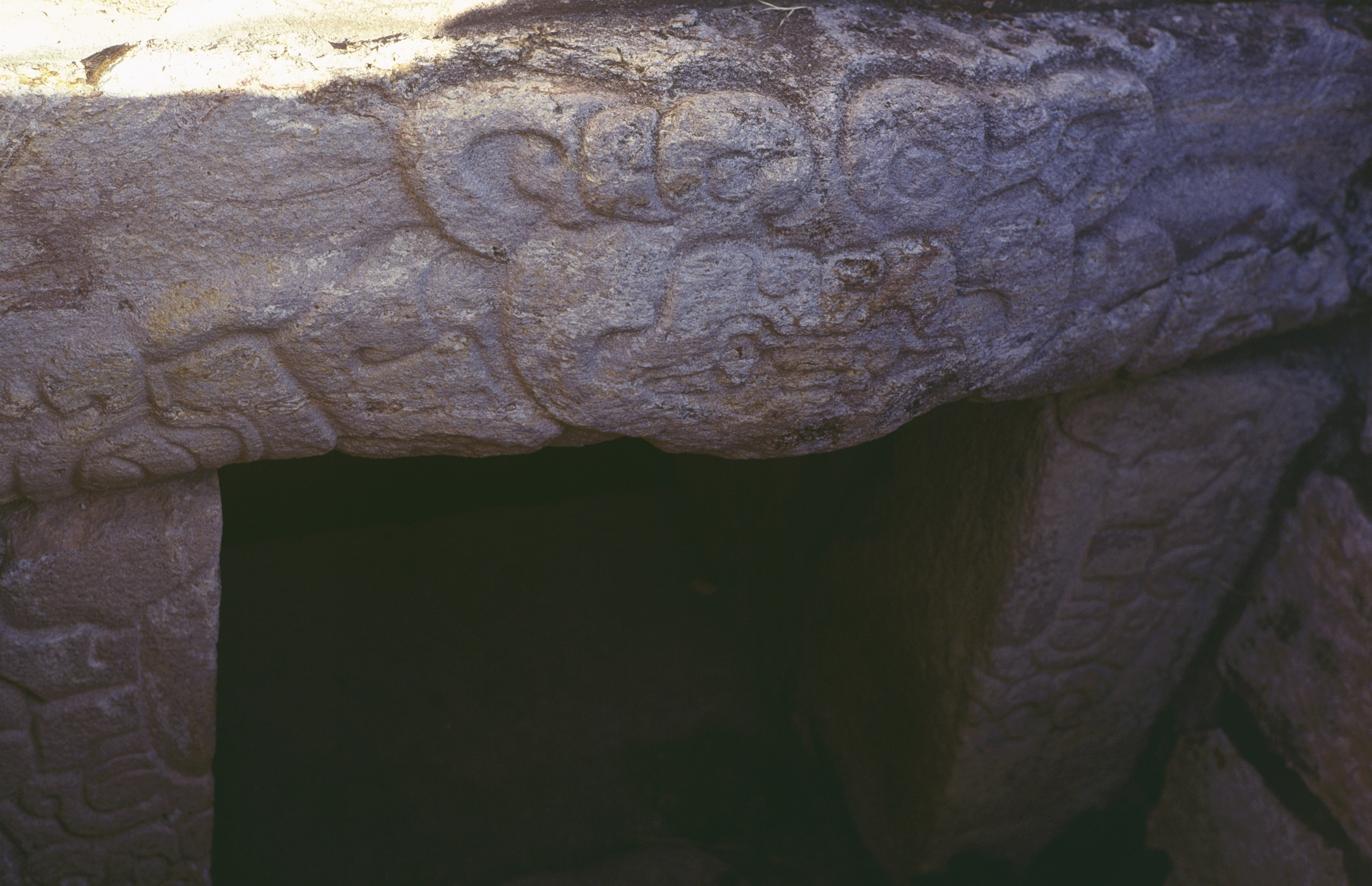
Tomb 7 entrance

It was built in the central part of building B with engraved stone walls and niches. The roof consists of a monolithic stone. The entrance has a Jaguar figure, the head is engraved in the lintel and the forelegs flank the entrance.

This tomb was looted perhaps in prehispanic times, hence it is partially destroyed.

Chronologically the Tomb corresponds to the Monte Alban II-III A era (200 to 600 CE).

== Templo amarillo ==
It is a small adobe and stone construction located inside building B, it is certainly an altar built over a stuccoed platform, it faces a small patio to the west, the portico is composed of two monolithic (Monte Albán style) cylindrical columns on the right side, a rectangular niche was found. The entire building was painted yellow ochre. It might have had a religious significance as its orientation.

== Group C ==
This structure connected to the south with group B, of the same height. It is really a small terrace that connected to the south with Group D, not yet excavated.

== Ballgame Court ==
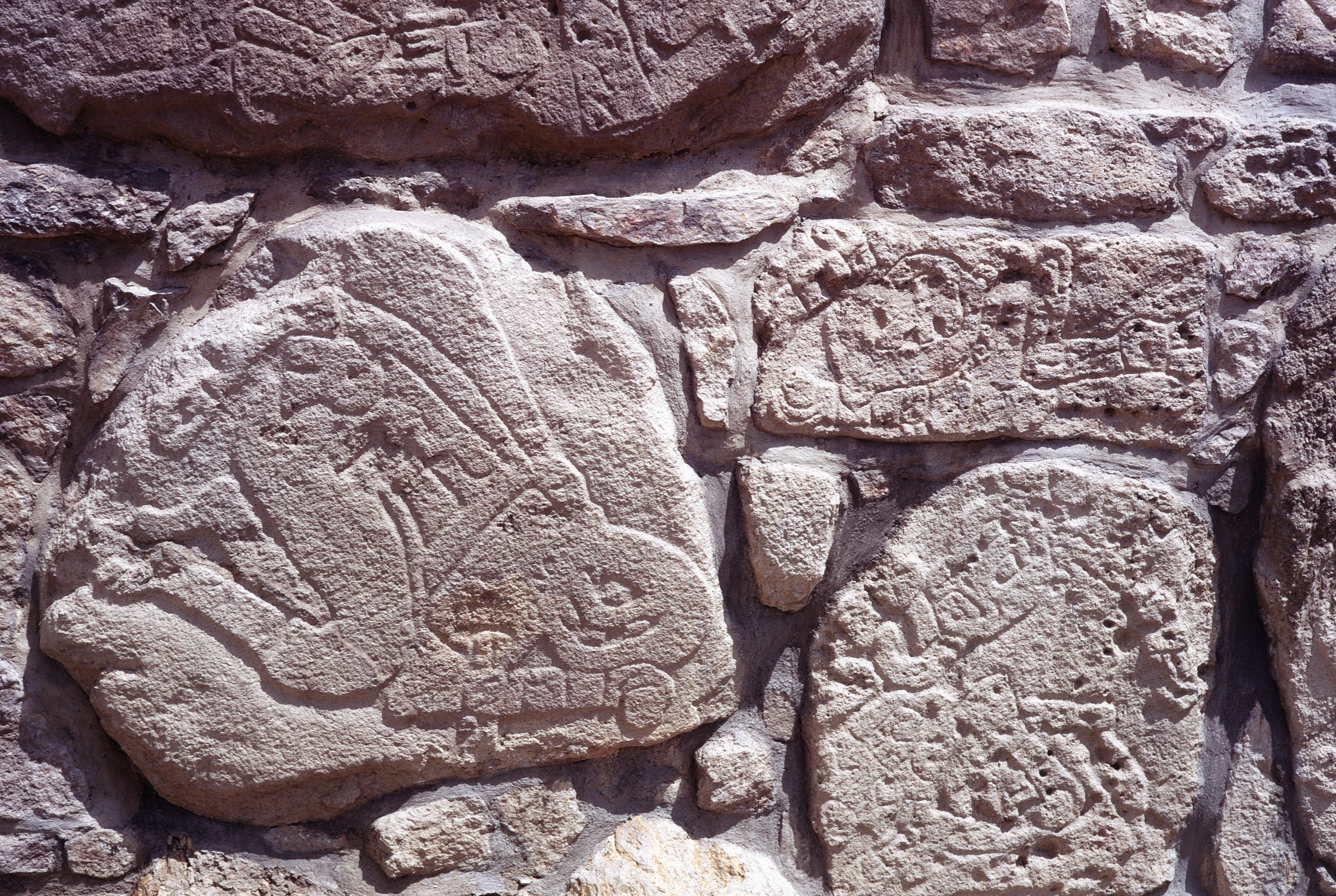
Ballgame players

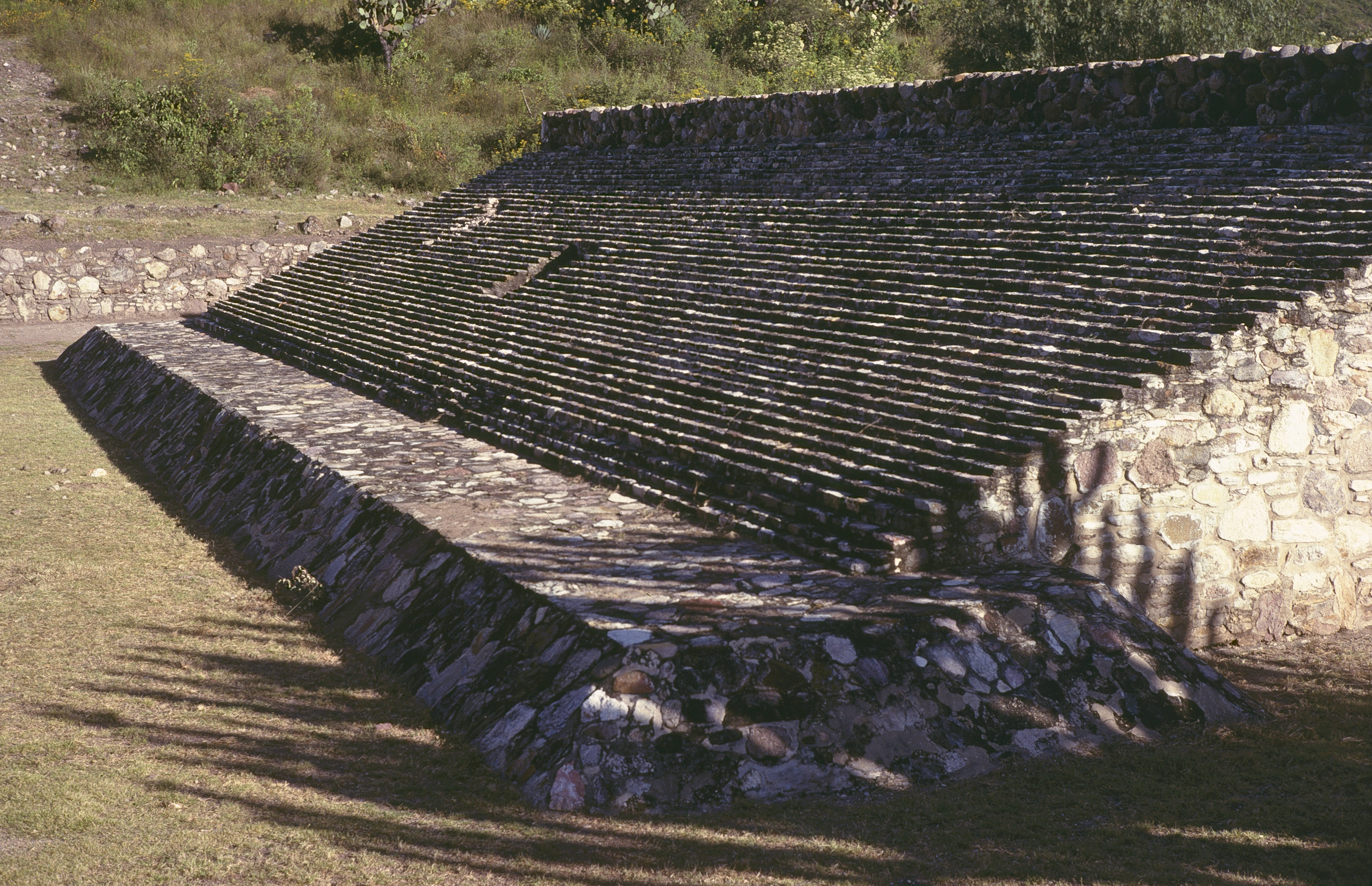
Ballgame court, Restored side

Only one half of the ballgame court has been excavated and restored; It has small stone blocks resembling steps and were covered with stucco to form a sloped surface.

Located in the center of a large square. Seen in architectural plant, it is I-shaped, as the Monte Albán and Yagul ballgame courts. It is oriented east–west, characteristic of all Mesoamerican ballgame courts.

During its investigation, anthropomorphic reliefs were found, representing ballgame players, confirming the ritual importance of this activity in the area.

Was built with engraved irregular stones jointed with clay mortar and pebbles or remnants of ceramics; It was covered with a thin stucco layer.

Players clothing consisted of a very particular combination of pants, knee pads, face masks or feline helmets and tapes among other elements.

In Dainzú are represented two types of ballgame; one corresponds to images of older reliefs, gloves are used to catching, hitting or throwing the ball; the other was played at a later time in the I-shaped ballgame courts, the ball was stroked or launched with the hips. This latest version of the game is known with the name of olomaliztli.

== See also ==
- Lambityeco
- Mitla
- Monte Albán
- San José Mogote
- Valley of Oaxaca
- Yagul
- Zaachila
