= Inpatient Press =

New York City-based independent publisher

- "We publish what others do not."
- Logos of Inpatient Press (left) and its translation imprint Mercurial Editions (right)
- Status: Active
- Founded: 2013; 13 years ago
- Founder: Mitch Anzuoni; Rory Hamovit
- Country of origin: United States
- Headquarters location: New York City
- Distribution: MIT Press (via Penguin Random House)
- Key people: Mitch Anzuoni (editor)
- Publication types: Books, zines, video games
- Fiction genres: Experimental literature, poetry, translation, art books, facsimile reprints
- Imprints: Mercurial Editions; Inpatient Interactive
- Official website: inpatientpress.net

Inpatient Press is an American independent publisher based in New York City. Founded in Brooklyn in 2013, it publishes fiction, poetry, literary translations, art books, and facsimile reprints of periodicals and other printed ephemera, and it releases video games through a division called Inpatient Interactive. The press is known for selling its publications from coin-operated newspaper boxes placed on New York City sidewalks. Its books have been distributed by the MIT Press since 2025.

== History ==
Inpatient Press was started in the fall of 2013 by Mitch Anzuoni and Rory Hamovit, who met at Bard College and initially published mail art work by friends before broadening the list. Hamovit, a photographer, later left to pursue an MFA at the Yale School of Art. Anzuoni, who studied computer science and creative writing, has since run the press as its editor and designer while working as a technical consultant for a high-energy biophysics research lab. Since 2016, the press has operated from an office in Boerum Hill, Brooklyn.

Anzuoni has described the press's credo as "publishing what others do not." By 2023 it was issuing six or seven titles a year, typically in print runs of about 1000 copies, printed and bound in Reykjavík. In 2022 the press launched a translation imprint, Mercurial Editions.

For its first eleven years the press had no trade distributor, and Anzuoni said he personally mailed every order. In September 2024 the MIT Press announced that it would distribute Inpatient's backlist and new titles from spring 2025 through Penguin Random House.

== Publications ==
=== Books ===
The press's early list centered on small-run artist books and chapbooks. Its first title by the artist and poet Rindon Johnson, and Johnson's first book, was Nobody Sleeps Better Than White People (2016), a 28-page chapbook pairing poems with photographs. The chapbook was later reissued in a second, expanded edition. In 2017 the press published The Tonebook, a color collection of graphic scores by experimental composers including Lea Bertucci, Eli Keszler, Zeena Parkins, Phill Niblock, Raven Chacon, and Aki Onda; The Wire reproduced a selection of the scores on the book's release.

Whore Foods (2019), an erotic novella by LA Warman expanded from the author's newsletter, won the 2020 Lambda Literary Award for LGBTQ Erotica. Big Joe (2021), an illustrated erotic novella by Samuel R. Delany with artwork by Drake Carr and Sabrina Bockler, won the same award in 2022.

The press has continued to work with Johnson, often alongside galleries and museums. The Law of Large Numbers (2021), a 234-page volume of his writings alongside sketchbook pages, CCTV stills, and other research material, was co-published with SculptureCenter and Chisenhale Gallery to accompany his exhibitions in New York and London, and Ever Given (2022), a collection of poetry and visual work built from the titles of his artworks, was produced with the gallery François Ghebaly in an edition of 500. Spencer Longo's TIME (2022), a book of collages made from pages of Time magazine, was published in conjunction with an exhibition at the gallery King's Leap and reviewed in The Brooklyn Rail. For Poets, Gamblers, Fools, a 2023 two-person exhibition by Jon Rafman and Parker Ito at the New York gallery Lubov, the press published an edition of 100 comprising four risograph prints by Ito, a flip book and a CD by Rafman, and a mylar print, along with Rafman's accompanying album Musique pour le Chevalier aux Fleurs.

=== Mercurial Editions ===
The imprint's first title was Rip It Up (2022), Daniel Joseph's translation of Kō Machida's Akutagawa Prize-winning novella Kiregire. Reviewing it in The Japan Times, Iain Maloney noted that Machida's work had a reputation for being extremely difficult to translate; in Metropolis he wrote that larger publishers had passed on the book and that "it took Inpatient, a small press with nothing to lose, to take the chance." The book was also included in GQ's 2022 "Hype List".

Desiderata (2022), Emma Ramadan's translation of Lizzy Mercier Descloux's 1977 collection of poems and collages, was issued in a tête-bêche format with a facsimile of the French original. Patrick Lyons, reviewing it in BOMB, praised the translation and the decision to preserve the original layout.

Further titles include The Commune (2023), Chloe Tsolakoglou's translation of the final novel by the Greek writer Marios Chakkas, reviewed in Jacobin; The Queens' Ball (2024), Kit Schluter's translation of the 1977 novel by the Argentine-French writer Copi, the first English translation of the book; Eternal Current Events (2024), Jackson B. Smith's translation of Chris Marker's early writings for the magazine Esprit, excerpted in The Baffler; Six Films (2025) by Marguerite Duras, translated by Olivia Baes and Emma Ramadan, an excerpt of which appeared in The Paris Review; and The Spiritual Hunt (2025) translated by Emine Ersoy, the first English translation of the disputed Arthur Rimbaud manuscript published by Mercure de France in 1949.

=== Facsimiles and ephemera ===
The press also reissues archival and found printed matter. Armageddon News collects material from fake "underground" newspapers produced by the Federal Bureau of Investigation under COINTELPRO to target student activists, and Universal Hedonics reproduces patent diagrams and abstracts for neurotechnology and directed-energy devices. In 2019, with the Brooklyn film venue Light Industry, it reissued Peggy Ahwesh's 1995 zine The Films of Doris Wishman in an expanded facsimile edition of 500, adding a transcript of Ahwesh's 1994 interview with Doris Wishman. In January 2026 the press published Search & Destroy: The Complete Archive, a single-volume reprint of all eleven issues of V. Vale's San Francisco punk zine Search & Destroy (1977–1979), edited by Vale, Cecily Chen, and Anzuoni.

== Distribution ==
An Inpatient Press newspaper box in New York City

Inpatient Press sells books, zines, posters, and prints from refurbished newspaper boxes on New York City sidewalks, which open for a quarter. Anzuoni placed the first box, painted yellow, outside the Whitney Museum of American Art in 2019 with the permission of the city's Department of Transportation. Within a week, museum staff had treated it as lost property and it had been destroyed at a scrapyard in Red Hook; the Whitney sent Anzuoni a written apology and a check reimbursing the cost of the box. By late 2022 the press operated boxes in locations including Clinton Hill and Chinatown, and in 2023 the journalist Riccardo Staglianò reported three boxes in Manhattan and Brooklyn, with plans for others in Los Angeles and Paris. Anzuoni has also sold books from pockets sewn into the lining of a trench coat.

The press's titles are also carried by bookstores including McNally Jackson and Printed Matter in New York, and by shops in Paris, Berlin, Brussels, Mexico City, and Hong Kong.

== Inpatient Interactive ==
In 2021 the press began releasing video games as Inpatient Interactive, a studio founded by Anzuoni and the artist Peter Christian. Its first game, Small Press Tycoon (2021), is a simulation of running a small publisher in which the player balances metrics such as "hipness" and "quality" while printing chapbooks, discovering authors, and winning awards. Harper's Magazine printed a transcript of gameplay from the game in the "Readings" section of its October 2021 issue.

Mezzanine (2022), a first-person point-and-click adventure in which the player is a human-resources administrator working late at a fictional multimedia startup in San Francisco on the eve of Y2K, was presented in "First Look", a series of online exhibitions co-presented by Rhizome and the New Museum. Anzuoni and Christian performed a live playthrough of the game at the New Museum on October 15, 2022.

Ex Libris (2026) is a role-playing game set in the library of a fictional medieval monastery, the Abbey of Thélème, in which the player deciphers languages and uncovers texts. Anzuoni built it with FromSoftware's Sword of Moonlight, a 2000 role-playing game construction kit based on the King's Field engine, and drew on the writings of Umberto Eco, François Rabelais, Clark Ashton Smith, and Marguerite Porete. James Folta of Literary Hub described it as the studio's most literary work and compared playing it to reading a hypertext novel or Borges rather than to conventional competitive play. In 2026 the studio was developing Offshore, an isometric simulation of building a money-laundering network.

== Reception ==
In Artforum's "Top Ten" column in April 2022, the sound artist Lea Bertucci called Inpatient "without a doubt one of the most rigorous and interesting small presses operating today," describing it as "a collecting bin for obscure smut, adventurous contemporary poetry, political minefields, and possible mind-control technologies." Writing in The New York Review of Books in 2018, Barry Yourgrau characterized it as "an adventurous small publisher." In a 2022 profile for The New Yorker, Adam Iscoe focused on the press's unconventional distribution methods, particularly its use of coin-operated newspaper boxes. In 2026, James Folta of Literary Hub discussed Inpatient's books and video games as related experiments in literary form and material publishing.

== Awards ==
- 2020 Lambda Literary Award, LGBTQ Erotica: Whore Foods by LA Warman
- 2022 Lambda Literary Award, LGBTQ Erotica: Big Joe by Samuel R. Delany
