= Quiabelagayo =

Zapotec name

Quiabelagayo (alternatively written Guiebelagayo or Quiepelagayo) is a Zapotec name associated particularly with the Oaxacan Valley pre-Columbian site of Dainzu (known also as Macuilxochitl or Macuilsuchil). In Zapotec mythology and religion, Quiabelagayo has been interpreted by some researchers such as Alfonso Caso and Ignacio Bernal as a local Oaxacan equivalent of the central Mexican deity Macuilxochitl, or "Five Flower".

In post-conquest censuses and maps of the region, particularly the Relacion geografica de Macuilxochitl , Quiabelagayo is marked as the indigenous Zapotec toponym for the town San Mateo Macuilxochitl, the settlement adjoining the site of Dainzu.

The derivation of the name is uncertain. John Paddock deconstructs the name Quiabelagayo as composed of the Zapotec word-stems for "rock", "serpent", and "five". Pictographically the Relacion geografica de Macuilxochitl translates or associates the name as "five flower". Joseph Whitecotton suggests that quia- should be read as "rock" or "hill" instead of "flower", and proposes that bela or pela means "reed"; therefore quiabelagayo can with justification be interpreted as "Hill of 5-Reed".
