= David Corbett =

David Corbett is the name of:

- David Corbett (footballer, born 1910) (1910–1995), Scottish professional footballer
- David Corbett (footballer, born 1940) (1940–2020), English professional footballer
- David Corbett (author) (born 1953), American author
- David Corbett (lawyer), Canadian lawyer
