= The Spiritual Hunt =

Lost poem written by Arthur Rimbaud

The original 1949 edition of The Spiritual Hunt by Mercure de France, with an introduction by Pascal Pia

The Spiritual Hunt (French: La Chasse spirituelle) is a prose poem purportedly written by French writer Arthur Rimbaud, claimed to be his masterpiece by his friend and lover Paul Verlaine. Supposedly strongly resembling in form the only book he published during his lifetime, A Season in Hell, the poem is considered to be one of the most famous lost artworks, despite the fact that in 1949, a twelve-page work by the same title was unveiled to the public by Pascal Pia; Rimbaud scholars, almost unanimously, have denounced this poem as a literary forgery. The 1949 text was translated into English by Emine Ersoy and published by Inpatient Press in 2025.

== The poem ==
The poem was first mentioned by Paul Verlaine, who claimed to have forgotten its manuscript back with his wife Mathilde in Paris, after leaving the capital for Brussels to reunite with Rimbaud in July 1873. Since it was around this time that Mathilde discovered Rimbaud's "obscene and sexual letters" to Verlaine, Jacques Bienvenu has tried to demonstrate that Verlaine may have even invented the existence of the poem, wanting to subsequently present Rimbaud's letters as a work of fiction. Even though Edmund White believes that the poem had, in fact, existed and that Mathilde destroyed it along with the letters – but not before using them to win her lawsuit for separation from Verlaine in 1874 – he notes that "[i]n his overvaluation of this lost text, Verlaine seems clearly to have been what we might now call a drama queen; he couldn't remember a single line from it later, or even its title."

== The forgery ==
Almost sixty years after Rimbaud's death, on 19 May 1949, Pascal Pia – who by that time had already published three authentic texts by Rimbaud (but who was also known as a forger of Apollinaire, Baudelaire and Radiguet) – to the amazement of the French literary scene, presented for the first time the supposed text of The Spiritual Hunt; extracts of the poem appeared in the newspaper Combat before the integral poem was published a few days later by Mercure de France. However, in a long essay titled "Flagrant crime" and published in Le Figaro in July 1949, André Breton exposed the work as a forgery, and pointed Akakia Viala, a theatre director, and Nicolas Bataille, an actor, as the authors of the fake.

Both Viala and Bataille admitted the crime, claiming that the text had been intended as a revenge on the Rimbaldians who had savagely criticized their recent staging of A Season in Hell and that it had been published without their knowledge. According to Breton and Benjamin Péret, under the seal of secrecy, but hoping to make the text known in the underground literary circles, Bataille had entrusted the poem to Maurice Billot, a bookseller and a close friend of Maurice Nadeau, Pascal Pia and Maurice Saillet; Billot, in turn, gave the poem to Saillet, demanding utmost discretion. Nevertheless, Saillet handed it to Pascal Pia and very soon they offered the text to Mercure de France; Saillet prepared the poem for printing, and Pia authored a long introduction; the book was published in a limited print run of 60 copies. After Breton's pamphlet, the text was republished as a Rimbaldian pastiche, but the press had turned the affair into a huge international scandal, out of which Nadeau never recovered, and "whose repercussions are hard to imagine today".

However, on 5 December 2012, a reissue of the poem by Bataille and Viala was published by Léo Scheer under the name of "Arthur Rimbaud" followed by a 400-page postface by Jean-Jacques Lefrère, which concludes that there may be "no definite facts to assert that the text is or is not a work of Rimbaud".

== English translation ==
In February 2025 the publisher Inpatient Press issued an English edition of the 1949 text, translated by Emine Ersoy, under its translation imprint Mercurial Editions and distributed by the MIT Press. The 112-page paperback reprints Pia's original introduction and adds an afterword by Ersoy; the publisher describes it as the first publication of the work in English, issued "with a facsimile letterpress edition of the original". Its editor, Mitch Anzuoni, has said that he first came across the poem "as a footnote in a rather dry article about literary pastiche", and marked the publication with an essay in The MIT Press Reader that its editors presented as "less a historical account than an initiation into the enduring myth of Arthur Rimbaud's lost masterwork".
