= Craig MacDonald =

Craig MacDonald may refer to:

- Craig MacDonald (ice hockey, born 1977), Canadian ice hockey left winger
- Craig MacDonald (runner), winner of the 1972 distance medley relay at the NCAA Division I Indoor Track and Field Championships
- Craig MacDonald, singer with The MacDonald Brothers

== See also ==
- Craig McDonald, American journalist and author
