= Craig McDonald =

American journalist

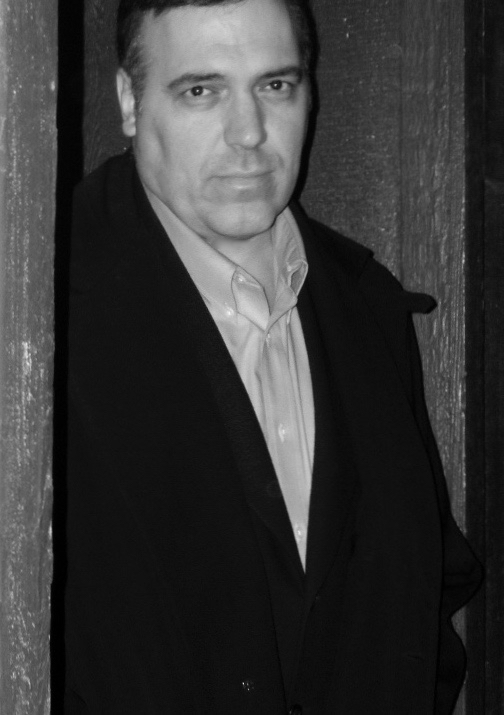
- Craig McDonald, German Village
- Born: Craig Mason McDonald; Columbus, Ohio, U.S.
- Occupations: Novelist and Journalist
- Writing career
- Genres: Crime fiction, historical literary fiction, non-fiction
- Website: www.craigmcdonaldbooks.com

Craig McDonald is an American novelist, journalist, communications specialist, and the author of the Hector Lassiter series, the Zana O'Savin Series, the novel El Gavilan, and two collections of interviews with fiction writers, Art in the Blood (2006) and Rogue Males (2009). He also edited the anthology, Borderland Noir (2015).

Born in Columbus, Ohio, he grew up in Grove City, Ohio, a fictionalized version of which serves as the setting for his 2011 work of fiction, El Gavilan.

McDonald's debut novel, Head Games (2007), was a finalist for the Edgar Award, the Anthony Award and the Gumshoe Award in the U.S. for best first novel, as well as the 2011 Sélection du prix polar Saint-Maur en Poche in France.

== Writing ==
In 2006, Craig McDonald published a collection of interviews with crime and thriller writers, Art In the Blood, featuring Q&A-style conversations with genre novelists discussing the craft of writing. A sequel interview collection, Rogue Males, followed in 2009, from Bleak House Books. That collection was a finalist for a Macavity Award for nonfiction.

In 2007, McDonald published his debut novel, Head Games. The novel received American and European awards attention, including Edgar Award and Anthony Award nominations for Best First Novel by an American Author in 2008. Head Games features fictional novelist/screenwriter Hector Lassiter, a character McDonald introduced in a 2005 short story (The Last Interview) that was selected for an online Mississippi Review anthology of “High Pulp.” The novel launched a series of further books featuring the Lassiter character.

The Lassiter novels have been translated into German, Italian, French, Spanish, Japanese, Russian, Mongolian and Korean, among other languages.

A graphic novel adaptation of Head Games scripted by McDonald was published by First Second Books.

=== Writing style/major themes ===
McDonald's Lassiter series uses historical crimes and personages, including several appearances by Ernest Hemingway and Orson Welles.

The voice and style of the Lassiter novels have drawn comparisons to James Crumley and James Ellroy, both of whom McDonald interviewed as a journalist and whom he has confirmed in interviews and essays as significant influences. McDonald's works have also been compared to those of James Carlos Blake and Jack Kerouac, among others.

In 2010, crime fiction critic and scholar Woody Haut described McDonald as "one of the few writers who can move comfortably within a post-Ellroy framework of crime fiction."

In her study, The Noir Thriller (Palgrave Macmillan, 2009), in a chapter examining "Literary Noir in the Twenty-First Century," Lee Horsley identified McDonald as one of several "neo-noir" authors who embody "a recurrent motif of men in pursuit of a lost, treacherously illusive notion of masculinity …"

Picking up a similar theme, Woody Haut, critiquing McDonald's second-published novel, Toros & Torsos, commented, "(McDonald) critiques the effect of masculine values on the culture, and examines the relationship between reality and fiction." Hector Lassiter, known to readers and critics as the man who writes what he lives and lives what he writes, eventually comes to use himself as a character in his own novels as the series unfolds.

== Works ==
=== The Hector Lassiter series ===
1. One True Sentence (Minotaur 2011; Betimes Books 2014)
2. Forever's Just Pretend (Betimes Books 2014)
3. Toros & Torsos (Bleak House 2008; Betimes Books 2014)
4. The Great Pretender (Betimes Books 2014)
5. Roll the Credits (Betimes Books 2014)
6. The Running Kind (Betimes Books 2014)
7. Head Games (Bleak House 2007; Betimes Books 2015)
8. Print the Legend (Minotaur 2010; Betimes Books 2015)
9. Death In the Face (Betimes Books 2015)
10. Three Chords & The Truth (Betimes Books 2016)
11. Write From Wrong (Betimes Books 2021)

=== Other Hector Lassiter books ===
- Head Games: The Graphic Novel (First Second Books 2017)
- Once A World (Down & Out Books, 2019)

=== The Zana O'Savin series ===
- The Blood Ogre (Night Town Books 2022)
- The Mothman Menace (Night Town Books 2023)
- The Death Killers (Night Town Books 2024)
- The Night Shepherd (Night Town Books 2025)
- The Invisible Crusade (Night Town Books 2026)

=== The Chris Lyon series ===
1. Parts Unknown (Night Town Books 2012)
2. Carnival Noir (Night Town Books 2013)
3. Cabal (Night Town Books 2013)
4. Angels of Darkness (Night Town Books 2013)
5. Daughters of Others (Close To The Bone 2026)

=== Nonfiction ===
- Art in the Blood: Crime Novelists Discuss their Craft (Point Blank 2006): A collection of interviews with a range of notable crime fiction authors. Novelists interviewed include James Ellroy, Dan Brown, Ken Bruen, Michael Connelly, Liza Cody, George Pelecanos, Walter Mosley, Dennis Lehane, Ian Rankin, Karin Slaughter, Lee Child, Steve Hamilton, J.A. Jance, Peter Lovesey, Peter Straub, Ridley Pearson, Tami Hoag, Tim Dorsey, David Corbett and Charlie Stella.
- Rogue Males: Conversations & Confrontations about the Writing Life (Bleak House 2009): A follow-up to the 2006 Art in the Blood, Rogue Males is a collection of sixteen interviews with male authors and songwriters. Rogue Males includes conversations with Elmore Leonard and James Crumley (in two of their last interviews), James Sallis, Daniel Woodrell, James Ellroy, Ken Bruen, Lee Child and Randy Wayne White. The book was a Finalist for a 2010 Macavity Award for “Best Mystery Nonfiction” category.

=== Other ===
- Borderland Noir, Editor (Betimes Books 2015): Featured short stories and essays by a range of writers on U.S. and Mexico border tensions, including Tom Russell, Ken Bruen, James Sallis, Manuel Ramos and Martín Solares.
- El Gavilan (Tyrus Books 2011): Received a starred review from Publishers Weekly. The standalone novel is set in New Austin, Ohio—a fictionalized version of Grove City, Ohio—and deals with the impact of illegal immigration from Mexico into the United States on the smalltown Midwest. The novel also ties into the Chris Lyon series, featuring Chris' cousin, Tell.
- Immortal Gain (Betimes Books 2026)

== Nominations and awards ==
Year	Award	Work	Nominee/Winner
2008	Edgar Award for the best first novel	Head Games	Finalist
2008	Anthony Award for the best first novel	Head Games	Finalist
2008	Crimespree Award	Head Games	Finalist
2008	Gumshoe Award for the best first novel	Head Games	Finalist
2010	Macavity Award for best mystery nonfiction	Rogue Males: Conversations & Confrontations About the Writing Life	Finalist
