= It Came from Outer Space =

1953 US science fiction film directed by Jack Arnold

- Theatrical release poster by Joseph Smith
- Directed by: Jack Arnold
- Screenplay by: Harry Essex
- Story by: Ray Bradbury
- Produced by: William Alland
- Starring: Richard Carlson; Barbara Rush
- Cinematography: Clifford Stine
- Edited by: Paul Weatherwax
- Music by: Joseph Gershenson (supervision); Uncredited: Irving Gertz; Henry Mancini; Herman Stein
- Color process: Black-and-white
- Production company: Universal Pictures
- Distributed by: Universal-International
- Release date: June 5, 1953
- Running time: 80 minutes
- Country: United States
- Language: English
- Budget: $800,000
- Box office: $1.6 million (rentals)

It Came from Outer Space is a 1953 American science fiction horror film, the first in the 3D process from Universal-International. It was produced by William Alland and directed by Jack Arnold. The film stars Richard Carlson and Barbara Rush, and features Charles Drake, Joe Sawyer, and Russell Johnson. The script is based on Ray Bradbury's original film treatment "The Meteor" and not, as sometimes claimed, a published short story.

It Came from Outer Space tells the story of an amateur astronomer and his fiancée who are stargazing in the desert when a large fiery object crashes to Earth. At the crash site, he discovers a round alien spaceship just before it is completely buried by a landslide. When he tells the local sheriff and newspaper editor what he saw, he is branded a crackpot. Before long, odd things begin to happen, and the disbelief turns hostile.

== Plot ==
Author and amateur astronomer John Putnam and schoolteacher Ellen Fields watch a large meteorite crash near the small town of Sand Rock, Arizona. They awaken a neighbor, who has a helicopter, and all three fly to the crash site. Putnam climbs down into the crater and notices a partially buried round object in the crater's pit. He comes to the realization, after he sees a six-sided hatchway close, that this isn't a meteorite, but a large alien spaceship. The hatchway's noise triggers a landslide that completely buries the craft. Putnam's story is later scoffed at by Sand Rock's sheriff and the local news media.

Even Ellen Fields is unsure about what to believe, but still agrees to assist Putnam in his investigation. Over the next several days, local people disappear; a few return, but they act distant or appear somewhat dazed and not their usual selves. Convinced by these and other odd events, Sheriff Warren comes to believe Putnam's story that the meteorite is actually a crashed spaceship with alien inhabitants; he then organizes a posse to hunt down the invaders at their crash site. Putnam, however, hopes to reach a peaceful solution to the looming crisis. Alone, he enters a nearby abandoned mine, which he hopes will eventually connect to the now-buried spaceship and its alien occupants.

Putnam finally discovers the spaceship and learns from the alien leader that they crashed on Earth by accident; the aliens appear benign and only plan to stay on Earth just long enough to repair their damaged craft and then continue on their voyage. The aliens' real appearance, when finally revealed to Putnam, is entirely non-human: they are large, single-eyed, almost jellyfish-like beings that seem to glide across the ground, leaving a glistening trail that soon vanishes. They are also able to shape shift into human form in order to appear human and move around Sand Rock, unobserved, in order to collect their much-needed repair materials. To do this, they copy the human forms of the local townspeople that they have abducted. In doing so, however, they fail to reproduce the townspeople's exact personalities, leading to suspicion and eventually to the deaths of two of the aliens.

Now that they have been discovered, the aliens have decided to destroy themselves and their spaceship. Putnam reasons with them at length and persuades the alien leader to instead finish the repairs while he, as a sign of the aliens' good faith, takes the captives outside to the sheriff. To protect the aliens from the sheriff and his advancing posse, Putnam manages to seal off the mine in order to give them the time they need to finish their spaceship repairs.

Shortly afterwards the alien spaceship finally leaves Earth. Putnam's fiancée Ellen asks him if they are gone for good. He responds "No, just for now. It wasn't the right time for us to meet. But there will be other nights, other stars for us to watch. They'll be back."

== Cast ==
Trailer

- Richard Carlson as John Putnam
- Barbara Rush as Ellen Fields
- Charles Drake as Sheriff Matt Warren
- Joe Sawyer as Frank Daylon
- Russell Johnson as George
- Kathleen Hughes as Jane, George's girl
- Alan Dexter as Dave Loring
- Dave Willock as Pete Davis, the pilot
- Robert Carson as Reporter Dugan
- George Eldredge as Dr. Snell
- Brad Jackson as Bob, Dr. Snell's assistant
- Warren MacGregor as Toby
- George Selk as Tom
- Edgar Dearing as Sam
- William Pullen as Deputy Reed
- Virginia Mullen as Mrs. Daylon
- Dick Pinner as Lober
- Whitey Haupt as Perry

== Production ==
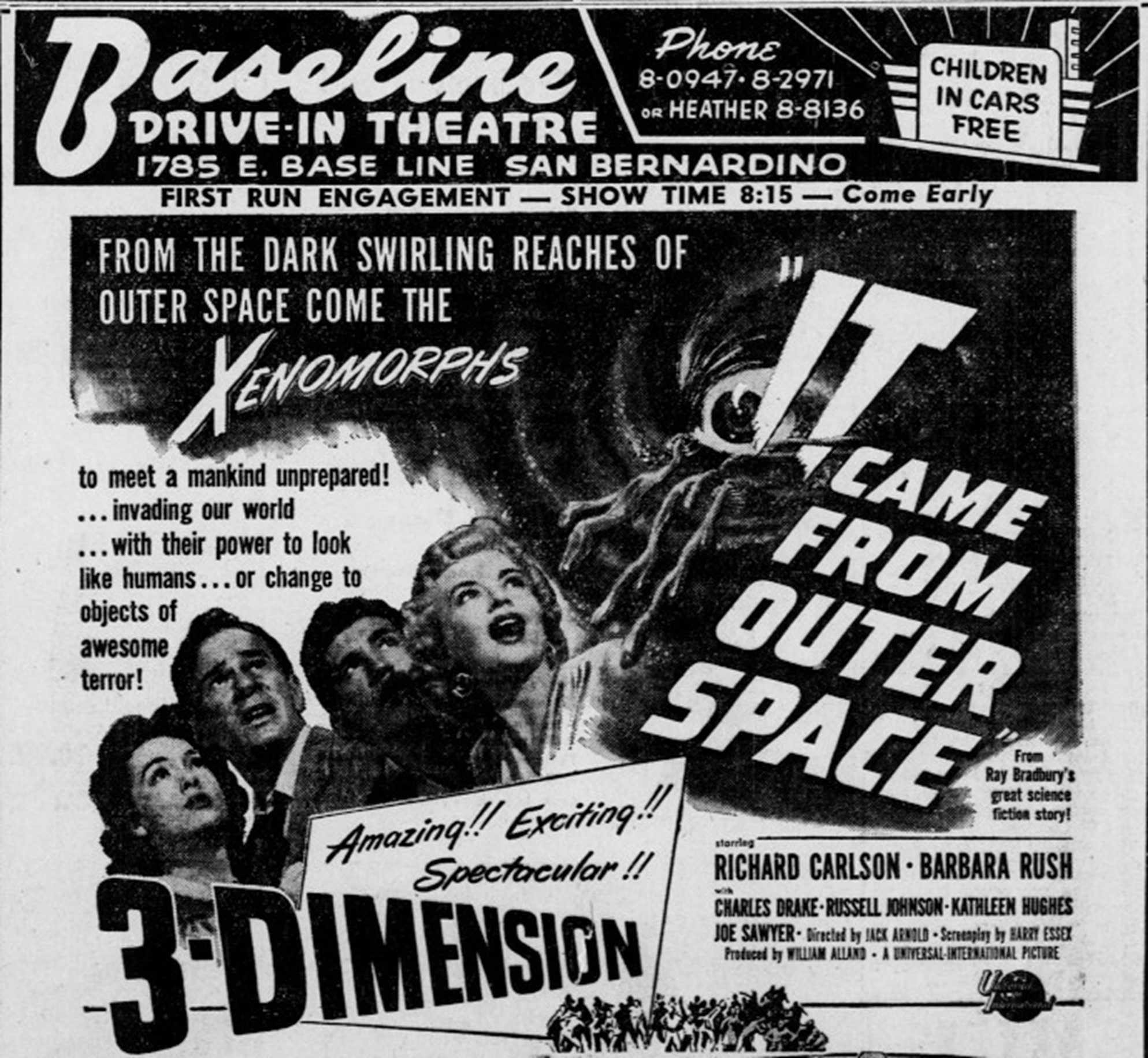
Drive-in advertisement from 1953.

The screenplay by Harry Essex, with input by Jack Arnold, was derived from an original and lengthy screen treatment by Ray Bradbury; screen legend says that Bradbury wrote the screenplay and Harry Essex merely changed the dialogue and took the credit. Unusual among science fiction films of the era, the alien "invaders" were portrayed by Bradbury as creatures stranded on Earth and without malicious intent toward humanity. Bradbury said "I wanted to treat the invaders as beings who were not dangerous, and that was very unusual." He offered two story outlines to the studio, one with malicious aliens, the other with benign aliens. "The studio picked the right concept, and I stayed on." In 2004 Bradbury published in one volume all four versions of his screen treatment for It Came From Outer Space.

Filming took place on location in and around the California towns of Palmdale, Victorville, and the Mojave Desert, as well as on Universal's sound stages.

The film's uncredited music score was composed by Irving Gertz, Henry Mancini, and Herman Stein.

Universal's make-up department submitted two alien designs to studio executives for consideration; the rejected design was saved and later used as the "Metaluna Mutant" in Universal's 1955 science fiction film This Island Earth.

The fiery special effects created for the crashing alien spacecraft consisted of a wire-mounted iron ball with dorsal fin, which had hollowed out "windows" all around for the burning magnesium inside.

The Arizona setting and the alien abduction of a telephone lineman and two other characters are fictionalized story elements taken from Bradbury's younger life when his father moved the family to Tucson, where he worked as a telephone lineman.

Urban legend has it that an extra in an Army staff sergeant's uniform seen at the "meteor" crash site is comedy writer-performer Morey Amsterdam. While the briefly glimpsed extra does indeed resemble Amsterdam, no hard evidence (e.g., cast call bureau records, interviews with Amsterdam) has ever confirmed this is actually he. The most recent DVD re-release of It Came from Outer Space comes with a documentary, The Universe According to Universal. It was written and directed by David J. Skal and has audio commentary by Tom Weaver, in which Weaver notes the extra's resemblance to Morey Amsterdam.

== Reception ==
It Came from Outer Space was released in June 1953; by the end of the year it had accrued US$1.6 million in distributors' U.S. and Canadian rentals, making it the year's 75th biggest earner. (Note: "Rentals" refers to the distributor/studio's share of the box office gross, which, according to Gebert, is roughly half of the money generated by ticket sales.)

Barbara Rush won the Golden Globe award in 1954 as most promising female newcomer for her role in the film.

The film was nominated for AFI's Top 10 Science Fiction Films list.

=== Reviews ===
Film reviewer William Brogdon in Variety wrote that "Direction by Jack Arnold whips up an air of suspense in putting the Harry Essex screenplay on film, and there is considerable atmosphere of reality created, which stands up well enough if the logic of it all is not examined too closely ... [the] story proves to be good science-fiction for the legion of film fans who like scare entertainment well done". On the other hand, The New York Times review by A. H. Weiler noted "the adventure ... is merely mildly diverting, not stupendous. The space ship and its improbable crew, which keep the citizens of Sand Rock, Ariz., befuddled and terrified, should have the same effect on customers who are passionately devoted to king-sized flying saucers and gremlins".

Since its original release, the critical response to It Came from Outer Space has evolved, becoming mostly positive. Critic and genre historian Bill Warren has written that "Arnold's vigorous direction and Bradbury's intriguing ideas meld to produce a genuine classic in its limited field". Jonathan Rosenbaum described the film as "[A] scary black-and-white SF effort from 1953". Phil Hardy's The Aurum Film Encyclopedia, Volume 2: Science Fiction observed "Dark desert roads and sudden moments of fear underline Arnold's ability as a director of Science Fiction films, and Essex's/Bradbury's lines match his images superbly". Of the 31 reviews included on Rotten Tomatoes regarding It Came from Outer Space, 81% of critics liked the film. One of the negative reviews, from FilmCritic.com, states that the film "moves terribly slowly (despite an 80 minute running time) because the plot is overly simplistic with absolutely no surprises".

== Home media ==
Universal Studios digitally restored It Came From Outer Space, and in October 2016 released it on Blu-ray. The film is presented in its original 3D with three-track stereophonic sound. Also included is a non-3D "flat" version in mono sound and the 3D and flat theatrical release trailers. Rounding out the Blu-ray package is a documentary on Universal's 3D films and a "making of" voice-over commentary track.

== Sequel ==
A made-for-TV sequel titled It Came from Outer Space II was released in 1996, starring Brian Kerwin, Elizabeth Peña, Jonathan Carrasco, Adrian Sparks, Bill McKinney, Dean Norris, Lauren Tewes, Mickey Jones and Howard Morris. Written by Jim and Ken Wheat, it was directed by Roger Duchowny, and was his final work before retiring. The story is essentially a remake of the first film, with former small town resident Jack Putnam (Kerwin) returning and witnessing an alien craft landing. Strange things then begin to happen, with his neighbors behaving oddly and the power going off and on.

Writing for Radio Times, Alan Jones gave the film one star out of five and called it a "lacklustre update" which was "proof positive that 40 years of technical advances can't compensate for poor production values, boring characters and a complete lack of thrills." He summarized: "File this under 'don't bother'." Leonard Maltin called the original "intriguing" and "remarkably sober for its era, with crisp performances and real restraint, even in its use of 3-D" and the 1996 effort "a much inferior remake, rather than the sequel the title suggests". In the New York Daily News, David Bianculli wrote that "the fact that this is a remake not a sequel, yet carries the suffix II anyway, is a clue about how clearly the makers of this new version were thinking when they made it. In other words, not very."

== In popular culture ==
- It Came from Outer Space is one of the classic films mentioned in the opening theme ("Science Fiction/Double Feature") of the 1973 musical The Rocky Horror Show and its 1975 film adaptation.
- It is also referenced in the film Night of the Comet (1984).
- The 2006 short film, No Time for Nuts briefly uses music from the film.
- The narration in the Siouxsie and the Banshees song "92 Degrees" from the 1986 album Tinderbox contains dialog from the film.
- In Metal Gear Solid 3, Para-Medic mentions the film in one of her conversations with Naked Snake when the player saves the game.
- The title for the SpongeBob SquarePants episode "It Came from Goo Lagoon" is a reference to the movie.

== See also ==
- 1953 in film
- List of 3D films pre-2005
- List of science fiction films of the 1950s
