= Bleak House Books =

Former American publishing company

Bleak House Books was an imprint of Big Earth Publishing. Before being acquired by Big Earth in 2005, Bleak House began as an independent publisher, releasing its first book in 2001. Bleak House was a publisher of hardboiled/noir books with real type protagonists, focusing more upon the people in the novels and the way they live in the world.

Bleak House Books also kept a blog and produced podcasts in which various authors and other members of the publishing community were interviewed.

Apart from publishing the majority of its books simultaneously, available upon publication date in both hardcover and paperback, Bleak House Books also released limited collector's edition options called the "Evidence Collection" which included:

- a police booking sheet complete with the author’s vital information
- signature
- fingerprint
- date
- colored endsheet
- number (1-100)

== Prizes and awards ==
2008 Edgar Award Nominees

Best Novel: Soul Patch by Reed Farrel Coleman

Best First Novel by an American Author:Head Games by Craig McDonald

Best Short Story: "Blue Note" from Chicago Blues by Stuart Kaminsky

== Recent Press ==
Bleak House Scores With Edgars, Publishers Weekly

"To nobody's surprise, when the Mystery Writers of America announced the finalists for the 2008 Edgar Awards last week titles from the large New York houses dominated the eight (out of a total of 13) categories dealing with books. But one small Wisconsin press is more than holding its own among the 35 books and five short stories selected as this year's Edgar Awards nominees. Three of the 15 titles released this past year by Bleak House Books in Madison, an imprint of Big Earth Books, have been nominated for 2008 Edgar Awards in three different categories: Soul Patch by Reed Farrel Coleman (Best Novel), Head Games by Craig McDonald (Best First Novel), and "Blue Note" by Stuart M. Kaminsky from the Chicago Blues collection (Best Short Story)..."
