= Death Is a Lonely Business =

1985 novel by Ray Bradbury

- First edition cover
- Author: Ray Bradbury
- Cover artist: Fred Marcellino
- Language: English
- Genre: Mystery
- Publisher: Alfred A. Knopf
- Publication date: October 1985
- Publication place: United States
- Media type: Print (Hardback & Paperback)
- Pages: 278pp
- ISBN: 0-394-54702-0 (first edition, hardback)
- OCLC: 12189137
- Dewey Decimal: 813/.54 19
- LC Class: PS3503.R167 D3 1985
- Preceded by: The Halloween Tree
- Followed by: A Graveyard for Lunatics

Death Is a Lonely Business is a mystery novel by American writer Ray Bradbury, published in 1985. The story, set in 1949, is about a series of murders that happen in Venice, California, then a declining seaside community in Los Angeles where Bradbury lived from 1942 to 1950. The main character and narrator (who never mentions his name) is a sensitive, modest writer, with a girlfriend studying in Mexico City. In the course of the story he meets Elmo Crumley, a detective who helps him solve the mystery behind all the semi-murders occurring among a series of eccentric characters in the forgotten town.

The book evokes both the milieu and style of other mystery writers Raymond Chandler, Dashiell Hammett, James M. Cain, and Ross Macdonald, all of whom Bradbury names in the book's dedication, and James Crumley, after whom Bradbury named his detective. The main character is based on Bradbury himself from a period of his life just before his marriage and his success with The Martian Chronicles.

Two sequels followed: A Graveyard for Lunatics (1990), and Let's All Kill Constance (2003), advancing the writer's career to 1954 and 1960, respectively.
