= Martín Solares =

Mexican writer, critic and editor (born 1970)

- Born: August 29, 1970 (age 55); Tampico, Tamaulipas
- Occupations: Writer, critic and editor
- Writing career
- Notable works: El planeta Cloralex (1998); The Black Minutes (Los minutos negros, 2006)
- Notable awards: Efraín Huerta National Literary Award (Premio Nacional de Literatura "Efraín Huerta", Mexico, 1998)

Martín Solares (born Martin Mauricio Solares Heredia in 1970) is a Mexican writer, critic and editor who received the Efraín Huerta National Literary Award in 1998 for his short story, "El planeta Cloralex". The 2008 Pulitzer Prize for Fiction laureate, Junot Díaz, praises his work as "brilliant, but mostly unavailable in English".

According to an article Solares wrote for La Jornada, during his teenage years he briefly had Rafael Guillén Vicente (Subcomandante Marcos, according to the Mexican authorities) as a substitute history teacher. He went on to work as an editor for several publishing houses and by the late 2000s he was completing a doctorate in Iberian and Latin American Studies at the University of Paris I.

== The Black Minutes ==
The Black Minutes is a crime fiction novel written by Martín Solares. The novel details the stories of two cops, in a fictional Mexican town, who are discovered to have a closed a case which involved the shooting of many schoolgirls. It is revealed that the case was closed due to the perpetrator’s affluent family’s ability to pay the cops off. The story opens by learning about the death of a young journalist who was writing a novel about the 1970s murder cases in town. A local police officer, Cabrera, soon follows after the same trail which murdered the journalist. Along with this narrative, the reader is also given the flashback narrative of detective Vincent Rangel as he investigates the original murder of the young girls. Throughout the book, the reader is introduced to one corrupt character after another, from cops who take payments to stay quiet to the alcoholic priest, whose knowledge of the truth is deteriorating his very soul. At the end, the reader is left knowing that he or she hasn’t been given the full truth. Although technically the murders have been solved, it becomes obvious that this isn’t such a happy ending after all.

Solares' first novel, The Black Minutes (Spanish: Los minutos negros) is a crime fiction thriller that, according to José Agustín, awakens memories of Rafael Bernal's El complot mongol while a book review published at The New York Times by Larry Rohter found it reminiscent of Roberto Bolaño's 2666 or Paco Ignacio Taibo II's detective stories; claiming that "he employs some flourishes that would seem to situate him in the postmodernist camp, including the occasional surrealistic episodes and his habit of mixing real and fictional characters."

In an interview with The Times, Junot Díaz expressed that The Black Minutes "is Latin American fiction at its pulpy phantasmagorical finest, [..] a literary masterpiece masquerading as a police procedural and nothing else I’ve read this year comes close. Solares does for Latin American literature what Eduardo Lago did for Iberian literature with his monumental novel Llámame Brooklyn."

The novel was shortlisted for the Rómulo Gallegos International Novel Prize and has been published in Spanish, English, German and Polish.

== The Black Minutes and Film Noir ==
With the styles of hard-boiled detectives, The Black Minutes is laden with notions of film noir. It has all the classic points that make noirs what they- an opening of a murder, a detective who follows the trail, flashbacks, etc. However, by setting this is a fictional Mexican town, the two detectives must deal with corruption around every corner- men serving time for crimes they have not committed (how René Luz de Dios Lopez was framed for the murder of the young girls as “The Jackal”) and members of the cartel truly running the show (how Cabrera was nervous when he realized he confiscated a pistol from the cartel boss’s son). The narrative, in particular, is a quintessential part of the noir film, as it plays up on logic and switches in the readers focus. The best way, a way Solares uses, is by implementing flashbacks. By using flashbacks for both Cabrera and Rangel, the reader is able to follow the opposing logics and begin developing his or her own prediction for the end.

== Notable works ==
- El planeta Cloralex, 1998 (Cloralex Planet)
- Los minutos negros, 2006 (The Black Minutes, 2010)
- Cómo dibujar una novela, 2014 (How to Draw a Novel)
- No manden flores, 2015 (Don't Send Flowers, 2018)
- Catorce colmillos, 2018 (Fourteen Fangs)
- Muerte en el jardín de la luna, 2020 (Death in the Moon Garden)
