= A Graveyard for Lunatics =

1990 novel by Ray Bradbury

A Graveyard for Lunatics : Another tale of two cities.
- First edition cover
- Author: Ray Bradbury
- Cover artist: Wendell Minor
- Language: English
- Genre: Mystery
- Published: 1990 (Alfred A. Knopf)
- Publication place: United States
- Media type: Print (Hardback & Paperback)
- Pages: 285 pp
- ISBN: 0-394-57877-5 (first edition, hardback)
- OCLC: 21117115
- Dewey Decimal: 813/.54 20
- LC Class: PS3503.R167 G74 1990
- Preceded by: Death Is a Lonely Business
- Followed by: Let's All Kill Constance

A Graveyard for Lunatics: Another tale of two cities is a mystery novel by American writer Ray Bradbury, published in 1990. It is the second in a series of three mystery novels that Bradbury wrote featuring a fictionalized version of the author himself as the unnamed narrator.

The novel is set in 1954, when the narrator is a writer working at a Hollywood motion picture studio. The setting and themes of the novel are inspired by Bradbury's experiences working on several films, including It Came from Outer Space, King of Kings, and Something Wicked This Way Comes. The studio shares a back wall with an adjoining cemetery (as Paramount Studios really does with Hollywood Forever Cemetery), and most of the story takes place in those two locations.

Two of the novel's characters, stop motion animator Roy Holdstrom and autocratic director Fritz Wong, were based on Bradbury's friends Ray Harryhausen and Fritz Lang + James Wong Howe. Another character, the shy, blond-haired autograph collector Clarence, may be an alternate autobiographical portrait of Bradbury, who as a teenager waited outside Hollywood studios for glimpses of movie stars.

It was preceded by the novel Death Is a Lonely Business, set in 1949, and followed by Let's All Kill Constance, set in 1960.
