= Ignacio Bernal =

Mexican anthropologist and archaeologist (1910–1992)

Ignacio Bernal (February 13, 1910 in Paris - January 24, 1992 in Mexico City) was an eminent Mexican anthropologist and archaeologist.

Bernal excavated much of Monte Albán, originally starting as a student of Alfonso Caso, and later led major archeological projects at Teotihuacan. In 1965 he excavated Dainzú. He was the director of Mexico's National Museum of Anthropology 1962-68 and again 1970–77. In 1965, he was elected a Foreign Honorary Member of the American Academy of Arts and Sciences. Bernal was awarded the Premio Nacional in 1969. He was a founding member of the Third World Academy of Sciences in 1983.

== Biography ==
Bernal was the son of Rafael and Rafaela (Garcia Pimentel) Bernal. He married Sofia Verea on October 14, 1944, and had four children: Ignacio, Rafaela, Carlos, and Concepcion. He received his M.A. from the Escuela Nacional de Antropologia, Mexico in 1946 and his Ph.D. from the Universidad Nacional Autonoma de Mexico in 1949. His younger brother was the novelist Rafael Bernal.

== Books ==
Bernal's many publications include:

- Ancient Mexico in Colour (1979)
- A History of Mexican Archaeology: the Vanished Civilizations of Middle America (1980). London, Thames and Hudson. ISBN 0-500-78008-0
- Mexico Before Cortez: Art, History, Legend (1963)
- The Mexican National Museum of Anthropology, Mexico (1968)
- The Olmec World. Berkeley, University of California Press. (1969)

and

- Paddock, J., & Bernal, I. (1966). Ancient Oaxaca; Discoveries in Mexican Archeology and History. Stanford, Calif, Stanford University Press.

== Awards ==
- H.H.D., University of Americas
- L.H.D. (Doctor of Humane Letters), University of California, Berkeley
- LL.D. (Doctor of Laws), St. Mary's University
- National Science Award, Mexico
