= It Came from Outer Space (book) =

Book by Ray Bradbury

It Came From Outer Space was a 2003 publication of four versions of Ray Bradbury's screen treatments written in 1952 for the 1953 film of the same name. The book also featured essays, studio letters, posters, ads and reviews. The treatments range from a 37-page outline to a 119-page story. Bradbury did not write the final screenplay.

Bradbury's previously unpublished short story "A Matter of Taste" was the inspiration for his treatments, and was included in this edition. The collection was edited by Donn Albright, who also edited Gauntlet Press's limited-edition 2005 version of Bradbury's 1972 novel The Halloween Tree.
