= Let's All Kill Constance =

2002 novel by Ray Bradbury

- Dust-jacket from the first edition
- Author: Ray Bradbury
- Cover artist: José Luis Merino
- Language: English
- Genre: Detective/mystery
- Publisher: William Morrow and Company
- Publication date: December 2002
- Publication place: United States
- Media type: Print (Hardback and Paperback)
- Pages: 210 pp
- ISBN: 0-06-051584-8
- OCLC: 50079903
- Dewey Decimal: 813/.54 21
- LC Class: PS3503.R167 L47 2003
- Preceded by: A Graveyard for Lunatics

Let's All Kill Constance is a mystery novel by American writer Ray Bradbury, published in 2002. Narrated by an unnamed Los Angeles writer and set in 1960, it chronicles an unexpected visit from aging Hollywood actress Constance Rattigan, who gives him two death lists of once-famous people with Constance's name on one of them, and the gradual unraveling of the mystery by the narrator with the help of private investigator Elmo Crumley.

The narrator visits the listed people in order, all of whom die under mysterious circumstances shortly thereafter. Suspiciously, each of them claims to have met Constance, who always flees one step ahead of the narrator. Is Constance the true murderer, or is someone seeking to sever all ties to her associates before finally killing her?

Let's All Kill Constance is a sequel to Bradbury's Death Is a Lonely Business (1985) and A Graveyard for Lunatics (1990).

The novel references Ray Bradbury's better-known work, Fahrenheit 451, in chapter 16. In it, the protagonist muses on the possibility of people using books to start fires in the future.

Cover of a paperback reprint.
