= Xōchipilli =

Aztec deity

Xochipilli
- Beauty; youth; love; sexuality; fertility; arts; flowers
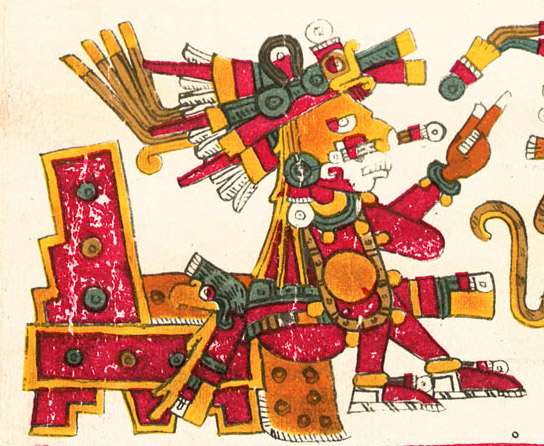
- Xochipilli as depicted in the Borgia Codex
- Other names: Macuilxōchitl, Chicōmexōchitl
- Abode: Tamoanchan (Codex Ríos)
- Gender: Male
- Region: Mesoamerica
- Ethnic group: Aztec, Tlaxcaltec, Toltec (Nahua)
- Festivals: Tlaxochimaco, Miccailhuitontli

Genealogy
- Parents: Xōchitlīcuē (Codex Ramírez)
- Siblings: Xōchiquetzal
- Consort: None

Xōchipilli (Classical Nahuatl pronunciation: [ʃoːt͡ʃiˈpilːi]) is the god of beauty, youth, love, passion, sex, sexuality, fertility, arts, song, music, dance, painting, writing, games, playfulness, nature, vegetation and flowers in Aztec mythology. His name contains the Nahuatl words xōchitl ('flower') and pilli (either 'prince' or 'child') and hence means 'flower prince'.

== Associations ==
As the patron of writing and painting, he was called Chicomexōchitl ('Seven-flower'), but he could also be referred to as Macuilxōchitl ('Five-flower'). He was the patron of the game patolli. He is frequently paired with Xōchiquetzal, who is seen as his female counterpart. Xōchipilli has also been interpreted as the patron of both psychedelie and nature, a role possibly resulting from his being absorbed from the Toltec civilization.

He, among other gods, is depicted wearing a talisman known as an oyohualli, which was a teardrop-shaped pendant crafted out of mother-of-pearl.

== Statue ==
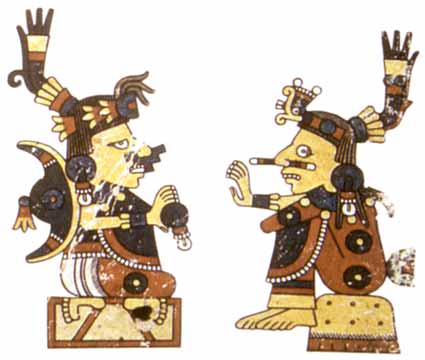
Xōchiquetzal, left, and Xōchipilli. Codex Fejérváry-Mayer

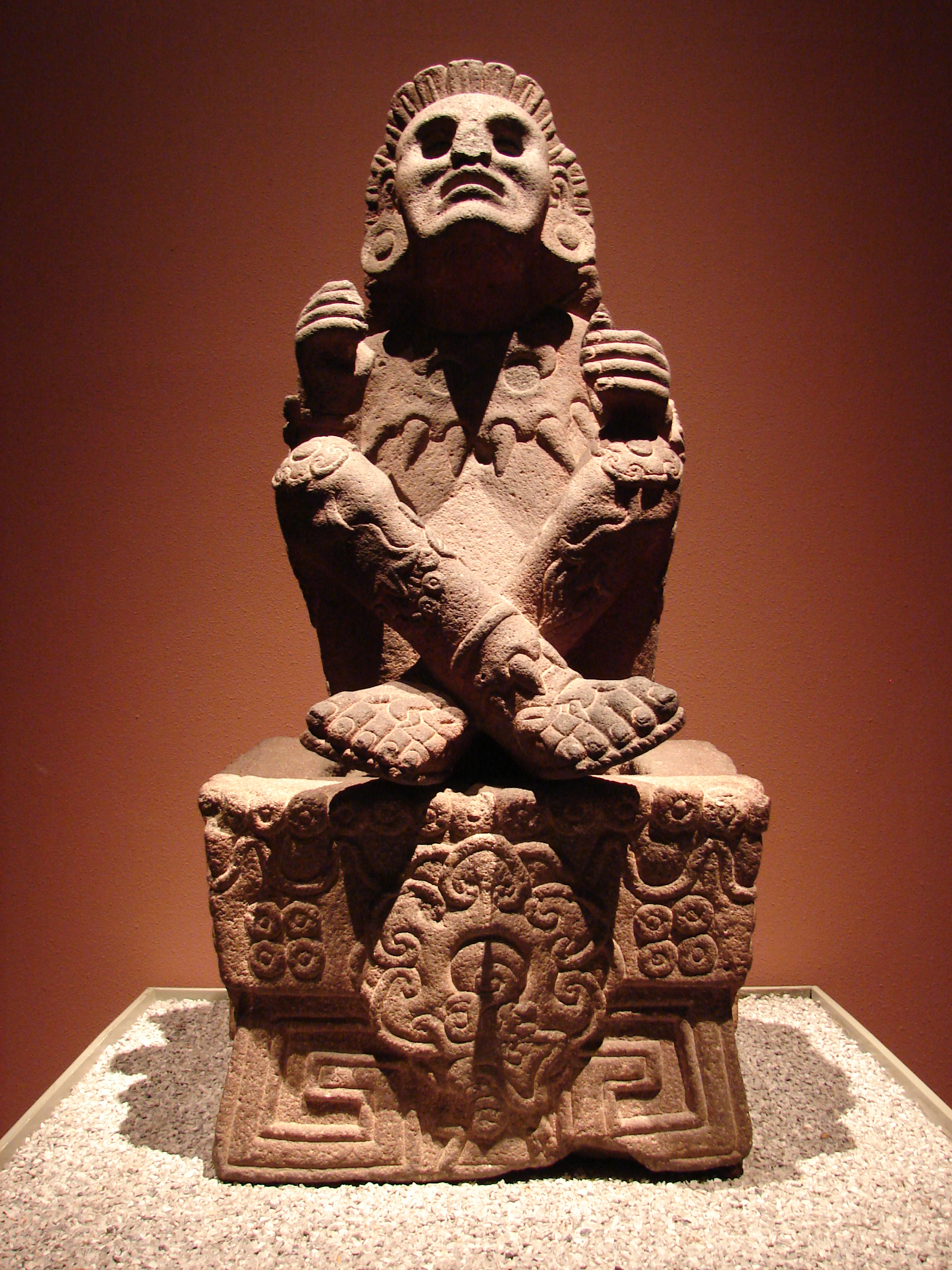
Statue of Xōchipilli (National Museum of Anthropology, Mexico City)

In the mid-19th century, a 16th-century Aztec statue of Xōchipilli was unearthed on the side of the volcano Popocatépetl near Tlalmanalco. The statue is of a single figure seated upon a temple-like base. Both the statue and the base upon which it sits are covered in carvings of sacred and psychoactive organisms including mushrooms (Psilocybe aztecorum), tobacco (Nicotiana tabacum), ololiúqui (Turbina corymbosa), sinicuichi (Heimia salicifolia), possibly cacahuaxochitl (Quararibea funebris), and one unidentified flower. Laurette Séjourné has written:

The texts always use the flower in an entirely spiritual sense, and the aim of the religious colleges was to cause the flower of the body to bloom: This flower can be no other than the soul. The association of the flower with the sun is also evident. One of the hieroglyphs for the sun is a four-petalled flower, and the feasts of the ninth month, dedicated to Huitzilopochtli, were entirely given over to flower offerings.

The figure himself sits on the base, head tilted up, eyes open, jaw tensed, with his mouth half open and his arms opened to the heavens. The statue is currently housed in the Aztec hall of the Museo Nacional de Antropología in Mexico City.

=== Entheogen connection ===
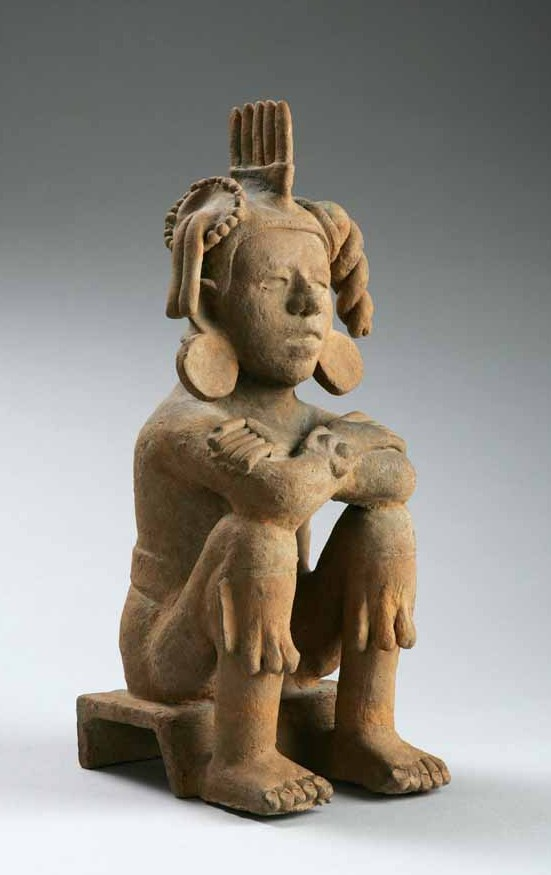
Xōchipilli, Aztec terracotta (Lombards Museum)

Robert Gordon Wasson, Richard Evans Schultes, and Albert Hofmann suggest that the statue of Xōchipilli represents a figure in the throes of entheogenic ecstasy. The position and expression of the body, in combination with the very clear representations of hallucinogenic plants which are known to have been used in sacred contexts by the Aztec support this interpretation. The statue appears to have hugely dilated pupils, suggesting an effect of hallucinogenic mushrooms.

Wasson says that in the statue's depiction Xōchipilli "is absorbed by temicxoch, 'dream flowers', as the Nahua say describing the awesome experience that follows the ingestion of an entheogen. I can think of nothing like it in the long and rich history of European art: Xōchipilli absorbed in temicxoch".

== See also ==
- Quiabelagayo
