= Marios Chakkas =

Greek writer

- Born: 1931; Makrakomi, Greece
- Died: 5 July 1972 (aged 40–41)
- Occupation: Writer
- Notable work: "Beautiful Summer," "The Rifleman of the Enemy," "The Bidet and Other Stories," and more

Marios Chakkas (Greek: Μάριος Χάκκας; Makrakomi, 1931 – 5 July 1972) was a Greek writer. He was persecuted due to his political beliefs, especially during the Greek junta.

== Biography ==
Born in Makrakomi in 1931, he moved with his family to Kaisariani at age 4, where spent his childhood and his youth, and with which he was sentimentally connected, something which is apparent in his work. Aged 19, and while he was studying in the Samaritan (nursing) School of the Hellenic Red Cross, he voluntarily helped the prisoners in Gyaros. On 30 April 1954 he was arrested and sentenced to four years in jail, having to stop his studies in the Panteion University.

During the 60s he published his first poetic collection titled "Beautiful summer" (it was also the only one published while he was alive). After the 1967 coup and the establishment of the junta, he was persecuted and jailed for one month for being a member of EDA (1960 – 67). During the last years of his life he wrote three theatrical solo acts.

He died from cancer aged 41, during the junta.

== Important works ==
- "Beautiful summer" (1965)
- "The Rifleman of the enemy" (1966)
- "The Bidet and other stories" (1971)
- "Guilt" (theatrical solo act)
- "Pursuit" (theatrical solo act)
- "Keys" (theatrical solo act)
- "The commune" (1972)
