= Olivia Tapiero =

Canadian writer

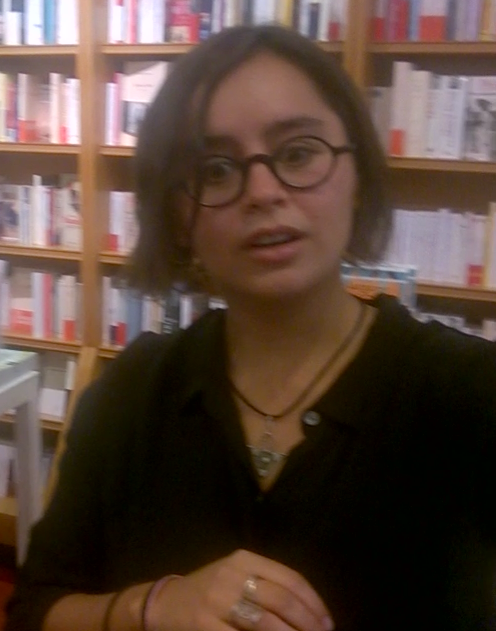
- Born: March 11, 1990 (age 36); Montreal, Quebec, Canada
- Occupations: novelist, translator
- Writing career
- Period: 2000s-present
- Notable works: Les Murs, Rien du tout

Olivia Tapiero (born March 11, 1990) is a Canadian writer from Montreal, Quebec. She is most noted for her novels Les Murs, which won the Prix Robert-Cliche in 2009, and Rien du tout, which was shortlisted for the Governor General's Award for French-language fiction at the 2021 Governor General's Awards.
