= Pascal Pia =

French author, journalist and illustrator (1903–1979)

- Born: Pierre Durand; 15 August 1903; Paris, France
- Died: 27 September 1979 (aged 76); Paris, France
- Other names: Pascal Rose; Pascal Fely; Pontault
- Occupations: Writer, journalist, illustrator and scholar

Pascal Pia (15 August 1903, Paris – 27 September 1979, Paris), born Pierre Durand, was a French writer, journalist, illustrator and scholar. He also used the pseudonyms Pascal Rose, Pascal Fely and others.

== Early life ==
After the death of his father in 1915 during World War I, Pia's mother had to work by herself. Pia decided to move away at the age of 14 and begin a new life in Paris.

== Later works ==
In 1922 he published the erotic work Les Princesses de Cythère. His La Muse en rut, a collection of erotic poems, appeared in 1928. He also illustrated erotic works, such as the Songs of Bilitis. In 1938 he founded the leftist journal Alger républicain in Algiers (which was part of the French colony of Algeria at the time). The journal was forbidden in 1939. During World War II, Pia participated in the French Resistance (in the group "Combat") and in 1944 he became chief editor of the clandestine resistance journal Combat, using the pseudonym Pontault. He said "We will try to make a reasonable newspaper. And as the world is absurd, it will fail."

Albert Camus worked as a journalist at the Alger républicain and later also at Combat. Pia and Camus became friends, and Camus dedicated his 1942 essay The Myth of Sisyphus to Pia. A collection of their correspondence was published in 2000. Pascal Pia was also a good friend of André Malraux.

Pia was a member ("Satrape") of the Collège de 'pataphysique. He often expressed absurdist and nihilistic sentiments. At the end of his life, he claimed the "right to nothingness", prohibiting others from writing about him after his death.

== Selected works ==
- Les Princesses de Cythere: Chronique Libertine de l'Histoire (Jean Fort, 1922)
- La Muse en rut et autres poèmes (1928)
- Baudelaire par lui-même (1952)
- Apollinaire par lui-même (1954)
- Baudelaire (Biography translated by Patrick Gregory, Grove Press, 1961)
- Les livres de l'Enfer: bibliographie critique des ouvrages érotiques dans leurs différentes éditions du XVIe siècle à nos jours (1978) [The Books of the "Enfer:" Critical Bibliography of Erotic Works in their Different Editions from the Sixteenth Century to the Present].
- Poemes et textes retrouvés (1982)
- Correspondance avec Albert Camus (2000)
