= Rafael Bernal =

Mexican diplomat and writer (1915–1972)

Rafael Bernal (28 June 1915 – 17 September 1972) was a Mexican diplomat and novelist, best known for his crime novels, particularly The Mongolian Conspiracy. Bernal wrote a book titled México en Filipinas: estudio de una transculturación about the introduction of Mexican culture to the Philippines. His brother was the anthropologist and archaeologist Ignacio Bernal.
