= David Corbett (author) =

American author

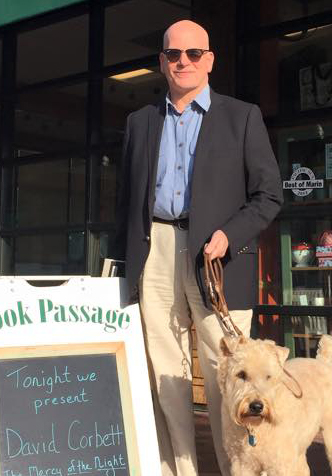
David Corbett (author) and his dog, Hamley, outside Book Passage, 2015.

David Corbett (born 1953) is an American author of seven novels, numerous stories, a novella, two writing guides, and a number of non-fiction articles.

== Early life ==
Corbett was born and raised in Columbus, Ohio, and attended Ohio State University, where he graduated cum laude with a Bachelor of Science in mathematics. A self-described “American Mutt” and “Recovering Catholic,” he traveled the Midwest in a Top 40 bar band, abandoned a fellowship in linguistics at U.C. Berkeley, and studied acting at the Jean Shelton Actors Lab before joining the San Francisco private investigation firm of Palladino & Sutherland in 1983.

Over the next thirteen years Corbett worked on numerous high-profile civil and criminal litigations, including the Lincoln Savings & Loan Fraud Case, the DeLorean Trial, the Coronado Company marijuana indictments, the Cotton Club Murder Case, the People's Temple Trial, the first Michael Jackson child molestation matter, and a RICO civil litigation brought by the Teamsters against former union leaders associated with organized crime.

== Writing career ==
Corbett's first novel, The Devil’s Redhead, appeared in 2002 from Ballantine, and he has been writing and teaching fiction ever since.

In 2003, David's novel Done for a Dime was nominated for a Macavity Award for Best Novel, and was named a New York Times Notable Book. Patrick Anderson of the Washington Post described it as “the best in contemporary crime fiction” and included it with other select thriller novels as “some of the best fiction being written today.”

In 2011, Corbett received the Spinetingler Award for Best Novel—Rising Star Category, for Do They Know I’m Running? His other novels have been nominated for the Anthony, Barry, Macavity, Edgar, Shamus, and Lefty Awards.

His short fiction has been selected twice for inclusion in Best American Mystery Stories – in 2009 for “Pretty Little Parasite” and in 2011 for a story co-written with Luis Alberto Urrea, “Who Stole My Monkey?” A collaborative novel for which he contributed a chapter—Culprits—was adapted for TV by the producers of Killing Eve for Disney+ in the U.K. and Hulu in the U.S.

In 2013, Penguin Random-House published David's The Art of Character, which received widespread praise, including being described as “a writer’s bible” by Elizabeth Brundage, being chosen as one of the 13 best writing guides of 2013 by The Writer magazine, and being recommended by Ken Burns in Lesson 9, “Shaping Nonfiction Characters," of his master class on documentary filmmaking. In 2019 David's follow-up writing guide appeared, The Compass of Character, which was also widely praised. His articles on the craft of fiction have appeared in various publications, including New York Times, Narrative, Writer’s Digest, Zyzzyva, MovieMaker, and Crimespree.

== Other activity ==
Over the years he has taught creative writing in a number of settings, both in-person and online, through such outlets as the UCLA Extension Writers’ Project, Litreactor, 826 Valencia, The Grotto in San Francisco, Book Passage, writing conferences across the U.S., Canada, and Mexico, and with the inmates at the California Men's Facility in Vacaville, California.

Corbett also contributes a monthly post to Writer Unboxed, a blog dedicated to the craft and business of fiction.

== Bibliography ==
=== Fiction ===
==== Novels ====
- The Devil’s Redhead ISBN 978-1453253403
  - Best First Novel Anthony Award nominee
  - Best First Novel Barry Award nominee
- Done for a Dime ISBN 978-1453253410
  - New York Times Notable Book of the Year
  - Best Novel Macavity Award nominee
- Blood of Paradise ISBN 978-1453289754
  - Nominated for the Macavity Award for Best Mystery Novel
  - Nominated for the Anthony for Best Paperback Original
  - Nominated for the Edgar® for Best Paperback Original
  - Chosen as one of the Top Ten Thrillers & Mysteries of 2007 by The Washington Post
  - Named a San Francisco Chronicle Notable Book of 2007
  - Named a 2008 Ohioana Book Award finalist in the Fiction category
- Do They Know I’m Running? ISBN 978-1453289730
  - Winner Best Novel, Rising Star Category Spinetingler Magazine
  - A Best Books of 2010 Crime Fiction Pick, January Magazine
  - A Staff Favorite Pick for 2010, Poisoned Pen Bookstore
  - A Biblio's Bloggins 2010 Reading List Pick
- The Mercy of the Night ISBN 978-1477849446
  - Booklist starred review
- The Long-Lost Love Letters of Doc Holliday ISBN 978-1960725073
  - Lefty Award Nomination for Best Historical Mystery
  - Named a Top Pick of 2018 by Bookreporter
- The Truth Against the World ISBN 978-1960725004
  - Editor's Choice, Reader's House
  - Finalist, Foreword Reviews Book of the Year, Thriller and Suspense category
  - Named “Favorite of the Year” by Criminal Minds
  - Named one of the Best Crime, Mystery, and Thriller Books of June 2023 by Mystery Tribune

==== Novella ====
- The Devil Prayed and Darkness Fell ASIN B0112PW50Y

==== Short Story Collection ====
- Thirteen Confessions ISBN 978-1504035941

==== Collaborations ====
- The Chopin Manuscript ISBN 978-0615213699
- The Copper Bracelet ISBN 978-1602857315
- Culprits ISBN 978-1915523631

=== Non-Fiction ===
- The Art of Character ISBN 978-0143121572
- The Compass of Character ISBN 978-1440300868
