= Something Wicked This Way Comes (novel) =

1962 dark fantasy novel by Ray Bradbury

- First edition dust jacket art by Gray Foy
- Author: Ray Bradbury
- Language: English
- Genre: Fantasy; Horror; Supernatural
- Publisher: Simon & Schuster
- Publication date: September 17, 1962
- Publication place: United States
- Media type: Print (hardcover and paperback)
- Pages: 293
- ISBN: 0-671-67960-0 (first edition); see release details for others
- OCLC: 9194864
- Preceded by: Dandelion Wine
- Followed by: The Halloween Tree

Something Wicked This Way Comes is a 1962 dark fantasy novel by Ray Bradbury, and the second book in his Green Town Trilogy. It is about two 13-year-old best friends, Jim Nightshade and William Halloway, and their nightmarish experience with a traveling carnival that comes to their Midwestern home, Green Town, Illinois, on October 24.

The novel combines elements of fantasy and horror, analyzing the conflicting natures of good and evil that exist within all individuals. Unlike many of Bradbury's other novel-length works, such as Dandelion Wine and The Martian Chronicles, which are fix-ups, Something Wicked This Way Comes is a single, full-length narrative.

The title is taken from "By the pricking of my thumbs, something wicked this way comes", a line said by the witches in Shakespeare's Macbeth.

== Background ==
One of the events in Ray Bradbury's childhood that inspired him to become a writer was an encounter with a carnival leader named Mr. Electrico who commanded him to "Live forever!" The 12-year-old Bradbury, intrigued at the concept of eternal life, revisited Mr. Electrico, who spurred his passion for life by heralding him as the reincarnation of a friend lost in World War I. After that memorable day, Bradbury began writing nonstop.

The novel originated in 1955 when Bradbury suggested to his friend Gene Kelly that they collaborate on a movie for Kelly to direct. Kelly was encouraging of the idea, and Bradbury spent the next five weeks adapting his 1948 short story "The Black Ferris" into an 80-page treatment. Kelly shopped the project to various studios, but was unable to obtain financial backing for the film. Bradbury then gradually expanded the treatment into the novel over a five-year period. He converted the benign presence of Mr. Electrico into a more sinister one and incorporated several members he met at the same carnival with Mr. Electrico, including the Illustrated Man and the Skeleton Man.

The book's autumnal setting was intended as a thematic sequel to Bradbury's summer-tinged Dandelion Wine. Both works are set in the fictitious Green Town (based on Bradbury's hometown, Waukegan, Illinois) but have different tones, with the seasons in which they are set reflecting different aspects of the transition from childhood to adulthood. While none of the characters in Dandelion Wine reappear in Something Wicked This Way Comes, Will Halloway and Jim Nightshade can be viewed as one-year older representations of Dandelion Wine's Douglas Spaulding and John Huff, respectively. These two novels, coupled with Bradbury's official 2006 sequel to Dandelion Wine, Farewell Summer, constitute what Bradbury has termed his "Green Town Trilogy". The 2008 short story collection Summer Morning, Summer Night is also set almost entirely in Green Town.

Bradbury had previously published his books through either Ballantine Books or Doubleday, but switched to Simon & Schuster for the publication of Something Wicked This Way Comes. According to Simon & Schuster editor Robert Gottlieb, Bradbury had grown frustrated with Doubleday's lack of energy behind his newer ideas.

== Plot summary ==
The novel opens on an overcast October 23. Two friends – William "Will" Halloway and Jim Nightshade – both on the verge of their 14th birthdays, encounter a strange lightning rod salesman, Tom Fury. He announces that a storm is coming their way. The salesman tells the boys that one of their houses is in danger and gives Jim a lightning rod. Throughout the night, Will and Jim meet up with townsfolk who also sense something in the air. Among the townspeople is Will's 54-year-old father, Charles Halloway, who works in the local library. Both Charles and the boys learn about the carnival that is to start the next day. Jim and Will are excited that a carnival has come so late in the year, but Charles has a bad feeling about it.

The boys run out to watch the carnival arrive at three in the morning. As the train pulls in, clouds descend and solidify as the canvas of the carnival's tents. The boys go the next day to explore the carnival and encounter their 7th grade teacher, Miss Foley, who is dazed after visiting the Mirror Maze. Jim insists on coming back that night and Will agrees, but when they bump into the lightning-rod salesman's abandoned bag, they realize that they must stay to learn what happens after dark. After investigating all of the rides, they go up to a carousel, which has an out-of-order sign. Mr. Cooger suddenly grabs Will and Jim after they climb up on horses and he informs them the merry-go-round is broken. Mr. Dark arrives and tells him to put them down. He pays attention only to Jim, who is enthralled by what he sees. The boys run away and then hide and wait. Both witness Mr. Cooger riding backwards on the carousel (as the music plays backwards), and when he steps off, to their shock, he is 12 years old.

They follow young Mr. Cooger to Miss Foley's house, where he pretends to be the nephew she was expecting. Jim, wanting to ride the carousel, tries to talk with him, but Will stops him. Jim runs off in the direction of the carnival. When Will catches up, Mr. Cooger is riding the carousel, growing older, and Jim is about to join him. Will knocks the switch on the carousel and it flies out of control, spinning rapidly forward. Mr. Cooger ages over 100 years before it stops, and Jim and Will take off. They return with the police and an ambulance crew, but Mr. Cooger is nowhere to be found. They venture inside one of the tents containing the carnival's performers, including a dwarf (who appears to be the remains of Tom Fury) and the Dust Witch, ultimately finding Mr. Cooger's decrepit body set up as a new act, "Mr. Electrico", a man they run electricity through. Mr. Dark tells the boys to come back to the carnival the next day. Will tries to keep his father out of the situation, promising him that he will tell all soon. That night, the Dust Witch floats by in her balloon to find Jim and Will. She marks Jim's roof with shiny slime, which the boys then remove with a hose. Will lures her to an abandoned house and destroys her balloon with a bow and arrow. They later both dream of a bizarre funeral for the balloon, featuring a giant, misshapen coffin.

The next day the boys find a girl crying under a tree and realize she is the former Miss Foley made young again. They leave the girl where she is, checking Miss Foley's house to confirm the theory, but when they return for her, they are cut off by a parade from the carnival. The carnival's members appear to be searching the streets for them, having already taken the young Miss Foley. The boys hide under a storm drain in front of the cigar store, where Will's father spots them. The boys persuade him to keep quiet as Mr. Dark arrives to talk to him. Charles pretends not to know the two boys, whose faces are tattooed on Mr. Dark's hands; when the Dust Witch comes and begins to sense the boys' presence, he blows cigar smoke at her, choking her and forcing her to leave. Mr. Dark then asks Charles for his name, and Will's father tells him he is the town library's janitor. That night, Will and Jim meet Charles at the library where he has done research, finding that the carnival arrives once every few decades, always in October. Mr. Dark appears, and the boys hide in the book stacks. He discovers both of them and crushes the janitor's hand when Charles attempts to fight him. The Dust Witch arrives and casts spells on the boys to mesmerize them and also tries to stop Charles's heart. Just before he is about to die, Charles looks at the Witch and begins to laugh hysterically. His laughter wounds her deeply and drives her away. He then follows Mr. Dark to the carnival to rescue the boys.

At the carnival, Mr. Dark and the Dust Witch are in the midst of performing a bullet catch illusion. Seizing the opportunity, Charles mortally wounds the Witch by carving a smile on a fake bullet, in the process calling his son out of the Mirror Maze. Running back into the maze to find Jim, Charles is nearly overcome before destroying all the mirrors with laughter. Continuing the search, Charles and Will find Mr. Cooger turned to dust and blown away, apparently while being carried back to the carousel. Entranced, Jim runs to the merry-go-round and starts riding it forward. Will tries to stop him, grabbing his hand, only to be dragged along before Jim is finally ripped away. Jim falls into a stupor, close to death. A child comes begging them to help him, but Charles recognizes the boy as Mr. Dark, turned young. Holding the boy tightly, Charles seemingly kills the boy through the power of goodness alone. The carnival falls apart as Will tries to revive Jim. Charles persuades Will to join him in singing, dancing, and laughing, and their happiness brings Jim back from the edge of death.

== Characters ==
William "Will" Halloway
Born one minute before midnight on October 30, Will is described as having done "only six years of staring". He is described as having white-blonde hair with eyes "as clear as summer rain". Will is naturally obedient and wary of getting involved in difficult situations; nonetheless, he takes on an active role in fighting the carnival's evil power.
James "Jim" Nightshade
Born one minute after midnight on October 31, Jim is brooding and brash, acting as a foil for Will's cautiousness and practicality. He is described as having wild and tangled chestnut brown hair and eyes the color of "green-glass fire". Jim yearns to become older, which makes him vulnerable to the carnival's temptations, but he is ultimately saved by his friendship with Will.
Charles Halloway
A middle-aged man who starts out in the novel as quiet and unhappy. He's not very close to his son, but eventually gains self-awareness and faith while up against the carnival (defeating the "Dust Witch" and "Jed/Mr. Dark"). He becomes a fighter in his own right by the end of the novel, along with gaining the admiration, love, and friendship of his son.
G. M. Dark
The main antagonist, he is a sinister man who bears tattoos all over his body, one for each person successfully tempted into joining the carnival. Mr. Dark initially holds sway over the other main characters, but his power weakens when Charles uses positive emotions against him, something he cannot comprehend or withstand. Dark's background is a mystery, although when asked if he reads the Bible, he replies, "I've had every page, line and word read at me, sir!" This could refer to a possible Christian upbringing, or his victims quoting.
J. C. Cooger
Dark's partner in running the carnival, Mr. Cooger, is a fierce, red-headed man who is first seen repairing the carousel. He catches and terrifies Will and Jim until Mr. Dark intervenes. In the guise of her twelve-year-old nephew, he is able to persuade Miss Foley to come to the carnival. The tables are turned on him, however, when Will increases the speed of the carousel as Mr. Cooger is riding it, causing him to rapidly age to the point of decrepitude. At the climax of the book, he crumbles into dust and dies when the freaks accidentally drop him while carrying him back to the carousel. Like Mr. Dark, his origins are unknown.
The Dust Witch
A blind soothsayer possessing a sixth sense and the ability to perform many feats of magic, the Witch is portrayed as one of the carnival's most dangerous members. However, her increased sensitivity to the presence and emotions of other people makes her vulnerable to positive feelings. Charles uses this weakness to kill her with a bullet carved with a smile. Her origins are unknown, but she is illustrated on Mr. Dark's wrist as a "black-nun blind woman".
Miss Foley
A fifty-year-old schoolteacher of Will and Jim. Much like the other victims of the carnival, Miss Foley wished to become young. Her wish is granted, although she is transformed into a little girl with all her memories intact, unable to return to her former life and with no one to take care of her. It is not stated in the novel what happened to Miss Foley at the end.
The Skeleton
An extremely thin, skeleton-like creature who is one of the more frequently appearing freaks. Like all of the other freaks, he once desired to be younger and was eventually tricked into joining the carnival. The Skeleton appears to be one of the more loyal freaks as, near the book's end, he takes the time to carry the recently deceased and young Mr. Dark with him after all the other freaks ran away. He is last seen walking away into the hills that border the town.
Tom Fury/Dwarf
A lightning rod salesman who, succumbing to his desire to see the Most Beautiful Woman in the World, is turned into an insane dwarf by the carnival and is recruited into it, with no memories of his former life.

== Themes ==
As in Dandelion Wine, Bradbury infuses the novel with nostalgia for his childhood. However, Dandelion Wine embodies the idyllic memories of youth, whereas Something Wicked This Way Comes superimposes folk-tale and supernatural elements over a small-town Americana setting in order to explore the dark undercurrents that surround the transition to adulthood.

The novel also conveys the theme that the power that people, objects, and ideas have over to some individual depends on the power the individual instills in them with own mind. Because of this, the carnival is able to easily take advantage of the common human fears of aging, death, and loneliness which everyone has or relates to.

Self-centered desires and wishes are portrayed as the base of human malice and unhappiness because they blind people to the blessings of life with an unattainable dream. An example of this is Miss Foley's seduction by Cooger's promise of youth that causes her to fail to see his deception as her "nephew" and lose her rightful place in society.

It is implied that the counter-force against this is acceptance of one's faults and an enthusiastic pursuit of the everyday joys of life, signified by Charles's spontaneous running with Jim and Will at the end of the novel. The fact that he is nearly forty years older than them pales in comparison to the pleasure he gains from simple human companionship.

== Reception ==
Critics have praised Something Wicked This Way Comes as a classic of fantasy and horror, noting its masterful blending of both genres and Bradbury's unusual and mesmerizing prose. The most referenced characteristic of the novel's plot is its unusual subtlety and realism for its genres.

The magazine Science Fiction Weekly published a review of the novel, saying in part:

A dark fantasy set in a small town, its people are brought to life so expertly readers feel very much like citizens ... even when their adopted hometown is menaced by outside forces against which it is helpless. Bradbury's prose is musical and hypnotic, fully engaging the senses and emotions. This is a book, once opened, that truly makes the real world disappear.

Science Fiction Crowsnest, another science fiction magazine, reviewed it with high praise, referring to it as a "Masterwork" with "a suitably fantastic and scary plot around colourful description ... with hidden meanings, mysteries and symbols adding to the layers of tension".

The Denver Rocky Mountain News said in 1999: "If rational beings had created the 100 best books of the century list, this one would surely have been on it."

== Legacy and literary influence ==
Something Wicked This Way Comes has served as a direct influence on several fantasy and horror authors, including Neil Gaiman and Stephen King. Gaiman paid tribute to Bradbury's influence on him and many of his peers in a 2012 The Guardian article following Bradbury's death. King discusses this novel at length in his 1981 non-fiction book Danse Macabre and also in his 2022 fantasy book Fairy Tale.

The book influenced R. L. Stine, who said: "Ray Bradbury is one of my favorite authors. I always tell people that the scariest book I ever read was one of his books—Something Wicked This Way Comes". Clive Barker also placed the book fourth on his list of greatest books about good and evil, number one being Moby-Dick.

The Wild Beyond the Witchlight, a Dungeons & Dragons module, takes heavy inspiration from Something Wicked This Way Comes, both thematically, and by taking the character name "Mr. Dark".

== Reference in other works ==
The title is a quotation from William Shakespeare's play Macbeth.

Its title and circus setting are referenced in a 2024 Simpsons episode, "Treehouse of Horror Presents: Simpsons Wicked This Way Comes"

The title is referenced by name and author in “Forbidden Door” by Dean Koontz. Cornell Jasperson reads the book for Travis Hawk. In chapter 46 of the audiobook. “The Forbidden Door” by “Dean Koontz”

Its title is also referenced in a 2014 Rick and Morty episode, "Something Ricked This Way Comes", the title is also referenced in an episode of "The Grim Adventures of Billy and Mandy" entitled "Something Stupid This Way Comes", this title was also used in an episode of "The Patrick Star Show".

== Adaptations ==
The novel was adapted for a low-budget 1972 British film, produced by the Forest Hill Film Unit & Drama Troupe and directed by Colin Finbow.

The novel was made into the 1983 The Bryna Company-Walt Disney Productions film Something Wicked This Way Comes, with Bradbury as the screenwriter. The production had been in development since the mid-1970s and was originally meant to be financed and distributed by Paramount Pictures. In a later interview, Bradbury said that he considered the film one of the better adaptations of his works.

Bradbury's Pandemonium Theatre Company performed a play based on the novel in Los Angeles on October 1, 2003, directed by Alan Neal Hubbs, also associated with the 1970 stage adaptation of Bradbury's 1950 book The Martian Chronicles. The main cast was Grady Hutt as Will Halloway, J. Skylar Testa as Jim Nightshade, Jay Gerber as Charles Halloway, and Mark Aaron as Mr. Dark. Critics gave the play generally favorable reviews, stating that it captured the lyricism and dark tone of the novel. They also praised its special effects, which included a carousel constructed of mirrors with actors as the horses, and Jay Gerber as Charles Halloway. Sharon Perlmutter of Talkin' Broadway, however, said that Hutt and Testa gave bland performances as the two lead characters.

Something Wicked This Way Comes was produced as a full-cast radio play by the Colonial Radio Theatre on the Air, and released by Blackstone Audio on October 1, 2007. Ray Bradbury wrote the script, modified for audio from his stage play. The cast includes Jerry Robbins as Mr. Halloway, J.T. Turner as Mr. Dark, Anastas Varinos as Will Halloway, and Matthew Scott Robertson as Jim Nightshade. This production was directed by Nancy Curran Willis, with music by Jeffrey Gage and post-production by Chris Snyder.

Catherine Wheels adapted Something Wicked This Way Comes for the stage in coproduction with the National Theatre of Scotland in 2008. The production opened at the Byre Theatre, St Andrews on October 27, 2009, and toured the UK.

Something Wicked This Way Comes was produced as a radio play for the BBC Radio 4 Saturday Play series and was broadcast on October 29, 2011. The production was adapted for radio by Diana Griffiths and produced/directed by Pauline Harris with music by David Paul Jones and sound by Paul Cargill. The cast included Theo Gregory as Will, Josef Lindsay as Jim, Henry Goodman as Charles Halloway, Gerard McDermott as Mr. Cooger/The Lightning Rod Salesman and Kenneth Cranham as Mr. Dark.

A musical adaptation of Something Wicked This Way Comes with Book by Brian Hill and music and lyrics by Neil Bartram was produced at the Delaware Theatre Company in 2017 and earned 11 Barrymore Award nominations.

== Release details ==
- 1962, U.S., Simon & Schuster (ISBN 0-671-67960-0), pub date: September 1962, hardcover (First edition)
- 1963, U.S. Bantam (ASIN B000NQBVPO Bantam # H2630), pub date: September 1963, paperback (first printing)
- 1983, U.S., Alfred A. Knopf (ISBN 0-394-53041-1), pub date: March 1983, hardcover
- 1997, U.S., Bantam US (ISBN 0-553-28032-5), pub date: December 1997, paperback (Grand Master Editions)
- 1998, U.S., Avon (ISBN 0-380-72940-7), pub date: March 1998, paperback (Mass Market Paperback)
- 1999, U.S., Eos (ISBN 0-380-97727-3), pub date: June 1999, hardcover
- 2001, U.S., Bookspan (ISBN 0-9650204-5-2), pub date: 2001, hardcover

== See also ==
- Bibliography of Halloween
