= Massenet (surname) =

Massenet is a French surname. Notable people with the surname include:

- Jules Massenet (1842–1912), French composer
- Juliette de La Genière (née Massenet; 1927–2022), French archaeologist
- Man'ha Garreau-Dombasle (born Germaine Massenet; 1898–1999), French-born writer, poet, and translator
- Natalie Massenet (born 1965), British-American fashion entrepreneur and journalist
