= Man'ha Garreau-Dombasle =

Man'ha Garreau-Dombasle, born Germaine Massenet (June 11, 1898 – August 4, 1999) was a writer, poet, and translator. Among others, she translated her friend Ray Bradbury's 1953 novel Fahrenheit 451 into French. He later dedicated his 1972 novel, The Halloween Tree, to her: "With love for Madame Man'ha Garreau-Dombasle met twenty-seven years ago in the graveyard at midnight on the Island of Janitzio at Lake Pátzcuaro, Mexico, and remembered on each anniversary of the Day of the Dead."

Born in Calais, June 11, 1898, Garreau-Dombasle was the grandmother of French-American singer, actress and director Arielle Dombasle. Garreau-Dombasle died in Deauville, on August 4, 1999.
