= William D. Block Memorial Law Library =

Coordinates: 42°21′35″N 87°49′57″W

The William D. Block Memorial Law Library serves the Nineteenth Judicial Circuit, Lake County, Illinois.

The Law Library is named after the late William D. Block, who served as a Judge for the Nineteenth Judicial Circuit from February 1, 1975 to June 27, 1996. The Lake County Law Library was originally formed in 1915 and was later renamed in honor of Judge Block on February 10, 1998. A strong leader on and off the bench, the judge was also known for his tireless research in the pursuit of justice. Judge Block's legacy lives on in the Law Library, which is dedicated to serving the legal and research needs of the judges, attorneys, and citizens of Lake County.

It is the mission of the William D. Block Memorial Law Library to serve the public. It accomplishes this goal by providing an open and efficient system of access to the Library's collections and services for the judges, attorneys, and citizens of Lake County.

The law library is available to all patrons in need of legal information. The library consists of a complete collection of primary and secondary sources for Illinois, Wisconsin, and Federal Law. Primary sources are the statutes, codes, regulations and court opinions that comprise the law. Secondary sources are books, guides, and practice manuals that explain and interpret the law.

== See also ==
- Waukegan Public Library
