= Waukegan Public Library =

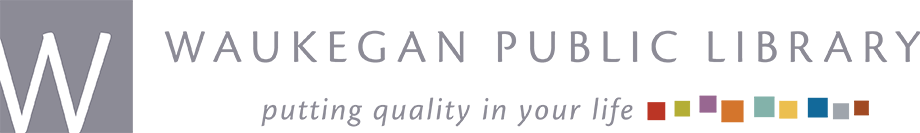
- 42.36217°N 87.83285°W
- Location: Waukegan, Illinois, United States
- Type: Public
- Established: 1902
- Branches: 2

Collection
- Size: 205,000

Access and use
- Circulation: 479,603 (2005)
- Population served: 89,500

Other information
- Director: Tiffany Verzani
- Website: http://waukeganpl.org

The Waukegan Public Library is the public library serving Waukegan, Illinois. It is at the intersection of County and Clayton streets in downtown Waukegan, near the county government complex.

The library has approximately 205,000 books as of 2011, and recorded a total of 338,615 library visits in fiscal year 2005. In addition to its main location in downtown Waukegan, the library operates a branch in Hinkston Park, on the city's northwest side.

In 2013, the Waukegan Public Library was selected as one of ten recipients of the National Medal for Museum and Library Service, "the nation's highest honor conferred on museums and libraries for service to the community and celebrates institutions that make a difference for individuals, families, and communities," awarded by the Institute of Museum and Library Services. The award was based on the library's successful work in providing literacy and ESL instruction. The library has also received the Public Library Association's Upstart Innovation Award on three occasions.

== History ==
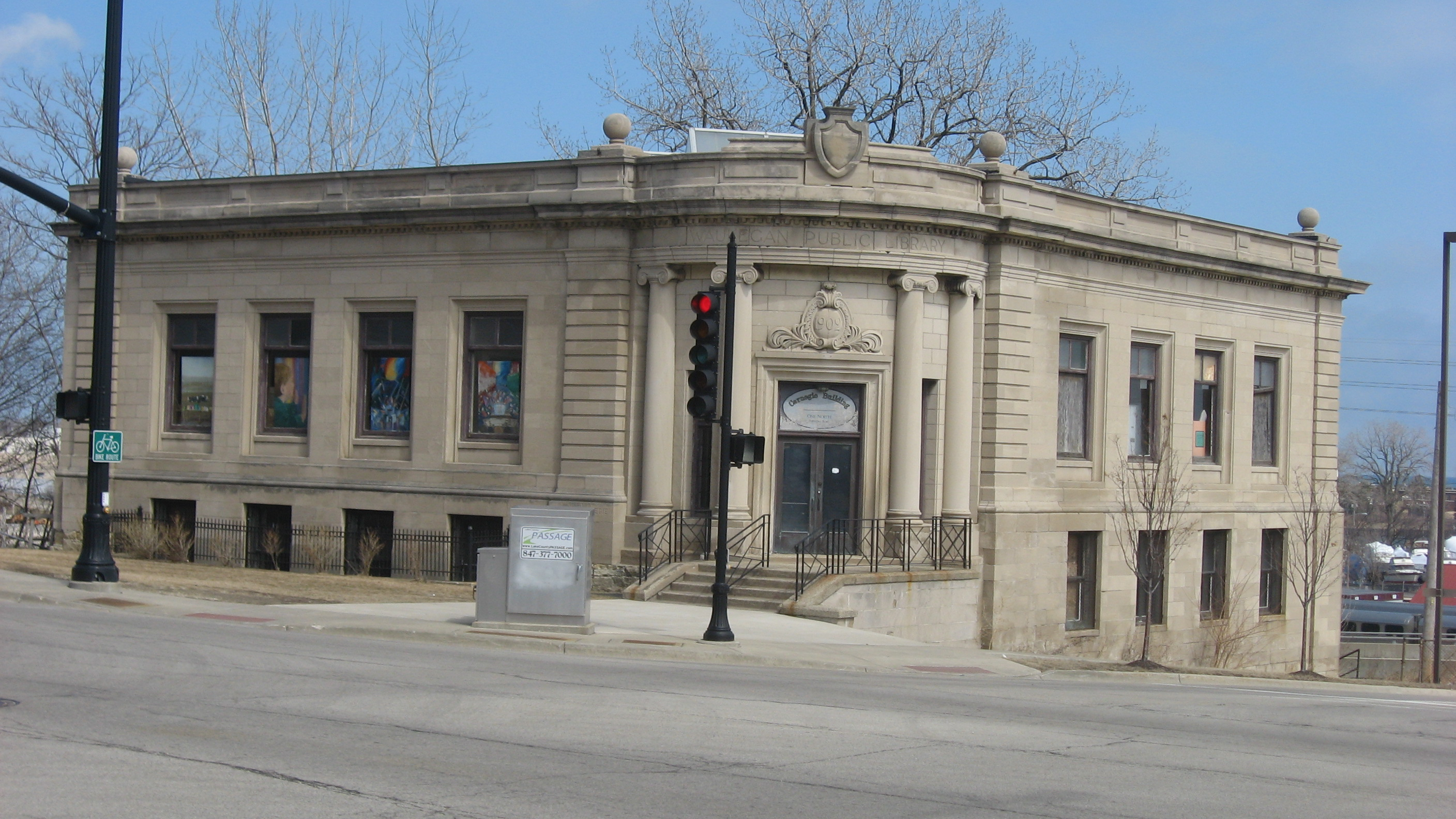
The original Carnegie library

As with many towns across the United States, Waukegan was served by private subscription libraries for many decades before acquiring a public library. The first of these was the "Little Fort Reading Room and Library Association", housed in the courthouse and established in 1845. This was followed by the Young Men's Association Library in the 1860s, and finally by the Sesame Club in the 1890s, which sought to establish a free public library. After successfully operating a free library for two years, the Club appealed to the Waukegan city government for support, and in 1898 the Waukegan Public Library was formally created when the city took ownership of the Sesame Club's library.

However, the library still lacked an actual building. This situation was not remedied until 1903, when the Carnegie Foundation provided $25,000 to the city to support construction of a library building, in exchange for the city providing a building site and guarantee of annual support. The Carnegie library, which still stands as of 2013, was located at the corner of Sheridan Road and Washington Street. During the 1930s, the library provided a frequent refuge for the young Ray Bradbury, who later willed his personal book collection to the library.

In the 1950s, as Waukegan's expanding population began to exceed what the small Carnegie library could serve, the library began to operate bookmobiles, the first coming into service in 1956 and the second in 1962. The "Friends of the Waukegan Public Library" organization was formed in 1963.

The limestone building currently occupied by the Waukegan Public Library, located at the corner of County and Clayton streets, was opened for business on December 27, 1965. A major renovation in 1998 added some 16,000 square feet, while remaining faithful to the building's original esthetic. In 2008, based on analysis of the need for literacy exposure among Waukegan kindergarten students, the library opened a 2,000-square-foot Early Learning Center in the children's department. Further renovations the following year created an area known as the "Literacy Suite", which hosts one-on-one and group tutoring in literacy and computer skills.

After Shimer College moved to Waukegan in 1979, much of the school's library was housed in the basement of the Waukegan Public Library, due to the school itself having insufficient space. This made it nearly unique among municipal libraries in housing a college's main collection within its own. The college and library maintained numerous ties, including the painting of a mural on "the Art of the Story" on the library building in 2004. After Shimer left for Chicago in 2006, the basement space that had been used for the Shimer collection was repurposed.

== Services and holdings ==
As of 2005, the Waukegan Public Library held 224,390 books and serial volumes, or 2.55 for every person in its service area. It also held more than 18,000 video materials and more than 16,000 audio materials. Circulation in 2005 was 479,603, nearly 2 checkouts per resource and more than 5 per capita.

As of 2011, the library had 73 computer terminals for library users. The library offers tutoring and small group classes in computer skills.

The city of Waukegan has a Hispanic population more than three times that of Illinois as a whole. 55% of Waukeganites are non-native speakers of English. In recognition of this, the library offers extensive educational programs in English as a second language. In 2012, it began the "Promotoras Ambassador Program", which sends trained volunteers into the community to better assess the types of library programs that are needed. Among the initiatives that the library embarked upon based on the feedback from the community ambassadors was the Conversational ESL Program, which in its first year graduated 255 students, most of whom went on to receive GEDs.

Children's programs offered by the library include the Bus to Us program, which was established in 2011 in response to the effect of cuts to funding for field trips by public schools, which had left many children without any way to reach the library. In 2013, the But to Us program received the Upstart Innovation Award from the Public Library Association, a branch of the American Library Association.

In 2015, the library underwent a remodel of its main floor in order to meet the needs of its patrons by creating spaces for collaboration and quiet study and increasing the number of classrooms. A central meeting room features a movable wall enabling it to divide easily into two classrooms, and the new floor plan also features several open group workstations. The workstations, found just around the corner from the study rooms and opposite the Friends’ Book Sale, provide comfortable seating for five, with flatscreens enabling patrons to link up their laptops and collaborate.

== Ray Bradbury Creative Contest ==
The Waukegan Public Library hosts an annual creative contest for artists and authors in honor of Waukegan native Ray Bradbury. Submissions include fiction, visual art, and poetry, with awards given in the adult, high school, middle school, and elementary categories. Past and present recipients of the Ray Bradbury Creative Contest Awards include Margaret Young, Dexter Fabi, Tara V. Purtell, Jennifer Tidemann, Timothy McGlen, and Kimberly Horta. The first annual Ray Bradbury Creative Contest at the Waukegan Public Library was held in 1984 and has been held consecutively since then.

== See also ==
- William D. Block Memorial Law Library
