= Green Shadows, White Whale =

1992 novel by Ray Bradbury

- Dust-jacket from the first edition
- Author: Ray Bradbury
- Language: English
- Genre: Fantasy, Soft science fiction
- Publisher: Alfred A. Knopf
- Publication date: 1992
- Publication place: United States
- Media type: Print (Hardcover and Paperback)
- Pages: 271
- ISBN: 0-394-57878-3
- OCLC: 25095626
- Dewey Decimal: 813/.54 20
- LC Class: PS3503.R167 G75 1992

Green Shadows, White Whale is a 1992 novel by Ray Bradbury. It gives a fictionalized account of his journey to Ireland in 1953-1954 to write a screen adaptation of the novel Moby-Dick with director John Huston. Bradbury has said he wrote it after reading actress Katharine Hepburn's account of filming The African Queen with Huston in Africa. The title itself is a play on Peter Viertel's novel White Hunter, Black Heart, which is also about Huston.

Bradbury considers Green Shadows to be the culmination of thirty-five years of short stories, poems, and plays that were inspired by his stay in Ireland. As with most of his previous short-story collections, including The Illustrated Man and The Martian Chronicles, many of the short stories were originally published elsewhere and modified slightly for publication in the novel.

== Plot ==
The narrator, an unnamed writer, is sent to Dublin, Ireland to coproduce a film adaptation of Moby Dick with a director whose first name is given as "John". The narrator checks in at the Royal Hibernian Hotel in Dublin before leaving for Heeber Finn's Pub in Kilcock, where he converses with several local characters.

The narrator meets with his director, John, and John's wife, Ricki. At dinner, John tells a story about his and his wife's trip to Spain, which ends with the couple arguing. The narrator flashes back to when he was buying his travel copy of Moby Dick and a woman warned him not to go to Ireland because the director was a monster.

The remainder of the novel consists of a series of unrelated short stories, most containing surreal and fantastic elements, inspired by Irish customs and culture. Meanwhile, the narrator works for weeks on what he refers to as "the Whale" through the rain in Ireland. In the last chapter, the narrator shows John the finished script. John is impressed and says that he should take the ferry to England. The narrator tells the people in Finn's pub what he's found out about Ireland and says goodbye to them. As he leaves, he sees the hills as green.

Cover of a paperback reprint edition

== Literary significance and criticism ==
Green Shadows, White Whale received mixed reviews at its debut. Some critics gave the work high praise: Publishers Weekly said it was a "lighthearted, beguiling autobiographical novel", concluding, "Bradbury's prose is as vibrant and distinctive as the landscape in which these delightful tales are set." Kirkus Reviews called it "Bradbury's triumph. He has never written better."

Others found it to fall short because of its stilted diction and stereotypical characters and plots. The New York Times found it "Somewhere between homage and hokum … a cartoon that might be offensive if it weren't so affectionate." The Los Angeles Times said it was "a charming, delicate story" of Bradbury's memories, and what they mean to him, "and if at times the words seem hushed, muted in their reverence for history, the cast of characters … keeps the story from sliding headlong into wistfulness." David Soyka of the SF Site labeled the novel as a "disappointment" because of its clichéd plots and lack of coherency of the stories' themes. The Chicago Tribune criticized Bradbury's "tin ear" for dialogue, complaining that "All of his Irish characters talk like Barry Fitzgerald reciting Seán O'Casey to a busload of tourists from Tulsa."
