= The Halloween Tree (film) =

1993 film directed by Mario Piluso

- 1996 VHS release cover
- Based on: The Halloween Tree by Ray Bradbury
- Written by: Ray Bradbury
- Directed by: Mario Piluso
- Voices of: Leonard Nimoy; Annie Barker; Alex Greenwald; Edan Gross; Kevin Smets; Andrew Keegan
- Narrated by: Ray Bradbury
- Composer: John Debney
- Country of origin: United States
- Original language: English

Production
- Executive producer: David Kirschner
- Producer: Mario Piluso
- Editor: Gil Iverson
- Running time: 69 minutes
- Production companies: Hanna-Barbera Cartoons; Animation: Fil-Cartoons

Original release
- Network: TBS; Syndication
- Release: October 30, 1993

The Halloween Tree is a 1993 American animated fantasy-drama television film produced by Hanna-Barbera and based on Ray Bradbury's 1972 fantasy novel of the same name. The film tells the story of a group of trick-or-treating children who learn about the origins and influences of Halloween when one of their friends is spirited away by mysterious forces. Bradbury serves as the narrator of the film, which also stars Leonard Nimoy as the children's guide, Mr. Moundshroud. Bradbury also wrote the film's screenplay. The animation of the film was produced overseas for Hanna-Barbera by Fil-Cartoons in the Philippines. The film premiered on TBS and Syndication on October 30, 1993.

The film is often featured on Cartoon Network during the Halloween season. The film changes the novel's group of night travelers from eight boys to three boys and a girl. A longer limited edition of the novel was published in 2005, which included the screenplay.

== Plot ==
The narrator (Ray Bradbury) describes one small American town's preparations for Halloween night. Four friends are shown at their respective homes donning costumes: Jenny as a witch; Ralph as a mummy; Wally as a monster; and Tom Skelton as a skeleton. They plan to meet up with their best friend, Joe "Pip" Pipkin, but he does not appear. They go to Pip's house and see him being loaded into an ambulance with his parents riding along with him. He has written them a note explaining that he is going to the hospital for an emergency appendectomy and that they should celebrate without him. They feel they cannot start Halloween without him, so they follow the ambulance to visit him at the hospital. Tom suggests a shortcut through the spooky woods: the dark and eerie ravine. They see what looks like a translucent Pip running along the ravine trail, and Tom leads them on, convinced that Pip has designed an elaborate hoax for them. The group races after Pip, who disappears near a towering and darkened mansion.

A man named Carapace Clavicle Moundshroud greets them inside. Moundshroud expresses disappointment that none of the children know what their costumes symbolize. He reveals that he is after the ghost of Pip. Pip seeks and steals a pumpkin with his face carved into it from Moundshroud's Halloween Tree of jack-o'-lanterns. Tom begs Moundshroud to let them come with him and help bring back Pip. Moundshroud initially refuses but relents: if they can keep up with him before dawn, then they might be able to retrieve the pumpkin and get Pip back, while also going on a scavenger hunt of sorts to learn about the significance of their costumes and the origins of Halloween. They begin their pursuit of Pip, traveling back in time by ripping down old circus posters from a nearby barn and crafting a giant October Kite, with the children hanging on as a weighted tail. Moundshroud then takes the four friends to four different places in four different periods in time that coincide with their respective costumes.

First, they travel to Ancient Egypt to learn of the celebration called 'the Feast of the Ghosts'. Following Pip's spirit to a tomb in a pyramid, they learn about the significance of mummification. Ralph finds a weak-spirited Pip and begs him to come back. As the priests began trying to embalm Pip, Ralph scares them away by pretending to be a real mummy. When Moundshroud confronts him again, Pip uses his pumpkin's magic to escape him, and the group chases him through time, once more.

Next, arriving at Stonehenge during the Dark Ages in England, they witness rituals carried out by Celtic druids and villagers of the old Celtic world. As Moundshroud teaches them, Pip briefly appears as a black cat. They come across a field of straw being harvested and made into brooms and discover a coven of witches chanting and celebrating the New Year. Moundshroud helps the children escape a mob of anti-witch villagers by making some of the brooms fly, then knocks Pip off his broom in an attempt to snatch away his pumpkin. Jenny catches Pip but is afraid of losing him. He encourages her and then darts away.

They follow him to France and arrive at the unfinished Notre Dame Cathedral in Paris, learning of the cathedral's use of gargoyles and demons. The children use Moundshroud's magic to finish the cathedral, and Wally climbs to reach a Pip-shaped gargoyle that is holding Pip's pumpkin. He begs Pip to be strong; Pip flees again and the group follows.

Finally, in Mexico, they learn about the significance of skeletons during "Día de los Muertos" — the Day of the Dead festival. They find a very weak Pip in a catacombs. Tom manages to get to Pip and apologizes to him, admitting he feels guilty for the whole ordeal because he once wished for something bad to happen to Pip so he could lead the group for once. Pip smiles and forgives him, promising to let him lead anytime he wants. Pip's spirit crumbles into dust and is gone.

Moundshroud tells the children they did not make it in time and Pip is now his property. The children offer him a year from the end of each of their lives in exchange for Pip's return. He accepts the deal and gives each of them a piece of a sugar candy skull with Pip's name on it to eat, sealing the bargain. Pip's spirit then revives, and he snatches his pumpkin back from Moundshroud and flies out. The group is then immediately transported home to America in the present day, having completed the four-thousand-year journey. The children go to Pip's house to see if the experience was real and are delighted to see him back from the hospital. At the mansion, Moundshroud blows out his pumpkin's candle, turns into smoke and disappears; the Halloween Tree is assaulted by strong winds, blowing all the pumpkins away, except for Pip's "pumpkin", which the children saved through their own sacrifice.

== Voice cast ==
- Ray Bradbury as The Narrator
- Leonard Nimoy as Carapace Clavicle Moundshroud
- Annie Barker as Jenny, The Witch
- Darleen Carr as Additional Voices (voice)
- Lindsay Crouse as Additional Voices (voice)
- Alex Greenwald as Ralph, The Mummy
- Edan Gross as Tom Skelton, The Skeleton
- Andrew Keegan as Wally, The Monster
- Kevin Michaels as Joe "Pip" Pipkin, The Ghost
- Mark L. Taylor as Additional Voices (voice)

== Awards ==
Ray Bradbury won the 1994 Emmy Award for Outstanding Writing in an Animated Program for The Halloween Tree, and the film was nominated for Outstanding Animated Program.

== Home media ==
The Halloween Tree was released on VHS by Turner Home Entertainment in the 1990s. The first release on September 14, 1994, and its re-release on August 29, 1995, includes a Yogi Bear short Bewitched Bear, which is shown before the film. Both the 1994 and 1995 releases also featured a free copy of the 1972 novel of the same name packaged inside each of the VHS tape copies. The film was also released on LaserDisc with an audio commentary by Ray Bradbury being included. Turner re-released the film on VHS on September 10, 1996, as part of the Cartoon Network Video series with multiple re-issues by Warner Home Video from August 26, 1997, to August 21, 2001. In August 2012, Warner Archive released the film on DVD as part of the Hanna-Barbera Classic Collection series.

=== VHS release dates ===
- September 14, 1994 (Turner Home Entertainment)
- August 29, 1995 (Turner Home Entertainment)
- September 10, 1996 (Turner Home Entertainment/Cartoon Network Video)
- August 26, 1997 — August 21, 2001 (Warner Home Video)

=== DVD release dates ===
- August 28, 2012 (Warner Home Video/Warner Archive)
- August 30, 2016 (Warner Home Video)

== See also ==
- List of films set around Halloween
- List of ghost films
- List of films about witchcraft
