= Summer Morning, Summer Night =

2002 short story collection by Ray Bradbury

- First edition cover, illustrated by Bradbury
- Editor: Donn Albright and Jon Eller
- Author: Ray Bradbury
- Publisher: PS Publishing
- Publication date: 2002

Summer Morning, Summer Night is a short story collection by American writer Ray Bradbury, edited by Donn Albright, and Jon Eller and first published in by 2002 PS Publishing. All the stories except one are set in Green Town, Illinois, Bradbury's name for his hometown of Waukegan, Illinois. Several of the stories feature some of the characters from his 1957 book, Dandelion Wine. Some stories are less than one page long.

== Contents ==
The collection contains:

- End of Summer (1948)
- The Great Fire (1949)
- All on a Summer's Night (1950)
- Miss Bidwell (1950)
- The Pumpernickel (1951)
- At Midnight, in the Month of June (1954)
- A Walk in Summer (1979)
- Autumn Afternoon (2002)
- Arrival and Departure
- The Beautiful Lady
- Love Potion
- Night Meeting
- The Death of So-and-So
- I Got Something You Ain't Got!
- The Waders
- The Dog
- The River That Went to the Sea
- Over, Over, Over, Over, Over, Over, Over, Over!
- The Projector
- The People with Seven Arms
- A Serious Discussion (or Evil in the World)
- The Fireflies
- The Circus
- The Cemetery (or The Tombyard)
- Summer's End
