= Farewell Summer =

2006 novel by Ray Bradbury

- Author: Ray Bradbury
- Language: English
- Genre: Autobiographical novel
- Publisher: William Morrow
- Publication date: October 17, 2006
- Publication place: United States
- Media type: Print (hardback)
- Pages: 224
- ISBN: 0-06-113154-7
- OCLC: 70335478
- Dewey Decimal: 813/.54 22
- LC Class: PS3503.R167 F45 2006
- Preceded by: Dandelion Wine and Something Wicked This Way Comes

Farewell Summer is a novel by American writer Ray Bradbury, published on October 17, 2006. It was his last novel released in his lifetime. It is a sequel to his 1957 novel Dandelion Wine, and is set during an Indian summer in October 1929. The story concerns a mock war between the young and the old in Green Town, Illinois, and the sexual awakening of Doug Spaulding as he turns 14. With Something Wicked This Way Comes, they form a trilogy of novels inspired by Bradbury's childhood in Waukegan, Illinois.

The first chapter, also titled Farewell Summer, appeared in The Stories of Ray Bradbury in 1980. Jonathan R. Eller and William F. Touponce discuss a draft of the unpublished novel in some detail in their book, Ray Bradbury: The Life of Fiction (2004).

Publishers Weekly called the novel a "poignant, wise but slight 'extension' of the indefatigable Bradbury's semiautobiographical Dandelion Wine" and concluded, "Bradbury's mature but fresh return to his beloved early writing conveys a depth of feeling." Kirkus Reviews found it "a thin work, heavily reliant on dialogue, but one that serves as an intriguing coda to one of Bradbury's classics." Booklist said, "A touching meditation on memories, aging, and the endless cycle of birth and death, and a fitting capstone, perhaps, to a brilliant career."

== History ==
In the afterword to Farewell Summer, Bradbury ... contends that the novel was actually intended to follow what became the Dandelion Wine story arc as a complete book tentatively titled Summer Morning, Summer Night. "When I delivered it to my publishers they said, 'My God, this is much too long. Why don't we publish the first 90,000 words as a novel and keep the second part for some future year when it is ready to be published'" (pp. 207–208).
