= Ray Bradbury =

American writer (1920–2012)

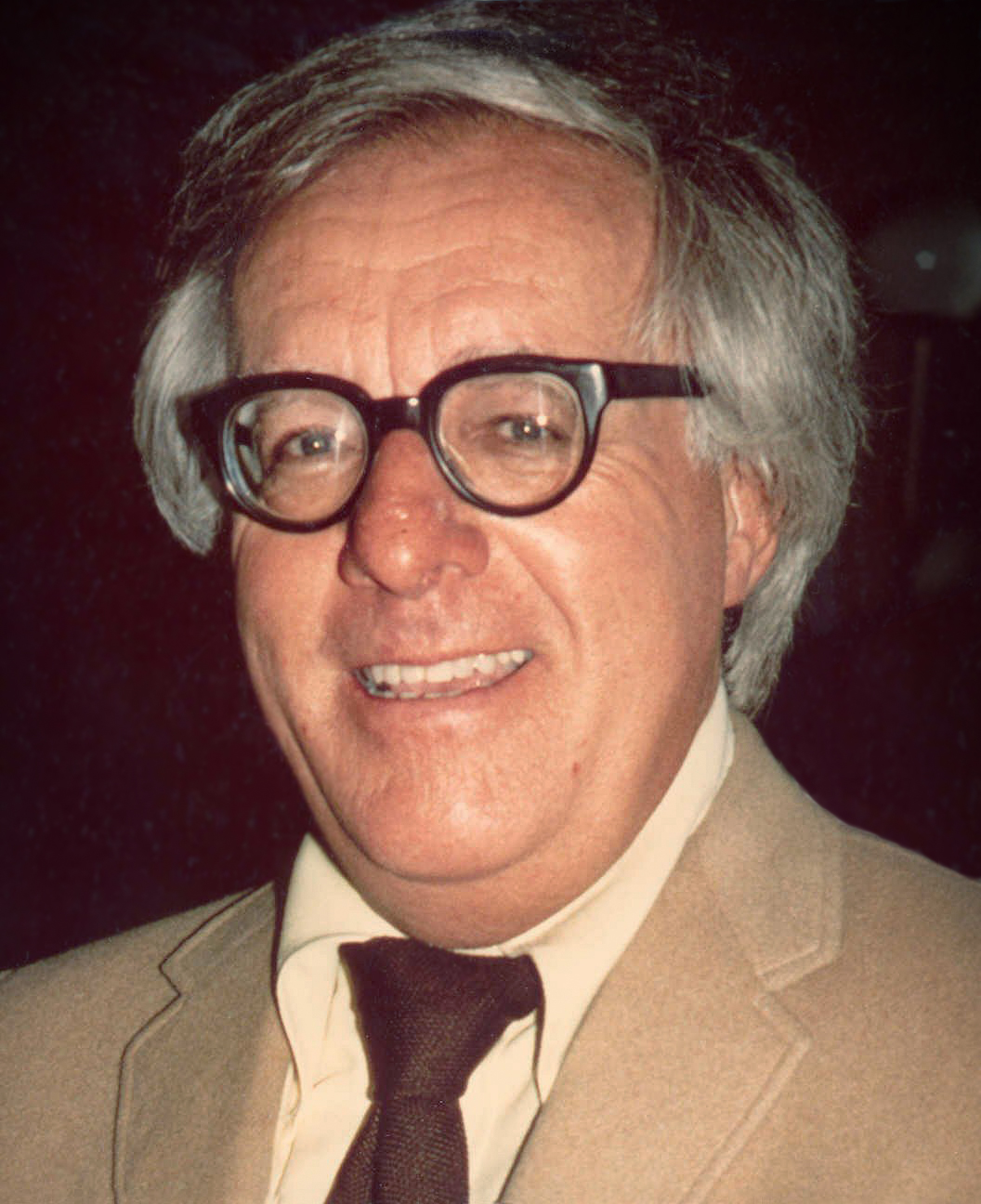
- Bradbury in 1975
- Born: Ray Douglas Bradbury; August 22, 1920; Waukegan, Illinois, U.S.
- Died: June 5, 2012 (aged 91); Los Angeles, California, U.S.
- Resting place: Westwood Memorial Park
- Occupation: Writer
- Spouse: Marguerite McClure (m. 1947; died 2003)
- Children: 4, including Bettina
- Writing career
- Period: 1938–2012
- Genres: Fantasy; science fiction; horror fiction; mystery fiction; magic realism
- Notable works: Fahrenheit 451 (1953); The Martian Chronicles (1950); Something Wicked This Way Comes (1962); The Illustrated Man (1951)
- Notable awards: American Academy of Arts and Letters (1954); Inkpot Award (1974); Daytime Emmy Award (1994); National Medal of Arts (2004); Pulitzer Prize Special Citation (2007)
- Website: www.raybradbury.com

Ray Douglas Bradbury (US: /ˈbrædbɛri/ BRAD-berr-ee; August 22, 1920 – June 5, 2012) was an American author and screenwriter. One of the most celebrated 20th-century American writers, he worked in a variety of genres, including fantasy, science fiction, horror, mystery, and realistic fiction.

Bradbury is best known for his novel Fahrenheit 451 (1953) and his short-story collections The Martian Chronicles (1950), The Illustrated Man (1951), and The October Country (1955). Other notable works include the coming of age novel Dandelion Wine (1957), the dark fantasy Something Wicked This Way Comes (1962) and the fictionalized memoir Green Shadows, White Whale (1992). He also wrote and consulted on screenplays and television scripts, including Moby Dick and It Came from Outer Space. Many of his works were adapted into television and film productions as well as comic books. Bradbury also wrote poetry which has been published in several collections, such as They Have Not Seen the Stars (2001).

The New York Times called Bradbury "An author whose fanciful imagination, poetic prose, and mature understanding of human character have won him an international reputation" and "the writer most responsible for bringing modern science fiction into the literary mainstream".

== Early life ==
Bradbury was born on August 22, 1920, in Waukegan, Illinois, to Esther (née Moberg) Bradbury (1888–1966), a Swedish immigrant, and Leonard Spaulding Bradbury (1890–1957), a power and telephone lineman of English ancestry. He was given the middle name "Douglas" after actor Douglas Fairbanks.

Bradbury was surrounded by an extended family during his early childhood and formative years in Waukegan. His grandparents lived next door, and an aunt read him short stories when he was a child. This period provided foundations for both the author and his stories. In Bradbury's fiction, 1920s Waukegan becomes Green Town, Illinois.

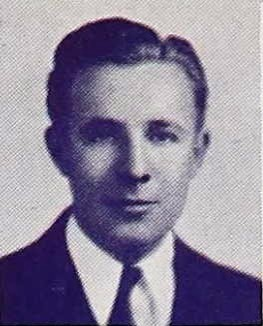
Bradbury as a senior in high school, 1938

The Bradbury family lived in Tucson, Arizona, during 1926–1927 and 1932–1933 while their father pursued employment, each time returning to Waukegan. While in Tucson, Bradbury attended Amphi Junior High School and Roskruge Junior High School. They eventually settled in Los Angeles in 1934 when Bradbury was 14. The family arrived with only US$40 (equivalent to $963 in 2025), which paid for rent and food until his father finally found a job making wire at a cable company for $14 a week (equivalent to $337 in 2025), allowing them to stay in Hollywood.

Bradbury attended Los Angeles High School and was active in the drama club. He often roller-skated through Hollywood in hopes of meeting celebrities. Among the creative people he met were special-effects pioneer Ray Harryhausen and radio star George Burns. Bradbury's first pay as a writer, at age 14, was for a joke he sold to George Burns to use on the Burns and Allen radio show.

Bradbury was fascinated with carnivals from a young age, and they would feature in such works as The Illustrated Man and Something Wicked This Way Comes. He related a formative event of his youth:

I suppose the most important memory is of Mr. Electrico. On Labor Day weekend, 1932, when I was twelve years old, he came to my hometown with the Dill Brothers ... He was a performer sitting in an electric chair and a stagehand pulled a switch and he was charged with fifty thousand volts of pure electricity. Lightning flashed in his eyes and his hair stood on end. I sat below, in the front row, and he reached down with a flaming sword full of electricity and he tapped me on both shoulders and then the tip of my nose and he cried, "Live, forever!" And I thought, "God, that's wonderful. How do you do that?" ... So when I left the carnival that day I stood by the carousel and I watched the horses running around and around to the music of "Beautiful Ohio" and I cried. Tears streamed down my cheeks because I knew something important had happened to me that day because of Mr. Electrico. I felt changed. And so I went home and within days I started to write. And I've never stopped.

== Influences ==
=== Literature ===
Throughout his youth, Bradbury was an avid reader and writer and knew at a young age that he was "going into one of the arts". Bradbury began writing his own stories at age 12 (1931), sometimes writing on butcher paper.

In his youth, he spent much time in the Carnegie Library in Waukegan, reading such authors as H. G. Wells, Jules Verne and Edgar Allan Poe. At 12, he began writing traditional horror stories and said he tried to imitate Poe until he was about 18. Bradbury's favorite writers growing up included Katherine Anne Porter, Edith Wharton, and Jessamyn West. He loved the work of Edgar Rice Burroughs, especially his John Carter of Mars series; The Warlord of Mars impressed him so much that at age 12, he wrote his own sequel. The young Bradbury was also a cartoonist and loved to illustrate. He wrote about Tarzan and drew his own Sunday panels. He listened to the radio show Chandu the Magician, and every night when the show went off the air, he wrote out the entire script from memory.

As a teen in Beverly Hills, he often visited his mentor and friend, science-fiction writer Bob Olsen, sharing ideas and maintaining contact. In 1936, at a secondhand bookstore in Hollywood, Bradbury discovered a handbill promoting meetings of the Los Angeles Science Fiction Society. Excited to find others who shared his interest, he joined a Thursday-night conclave at age 16.

Bradbury cited Verne and Wells as his primary science-fiction influences. He identified with Verne, saying: "He believes the human being is in a strange situation in a very strange world, and he believes that we can triumph by behaving morally." Bradbury admitted that he stopped reading science-fiction books in his 20s and embraced a broad field of literature that included poets Alexander Pope and John Donne. He had just graduated from high school when he met Robert A. Heinlein, then 31. Bradbury recalled: "He was well known, and he wrote humanistic science fiction, which influenced me to dare to be human instead of mechanical." During his young adulthood, Bradbury read stories published in Astounding Science Fiction and read everything by Heinlein and Arthur C. Clarke, as well as the early writings of Theodore Sturgeon and A. E. van Vogt.

=== Comics ===
As a child, Bradbury collected Tarzan and Buck Rogers comic books, for which he was ridiculed in school. As a teenager, he discovered interest in Superman: "I recognized myself when I saw him in his reporter's outfit, bloodying his nose as he blundered into that phone booth."

=== Hollywood ===
The family lived about four blocks from the Fox Uptown Theatre on Western Avenue in Los Angeles, the flagship theater for MGM and Fox. There, Bradbury learned how to sneak in and watched previews almost every week. He roller skated there, as well as all over town, as he put it, "hell-bent on getting autographs from glamorous stars. It was glorious." Among stars the young Bradbury was thrilled to encounter were Norma Shearer, Laurel and Hardy, and Ronald Colman. Sometimes he spent all day in front of Paramount Pictures or Columbia Pictures, then skated to the Brown Derby to watch the stars who came and went for meals. He recounted seeing Cary Grant, Marlene Dietrich, and Mae West, who, he learned, made a regular appearance every Friday night, bodyguard in tow.

== Career ==
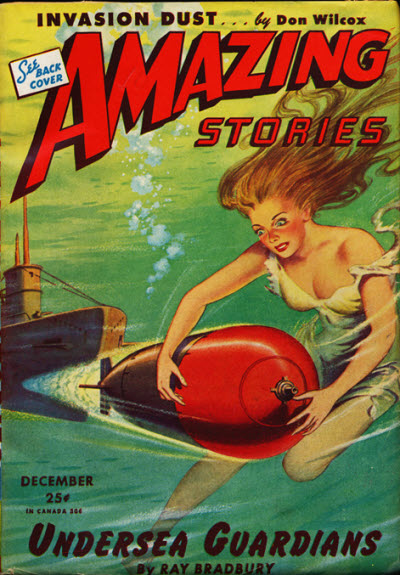
Bradbury's "Undersea Guardians" was the cover story for the December 1944 issue of Amazing Stories.

Bradbury was free to start a career in writing when, owing to his bad eyesight, he was rejected for induction into the military during World War II. Inspired by science-fiction heroes such as Flash Gordon and Buck Rogers, he began publishing science-fiction stories in fanzines in 1938. He was invited by Forrest J. Ackerman to attend the Los Angeles Science Fiction Society, which at the time met at Clifton's Cafeteria in downtown Los Angeles. There he met Robert A. Heinlein, Emil Petaja, Fredric Brown, Henry Kuttner, Leigh Brackett and Jack Williamson. Bradbury's first published story was "Hollerbochen's Dilemma", in the January 1938 number of Ackerman's fanzine Imagination!. In July 1939, Ackerman and his girlfriend Morojo gave 19-year-old Bradbury the money to head to New York for the First World Science Fiction Convention in New York City, and funded Bradbury's fanzine, Futuria Fantasia. Bradbury wrote most of its four issues, each volume printed in limited number due to publishing costs. Between 1940 and 1947, he was a contributor to Rob Wagner's film magazine, Script.

In 1939, Bradbury joined Laraine Day's Wilshire Players Guild, where for two years he wrote and acted in several plays. They were, as Bradbury later described, "so incredibly bad" that he gave up play-writing for two decades. His first paid piece, "Pendulum", written with Henry Hasse, was published in the pulp magazine Super Science Stories in November 1941, for which he earned $15.

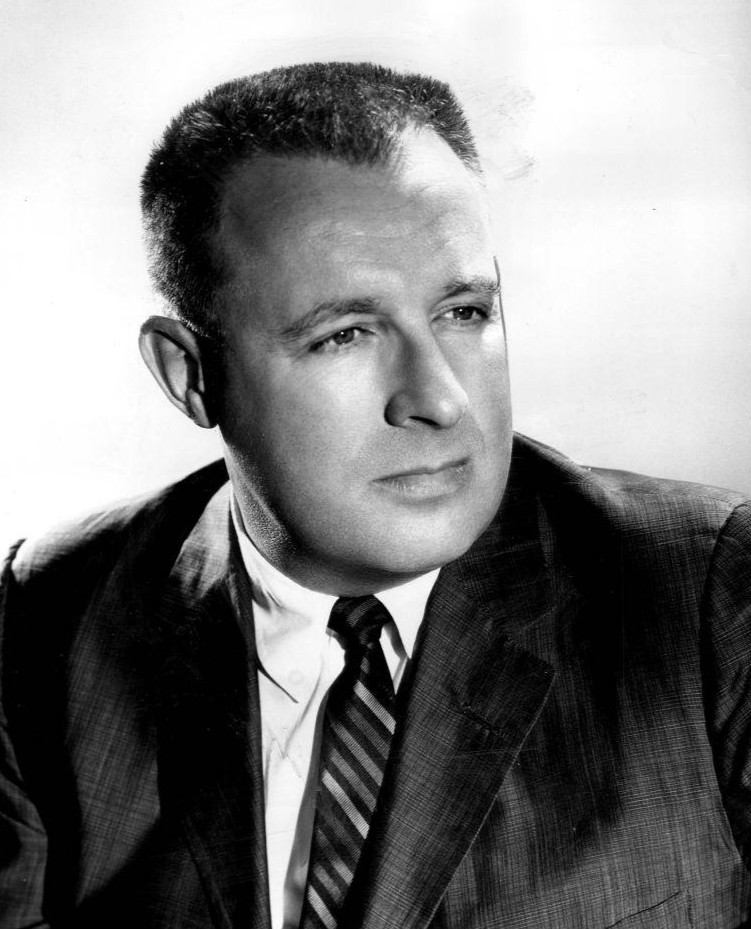
Bradbury in 1959

Bradbury sold his first solo story, "The Lake", for $13.75 at 22 and became a full-time writer by 24. His first collection of short stories, Dark Carnival, was published in 1947 by Arkham House, a small press in Sauk City, Wisconsin, owned by August Derleth. Reviewing Dark Carnival for the New York Herald Tribune, Will Cuppy proclaimed Bradbury "suitable for general consumption" and predicted that he would become a writer of the caliber of British fantasist John Collier.

After a rejection notice from the pulp Weird Tales, Bradbury submitted "Homecoming" to Mademoiselle, where it was spotted by a young editorial assistant named Truman Capote. Capote picked the Bradbury manuscript from a slush pile, which led to its publication. "Homecoming" won a place in the O. Henry Award Stories of 1947.

Bradbury first published The Fireman, a short story about 25,000 words long, in Galaxy Science Fiction in February 1951. Bradbury was asked to extend it by 25,000 words so that it would be published as a novel. Bradbury got the title after the Los Angeles fire chief told him that book paper burns at 451 °F. In UCLA's Powell Library, in a study room with typewriters for rent for ten cents per half-hour, Bradbury wrote his classic story of a book burning future, Fahrenheit 451, which was about 50,000 words long, costing him $9.80 in typewriter rental fees. Fahrenheit 451 was also published in serial form in the March, April and May 1954 issues of Playboy Magazine. Fahrenheit 451 remains a staple in discussions about censorship and dystopian futures. It remains a favorite among many readers.

A chance encounter in a Los Angeles bookstore with British expatriate writer Christopher Isherwood gave Bradbury the opportunity to put The Martian Chronicles into the hands of a respected critic. Isherwood's glowing review followed.

== Writing ==
Bradbury attributed his lifelong habit of writing every day to two incidents. The first, when he was three years old, was his mother's taking him to see Lon Chaney in the 1923 silent film The Hunchback of Notre Dame. The second occurred in 1932, when a carnival entertainer, one Mr. Electrico, knighted the young man with an electrified sword and intoned: "Live forever!" Bradbury remarked: "I felt that something strange and wonderful had happened to me because of my encounter with Mr. Electrico ... [he] gave me a future ... I began to write, full-time. I have written every single day of my life since that day 69 years ago." At that age, Bradbury first started to do magic, which was his first great love. He said that had he not discovered writing, he would have become a magician.

Bradbury claimed a wide variety of influences, and described discussions he might have had with his favorite writers, among them Robert Frost, William Shakespeare, John Steinbeck, Aldous Huxley, and Thomas Wolfe. From Steinbeck, he learned "how to write objectively and yet insert all of the insights without too much extra comment". He studied Eudora Welty for her "remarkable ability to give you atmosphere, character, and motion in a single line".

Bradbury was once described as a "Midwest surrealist" and is often labeled a science-fiction writer. He resisted that categorization, however, defining science fiction as "the art of the possible".

First of all, I don't write science fiction. I've only done one science fiction book and that's Fahrenheit 451, based on reality. Science fiction is a depiction of the real. Fantasy is a depiction of the unreal. So Martian Chronicles is not science fiction, it's fantasy. It couldn't happen, you see? That's the reason it's going to be around a long time—because it's a Greek myth, and myths have staying power.

— An Interview with Ray Bradbury

Bradbury recounted when he came into his own as a writer, the afternoon he wrote a short story about his first encounter with death. When he was a boy, he met a young girl at a lake edge and she went out into the water and never came back. Years later, as he wrote about it in "The Lake", tears flowed from him. He recognized he had taken the leap from emulating the many writers he admired to connecting with his voice as a writer.

When later asked about the source of the lyrical power of his prose, he replied: "From reading so much poetry every day of my life. My favorite writers have been those who've said things well." He said: "If you're reluctant to weep, you won't live a full and complete life."

In high school, Bradbury was active in the poetry and drama clubs. Planning to become an actor, he became serious about writing as his high-school years progressed. He graduated from Los Angeles High School, where he took poetry classes with Snow Longley Housh and short-story writing courses taught by Jeannet Johnson. The teachers recognized his talent and furthered his interest in writing, but he did not attend college. Instead, he sold newspapers at the corner of South Norton Avenue and Olympic Boulevard. In regard to his education, Bradbury said:

Libraries raised me. I don't believe in colleges and universities. I believe in libraries because most students don't have any money. When I graduated from high school, it was during the Depression and we had no money. I couldn't go to college, so I went to the library three days a week for 10 years. So I graduated from the library when I was twenty-eight years old.

He told The Paris Review: "You can't learn to write in college. It's a very bad place for writers because the teachers always think they know more than you do—and they don't."

He considered science to be "incidental" to his writing. He claimed not to be interested in the development of science, but hoped to use it as a form of social commentary and as an allegorical technique.

He described his inspiration: "My stories run up and bite me in the leg—I respond by writing them down—everything that goes on during the bite. When I finish, the idea lets go and runs off."

=== "Green Town" ===
An imagined version of Waukegan, Green Town is a symbol of safety and home, which is often the setting for tales of the macabre and the dark fantastic. It serves as the setting of his semiautobiographical classics Dandelion Wine, Something Wicked This Way Comes, and Farewell Summer, as well as many of his short stories. In Green Town, Bradbury's favorite uncle sprouts wings, traveling carnivals conceal supernatural powers, and his grandparents provide room and board to Charles Dickens. Perhaps the definitive use of Green Town is in Summer Morning, Summer Night, a collection of short stories and vignettes exclusively set in the town. Bradbury returns to the signature locale as a look back at the rapidly disappearing small-town world of the American heartland, which was the foundation of his roots.

== Cultural contributions ==
Bradbury wrote many short essays on culture and the arts, attracting the attention of critics in this field, using his fiction to explore and criticize his culture and society. He observed, for example, that Fahrenheit 451 touched on the alienation of people by media:

In writing the short novel Fahrenheit 451 I thought I was describing a world that might evolve in four or five decades. But only a few weeks ago, in Beverly Hills one night, a husband and wife passed me, walking their dog. I stood staring after them, absolutely stunned. The woman held in one hand a small cigarette-package-sized radio, its antenna quivering. From this sprang tiny copper wires which ended in a dainty cone plugged into her right ear. There she was, oblivious to man and dog, listening to far winds and whispers and soap opera cries, sleep walking, helped up and down curbs by a husband who might just as well not have been there. This was not fiction.

Bradbury stated that the novel worked as a critique of the later development of political correctness:

How does the story of Fahrenheit 451 stand up in 1994?
R.B.: It works even better because we have political correctness now. Political correctness is the real enemy these days. The black groups want to control our thinking and you can't say certain things. The homosexual groups don't want you to criticize them. It's thought control and freedom of speech control.

In a 1982 essay, he wrote: "People ask me to predict the Future, when all I want to do is prevent it." This intent had been expressed earlier by other authors, most of whom attributed it to him.

On May 24, 1956, Bradbury appeared on the popular quiz show You Bet Your Life hosted by Groucho Marx. During his introductory comments and on-air banter with Marx, Bradbury briefly discussed some of his books and other works, including giving an overview of "The Veldt", his short story published six years earlier in The Saturday Evening Post under the title "The World the Children Made".

Bradbury was a consultant for the United States Pavilion at the 1964 New York World's Fair and wrote the narration script for The American Journey attraction there. He also worked on the original exhibit in Epcot's Spaceship Earth geosphere at Walt Disney World. He focused on detective fiction in the 1980s. In the latter half of the 1980s and early 1990s, he hosted The Ray Bradbury Theater, a televised anthology series based on his short stories.

Bradbury was a strong supporter of public libraries, raising money to prevent the closure of several libraries in California facing budgetary cuts. He said "libraries raised me", and shunned colleges and universities, comparing his own lack of funds during the Depression with poor contemporary students. His opinion varied on modern technology. In 1985 Bradbury wrote: "I see nothing but good coming from computers. When they first appeared on the scene, people were saying, 'Oh my God, I'm so afraid.' I hate people like that—I call them the neo-Luddites" and: "In a sense, [computers] are simply books. Books are all over the place, and computers will be, too." He resisted the conversion of his work into e-books, saying in 2010: "We have too many cellphones. We've got too many internets. We have got to get rid of those machines. We have too many machines now." When the publishing rights for Fahrenheit 451 came up for renewal in December 2011, Bradbury permitted its publication in electronic form provided that the publisher, Simon & Schuster, allowed the e-book to be digitally downloaded by any library patron. The title remains the only book in the Simon & Schuster catalog for which this is possible.

Several comic-book writers have adapted Bradbury's stories, particularly the authors of EC Comics's line of horror and science-fiction comics. Initially, the writers plagiarized his stories, but a diplomatic letter from Bradbury led to the company's paying him and negotiating properly licensed adaptations of his work. The comics featuring Bradbury's stories included Tales from the Crypt, Weird Science, Weird Fantasy, Crime SuspenStories, and The Haunt of Fear.

Bradbury remained an enthusiastic playwright all his life, leaving a rich theatrical legacy as well as literary. He headed the Pandemonium Theatre Company in Los Angeles for many years, and had a five-year relationship with the Fremont Centre Theatre in South Pasadena.

Bradbury is featured prominently in two documentaries related to his classic 1950s–1960s era: Jason V Brock's Charles Beaumont: The Life of Twilight Zone's Magic Man, detailing his troubles with Rod Serling and his friendships with writers Charles Beaumont, George Clayton Johnson, and most especially his dear friend William F. Nolan; and Brock's The AckerMonster Chronicles!, which delves into the life of former Bradbury agent, close friend, mega-fan and Famous Monsters of Filmland editor Forrest J Ackerman.

Bradbury's legacy was celebrated by the bookstore Fahrenheit 451 Books in Laguna Beach, California, in the 1970s and 1980s. He and his favorite illustrator, Joseph Mugnaini, attended the opening of an addition to the store in the mid-1980s. It closed its doors in 1987, but in 1990, another shop of the same name (with different owners) opened in Carlsbad, California.

In the 1980s and 1990s, Bradbury served on the advisory board of the Los Angeles Student Film Institute.

Bradbury was also the opening-night speaker at the Santa Barbara Writers Conference for well over 30 years, providing inspiration and advice to other writers. He was an integral part of the conference since its beginnings in 1972, and spoke at the first conference in 1973.

== Personal life ==
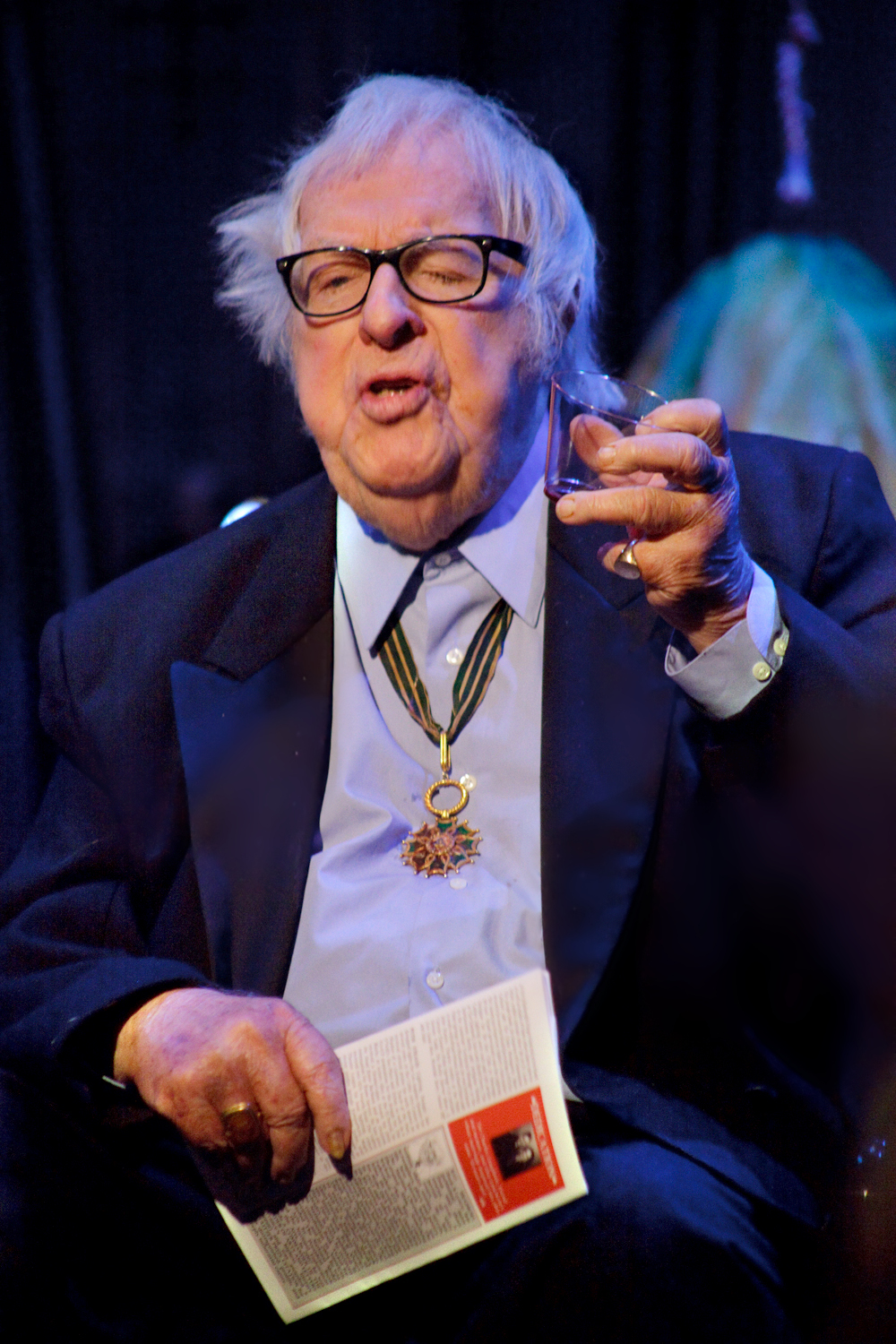
Bradbury in 2009

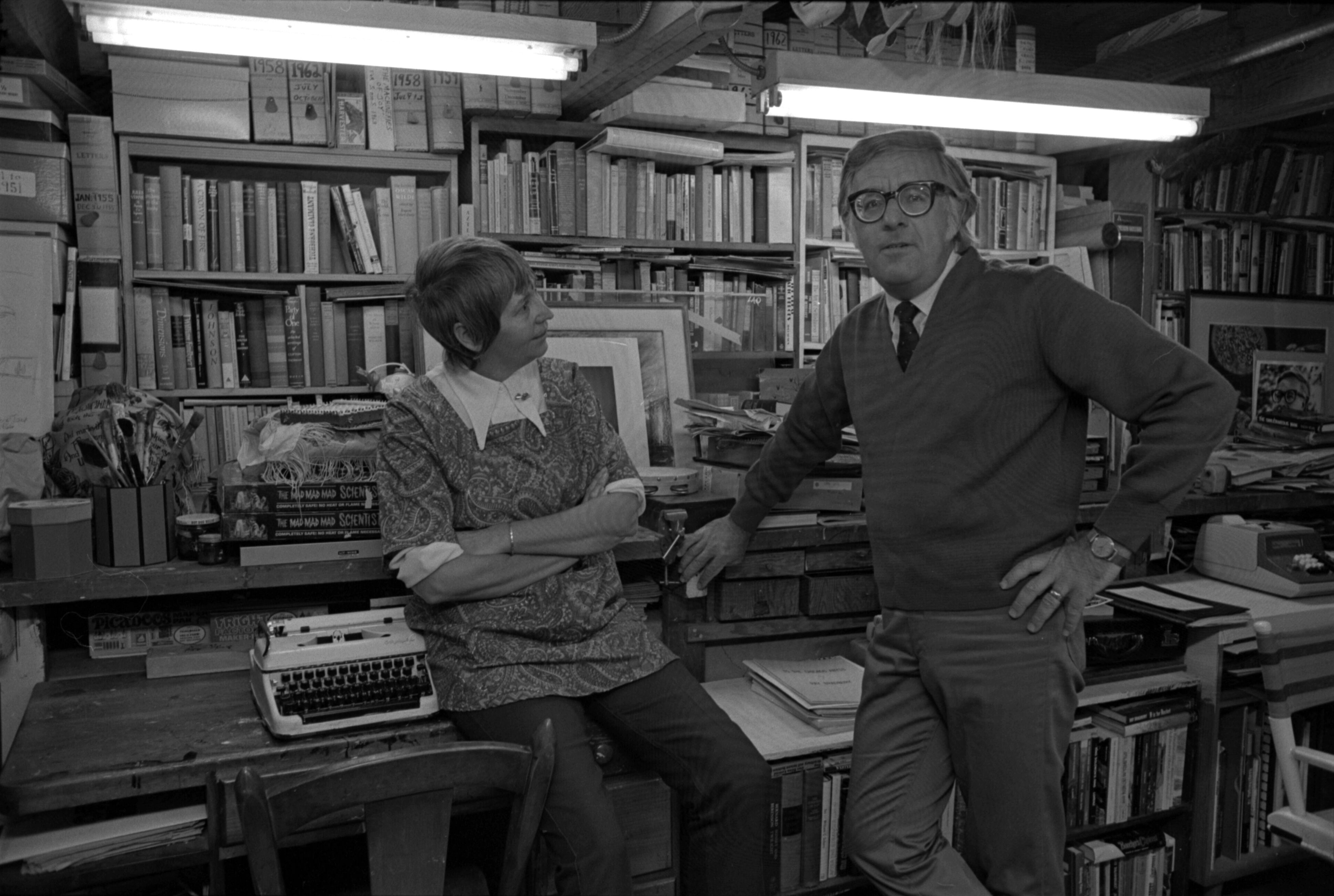
Ray and Maggie Bradbury in their Los Angeles home and Ray's office in 1970. The office is recreated in the Ray Bradbury Center in Indianapolis.

Bradbury lived in his parents' home until, in 1947, at age 27, he married Marguerite McClure (January 16, 1922 – November 24, 2003). They remained married until her death. Maggie, as she was affectionately called, was the only woman he ever dated. They had four daughters: Susan, Ramona, Bettina, and Alexandra. Bradbury never obtained a driver's license, but used public transportation or his bicycle.

He was raised Baptist by his parents, who were infrequent churchgoers. As an adult, Bradbury said he considered himself a "delicatessen religionist" who resisted categorization of his beliefs and took guidance from both Eastern and Western faiths. He felt that his career was "a God-given thing, and I'm so grateful, so, so grateful. The best description of my career as a writer is 'At play in the fields of the Lord'."

Bradbury was a close friend of Charles Addams, and Addams illustrated 1946's "Homecoming", the first of Bradbury's stories about the Elliotts, a family that resembled Addams's own Addams Family, transplanted to rural Illinois. Addams and Bradbury planned a larger collaborative work that would tell the family's complete history, but it never materialized, and according to a 2001 interview, they went their separate ways. In October 2001, Bradbury published all the Family stories he had written in one book with a connecting narrative, From the Dust Returned, featuring a wraparound Addams cover of the original "Homecoming" illustration.

Another of Bradbury's close friends was the special-effects expert Ray Harryhausen, who was best man at Bradbury's wedding. During a BAFTA 2010 awards tribute honoring Harryhausen's 90th birthday, Bradbury spoke about having first met him at Forrest J Ackerman's house when they were both 18. Their shared love for science fiction, King Kong, and The Fountainhead was the beginning of a lifelong friendship. These early influences inspired them to believe in themselves and to affirm their career choices. After their first meeting, they kept in touch at least once a month: their friendship lasted more than 70 years.

Bradbury told of the following encounter with Sergei Bondarchuk, director of the 1966–1967 Soviet epic film War and Peace, at a Hollywood award ceremony in Bondarchuk's honor:

They formed a long queue and as Bondarchuk was walking along it he recognized several people: "Oh Mr. Ford, I like your film." He recognized the director, Greta Garbo, and someone else. I was standing at the very end of the queue and silently watched this. Bondarchuk shouted to me; "Ray Bradbury, is that you?" He rushed up to me, embraced me, dragged me inside, grabbed a bottle of Stolichnaya, sat down at his table where his closest friends were sitting. All the famous Hollywood directors in the queue were bewildered. They stared at me and asked each other "Who is this Bradbury?" And, swearing, they left, leaving me alone with Bondarchuk ...

Late in life, Bradbury retained his dedication and passion despite the "devastation of illnesses and deaths of many good friends". Among them was the death of Star Trek creator Gene Roddenberry, an intimate friend for many years. They remained close for nearly 30 years, after Roddenberry asked him to write for Star Trek; Bradbury declined, claiming that he "never had the ability to adapt other people's ideas into any sensible form".

Bradbury suffered a stroke in 1999 that left him partially dependent on a wheelchair. He made regular appearances at science-fiction conventions until 2009, when he retired from the circuit. He continued to write, contributing an essay to the science-fiction issue of The New Yorker about his inspiration for writing; it was published a week before his death.

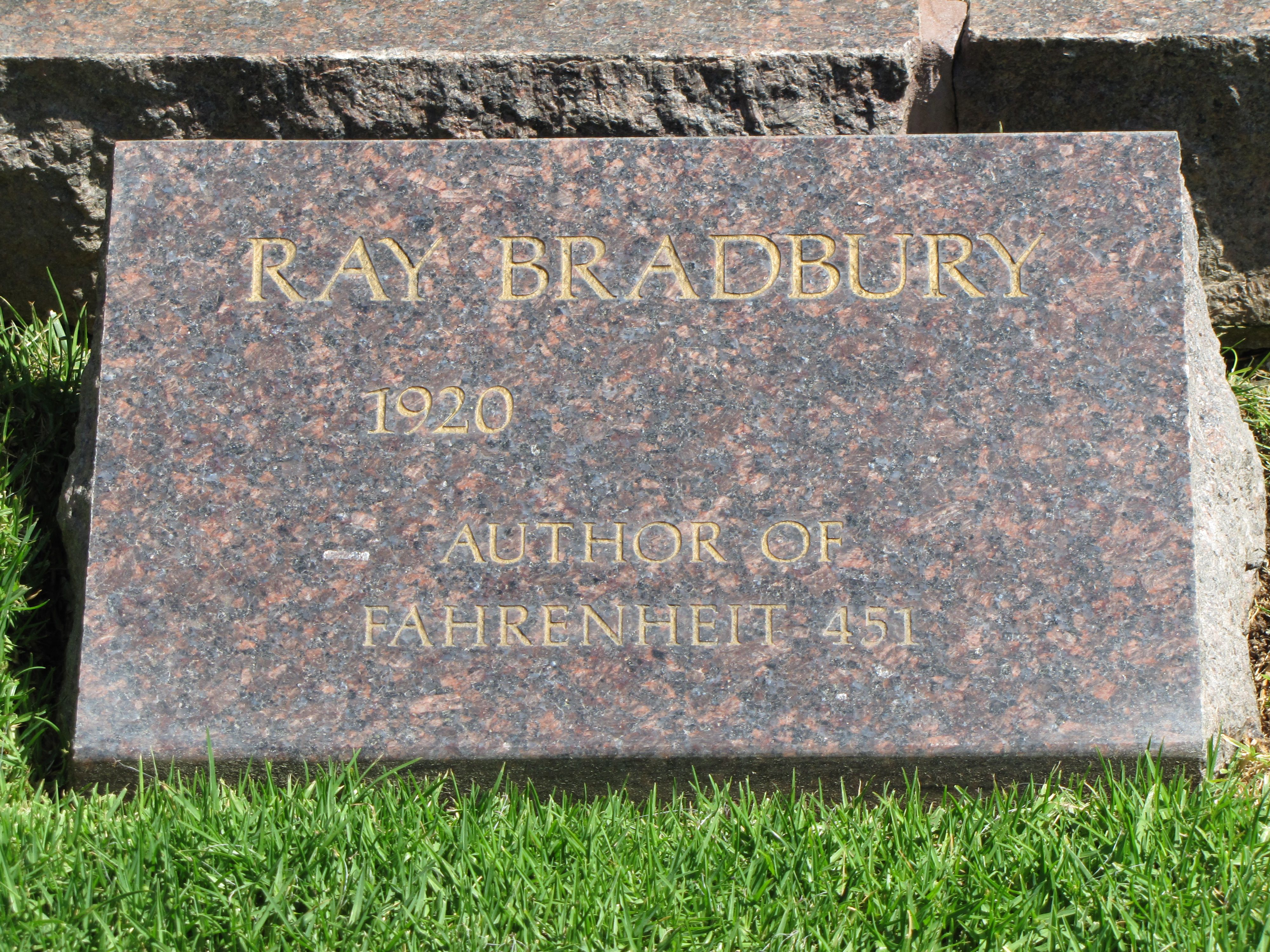
Bradbury's headstone in May 2012, a month before his death

Bradbury chose a burial place at Westwood Village Memorial Park Cemetery in Los Angeles, with a headstone that reads "Author of Fahrenheit 451". On February 6, 2015, The New York Times reported that the house Bradbury had lived and written in for 50 years, at 10265 Cheviot Drive in Cheviot Hills, Los Angeles, California, had been demolished by the buyer, architect Thom Mayne. Bradbury's home office was moved and recreated in the Ray Bradbury Center in Indianapolis.

=== Politics ===
Bradbury considered himself a political independent. Raised a Democrat, he voted for the Democratic Party until 1968. In 1952, he took out an advertisement in Variety as an open letter to Republicans, stating: "Every attempt that you make to identify the Democratic Party as the party of Communism, as the 'left-wing' or 'subversive' party, I will attack with all my heart and soul." However, Lyndon B. Johnson's handling of the Vietnam War left Bradbury disenchanted, and from 1968 on he voted for the Republican Party in every presidential election with the exception of 1976, when he voted for Jimmy Carter. According to Bradbury's biographer Sam Weller, Carter's inept handling of the economy "pushed [Bradbury] permanently away from the Democrats".

Bradbury called Ronald Reagan "the greatest president" whereas he dismissed Bill Clinton, calling him a "shithead". In August 2001, shortly before the September 11 attacks, he described George W. Bush as "wonderful" and stated that the American education system was a "monstrosity". He later criticized Barack Obama for ending NASA's crewed space flight program.

In 2010, he criticized big government, saying that there was "too much government" in America, and "I don't believe in government. I hate politics. I'm against it. And I hope that sometimes this fall, we can destroy part of our government, and next year destroy even more of it. The less government, the happier I will be". Bradbury was against affirmative action, condemned what he called "all this political correctness that's rampant on campuses", and called for a ban of quotas in higher education. He asserted that "education is purely an issue of learning—we can no longer afford to have it polluted by damn politics".

=== Death ===
Bradbury died in Los Angeles, California, on June 5, 2012, at the age of 91, after a lengthy illness. His personal library was willed to the Waukegan Public Library, where he had many of his formative reading experiences.

The Los Angeles Times credited him with the ability "to write lyrically and evocatively of lands an imagination away, worlds he anchored in the here and now with a sense of visual clarity and small-town familiarity". His grandson, Danny Karapetian, said Bradbury's works had "influenced so many artists, writers, teachers, scientists, and it's always really touching and comforting to hear their stories". The Washington Post noted several modern-day technologies that Bradbury had envisioned much earlier, such as the idea of banking ATMs and earbuds and Bluetooth headsets in Fahrenheit 451, and the concepts of artificial intelligence in I Sing the Body Electric.

=== Legacy ===
On June 6, 2012, in an official public statement from the White House Press Office, President Barack Obama said:

For many Americans, the news of Ray Bradbury's death immediately brought to mind images from his work, imprinted in our minds, often from a young age. His gift for storytelling reshaped our culture and expanded our world. But Ray also understood that our imaginations could be used as a tool for better understanding, a vehicle for change, and an expression of our most cherished values. There is no doubt that Ray will continue to inspire many more generations with his writing, and our thoughts and prayers are with his family and friends.

Several authors and filmmakers paid tribute to Bradbury, noting the influence of his works on their own. Steven Spielberg said that Bradbury was "my muse for the better part of my sci-fi career ... On the world of science fiction and fantasy and imagination he is immortal." Neil Gaiman said that "the landscape of the world we live in would have been diminished if we had not had him in our world". Joanne Harris called him "a bright, burning spark." Stephen King released a statement on his website saying:

Ray Bradbury wrote three great novels and three hundred great stories. One of the latter was called "A Sound of Thunder". The sound I hear today is the thunder of a giant's footsteps fading away. But the novels and stories remain, in all their resonance and strange beauty.

Margaret Atwood said she was "warped early by Ray Bradbury." She wrote that Bradbury was:

So much a part of my own early reading, especially the delicious, clandestine reading done avidly in lieu of homework, and the compulsive reading done at night with a flashlight when I ought to have been sleeping. Stories read with such enthusiasm at such a young age are not so much read as inhaled. They sink all the way in and all the way down, and they stay with you... His imagination had a dark side, and he used that dark twin and its nightmares in his work; but to the waking world he presented a combination of eager, wonder-filled boy and kindly uncle, and that was just as real. In an age of writing classes, he was self-taught; in an age of spin, his was an authentic voice, straight from the heartland; in an age of groomed images, he was a natural.

The Ray Bradbury Center was established in 2007 as the Center for Ray Bradbury Studies and received many of Bradbury's papers and artifacts following his death. It continues the work of documenting, preserving, and providing public access to Bradbury's material legacy.

== Works ==
Bradbury authored "more than 27 novels and story collections", which included many of his 600 short stories. More than eight million copies of his works, published in over 36 languages, have been sold around the world.

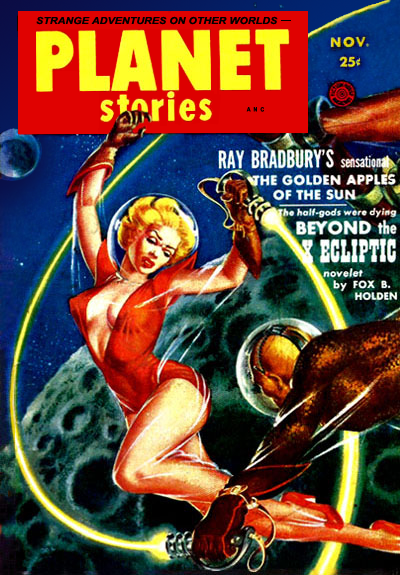
Bradbury's "The Golden Apples of the Sun" was published in the November 1953 issue of Planet Stories.

=== First novel ===
In 1949, Bradbury and his wife were expecting their first child. He took a Greyhound bus to New York and checked into a room at the YMCA for 50 cents a night. He took his short stories to a dozen publishers, but no one wanted them. Just before getting ready to go home, Bradbury had dinner with an editor at Doubleday. When Bradbury recounted that everyone wanted a novel and he did not have one, the editor, coincidentally named Walter Bradbury, asked if the short stories might be tied together into a book-length collection. The title was the editor's idea; he suggested: "You could call it The Martian Chronicles." Bradbury liked the idea and recalled making notes in 1944 to do a book set on Mars. That evening, he stayed up all night at the YMCA and typed out an outline. He took it to the Doubleday editor the next morning, who read it and wrote Bradbury a check for $750. When Bradbury returned to Los Angeles, he connected all the short stories that became The Martian Chronicles.

=== Intended first novel ===
What was later issued as a collection of stories and vignettes, Summer Morning, Summer Night, started out to be Bradbury's first true novel. The core of the work was Bradbury's witnessing of the American small-town life in the American heartland.

In the winter of 1955–56, after a consultation with his Doubleday editor, Bradbury deferred publication of a novel based on Green Town, the pseudonym for his hometown. Instead, he extracted 17 stories and, with three other Green Town tales, bridged them into his 1957 book Dandelion Wine. Later, in 2006, Bradbury published the original novel remaining after the extraction, and retitled it Farewell Summer. These two titles show what stories and episodes Bradbury decided to retain as he created the two books out of one.

The most significant of the remaining unpublished stories, scenes, and fragments were published under the originally intended name for the novel, Summer Morning, Summer Night, in 2007.

== Adaptations to other media ==
From 1950 to 1954, 31 of Bradbury's stories were adapted by Al Feldstein for EC Comics (seven of them uncredited in six stories, including "Kaleidoscope" and "Rocket Man" being combined as "Home To Stay"—for which Bradbury was retroactively paid—and EC's first version of "The Handler" under the title "A Strange Undertaking") and 16 of these were collected in the paperbacks, The Autumn People (1965) and Tomorrow Midnight (1966), both published by Ballantine Books with cover illustrations by Frank Frazetta. Also in the early 1950s, adaptations of Bradbury's stories were televised in several anthology shows, including Tales of Tomorrow, Lights Out, Out There, Suspense, CBS Television Workshop, The Jane Wyman Show, Star Tonight, Windows and Alfred Hitchcock Presents. "The Merry-Go-Round", a half-hour film adaptation of Bradbury's "The Black Ferris", praised by Variety, was shown on Starlight Summer Theater in 1954 and NBC's Sneak Preview in 1956. During that same period, several stories were adapted for radio drama, notably on the science fiction anthologies Dimension X and its successor X Minus One.

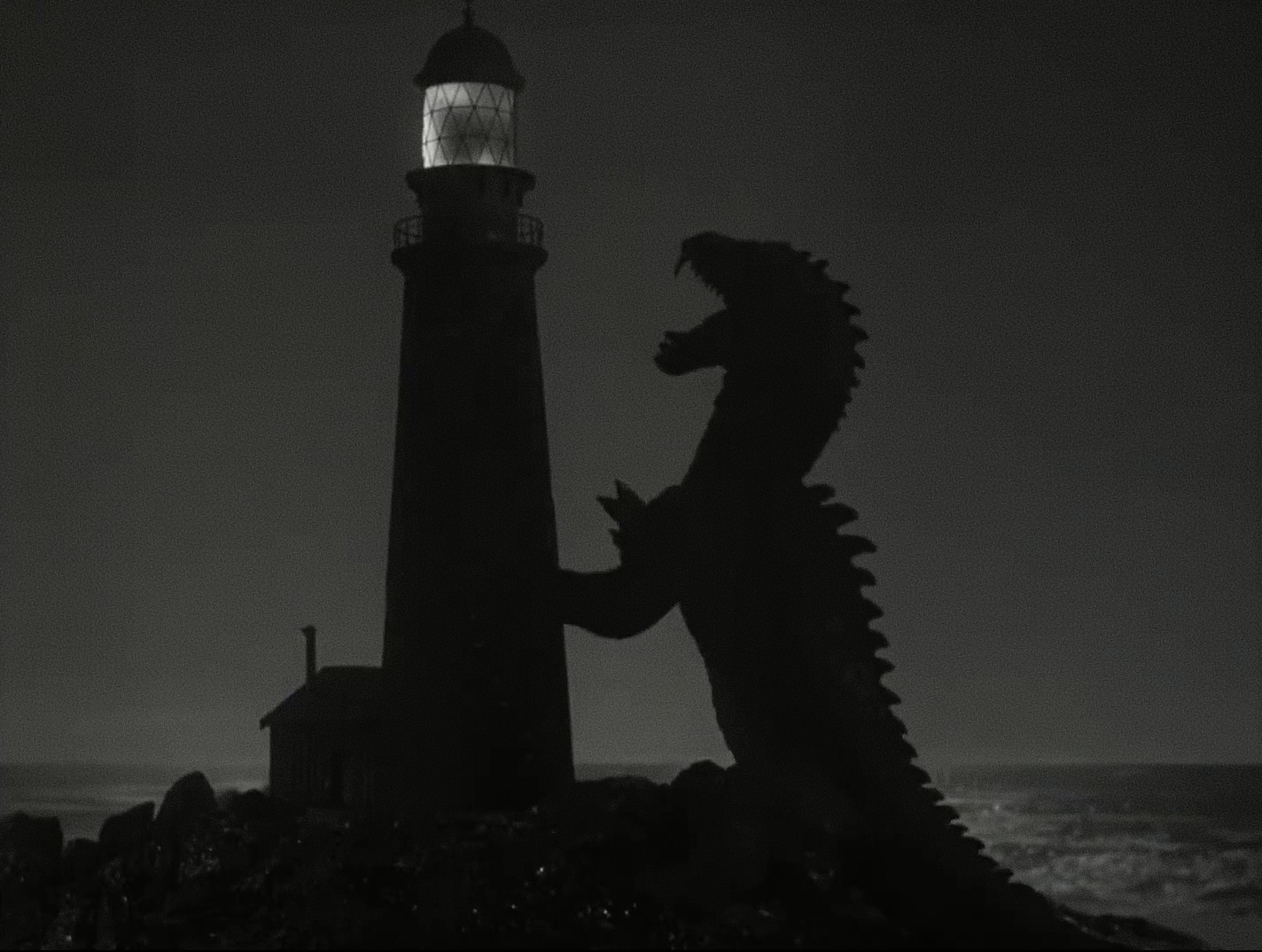
Scene from the 1953 film The Beast from 20,000 Fathoms, based on Bradbury's 1951 short story "The Fog Horn"

Producer William Alland first brought Bradbury to movie theaters in 1953 with It Came from Outer Space, a Harry Essex screenplay developed from Bradbury's screen treatment "Atomic Monster". Three weeks later came the release of Eugène Lourié's The Beast from 20,000 Fathoms (1953), which featured one scene based on Bradbury's "The Fog Horn", about a sea monster mistaking the sound of a fog horn for the mating cry of a female. Bradbury's close friend Ray Harryhausen produced the stop-motion animation of the creature. Bradbury later returned the favor by writing a short story "Tyrannosaurus Rex" about a stop-motion animator who strongly resembled Harryhausen. Over the next 50 years, more than 35 features, shorts, and TV movies were based on Bradbury's stories or screenplays. Bradbury was hired in 1953 by director John Huston to work on the screenplay for his film version of Melville's Moby Dick (1956), which stars Gregory Peck as Captain Ahab, Richard Basehart as Ishmael, and Orson Welles as Father Mapple. A significant result of the film was Bradbury's book Green Shadows, White Whale, a semifictionalized account of the making of the film, including Bradbury's dealings with Huston and his time in Ireland, where exterior scenes that were set in New Bedford, Massachusetts, were filmed.

Bradbury's short story "I Sing the Body Electric" (from the book of the same name) was adapted for the 100th episode of The Twilight Zone. The episode was first aired on May 18, 1962.

Bradbury and director Charles Rome Smith co-founded the Pandemonium Theatre Company in 1964. Its first production was The World of Ray Bradbury, consisting of one-act adaptations of "The Pedestrian", "The Veldt", and "To the Chicago Abyss". It ran for four months at the Coronet Theatre in Los Angeles (October 1964 – February 1965); an off-Broadway production was presented in October 1965. Another Pandemonium Theatre Company production was mounted at the Coronet Theatre in 1965, again presenting adaptations of three Bradbury short stories: "The Wonderful Ice Cream Suit", "The Day It Rained Forever", and "Device Out of Time". (The last was adapted from his 1957 novel Dandelion Wine). The original cast for this production featured Booth Coleman, Joby Baker, Fredric Villani, Arnold Lessing, Eddie Sallia, Keith Taylor, Richard Bull, Gene Otis Shane, Henry T. Delgado, F. Murray Abraham, Anne Loos, and Len Lesser. The director, again, was Charles Rome Smith.

Oskar Werner and Julie Christie starred in Fahrenheit 451 (1966), an adaptation of Bradbury's novel directed by François Truffaut.

In 1966, Bradbury helped Lynn Garrison create AVIAN, a specialist aviation magazine. For the first issue, Bradbury wrote a poem "Planes That Land on Grass".

In 1968 the BBC Third Programme broadcast Leviathan 99, a lyrical and poetic transposition of Moby Dick into outer space. It starred Denys Hawthorne and Christopher Lee, and electronic mustic was provided by Tristam Carey.

In 1969, The Illustrated Man was brought to the big screen, starring Rod Steiger, Claire Bloom, and Robert Drivas. Containing the prologue and three short stories from the book, the film received mediocre reviews. The same year, Bradbury approached composer Jerry Goldsmith, who had worked with Bradbury in dramatic radio of the 1950s and later scored the film version, to compose a cantata Christus Apollo based on Bradbury's text. The work premiered in late 1969, with the California Chamber Symphony performing with narrator Charlton Heston at UCLA.

Something Wicked This Way Comes was adapted for a low-budget 1972 British film, produced by the Forest Hill Film Unit & Drama Troupe and directed by Colin Finbow.

Ray Bradbury takes part in a symposium at Caltech with Arthur C. Clarke, journalist Walter Sullivan, and scientists Carl Sagan and Bruce Murray. In this excerpt, Bradbury reads his poem 'If Only We Had Taller Been' (poem begins at 2:20, full text). Video released by NASA in honor of the naming of Bradbury Landing in 2012.

In 1972, The Screaming Woman was adapted as an ABC Movie-of-the-Week starring Olivia de Havilland.

The Martian Chronicles became a three-part TV miniseries starring Rock Hudson, which was first broadcast by NBC in 1980. Bradbury found the miniseries "just boring".

The 1982 television movie The Electric Grandmother was based on Bradbury's short story "I Sing the Body Electric".

The 1983 horror film Something Wicked This Way Comes, starring Jason Robards and Jonathan Pryce, is based on the Bradbury novel of the same name.

In 1984, Michael McDonough of Brigham Young University produced Bradbury 13, a series of 13 audio adaptations of famous stories from Bradbury, in conjunction with National Public Radio. The full-cast dramatizations featured adaptations of "The Ravine", "Night Call, Collect", "The Veldt", "There Was an Old Woman", "Kaleidoscope", "Dark They Were, and Golden-Eyed", "The Screaming Woman", "A Sound of Thunder", "The Man", "The Wind", "The Fox and the Forest", "Here There Be Tygers", and "The Happiness Machine". Voiceover actor Paul Frees provided narration, while Bradbury was responsible for the opening voiceover; Greg Hansen and Roger Hoffman scored the episodes. The series won a Peabody Award and two Gold Cindy awards and was released on CD on May 1, 2010. The series began airing on BBC Radio 4 Extra on June 12, 2011. Also in 1984, the short story Frost and Fire was adapted into a 30-minutes short called Quest, directed by Saul and Elaine Bass.

From 1985 to 1992, Bradbury hosted a syndicated anthology television series, The Ray Bradbury Theater, for which he adapted 65 of his stories. Each episode began with a shot of Bradbury in his office, gazing over mementoes of his life, which he states (in narrative) are used to spark ideas for stories. After the first two seasons, Bradbury also provided additional voiceover narration specific to the featured story.

Deeply respected in the USSR, Bradbury's fiction has been adapted into six episodes of the Soviet science-fiction TV series This Fantastic World which adapted the stories film version of "Forever and the Earth", "I Sing The Body Electric", "The Smile", Fahrenheit 451, "A Piece of Wood", and "To the Chicago Abyss". In 1984 a cartoon adaptation of "There Will Come Soft Rains" («Будет ласковый дождь») came out by Uzbek director Nazim Tulyakhodzhayev. He made a film adaptation of "The Veldt" in 1987. In 1985, film adaptation of "I Sing The Body Electric" («Электронная бабушка») came out by Lithuanian director Algimantas Puipa. In 1989, a cartoon adaptation of "Here There Be Tygers" («Здесь могут водиться тигры») by director Vladimir Samsonov came out. In 1993, "The Smile" has been adapted as Viktor Chaika's music video "Mona Lisa" which included footage from Soviet TV series This Fantastic World.

Bradbury wrote and narrated the 1993 animated television version of The Halloween Tree, based on his 1972 novel.

The 1998 film The Wonderful Ice Cream Suit, released by Touchstone Pictures, was written by Bradbury. It was based on his story "The Magic White Suit" originally published in The Saturday Evening Post in 1957. The story had also previously been adapted as a play, a musical, and a 1958 television version.

In 2002, Bradbury's own Pandemonium Theatre Company production of Fahrenheit 451 at Burbank's Falcon Theatre combined live acting with projected digital animation by the Pixel Pups. In 1984, Telarium released a game for Commodore 64 based on Fahrenheit 451.

In 2005, the film A Sound of Thunder was released, loosely based upon the short story of the same name. The film The Butterfly Effect revolves around the same theory as A Sound of Thunder and contains many references to its inspiration. Short film adaptations of A Piece of Wood and The Small Assassin were released in 2005 and 2007, respectively.

In 2005, it was reported that Bradbury was upset with filmmaker Michael Moore for using the title Fahrenheit 9/11, which is an allusion to Bradbury's Fahrenheit 451, for his documentary about the George W. Bush administration. Bradbury expressed displeasure with Moore's use of the title, but stated that his resentment was not politically motivated, though Bradbury was conservative-leaning politically. Bradbury asserted that he did not want any of the money made by the movie, nor did he believe that he deserved it. He pressured Moore to change the name, but to no avail. Moore called Bradbury two weeks before the film's release to apologize, saying that the film's marketing had been set in motion a long time ago and it was too late to change the title.

In 2008, the film Ray Bradbury's Chrysalis was produced by Roger Lay Jr. for Urban Archipelago Films, based upon the short story of the same name. The film won the best feature award at the International Horror and Sci-Fi Film Festival in Phoenix. The film has international distribution by Arsenal Pictures and domestic distribution by Lightning Entertainment.

In 2010, The Martian Chronicles was adapted for radio by Colonial Radio Theatre on the Air.

Bradbury's works and approach to writing are documented in Terry Sanders's film Ray Bradbury: Story of a Writer (1963).

Bradbury's poem "Groon" was voiced as a tribute in 2012.

Bradbury's story "Pendulum" was adapted into the second episode of the science fiction podcast DUST (2019).

== Awards and honors ==
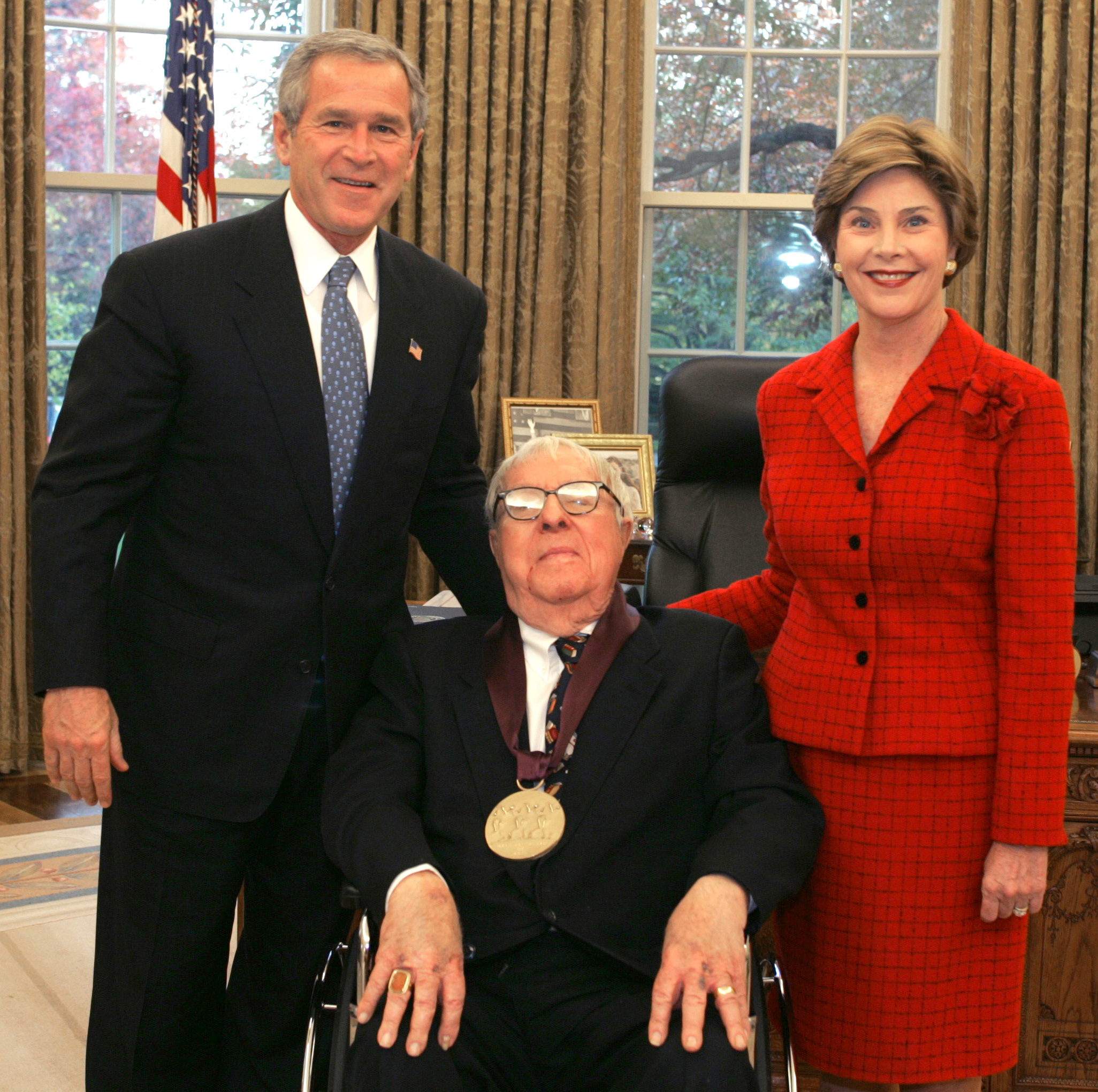
Bradbury receiving the National Medal of Arts in 2004 with President George W. Bush and First Lady Laura Bush

The Ray Bradbury Award for excellency in screenwriting was occasionally presented by the Science Fiction and Fantasy Writers of America – presented to six people on four occasions from 1992 to 2009. Beginning 2010, the Ray Bradbury Award for Outstanding Dramatic Presentation is presented annually according to Nebula Awards rules and procedures, although it is not a Nebula Award. The revamped Bradbury Award replaced the Nebula Award for Best Script.

- In 1971, an impact crater on the Moon was named Dandelion by the Apollo 15 astronauts, in honor of Bradbury's 1957 novel Dandelion Wine.
- In 1979, he was awarded an honorary Doctor of Letters (Litt.D.) degree from Whittier College.
- In 1984, he received the Prometheus Award for Fahrenheit 451.
- In 1986, Ray Bradbury was a Guest of Honor at the 44th World Science Fiction Convention, which was held in Atlanta, Ga., from August 28 to September 1.
- Ray Bradbury Park was dedicated in Waukegan, Illinois, in 1990. He was present for the ribbon-cutting ceremony. The park contains locations described in Dandelion Wine, most notably the "113 steps". In 2009, a panel designed by artist Michael Pavelich was added to the park detailing the history of Ray Bradbury and Ray Bradbury Park.
- An asteroid discovered in 1992 was named "9766 Bradbury" in his honor.
- In 1994, he received the Peggy V. Helmerich Distinguished Author Award, presented annually by the Tulsa Library Trust.
- In 1994, he won an Emmy Award for the screenplay The Halloween Tree.
- In 2000, he was awarded the Medal for Distinguished Contribution to American Letters from the National Book Foundation.
- For his contribution to the motion picture industry, Bradbury was given a star on the Hollywood Walk of Fame on April 1, 2002.
- In 2003, he received an honorary doctorate from Woodbury University, where he presented the Ray Bradbury Creativity Award each year until his death.
- On November 17, 2004, Bradbury received the National Medal of Arts, presented by President George W. Bush and Laura Bush.
- Retro Hugo Award: He was awarded a Retro Hugo Award for Best Novel for Fahrenheit 451 in 2004.
- Bradbury received a World Fantasy Award for Life Achievement at the 1977 World Fantasy Convention and was named Gandalf Grand Master of Fantasy at the 1980 World Science Fiction Convention. In 1989 the Horror Writers Association gave him the fourth or fifth Bram Stoker Award for Lifetime Achievement in horror fiction and the Science Fiction Writers of America made him its 10th SFWA Grand Master. He won a First Fandom Hall of Fame Award in 1996, was given the Los Angeles Times Book Prize Robert Kirsch Award winner in 1997, the Science Fiction and Fantasy Hall of Fame inducted him in 1999, its fourth class of two deceased and two living writers. In 2000, he received the National Book Award Medal for Distinguished Contribution.
- In 2005, he was awarded the degree of Doctor of Laws (honoris causa) by the National University of Ireland, Galway, at a conferring ceremony in Los Angeles.
- On April 14, 2007, Bradbury received the Sir Arthur Clarke Award's Special Award, given by Clarke to a recipient of his choice.
- On April 16, 2007, Bradbury received a special citation by the Pulitzer Prize jury "for his distinguished, prolific, and deeply influential career as an unmatched author of science fiction and fantasy".
- In 2007, Bradbury was made a Commandeur (Commander) of the Ordre des Arts et des Lettres (Order of the Arts and Letters) by the French government.
- In 2008, he was named SFPA Grandmaster.
- On May 17, 2008, Bradbury received the inaugural J. Lloyd Eaton Lifetime Achievement Award in Science Fiction, presented by the UCR Libraries at the 2008 Eaton Science Fiction Conference, "Chronicling Mars".
- On November 19, 2008, Bradbury was presented with the Illinois Literary Heritage Award by the Illinois Center for the Book.
- In 2009, Bradbury was awarded an Honorary Doctorate by Columbia College Chicago.
- In 2010, Spike TV Scream Awards Comic-Con Icon Award went to Bradbury
- In 2012, the NASA Curiosity rover landing site (4.5895°S 137.4417°E) on the planet Mars was named "Bradbury Landing".
- On December 6, 2012, the Los Angeles street corner at 5th and Flower Streets was named "Ray Bradbury Square" in his honor.
- On February 24, 2013, Bradbury was honored at the 85th Academy Awards during that event's "In Memoriam" segment.
- In 2020, the Library of America published a collection of his early works, and his works are consistently included in curricula in schools worldwide.
- In 2025, the instrumental concept album The Ray Bradbury Chronicles was based on ten classic stories and novels by Ray Bradbury, each track conveying musically the story & mood of the work it was inspired by.

== Documentaries ==
- The Fantasy Film Worlds of George Pal (1985), produced and directed by Arnold Leibovit, Bradbury appeared in the documentary.
- Bradbury, Ray (January 17, 1968). "Ray Bradbury speaking at UCLA". University of California, Los Angeles Communications Studies Department – via YouTube.
- Interview with Ray Bradbury (1979) at California State University, Northridge

== General and cited sources ==
- Anderson, James Arthur (2013). The Illustrated Ray Bradbury. Wildside Press. ISBN 978-1-4794-0007-2.
- Albright, Donn (1990). Bradbury Bits & Pieces: The Ray Bradbury Bibliography, 1974–88. Starmont House. ISBN 978-1-55742-151-7.
- Eller, Jonathan R.; Touponce, William F. (2004). Ray Bradbury: The Life of Fiction. Kent State University Press. ISBN 978-0-87338-779-8.
- Eller, Jonathan R. (2011). Becoming Ray Bradbury. Urbana, IL: University of Illinois Press. ISBN 978-0-252-03629-3.
- Nolan, William F. (1975). The Ray Bradbury Companion: A Life and Career History, Photolog, and Comprehensive Checklist of Writings. Gale Research. ISBN 978-0-8103-0930-2.
- Paradowski, Robert J.; Rhynes, Martha E. (2001). Ray Bradbury. Salem Press.
- Reid, Robin Anne (2000). Ray Bradbury: A Critical Companion. Greenwood Press. ISBN 978-0-313-30901-4.
- Tuck, Donald H. (1974). The Encyclopedia of Science Fiction and Fantasy. Chicago: Advent. pp. 61–63. ISBN 978-0-911682-20-5.
- Weist, Jerry (2002). Bradbury, an Illustrated Life: A Journey to Far Metaphor. William Morrow and Company. ISBN 978-0-06-001182-6.
- Weller, Sam (2005). The Bradbury Chronicles: The Life of Ray Bradbury. HarperCollins. ISBN 978-0-06-054581-9.
