= Dandelion Wine =

1957 novel by Ray Bradbury

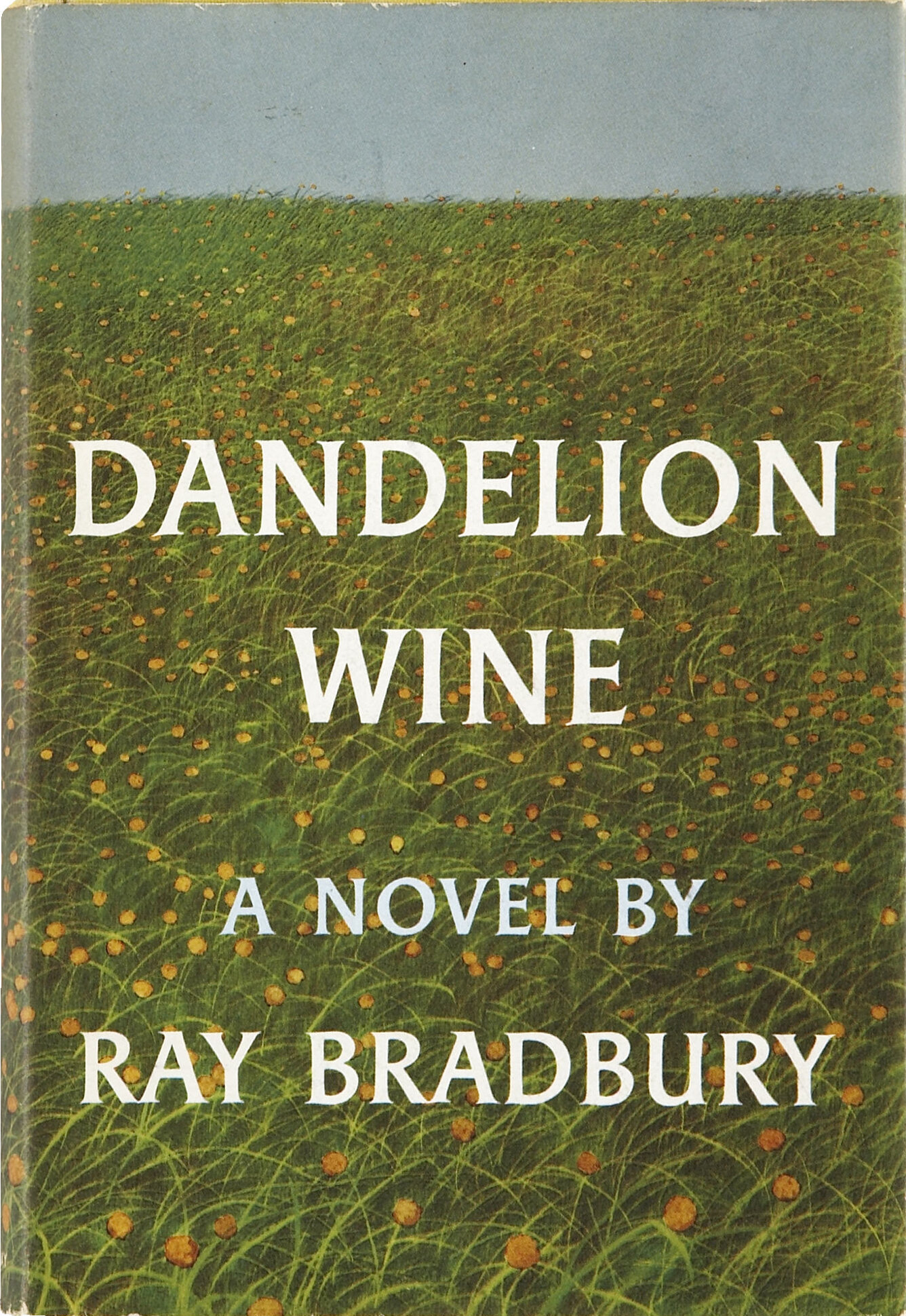
- Dust-jacket from the first edition
- Author: Ray Bradbury
- Language: English
- Publisher: Doubleday
- Publication date: 1957
- Publication place: United States
- Media type: Print (Hardback & Paperback)
- Pages: 281
- ISBN: 0-553-27753-7 (reprint)
- OCLC: 18280204
- Followed by: Farewell Summer

Dandelion Wine is a 1957 novel by American writer Ray Bradbury, set in the summer of 1928 in the fictional town of Green Town, Illinois, based upon Bradbury's childhood home of Waukegan, Illinois. The first novel in his Green Town Trilogy, the book developed from the short story "Dandelion Wine", which appeared in the June 1953 issue of Gourmet magazine.

The title refers to a wine made with dandelion petals and other ingredients, commonly citrus fruit. In the story, dandelion wine, as made daily by the protagonist's grandfather, serves as a metaphor for distilling all of the joys of summer.

The main character of the story is Douglas Spaulding, a 12-year-old boy loosely patterned after Bradbury. Most of the book is focused upon the routines of small-town America, and the simple joys of yesterday.

== Background and origins ==
Bradbury noted in "Just This Side of Byzantium", a 1974 essay used as an introduction to the book, that Dandelion Wine is a recreation of a boy's childhood, based upon an intertwining of Bradbury's own experiences and imagination.

Farewell Summer, the official sequel to Dandelion Wine, was published in October 2006. While Farewell Summer is a direct continuation of the plot of Dandelion Wine, Something Wicked This Way Comes, a novel with a completely different plot and characters, is often paired with the latter because of their stylistic and thematic similarities. Together, the three novels form a Green Town trilogy. A fourth volume, Summer Morning, Summer Night, published in 2008, contains twenty-seven Green Town stories and vignettes, seventeen published for the first time.

== Plot introduction ==
Dandelion Wine is composed of a series of short stories loosely connected to summer occurrences, with Douglas and his family as recurring characters. Many of the chapters were first published as individual short stories, the earliest being "The Night" (1946), with the remainder appearing between 1950 and 1957.

== Main characters ==
Douglas Spaulding: The protagonist of the novel, the entire summer is seen mostly through his eyes as a time of joys and sorrows. Douglas is imaginative, fanciful, and occasionally meditative on the state of the world. Most of the time, he aims to have fun as a 12-year-old kid, but sometimes he lapses into philosophical brooding on topics, including life and death, more mature topics than what would be expected of his age. Bradbury has stated that Douglas is based on the childhood version of him, and in fact, "Douglas" is Bradbury's actual middle name, while "Spaulding" is his father's middle name.

Tom Spaulding: Douglas' younger brother, Tom is the more logical and skeptical one, often questioning his brother's seemingly inexplicable actions. Tom is also somewhat more childish and naïve than Douglas, often failing to understand the seriousness of Douglas' thoughts about his life; nonetheless, he often acts as the voice of reason when Douglas' imagination gets the better of him.

Charlie: A friend of Douglas and Tom, Charlie often hangs around with them. Charlie sometimes comments on a situation or on the behavior of other characters. Other than that, he gets little character development and acts as more of a side character for Douglas and Tom's adventures.

== Critical reception ==
Some critics consider Dandelion Wine to be Bradbury's most personal work. According to Electric Literature, "The book is Bradbury’s masterpiece, his fullest, most deeply felt and lyrical expression, touching on his usual themes of youth, old age and small-town life but stripped of their usual layer of sci-fi remove." Georges D. Todds of the SF Site said that the novel's power lies in the "emotional attachment" it stirs in readers, because it is almost completely nostalgia in contrast to Bradbury's usual blend of horror/science fiction and nostalgia. He stated that this trait was what set it apart from his other works:

Certainly I would tell anyone wanting to know what makes Ray Bradbury the human being he is to read Dandelion Wine, and anyone wanting to know what makes Ray Bradbury the renowned writer he is to read The October Country or The Martian Chronicles.

The novel's heavy reliance on poetical imagery has produced mixed criticism. Many critics say that these are the novel's greatest strengths because the tone matches the spirit of Bradbury's memories and optimistic outlook. John Zuck classified it as "spiritual fiction", paying particular attention to the religious theme of holding on to ephemeral beauty, i.e., the short-lived summer. Floyd C. Gale wrote that "Admirers of Bradbury will welcome this tender volume and even his decriers will find passages of pure evocative magic to soften their flinty hearts".

Other critics, however, label this style as overwrought and too "feel-good". Alan David Price stated that while "Bradbury is at his most effective when evoking a New World joy and optimism", there are times when his prose becomes overly sentimental and his "gently fantastic style becomes plain tiring". He nonetheless classifies Dandelion Wine as "an engrossing read".

The critic and author Damon Knight was also downbeat:

Childhood is Bradbury's one subject, but you will not find real childhood here, Bradbury's least of all. What he has had to say about it has always been expressed obliquely, in symbol and allusion, and always with the tension of the outsider—the ex-child, the lonely one. In giving up this tension, in diving with arms spread into the glutinous pool of sentimentality that has always been waiting for him, Bradbury has renounced the one thing that made him worth reading.

Knight remarks further that "The period is as vague as the place; Bradbury calls it 1928, but it has no feeling of genuine recollection; most of the time it is like second-hand 1910."

Author R.L. Stine calls Dandelion Wine one of his favorite books, saying: "It is enchanting[...]. I read it once a year to remember what good writing is all about". He describes it as the "most underrated book of all-time" and "a reminiscence of a time and place that probably never existed. Every page has startling beauty..”

== Sequel ==
Farewell Summer, published in 2006, is Bradbury's sequel to Dandelion Wine.

== Film, television, theatrical and radio adaptations ==
The first stage adaptation of Dandelion Wine was a 1975 production in New York City arranged and adapted by Peter John Bailey, directed by William Woodman, and starring Matthew Anton and Doug McKeon. It was produced by The New Phoenix Repertory Company, under the artistic direction of Stephen Porter and Harold Prince. The production was reviewed by Mel Gussow of the New York Times on February 8, 1975.

Bradbury co-wrote a musical of Dandelion Wine in 1988 with Jimmy Webb. It was workshopped at the University of Tulsa and directed by Dr. Nancy Vunovich in 1989. Webb and Bradbury were in attendance.

A stage production was done in 1992 in Manistee Michigan. Ray Bradbury was present at the Ramsdell theater for the opening night.

The novel was also made into a 1997 Russian film adaptation, titled Vino iz oduvanchikov. Currently, there is no English film adaptation available for the book.

Dandelion Wine was produced as a full-cast radio play by the Colonial Radio Theatre on the Air, in 2006. Ray Bradbury wrote the script from his stage play, and the production was released by Blackstone Audio. The cast included Jerry Robbins as Bill Forrester, William Humphrey as Douglas Spaulding, Rik Pierce as Grandpa, and James McLean as Tom Spaulding. The production was directed by Nancy Curran Willis, with music by Jeffrey Gage, and was produced by Jerry Robbins.

After hearing the production, Ray Bradbury sent a letter to producer Jerry Robbins: "I've just played for the second time your production of Dandelion Wine and it's fabulous. I'm so very proud of it. In fact, it made me weep. In your own way you've told me that I have a chance of part of me living beyond the day that I leave this earth. This production is simply incredible." Phil Nichols of www.Bradburymedia.co.uk said of this recording, "The audio production is extravagant, and benefits from some strong performances and an extensive musical score...one of the most lively and energetic Bradbury productions for many years." The production won the Ogle Award for best Fantasy Production of 2006.

In August 2011, Hollywood producers Mike Medavoy and Doug McKay of Phoenix Pictures announced a new American feature adaptation of Dandelion Wine, destined for release in 2012 or 2013. Bradbury, RGI Productions' husband and wife team Rodion Nahapetov and Natasha Shliapnikoff are working with Medavoy and McKay to produce the adaptation, with Nahapetov penning the script.

In 2011, BBC Radio 4 Extra broadcast an adaptation of Bradbury's novel. This was repeated annually until at least 2014.

== In popular culture ==
- In 1971, the Apollo 15 astronauts named a Moon crater "Dandelion" to honor Bradbury's novel.
- "Dandelion Wine", a song from Blackmore's Night's 2003 album Ghost of a Rose, is named after the novel and shares with it the theme of childhood memories in the summer.
- In the 2014 horror adventure game The Vanishing of Ethan Carter, the protagonist's name is shown on the cover of a fictional science fiction magazine as the featured author of a story set on Mars, a reference to author Ray Bradbury's 1950 book The Martian Chronicles. The game contains a theme of a child's imagination much like Dandelion Wine.
- Gregory Alan Isakov's song "Dandelion Wine" is named after the novel.
- The book is shown in the 2015 film The Age of Adaline.

== See also ==
- Experience machine, similar to the Happiness Machine

== General and cited references ==
- "Library of Congress Online Catalog".
- Reid, Robin Anne (2000). Ray Bradbury: A Critical Companion. Greenwood Press.
- "Dandelion Wine: Study Guide". SparkNotes. Archived from the original on April 19, 2021.

https://tulsaworld.com/archive/dandelion-wine-to-open-thursday-composer-jimmy-webb-writer-ray-bradbury-to-attend/article_2ee45a95-58d5-5daa-a080-e22a70080316.html
