= The Halloween Tree =

1972 novel by Ray Bradbury

- First edition
- Author: Ray Bradbury
- Illustrator: Joseph Mugnaini; Gris Grimly (2015 edition)
- Language: English
- Genre: Fantasy
- Publisher: Alfred A. Knopf
- Publication date: 1972
- Publication place: United States
- Media type: Print (hardcover and paperback)
- Pages: 160 pp
- ISBN: 0-375-80301-7
- OCLC: 42303883

The Halloween Tree is a 1972 fantasy novel by American author Ray Bradbury, which traces the history of Samhain and Halloween. The novel was adapted as a 1993 film, and an annual Halloween Tree has been exhibited at Disneyland in California since 2007.

== Plot summary ==
A group of eight boys set out to go trick-or-treating on Halloween, only to discover that a ninth friend, Pipkin, has been whisked away on a journey that could determine whether he lives or dies. Through the help of a mysterious character named Carapace Clavicle Moundshroud, they pursue their friend across time and space through ancient Egyptian, ancient Greek, and ancient Roman cultures, Celtic druidism, the Notre-Dame Cathedral in medieval Paris, and the Day of the Dead in Mexico. Along the way, they learn the origins of the holiday that they celebrate, and the role that the fear of death, ghosts, and the haunts has played in shaping civilization. The Halloween Tree itself, with its many branches laden with jack-o'-lanterns, serves as a metaphor for the historical confluence of these traditions.

== Background ==
The novel originated in 1967 as the screenplay for an unproduced collaboration with animator Chuck Jones. Bradbury later wrote and narrated Hanna-Barbera's 1993 feature-length animated version of the novel for television, for which he won an Emmy Award. A longer 2005 limited edition of the novel was compiled and edited by Donn Albright. This edition also included both the 1967 and 1993 screenplays.

Bradbury dedicated The Halloween Tree to Man'ha Garreau-Dombasle (1898–1999), a French writer and translator who was the maternal grandmother of the actress and singer Arielle Dombasle and the wife of Maurice Garreau-Dombasle, a French ambassador to Mexico.

== Illustrations ==
The Halloween Tree is illustrated by Joseph Mugnaini, one of Bradbury's many collaborators over the years. Mugnaini illustrated many novels with Bradbury, and Bradbury owned many examples of Mugnaini's artwork.

In 2015, three years after Bradbury's death, an alternative edition featuring the illustrations of Gris Grimly was produced.

== Adaptations ==
- Bradbury wrote the script for the 1993 film The Halloween Tree based upon the book. The script won the 1994 Emmy Award for Outstanding Writing in an Animated Program.
- A film adaptation of the book is in development at Warner Bros. with Will Dunn screenwriting and Charlie Morrison overseeing the project.

== Disneyland ==
On October 31, 2007, Bradbury attended the presentation of a Halloween Tree at Disneyland in California, to be included as part of its annual park-wide Halloween decorations every year. Halloween trees have also become a fixture of the Disney Cruise Line's Halloween celebrations.

== See also ==
- Bibliography of Halloween
