= Classic Stories 1 =

Collection of short stories by Ray Bradbury

- cover of first edition
- Author: Ray Bradbury
- Cover artist: Barclay Shaw
- Language: English
- Genre: Science fiction, fantasy, horror
- Publisher: Bantam Books
- Publication date: 1990
- Publication place: United States
- Media type: Print (paperback)
- Pages: 342
- ISBN: 0-553-28637-4
- OCLC: 21507483

Classic Stories 1: From The Golden Apples of the Sun and R is for Rocket is a semi-omnibus edition of two short story collections by Ray Bradbury: The Golden Apples of the Sun (1953) and R is for Rocket (1962).

The first 18 stories (17 prior to the third-printing's addition of the story "The Golden Apples of the Sun") are assimilated from the original Doubleday edition of The Golden Apples of the Sun. The stories appear in the original sequence, but with three omissions: "The Pedestrian" (1951), "Invisible Boy" (1945), and "Hail and Farewell" (1953). The final 14 stories in the collection are reproduced from R is for Rocket. Omitted are "The Gift" (1952) and two stories already present in The Golden Apples of the Sun.

When Avon Books reprinted the book in 1997, they retitled it The Golden Apples of the Sun and Other Stories. Harper Perennial titled their 2005 edition as A Sound of Thunder and Other Stories.

== Contents ==
1. "The Fog Horn" (1952)
2. "The April Witch" (1951)
3. "The Wilderness" (1952)
4. "The Fruit at the Bottom of the Bowl" (1948)
5. "The Flying Machine" (1953)
6. "The Murderer" (1953)
7. "The Golden Kite, the Silver Wind" (1953)
8. "I See You Never" (1947)
9. "Embroidery" (1951)
10. "The Big Black and White Game" (1945)
11. "The Great Wide World Over There" (1953)
12. "Powerhouse" (1948)
13. "En La Noche" (1952)
14. "Sun and Shadow" (1953)
15. "The Meadow" (1947)
16. "The Garbage Collector" (1953)
17. "The Great Fire" (1949)
18. "The Golden Apples of the Sun" (1953) (re-added in the third Doubleday printing)
19. "R Is for Rocket" (1943)
20. "The End of the Beginning" (1956)
21. "The Rocket" (1950)
22. "The Rocket Man" (1953)
23. "A Sound of Thunder" (1952)
24. "The Long Rain" (1950)
25. "The Exiles" (1950)
26. "Here There Be Tygers" (1951)
27. "The Strawberry Window" (1954)
28. "The Dragon" (1955)
29. "Frost and Fire" (1947)
30. "Uncle Einar" (1947)
31. "The Time Machine" (1957)
32. "The Sound of Summer Running" (1957)

== Paperback editions in English ==
1. Bradbury, Ray (May 1990). Classic Stories 1. Barclay Shaw (cover illustrator). Bantam Books. 342 pages. ISBN 0-553-28637-4.
  - The third Bantam Books printing (1995) adds "The Golden Apples of the Sun", and has 368 pages.
2. Bradbury, Ray (November 1997). The Golden Apples of the Sun and Other Stories. Tim O'Brien (cover illustrator). Avon Books. 338 pages. ISBN 0-380-73039-1.
3. Bradbury, Ray (July 2005). A Sound of Thunder and Other Stories. 338 pages. ISBN 0-06-078569-1.
