= Bradbury Stories: 100 of His Most Celebrated Tales =

2003 collection of short stories by Ray Bradbury

Bradbury Stories
- dust-jacket from the first edition
- Author: Ray Bradbury
- Language: English
- Genre: Science fiction, fantasy, horror
- Publisher: William Morrow
- Publication date: August 2003
- Publication place: United States
- Media type: Print (hardback)
- Pages: 893
- ISBN: 0-06-054242-X
- OCLC: 51631564
- Dewey Decimal: 813/.54 21
- LC Class: PS3503.R167 A6 2003

Bradbury Stories: 100 of His Most Celebrated Tales (2003) is a collection of short stories by Ray Bradbury. Bradbury wrote an introduction to the collection where he speaks about some of the inspirations, influences and among other things, the comedy duo Laurel and Hardy. The collection repeats no stories from The Stories of Ray Bradbury.

== Table of contents ==
- Introduction
- "The Whole Town's Sleeping"
- "The Rocket"
- "Season of Disbelief"
- "And the Rock Cried Out"
- "The Drummer Boy of Shiloh"
- "The Beggar on O'Connell Bridge"
- "The Flying Machine"
- "Heavy-Set"
- "The First Night of Lent"
- "Lafayette, Farewell"
- "Remember Sascha?"
- "Junior"
- "That Woman on the Lawn"
- "February 1999: Ylla"
- "Banshee"
- "One for His Lordship, and One for the Road!"
- "The Laurel and Hardy Love Affair"
- "Unterderseaboat Doktor"
- "Another Fine Mess"
- "The Dwarf"
- "A Wild Night in Galway"
- "The Wind"
- "No News, or What Killed the Dog?"
- "A Little Journey"
- "Any Friend of Nicholas Nickleby's Is a Friend of Mine"
- "The Garbage Collector"
- "The Visitor"
- "The Man"
- "Henry the Ninth"
- "The Messiah"
- "Bang! You're Dead!"
- "Darling Adolf"
- "The Beautiful Shave"
- "Colonel Stonesteel's Genuine Home-made Truly Egyptian Mummy"
- "I See You Never"
- "The Exiles"
- "At Midnight, in the Month of June"
- "The Witch Door"
- "The Watchers"
- "2004-05: The Naming of Names"
- "Hopscotch"
- "The Illustrated Man"
- "The Dead Man"
- "June 2001: And the Moon Be Still as Bright"
- "The Burning Man"
- "G.B.S.-Mark V"
- "A Blade of Grass"
- "The Sound of Summer Running"
- "And the Sailor, Home from the Sea"
- "The Lonely Ones"
- "The Finnegan"
- "On the Orient, North"
- "The Smiling People"
- "The Fruit at the Bottom of the Bowl"
- "Bug"
- "Downwind from Gettysburg"
- "Time in Thy Flight"
- "Changeling"
- "The Dragon"
- "Let's Play 'Poison'"
- "The Cold Wind and the Warm"
- "The Meadow"
- "The Kilimanjaro Device"
- "The Man in the Rorschach Shirt"
- "Bless Me, Father, for I Have Sinned"
- "The Pedestrian"
- "Trapdoor"
- "The Swan"
- "The Sea Shell"
- "Once More, Legato"
- "June 2003: Way in the Middle of the Air"
- "The Wonderful Death of Dudley Stone"
- "By the Numbers!"
- "April 2005: Usher II"
- "The Square Pegs"
- "The Trolley"
- "The Smile"
- "The Miracles of Jamie"
- "A Far-away Guitar"
- "The Cistern"
- "The Machineries of Joy"
- "Bright Phoenix"
- "The Wish"
- "The Lifework of Juan Díaz"
- "Time Intervening/Interim"
- "Almost the End of the World"
- "The Great Collision of Monday Last"
- "The Poems"
- "April 2026: The Long Years"
- "Icarus Montgolfier Wright"
- "Death and the Maiden"
- "Zero Hour"
- "The Toynbee Convector"
- "Forever and the Earth"
- "The Handler"
- "Getting Through Sunday Somehow"
- "The Pumpernickel"
- "Last Rites"
- "The Watchful Poker Chip of H. Matisse"
- "All on a Summer's Night"
