= From the Dust Returned =

2001 novel by Ray Bradbury

From the Dust Returned: A Family Remembrance
- Author: Ray Bradbury
- Cover artist: Charles Addams
- Language: English
- Genre: Fantasy
- Publisher: William Morrow and Company
- Publication date: 2001
- Publication place: United States
- Media type: Print (hardback)
- Pages: 205 pp
- ISBN: 0-380-97382-0
- OCLC: 45505966
- Dewey Decimal: 813/.54 21
- LC Class: PS3503.R167 F76 2001

From the Dust Returned: A Family Remembrance is a fix-up fantasy novel by Ray Bradbury published in 2001. The novel is largely created from a series of short stories Bradbury wrote decades earlier, centering on a family of Illinois-based monsters and ghosts named the Elliotts. Three new short stories are included, as well as several interstitial chapters to help connect the stories.

The novel features a cover illustration by Charles Addams, originally created to accompany the publication of the first Elliott story, "Homecoming", in Mademoiselle in 1946. The Elliotts bear a resemblance to Addams' own Addams Family characters. Bradbury and Addams were friends. Bradbury once discussed collaborating with Addams on an Elliott Family history, a concept which never came to fruition. In a 2001 interview, Bradbury states that Addams "went his way and created the Addams Family and I went my own way and created my family in this book."

== Contents ==
- "The Beautiful One Is Here"
- "The Town and the Place"
- "Anuba Arrives"
- "The High Attic"
- "The Sleeper and Her Dreams"
- "The Wandering Witch"
- "Whence Timothy?"
- "The House, the Spider, and the Child"
- "Mouse, Far-Traveling"
- "Homecoming"
- "West of October"
- "Many Returns"
- "On the Orient North"
- "Nostrum Paracelsius Crook"
- "The October People"
- "Uncle Einar"
- "The Whisperers"
- "The Theban Voice"
- "Make Haste to Live" (new)
- "The Chimney Sweeps"
- "The Traveler"
- "Return to the Dust" (new)
- "The One Who Remembers"
- "The Gift" (new)

== Publication history ==
The six previously published stories originally appeared in The Saturday Evening Post, Mademoiselle and Weird Tales. Two of the stories, "Homecoming" and "Uncle Einar", were also collected in Dark Carnival and The October Country. .

"The Wandering Witch" was originally published as "The April Witch". "West of October" had originally appeared in Bradbury's collection The Toynbee Convector. The stories "Make Haste to Live", "Return to the Dust" and "The Gift" appear for the first time here.

== Film ==
In 2012, MGM acquired the rights to create a film adaptation.

== Bibliography ==
- Brown, Charles N.; William G. Contento. "The Locus Index to Science Fiction (2001)".
