= A Pleasure to Burn =

2010 short story collection by Ray Bradbury

- A Pleasure to Burn cover
- Author: Ray Bradbury
- Cover artist: Joseph Mugnaini
- Language: English
- Subject: Censorship
- Genre: Science Fiction
- Published: 2011 Harper Collins
- Publication place: USA
- ISBN: 1596062908

A Pleasure to Burn: Fahrenheit 451 Stories is a collection of short stories by American writer Ray Bradbury, first published August 17, 2010. A companion to novel Fahrenheit 451, it was later released under the Harper Perennial imprint of HarperCollins publishing was in 2011.

Portions of A Pleasure to Burn: Fahrenheit 451 Stories were previously published in the collection Match to Flame: The Fictional Paths to Fahrenheit 451 and the chapbook The Dragon Who Ate His Tail.

This collection contains 16 selected short stories that prefigure Bradbury's Fahrenheit 451, and they can be seen as the origins for the novel's themes exploration and story. The book includes, among other titles, the novellas Long After Midnight and The Fireman.

== Contents ==
=== "The Reincarnate" ===
A man rises from his grave to try and reclaim his former life, only to find that he is no longer welcome in the world.

=== "Pillar of Fire" ===
In the year 2349, the last cemetery on Earth is being removed. The bodies are to be burnt, as all others have been. Upon hearing the commotion of what is happening, the final corpse decides to rise in the night and hide from this ultimate fate. He learns that horror writers such as Poe and Lovecraft have had their books burned and removed from the planet, and that nobody in this future society knows what fear is. At this point, he decides that as the last anachronism of the former world, he will be the one to teach the new world of fear. This story is also found in Bradbury's short story collection S is for Space.

=== "The Library" ===
Government officials raid a library to burn the last known copies of classic literature. This short could have been a scene cut from Fahrenheit 451.

=== "Bright Phoenix" ===
When the town's chief censor comes to use the library as a testing ground for burning selected books, a librarian angers him with his strange behavior. Originally written in 1947, the premise was later expanded upon and turned into The Fireman, the novella which was later expanded upon and turned into Fahrenheit 451.

=== "The Mad Wizards of Mars" ===
After burning all but a single copy of history's greatest horror writings, Earth attempts its first crewed expedition to Mars. The familiar, current occupants of the red planet aren't happy to see them coming. Originally published in Maclean's.

=== "Carnival of Madness" ===
A former library owner in a future in which the macabre has been banished uses the stories of Poe to plot his revenge on those who were responsible for the banishment of horror stories, films, Hallowe'en, etc. Revised as "Usher II" in The Martian Chronicles.

=== "Bonfire" ===
Two people have a phone conversation while waiting for the end of the world. One of them seems more concerned with the loss of all of the great art than with their lives.

=== "The Cricket on the Hearth" ===
When a couple discovers that the government is spying on them, it has a strange effect on their relationship. Originally included in the short story collection One More for the Road.

=== "The Pedestrian" ===
A man goes out for his routine evening stroll and ends up being stopped just for walking. Also included in the short story collection The Golden Apples of the Sun.

=== "The Garbage Collector" ===
A garbage collector learns that his job is no longer going to consist strictly of picking up garbage, but also something much more grisly. Also included in the short story collection The Golden Apples of the Sun.

=== "The Smile" ===
A little boy stands in line, awaiting his turn in a bizarre form of public entertainment involving the Mona Lisa.

=== "Long After Midnight" ===
Early version of the story that eventually became Fahrenheit 451.

=== "The Fireman" ===
Another early version of the original story that was later developed into Fahrenheit 451.

Bonus Stories:

=== "The Dragon Who Ate His Tail" ===
A couple contemplates taking a time travel vacation. Also included in the chapbook The Dragon Who Ate His Tail.

=== "Sometime Before Dawn" ===
A seemingly strange couple is observed by a neighbor. Also included in the chapbook The Dragon Who Ate His Tail.

=== "To the Future" ===
A couple takes advantage of a time travel vacation to try and hide from the miserable time in which they live. They are pursued by those who doesn't want them to escape. Also included in the chapbook The Dragon Who Ate His Tail.
