= Pleasure to Burn =

Pleasure to Burn may refer to:

- Pleasure to Burn (Burning Rain album), 2000
- Pleasure to Burn (Systematic album), 2003
- A Pleasure to Burn, a 2010 short-story collection by Ray Bradbury
