= Sun and Shadow =

Sun and Shadow may refer to:

- Sun and Shadow (play), by Walter Cooper, 1870
- "Sun and Shadow" (short story), by Ray Bradbury, 1953
- Sun and Shadow, a novel by Åke Edwardson
- Sun and Shadow, a film directed by Rangel Valtchanov, 1962
