= List of Ray Bradbury Theater episodes =

This is a list of the 65 episodes of The Ray Bradbury Theater, an American television series broadcast from 1985 to 1992. The series was produced at first by HBO and later by USA Productions. Author Ray Bradbury was the host and wrote teleplays for all of the episodes. The show had many well known guest stars, such as Peter O'Toole, William Shatner, and Tyne Daly.

== Series overview ==
Season	Episodes	Originally released		
Season	Episodes	First released	Last released	Network
1	6	May 21, 1985	February 22, 1986	HBO
2	12	January 23, 1988	May 28, 1988	USA Network
3	12	July 7, 1989	November 17, 1989	USA Network
4	12	July 20, 1990	November 30, 1990	USA Network
5	8	January 3, 1992	February 21, 1992	USA Network
6	15	July 10, 1992	October 30, 1992	USA Network

== Episodes ==
=== Season 1 (1985–86) ===
No. overall	No. in season	Title	Directed by	Written by	Original release date
1	1	"Marionettes, Inc."	Paul Lynch	Ray Bradbury	May 21, 1985
An overworked suburbanite husband (James Coco) uses a robot duplicate to allow himself to have fun while his overbearing wife is left none the wiser. Featuring Leslie Nielsen.
2	2	"The Playground"	William Fruet	Ray Bradbury	June 4, 1985
A father (William Shatner) haunted by the constant bullying he suffered in his childhood takes his son to a local playground, only to find that the ghosts of his past now reside in the playground.
3	3	"The Crowd"	Ralph L. Thomas	Ray Bradbury	July 2, 1985
A car crash survivor (Nick Mancuso) investigates a mysterious and sinister crowd that congregates at the sites of severe automobile accidents.
4	4	"The Town Where No One Got Off"	Don McBrearty	Ray Bradbury	February 22, 1986
A city slicker (Jeff Goldblum) impulsively stops at a rural town, and finds himself stalked by a sinister old man (Ed McNamara).
5	5	"The Screaming Woman"	Bruce Pittman	Ray Bradbury	February 22, 1986
A little girl (Drew Barrymore) hears a woman scream while playing in the middle of the forest. When no adults believe her, the girl decides to take matters into her own hands and investigates.
6	6	"Banshee"	Douglas Jackson	Ray Bradbury	February 22, 1986
An egotistical director (Peter O'Toole) challenges a skeptical young writer (Charles Martin Smith) to investigate the nearby woods to find out if the banshee said to haunt the woods exists.

=== Season 2 (1988) ===
No. overall	No. in season	Title	Directed by	Written by	Original release date
7	1	"The Fruit at the Bottom of the Bowl"	Gilbert M. Shilton	Ray Bradbury	January 23, 1988
A guest (Michael Ironside) murders his host (Robert Vaughn) and then becomes obsessed with cleaning any evidence that can implicate him in the crime.
8	2	"Skeleton"	Steve DiMarco	Ray Bradbury	February 6, 1988
A hypochondriac (Eugene Levy) contacts a “bone specialist” to get rid of his skeleton.
9	3	"The Emissary"	Sturla Gunnarsson	Ray Bradbury	February 13, 1988
An invalid boy's dog brings him people and things that it feels he needs, including a kindhearted schoolteacher (Helen Shaver). After the schoolteacher dies, the dog decides it must perform one last task for its master.
10	4	"Gotcha!"	Brad Turner	Ray Bradbury	February 20, 1988
A lonely man (Saul Rubinek) falls in love with a woman (Kate Lynch). When he asks her if the relationship will last, she decides to check by playing a game she calls “Gotcha!”.
11	5	"The Man Upstairs"	Alain Bonnot	Ray Bradbury	March 5, 1988
A young boy suspects his grandmother's strange new lodger (Féodor Atkine) is actually a vampire.
12	6	"The Small Assassin"	Tom Cotter	Ray Bradbury	April 9, 1988
A paranoid new mother (Susan Wooldridge) suspects that her baby is trying to kill her.
13	7	"Punishment Without Crime"	Bruce McDonald	Ray Bradbury	April 16, 1988
A man (Donald Pleasence) is arrested for killing a robot facsimile of his adulterous wife.
14	8	"On the Orient, North"	Frank Cassenti	Ray Bradbury	April 29, 1988
A nurse (Magali Noël) decides to assist a ghastly passenger (Ian Bannen) to reach his destiny before some unusual illness ends him.
15	9	"The Coffin"	Tom Cotter	Ray Bradbury	May 7, 1988
A dying millionaire (Daniel O'Herlihy) builds a glass coffin, much to the amusement of his greedy brother (Denholm Elliott). After the millionaire dies, his brother is told that if he can find the millionaire's savings, which are hidden inside his mansion, he'll gets everything. But finding it may come at a price.
16	10	"Tyrannosaurus Rex"	Gilles Béhat	Ray Bradbury	May 14, 1988
A cruel producer bullies a stop-motion animator he hired. The animator decides to get revenge by crafting a tyrannosaurus rex in the producer's image.
17	11	"There Was an Old Woman"	Bruce McDonald	Ray Bradbury	May 21, 1988
An old woman (Mary Morris) who spent her entire life defying death attempts to claim her body from the mortuary after she finally bites the dust. Featuring Ronald Lacey.
18	12	"And So Died Riabouchinska"	Denys Granier-Deferre	Ray Bradbury	May 28, 1988
A ventriloquist (Alan Bates) is implicated in a murder.

=== Season 3 (1989) ===
No. overall	No. in season	Title	Directed by	Written by	Original release date
19	1	"The Dwarf"	Costa Botes	Ray Bradbury	July 7, 1989
A carnival owner plays a cruel prank on an unsuspecting little person who frequents the hall of mirrors. Featuring Megan Follows.
20	2	"A Miracle of Rare Device"	Roger Tompkins	Ray Bradbury	July 14, 1989
Two drifters (Pat Harrington Jr., Wayne Robson) make a startling discovery in the desert and seek to profit from it.
21	3	"The Lake"	Pat Robins	Ray Bradbury	July 21, 1989
Years after his childhood sweetheart died, a young man (Gordon Thomson) returns to the lake where she disappeared.
22	4	"The Wind"	Graham McLean	Ray Bradbury	July 28, 1989
A weather expert (Michael Sarrazin) is tormented by a strange wind.
23	5	"The Pedestrian"	Alun Bollinger	Ray Bradbury	August 4, 1989
A man (David Ogden Stiers) who takes night time walks is seen as engaging in deviant behavior, as he seeks his friend to accompany him.
24	6	"A Sound of Thunder"	Costa Botes	Ray Bradbury	August 11, 1989
An adaptation of Bradbury's A Sound of Thunder; time travelers (Kiel Martin, John Bach) make a simple mistake: never ever get off the beaten path.
25	7	"The Wonderful Death of Dudley Stone"	David Copeland	Ray Bradbury	August 18, 1989
Author Dudley Stone (John Saxon) is approached by a rival who announces his intention to kill him... a fate that doesn't quite bother Stone one bit.
26	8	"The Haunting of the New"	Roger Tompkins	Ray Bradbury	September 15, 1989
A wealthy socialite (Susannah York), known for extravagant parties of old, rebuilds her stately mansion after a fire and discovers that her new home does not agree with her past.
27	9	"To the Chicago Abyss"	Randy Bradshaw	Ray Bradbury	September 22, 1989
A man (Harold Gould) is pursued and considered an enemy of the state for simply reminding people of "the good ol' days."
28	10	"Hail and Farewell"	Allan Kroeker	Ray Bradbury	September 30, 1989
A young man (Josh Saviano), unable to age, makes a profession out of his situation, for his sake and others.
29	11	"The Veldt"	Brad Turner	Ray Bradbury	November 10, 1989
Two children, spoiled rotten by their virtual reality playroom, rebel against their parents.
30	12	"Boys! Raise Giant Mushrooms in Your Cellar!"	David Brandes	Ray Bradbury	November 17, 1989
Alien mushrooms control a group of children to do their evil bidding.

=== Season 4 (1990) ===
No. overall	No. in season	Title	Directed by	Written by	Original release date
31	1	"Mars Is Heaven"	John Laing	Ray Bradbury	July 20, 1990
An astronaut (Hal Linden) and his team land on Mars and discover they're not so far from home at all.
32	2	"The Murderer"	Roger Tompkins	Ray Bradbury	July 27, 1990
A psychologist (Cedric Smith) visits a prisoner (Bruce Weitz) who lost his mind because of everyday noises.
33	3	"Touched with Fire"	Roger Tompkins	Ray Bradbury	August 3, 1990
A retired insurance man (Barry Morse) and his colleague are convinced an old woman (Eileen Brennan) is about to be murdered and seek to prevent it.
34	4	"The Black Ferris"	Roger Tompkins	Ray Bradbury	August 10, 1990
Two young boys become convinced the carnival that just came to town is evil.
35	5	"Usher II"	Lee Tamahori	Ray Bradbury	August 17, 1990
An adaptation of Bradbury's story from The Martian Chronicles; a librarian (Patrick Macnee) vows revenge and builds a murderous replica of Poe's House of Usher.
36	6	"Touch of Petulance"	John Laing	Ray Bradbury	October 12, 1990
A man (Eddie Albert) travels back from the future to dissuade his younger self from killing his wife.
37	7	"And the Moon Be Still as Bright"	Randy Bradshaw	Ray Bradbury	October 19, 1990
During an expedition to Mars, an archaeologist (David Carradine) turns against his crew in defense of an extinct Martian race.
38	8	"The Toynbee Convector"	John Laing	Ray Bradbury	October 26, 1990
The reclusive Stiles (James Whitmore), world famous for being the first time traveler, is interviewed on the day his past self came to the future, and plans to confess all to an eager reporter (Michael Hurst).
39	9	"Exorcism"	Brad Turner	Ray Bradbury	November 2, 1990
A woman (Jayne Eastwood) plans to expose her nemesis (Sally Kellerman) as a witch to the public and most importantly to her inner circle of friends.
40	10	"The Day It Rained Forever"	Randy Bradshaw	Ray Bradbury	November 9, 1990
Three old men in a dusty old town wait for the day when it will rain. They have waited for a long time. Featuring Vincent Gardenia.
41	11	"The Long Years"	Paul Lynch	Ray Bradbury	November 16, 1990
Astronauts come to the aid of a family stranded on Mars 20 years ago. Featuring Robert Culp.
42	12	"Here There Be Tygers"	John Laing	Ray Bradbury	November 30, 1990
A group of explorers land on a distant planet and discover a virtual paradise. Featuring Timothy Bottoms.

=== Season 5 (1992) ===
No. overall	No. in season	Title	Directed by	Written by	Original release date
43	1	"The Earthmen"	Graeme Campbell	Ray Bradbury	January 3, 1992
Two expedition teams that went to Mars were never heard from again. A third discovers why.
44	2	"Zero Hour"	Don McBrearty	Ray Bradbury	January 10, 1992
Children are enlisted by invaders with a game that will help conquer the Earth. Featuring Katharine Isabelle and Sally Kirkland.
45	3	"The Jar"	Randy Bradshaw	Ray Bradbury	January 17, 1992
A farmer (Paul Le Mat) purchases a strange creature in a jar from a carnival sideshow, but becomes a danger when he finds out it's a fake.
46	4	"Colonel Stonesteel and the Desperate Empties"	Randy Bradshaw	Ray Bradbury	January 24, 1992
A young boy (Shawn Ashmore) and his friend Colonel Stonesteel (Harold Gould) combat the end of summer doldrums by engaging in an elaborate hoax involving an ancient mummy that whips the whole town up in a frenzy.
47	5	"The Concrete Mixer"	Eleanor Lindo	Ray Bradbury	January 31, 1992
Invaders from Mars land in an idyllic American town... and are welcomed with open arms, while also learning the true nature of the American way of life. Featuring Ben Cross.
48	6	"The Utterly Perfect Murder"	Stuart Margolin	Ray Bradbury	February 7, 1992
A child prodigy (Richard Kiley) was tormented by bullies in his youth. 50 years later, he finally returns to get his revenge.
49	7	"Let's Play Poison"	Bruce Pittman	Ray Bradbury	February 14, 1992
A teacher (Richard Benjamin) vows revenge after witnessing a student's death due to bullying.
50	8	"The Martian"	Anne Wheeler	Ray Bradbury	February 21, 1992
A couple living on Mars encounter their dead son, with very mixed reactions. Featuring John Vernon.

=== Season 6 (1992) ===
No. overall	No. in season	Title	Directed by	Written by	Original release date
51	1	"The Lonely One"	Ian Mune	Ray Bradbury	July 10, 1992
A woman (Joanna Cassidy) ventures out amid a serial killer's rampage and finds herself walking home alone at midnight.
52	2	"The Happiness Machine"	John Laing	Ray Bradbury	July 17, 1992
An inventor (Elliott Gould) manages to create a machine that can make people happy.
53	3	"Tomorrow's Child"	Costa Botes	Ray Bradbury	August 14, 1992
A couple's child is born in another dimension, and they must deal with the complex reality of this unusual situation. Featuring Carol Kane.
54	4	"The Anthem Sprinters"	Wayne Tourell	Ray Bradbury	August 21, 1992
While visiting Dublin, an American writer (Len Cariou) is caught up in a local Irish tradition called "anthem sprinting."
55	5	"By the Numbers"	Wayne Tourell	Ray Bradbury	September 11, 1992
A man reminisces about his childhood and his drill sergeant father (Ray Sharkey).
56	6	"The Long Rain"	Lee Tamahori	Ray Bradbury	September 19, 1992
An army spaceship crash lands on a planet where it always rains, and they seek out the only known shelter that exists. Featuring Marc Singer.
57	7	"The Dead Man"	Costa Botes	Ray Bradbury	September 26, 1992
Odd Martin (Frank Whitten) becomes friends with Miss Weldon (Louise Fletcher), who seems to be fine with the fact that he's dead.
58	8	"Sun and Shadow (Note: The title appears on-screen as "Sun and Shaddow")"	Larry Parr	Ray Bradbury	October 3, 1992
A film crew descends on a Mexican town, but one of the locals (Gregory Sierra) has had enough with the interlopers who belittle their way of life.
59	9	"Silent Towns"	Lee Tamahori	Ray Bradbury	October 10, 1992
A man (John Glover) is stranded on Mars during an evacuation, and desperately seeks out someone, anyone, else who may still remain. (Note: This episode is based on a story that Ray Bradbury featured in The Martian Chronicles)
60	10	"Downwind From Gettysburg"	Chris Bailey	Ray Bradbury	October 17, 1992
Walter Bynes (Howard Hesseman) has created a robotic duplicate of Abraham Lincoln. If one can believe it, the night of its public unveiling is marred by a killer named Booth (Robert Joy) who plans to assassinate the robot.
61	11	"Some Live Like Lazarus"	Peter Sharp	Ray Bradbury	October 24, 1992
A couple who've had to endure the groom-to-be's domineering mother for 40 years are uncertain how to proceed onward when she finally dies.
62	12	"The Handler"	Peter Sharp	Ray Bradbury	October 27, 1992
A mortician (Michael J. Pollard) has made a career of punishing his enemies in his morbid workplace. His time, however, is up.
63	13	"Fee Fie Foe Fum"	John Reid	Ray Bradbury	October 28, 1992
A prankster goes too far in tormenting his wife's grandmother (Jean Stapleton). Featuring Lucy Lawless.
64	14	"Great Wide World Over There"	Ian Mune	Ray Bradbury	October 29, 1992
Cora Gibbs (Tyne Daly) lives on an isolated farm, but thanks to her nephew (David Orth) finally has the chance to connect with the outside world.
65	15	"The Tombstone"	Warrick Attewell	Ray Bradbury	October 30, 1992
A woman (Shelley Duvall) thinks the hotel she and her husband are staying in is haunted. The tombstone in her room would surely give anyone cause for concern.
