= The Exiles (Bradbury story) =

- Short story by Ray Bradbury
- Original title: The Mad Wizards of Mars
- Country: United States
- Language: English
- Genre: Science fiction

Publication
- Published in: Maclean's; The Magazine of Fantasy & Science Fiction; The Illustrated Man; R is for Rocket; Bradbury Stories: 100 of His Most Celebrated Tales; A Sound of Thunder and Other Stories; A Pleasure to Burn
- Media type: Print

"The Exiles" is a science fiction short story by Ray Bradbury. It was originally published as "The Mad Wizards of Mars" in Maclean's on September 15, 1949, and was reprinted, in revised form, the following year by The Magazine of Fantasy & Science Fiction. First collected in The Illustrated Man (1951), it was later included in the collections R Is for Rocket (1962), Bradbury Stories: 100 of His Most Celebrated Tales (2003), A Sound of Thunder and Other Stories (2005) and A Pleasure to Burn (2010, under the "Mad Wizards" title and presumably with the Maclean's text). It was also published in "The Eureka Years: Blucher and McComas's Magazine of Fantasy and Science Fiction" (Bantam Books, 1982)(ISBN 0553206737).

== Plot summary ==
Circa the year 2120, the planet Earth contrived to ban and outlaw the books of supernaturalist authors such as H.P. Lovecraft, Edgar Allan Poe, Algernon Blackwood and Ambrose Bierce. A century later in the year 2120, the dying crew of an interplanetary rocket-ship is headed for the planet Mars. The crew is plagued by needle-sharp pains and nightmarish visions and dreams, caused by the incantations and magical fires of the martian Exiles -- the banned authors Shakespeare, Blackwood, Bierce, Lovecraft and Poe, and their literary characters -- who are fearfully aware of the approaching rocket. The Exiles are already fading from existence because the people of Earth have burned nearly all their books.

The Exiles soon learn that the rocket captain is carrying away from Earth the very last copies of the forbidden books that survived the conflagration. In desperation, Poe and Bierce attempt to entreat Charles Dickens to negotiate with the rocket crew once it arrives, but the pompous Dickens bitterly resents his inclusion among mere fantasy and supernatural writers, and rejects Poe's request. The rocket crew does arrive, but finds only a few flickering signs that Mars might have been inhabited by the Exiles. Seeking to forever banish the 'supernatural' plague before they colonize Mars, the rocket ship's crew burn the books that the captain has brought with him, thus consigning the Exiles to oblivion.

== Adaptations ==
"The Exiles" was adapted to the Eclipse comic book Alien Encounters No. 10 (December 1986) by Tom Sutton.

== Reception ==
Author and literary critic Gore Vidal admired Bradbury and this story in particular, calling it "a good short story" and saying that it represented Bradbury "at his best".

== Related stories ==
Bradbury also wrote of similar futures where books were banned, with references to Poe and other authors, in the short stories "Pillar of Fire" and "Usher II" (1950), and the novel Fahrenheit 451.

The Three Witches from Shakespeare's Macbeth appear at the beginning of the story. Similar characters reappear in another of Bradbury's short stories, "The Concrete Mixer," also dealing with Mars, and they provided the title of Bradbury's novel, Something Wicked This Way Comes.

Despite its Martian setting the 1950 version of this Mars tale is set in the year 2167 (later adjusted to 2120, as various story timelines became better aligned). It is thus not a formal part of Bradbury's famous collection The Martian Chronicles which ends in the year 2057.
