= Golden Kite =

Golden Kite may refer to:

- Golden Kite Award, a literary award given by the Society of Children's Book Writers and Illustrators
- Golden Kite Prize, the top film award in Vietnam
- Order of the Golden Kite, an order of the Empire of Japan
- "The Golden Kite, the Silver Wind", a 1953 short story by Ray Bradbury

== See also ==
- Kite (bird)
