= R Is for Rocket =

1962 short story collection by Ray Bradbury

- Dust-jacket from the first edition
- Author: Ray Bradbury
- Cover artist: Joseph Mugnaini
- Language: English
- Genre: Science fiction
- Publisher: Doubleday & Company
- Publication date: 1962
- Publication place: United States
- Media type: Print (hardback)
- Pages: 233 pp
- Followed by: S Is for Space

R is for Rocket (1962) is a short story collection by American writer Ray Bradbury, compiled for Young Adult library sections. It contains fifteen stories from earlier Bradbury collections, and two previously uncollected stories.

== Contents ==
1. "R is for Rocket" (first published as "King of the Gray Spaces")
2. "The End of the Beginning"
3. "The Fog Horn"
4. "The Rocket"
5. "The Rocket Man"
6. "The Golden Apples of the Sun"
7. "A Sound of Thunder"
8. "The Long Rain"
9. "The Exiles"
10. "Here There Be Tygers"
11. "The Strawberry Window"
12. "The Dragon"
13. "The Gift"
14. "Frost and Fire"
15. "Uncle Einar"
16. "The Time Machine"
17. "The Sound of Summer Running"
