= The Dragon (short story) =

1955 short story by Ray Bradbury

- Short story by Ray Bradbury
- Country: United States
- Language: English
- Genre: Fantasy

Publication
- Published in: Esquire
- Publication type: Periodical
- Media type: Print (Magazine)
- Publication date: August 1955

The Dragon
- dust-jacket from the first edition
- Author: Ray Bradbury
- Illustrator: Ken Snyder
- Cover artist: Ken Snyder
- Language: English
- Genre: Fantasy short story
- Publisher: Footsteps Press
- Publication date: 1988
- Publication place: United States
- Media type: Print (Paperback)
- Pages: 15 pp

"The Dragon" is a short story by American writer Ray Bradbury, originally published in 1955 in the magazine Esquire. A limited edition (352 copies, signed and numbered or lettered) of the story was published by Footsteps Press in 1988. It appears in A Medicine for Melancholy (1959), R is for Rocket (1962), Classic Stories 1 (1990), and Bradbury Stories (2003).

== Plot ==
The story concerns two knights who have a mission to slay a dragon. They describe the dragon as huge, fire-breathing, and horrific, having only one eye. They charge the dragon but fail, presumably dying in the attempt.

The "dragon" is then revealed to be a steam train, and its single eye is the train's headlight. The operators discuss the encounter but continue on without attempting to find the knights.

== Sources ==
- Chalker, Jack L.; Mark Owings (1998). The Science-Fantasy Publishers: A Bibliographic History, 1923-1998. Westminster, MD and Baltimore: Mirage Press, Ltd. p. 264.
- Brown, Charles N.; William G. Contento. "The Locus Index to Science Fiction (1984-1998)".
