= Ray Bradbury Collected Short Stories =

- First edition
- Author: Ray Bradbury
- Illustrator: Rob Court
- Language: English
- Series: The Great Author Series
- Genre: Fantasy, science fiction
- Publisher: Peterson Publishing
- Publication date: 2001
- Publication place: United States
- Media type: Print (hardback)
- Pages: 104 pp
- ISBN: 0-9709033-2-4
- OCLC: 46683593

Ray Bradbury Collected Short Stories is a collection of three short stories by Ray Bradbury. It was published in 2001 as part of Peterson Publishing's The Great Author Series. The stories originally appeared in the magazines The Saturday Evening Post and New Story.

== Contents ==
- "The Other Foot"
- "The April Witch"
- "The Veldt"
