= Come into My Cellar =

1962 short story by Ray Bradbury

- Short story by Ray Bradbury
- Country: United States
- Language: English
- Genre: Science fiction short story

Publication
- Published in: Galaxy Magazine
- Publication type: Periodical
- Media type: Print (Magazine)
- Publication date: October 1962

Come into My Cellar, alternatively titled Boys! Raise Giant Mushrooms in Your Cellar!, is a science fiction short story by American writer Ray Bradbury. It was originally published in Galaxy Magazine in October 1962, and was subsequently included in the short-story collection S is for Space.

The story is about an alien invasion in the form of fungi who take over the body and free will of whoever consumes them, and disperse by sending Special Delivery packages to new victims with mushrooms to be grown and eaten.

Ray Bradbury mentioned having the idea for the story while eating steak and mushrooms with a group of editors, and not being taken seriously by them. He then joked that he didn't eat mushrooms for the following years.

== Plot summary ==
Hugh Fortnum wakes up to the noises of his family and neighbour. He opens the window and greets his neighbour Mrs. Goodbody, intent in treating her bushes against bugs and pests, and convinced of being the first line of defence against flying saucers.

Hugh hears the doorbell and walks downstairs to find his wife Cynthia holding a Special Delivery package from New Orleans for their son Tom. The small package is from the Great Bayou Novelty Greenhouse, and contains ‘The Sylvan Glade Jumbo-Giant Guaranteed Growth Raise-Them-in-Your-Cellar-for-Big-Profit Mushrooms’. Tom goes down to the cellar and starts planting the mushrooms. As the advertisement says, they will show fabulous growth within only 24 hours.

Toward noon, Hugh Fortnum is driving to the market when he picks up his friend Roger Willis, a biology teacher. Roger is scared and tells Hugh about his intuitive belief that something is wrong with the world. Hugh asks Roger what to do about it, and Roger tells him to wait and observe the world for a few days. Roger leaves, and Hugh drives away.

Hugh sits on his porch with his wife and asks her if she has had any sort of intuition lately. She ponders the question and answers that she did not, when Tom appears, showing them the remarkable growth of the mushrooms he’s cultivating in the cellar. In just seven hours, hundreds of greyish brown mushrooms are sprouting from the soil. Cynthia feels uneasy, asks if what Tom is growing really are mushrooms and Tom leaves angrily for the cellar. The phone rings and it’s Dorothy, Roger Willis’ wife. She says that her husband is gone, and asks for Hugh’s help.

Hugh goes over to Roger and Dorothy Willis' house and sees that Roger’s clothes are gone. Dorothy and the son Joe are confused about the sudden disappearance of Roger. Before promising Dorothy that he will try to find Roger, Hugh sees Joe walking down to the cellar.

Hugh goes back home to find his neighbour, Mrs. Goodbody, fighting off aphids, waterbugs, woodworms, and now Marasmius oreades. He explains to his wife about the disappearance of Roger Willis when a delivery boy brings him a telegram from Roger, saying that he is in New Orleans and that Hugh must refuse all Special Delivery packages at all costs. Hugh calls the police.

In the evening, the phone rings at the Fortnum’s house. It is Roger, saying he is on a business trip and asking Hugh why he sent the police to find him. He also tells Hugh that his wife and son knew about his trip, and that he will be back in five days. Roger passes the phone to an angry lieutenant, asking Hugh for explanations.

Hugh calls Dorothy, and she confirms that her son received, like all kids in the neighbourhood, a Special Delivery package a few days earlier, the same as Tom received in the morning. Watching a meteor in the sky, Hugh starts to suspect that something invaded Earth. He ponders that an alien invasion would not come by meteors or flying saucers, but by means of spores, seeds, pollens or viruses raining on Earth from space; and he thinks that a spore germinating into a mushroom would not need arms and legs to send itself around via Special Delivery, if it could be eaten by a person, infiltrate their blood and take over their cells. Just like what happened to Roger Willis, concludes Hugh, who became something else after eating the mushrooms grown by his son.

Cynthia goes to bed and Hugh pours himself a glass of milk. In the fridge, he finds a fresh-cut mushroom, left by Tom for his parents to eat after he himself had a mushroom sandwich. Hugh leaves the mushrooms at the bottom of the stairs leading upstairs. He calls to his son Tom who is down in the cellar tending his crop. Tom tells his dad to come down to see the harvest. Hugh goes down into the dark cellar, shutting the door behind him.

== Reception ==
- The Master of Arts thesis by Şeyma Karaca discusses the story (with the alternative title "Boys! Raise giant mushrooms in your cellar!") from a perspective of mental metamorphosis and alien invasion.
- The "SF Personality" series #24 by Hardy Kettlitz summarizes the story and highlights the increasing paranoia throughout it, giving the interpretation that, at the end, Hugh Fortnum walks into the cellar without knowing what awaits him.
- John Booth for Wired included the short story as one of "Ten stories by Ray Bradbury to get you into the Halloween spirit" due to its suspence and lurking menace.
- In the essay by Eric S. Rabkin "Is Mars heaven? The Martian chronicles, Fahrenheit 451 and Ray Bradbury's landscape of longing" in "Visions of Mars: Essays on the Red Planet in Fiction and Science", the author highlights how the story, with invaders from outer space taking over the body and the mind of citizens, fits within the narrative of its historical times (Cold War).

== Adaptations ==
- Ray Bradbury wrote the Alfred Hitchcock Presents TV show Special Delivery (1959) based on a similar plot.
- Under the pen name Luis Peñafiel, Narciso Ibáñez Serrador adapted the story into the two-part episode "La Bodega" for the 1966 Spanish anthology tv series Historias para no dormir.
- The story was adapted into the short movie The Ray Bradbury Theater: Boys! Raise Giant Mushrooms In Your Cellar! (1989).
- The comic strip Come into My Cellar by English comic artist Dave Gibbons is based on Ray Bradbury's short story
