= Resurrect Dead: The Mystery of the Toynbee Tiles =

- Directed by: Jon Foy
- Written by: Jon Foy; Colin Smith
- Produced by: Jon Foy; Colin Smith
- Starring: Justin Duerr; Steve Weinik; Colin Smith
- Edited by: Jon Foy
- Music by: Jon Foy
- Distributed by: Focus Features
- Release date: September 2011 (US)
- Running time: 87 minutes
- Language: English

Resurrect Dead: The Mystery of the Toynbee Tiles, directed by Jon Foy, is a 2011 independent documentary film about the Toynbee tile phenomenon. The film was selected for the 2011 Sundance Film Festival in the U.S. Documentary category, and Foy won the category's Directing Award.

== Toynbee tiles ==
Toynbee tiles are linoleum tiles of unknown origin found embedded in the asphalt of streets in about two dozen major cities in the United States and four South American capitals. Since the 1980s, several hundred tiles have been discovered. They are generally about the size of an American license plate and contain some variation on the following inscription:

TOYNBEE IDEA
IN Kubrick's 2001
RESURRECT DEAD
ON PLANET JUPITER.

== The film ==
Philadelphia residents Justin Duerr, Jon Foy, Colin Smith, and Steve Weinik began work on the film in 2005, seeking to find the source of the tiles and the meaning of the message.

Throughout the film, evidence is presented that a reclusive Philadelphia resident, Severino "Sevy" Verna, was responsible for the tiles. The filmmakers claim that Verna began by broadcasting a message via short wave radio about his theories before later beginning to place the tiles, at times through a hole in the floor of his car. Previous research had identified a Philadelphia carpenter, James Morasco, as the likely placer of the tiles. The filmmakers believe the name was an alias used by Verna.
