= The Toynbee Convector (short story collection) =

1988 short story collection by Ray Bradbury

- dust-jacket from the first edition
- Author: Ray Bradbury
- Language: English
- Genre: Science fiction, fantasy, horror
- Publisher: Knopf
- Publication date: 1988
- Publication place: United States
- Media type: Print (hardback)
- Pages: 275 pp
- ISBN: 0-394-54703-9
- OCLC: 424449064
- Dewey Decimal: 813/.54 19
- LC Class: PS3503.R167 T69 1988

The Toynbee Convector is a short story collection by American writer Ray Bradbury. Several of the stories are original to this collection. Others originally appeared in the magazines Playboy, Omni, Gallery, Ellery Queen's Mystery Magazine, Woman's Day, and Weird Tales.

== Contents ==
- "The Toynbee Convector"
- "Trapdoor"
- "On the Orient, North"
- "One Night in Your Life"
- "West of October"
- "The Last Circus"
- "The Laurel and Hardy Love Affair"
- "I Suppose You Are Wondering Why We Are Here?"
- "Lafayette, Farewell"
- "Banshee"
- "Promises, Promises"
- "The Love Affair"
- "One for His Lordship, and One for the Road!"
- "At Midnight, in the Month of June"
- "Bless Me Father, for I Have Sinned"
- "By the Numbers!"
- "A Touch of Petulance"
- "Long Division"
- "Come, and Bring Constance!"
- "Junior"
- "The Tombstone"
- "The Thing at the Top of the Stairs"
- "Colonel Stonesteel’s Genuine Home-Made Truly Egyptian Mummy"
