= The Rocket (short story) =

1950 science fiction short story by Ray Bradbury

"The Illustrated Man"
- Short story by Ray Bradbury
- Country: United States
- Language: English
- Genre: Science fiction

Publication
- Media type: Print
- Publication date: 1950

"The Rocket" is a science fiction short story (initially published under the name "Outcast of the Stars") by American writer Ray Bradbury. It is also included in The Illustrated Man, a collection of short stories by Ray Bradbury.

== Plot ==
The story begins with Fiorello Bodoni, a poor junkyard owner, who spends his nights admiring nearby rocket launches bound for the Moon, Venus, and Mars. After six years, he has finally saved enough money to send one of his family members to Mars. However, when he presents the opportunity to his wife and children, they quickly realize that none could bear the guilt of experiencing such a wonderful journey while the rest stay behind. Bodoni dejectedly returns to his business, but after a stroke of luck, is offered the chance to purchase a mock-up rocket.

He decides to spend his savings on the mock-up and secretly spends the night building a replica rocket with a theater in the cabin using color film, mirrors, and screens. He then excitedly tells his family that they will all be able to make the journey to Mars and back. Despite his wife's hesitations, he takes his children on a convincing trip to outer-space, one that they say they will "remember... for always."

In the end, his wife realizes what a wonderful memory he has given their children, even though the rocket never left the ground, and agrees to share a short trip in the rocket with him in the future.

== Adaptations ==
"The Rocket" was adapted as a radio drama by Ernest Kinoy in 1952 as a part of the NBC Presents: Short Story series. On March 16, 1952, CBS Television Workshop aired a television adaptation of "The Rocket" starring Martin Ritt. Additionally, a comic adaptation by Joe Orlando and Al Feldstein appeared in Weird Science (EC Publications, November–December 1953) under its original title "Outcast of the Stars," and later in Bradbury's collection of comic adaptations, Tomorrow Midnight (Ballantine, 1966). The 2006 film The Astronaut Farmer (with Billy Bob Thornton and Bruce Willis) is loosely based on "The Rocket" and shared a very similar theme and moral.

== Publication history ==
- Super Science Stories (March 1950, ed. Ejler Jakobsson) - published under the name "Outcast of the Stars."
- The Illustrated Man (1951, Ray Bradbury)
- R Is for Rocket (1962, Ray Bradbury)
- Tomorrow: Science Fiction and the Future (1973, ed. Alan L. Madsen)
- Classic Stories 1: From The Golden Apples of the Sun and R is for Rocket (1990, Ray Bradbury)
- Bradbury Stories: 100 of His Most Celebrated Tales (2003, Ray Bradbury)
