= Toynbee tiles =

Messages of unknown origin found embedded in asphalt of streets

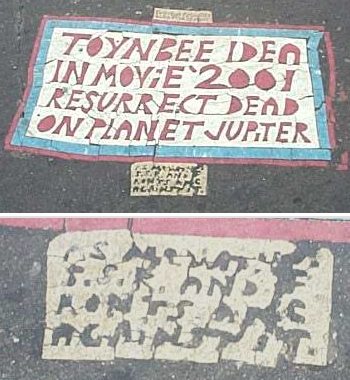
Top: Large, colorful Toynbee tile found in downtown Washington, D.C.; Bottom: Closeup of its bottom tab, apparently mentioning the Soviet Union, which had been gone for years by the time this photo was taken. ("As media U.S.S.R. and Fronts are against it.")

The Toynbee tiles, also called Toynbee plaques, are messages of unknown origin found embedded in asphalt of streets in about two dozen major cities in the United States and three South American cities. Since the 1980s, several hundred tiles have been discovered. They are generally about the size of an American license plate (roughly 30 by 15 cm or 12 by 6 in), but sometimes considerably larger. They contain some variation of the following inscription:

TOYNBEE IDEA
IN MOViE `2001
RESURRECT DEAD
ON PLANET JUPiTER

Some of the more elaborate tiles also feature cryptic political statements or exhort readers to create and install similar tiles. The material used for making the tiles was initially unknown, but evidence has emerged that they may be primarily made of layers of linoleum and asphalt crack-filling compound. Articles about the tiles began appearing in the mid-1990s, though references may have begun to appear in the mid-1980s.

== History ==
The first confirmed sighting of the Toynbee tiles was in Philadelphia in 1983, and their first known reference in the media came in 1994 in The Baltimore Sun. A 1983 letter to The Philadelphia Inquirer referenced a Philadelphia-based campaign with themes similar to those mentioned in the tiles (e.g., resurrecting the dead on Jupiter, Stanley Kubrick, and Arnold J. Toynbee) but did not refer to tiles.

In the United States, tiles have officially been sighted as far west as Kansas City, Missouri, as far north as Boston, Massachusetts, and as far south as Richmond, Virginia. Since 2002, very few new tiles considered to be the work of the original artist have appeared outside of the immediate Philadelphia, Pennsylvania area, although one notable sighting appeared in suburban Connecticut in 2006, and one appeared in Edison, New Jersey in 2007. Presumed copycat tiles have been spotted in Noblesville, Indiana; Buffalo, New York; Syracuse, New York; San Francisco, California; Portland, Oregon; and Roswell, New Mexico as well as a 1997 sighting in Detroit, Michigan and a 2013 sighting in Tulsa, Oklahoma. Many older tiles considered to be the work of the original tiler have been eroded by traffic, but as of 2011 older tiles remain in Pittsburgh, Pennsylvania; St. Louis, Missouri; Cincinnati, Ohio, Cleveland, Ohio; and South America, among other locations.

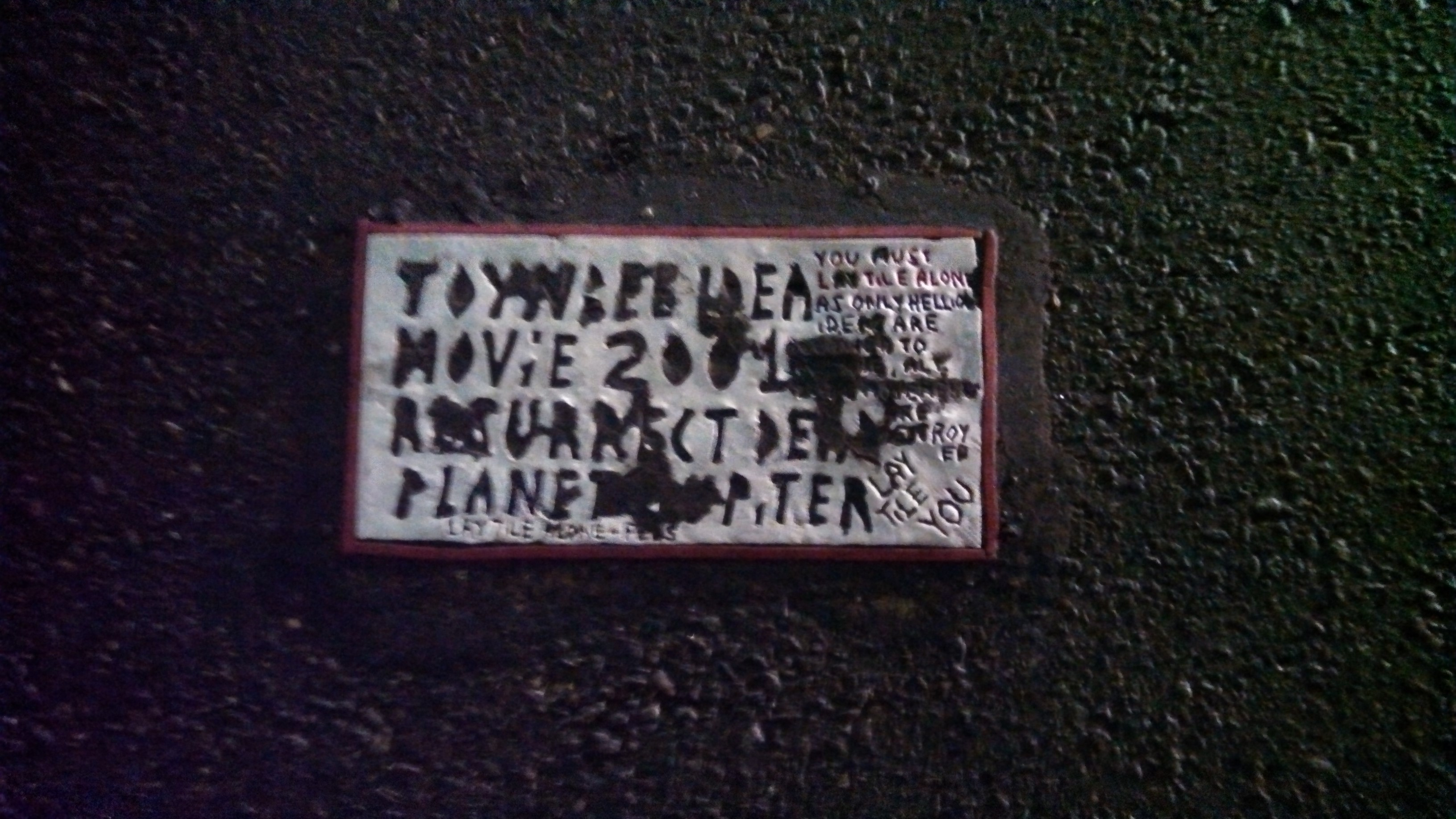
A Toynbee tile in New York City, 2013

On June 19, 2013, tiles resembling the Toynbee tiles appeared on a street in Topeka, Kansas. They were removed by the evening of the next day. Less than a month later, on July 17, 2013, a tile resembling the Toynbee tiles appeared on a street in Salt Lake City, Utah.

Newer tiles have been embedded on several major highways in Pennsylvania, including Interstate 476 in Delaware County, and on Interstate 95. About six more were found on U.S. 1 northbound starting in Drexel Hill in Delaware County, Pennsylvania in 2007 and 2008. The plates are much larger than the originals and have red italic writing on them. In 2016, some tiles started re-appearing in Philadelphia.

== Interpretations ==
=== People and things referred to ===
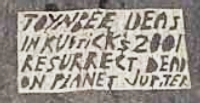
Commonly, a city will have a couple of large and colorful tiles along with numerous small and simple tiles like this one, just a block from the White House.

In a documentary film about the tiles, Justin Duerr assumes that "Toynbee" refers to the 20th century British historian Arnold J. Toynbee, and that "Kubrick's 2001" is a reference to the 1968 film 2001: A Space Odyssey, a film co-written and directed by filmmaker Stanley Kubrick, about a crewed mission to Jupiter. The former speculation site toynbee.net theorized that 'Toynbee' referred to Ray Bradbury's short story "The Toynbee Convector".

The majority of tiles contain text similar to that above, although a second set is often found nearby. Several of these allude to a mass conspiracy between the press (including newspaper magnate John S. Knight of Knight-Ridder), the U.S. government, the USSR (including tiles seemingly made years after the Soviet Union's dissolution), and "hellion Jews".

A tile that used to be located in Santiago de Chile mentions a street address: 2624 S. 7th Philadelphia, Pennsylvania. In 2006, the occupants of the house stated that they knew nothing about the tiles and were annoyed by people who asked, although the house was the former residence of a named recluse and alleged tile-maker, as shown in the 2011 documentary film Resurrect Dead: The Mystery of the Toynbee Tiles. Toynbee-tile enthusiasts believe that a native Philadelphian created the Toynbee tiles because of the large number that appear in the city, their apparent age, the variety of carving styles, the presence of the "tile creator's screed," and the Philadelphia address on the Santiago tile.

=== Possible subjects ===
==== Arnold J. Toynbee's "The Idea" ====
According to letters written by the tiler, allegedly uncovered by Toynbee tile researchers in Philadelphia in 2006, "Toynbee's idea" stems from a passage in Arnold Toynbee's book Experiences:

Human nature presents human minds with a puzzle which they have not yet solved and may never succeed in solving, for all that we can tell. The dichotomy of a human being into 'soul' and 'body' is not a datum of experience. No one has ever been, or ever met, a living human soul without a body... Someone who accepts—as I myself do, taking it on trust—the present-day scientific account of the Universe may find it impossible to believe that a living creature, once dead, can come to life again; but, if he did entertain this belief, he would be thinking more 'scientifically' if he thought in the Christian terms of a psychosomatic resurrection than if he thought in the shamanistic terms of a disembodied spirit.

==== Ray Bradbury's "The Toynbee Convector" ====
Another possible interpretation is that the Toynbee reference comes from the science fiction writer Ray Bradbury's short story "The Toynbee Convector", which alludes to Toynbee's idea that to survive, humankind must always rush to meet the future and believe in a better world, and must always aim far beyond what is practically possible, to achieve something barely within reach. Thus the message might be that humanity ought to strive to colonize Jupiter—as in Clarke's work—or something greater, to survive.

==== Arthur C. Clarke's "Jupiter V" ====
Arthur C. Clarke's short story "Jupiter V" involves a space ship named the Arnold Toynbee on a mission to Jupiter. It contains many ideas and concepts Clarke would later reuse when writing 2001.

==== David Mamet's "4 A.M." ====
Playwright David Mamet has spoken of his belief that the tiles are an homage to one of his plays, and has described it as "the weirdest thing that ever happened". In his 1983 work "4 A.M." (published in the collection Goldberg Street: Short Plays and Monologues in 1985), a radio host based on Larry King impatiently listens to a caller who contends that the movie 2001, based on the writings of Arnold Toynbee, speaks of the plan to reconstitute life on Jupiter. The radio show host quickly points out the factual errors in the caller's assertion and the logical fallacies of his plan.

Researchers for the 2011 documentary Resurrect Dead: The Mystery of the Toynbee Tiles claim to have uncovered several pieces of evidence that predate Mamet's play, including an actual 1980 call by the tiler to Larry King's radio show. They cite a 1983 article in The Philadelphia Inquirer which mentions a local man "contacting talk shows and newspapers to spread the message" about bringing the dead to life on Jupiter, as depicted in the film 2001.

== Potential creators ==
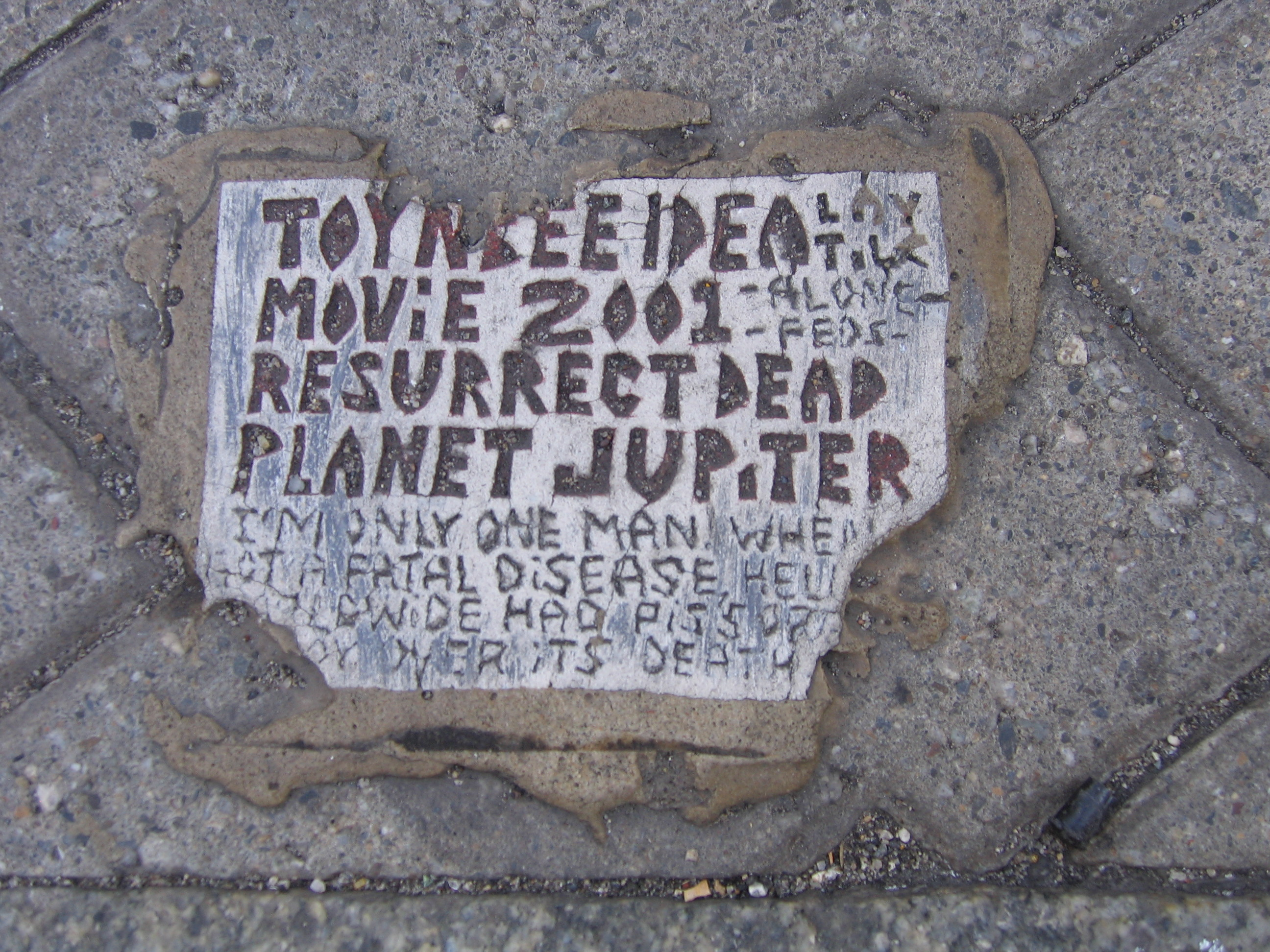
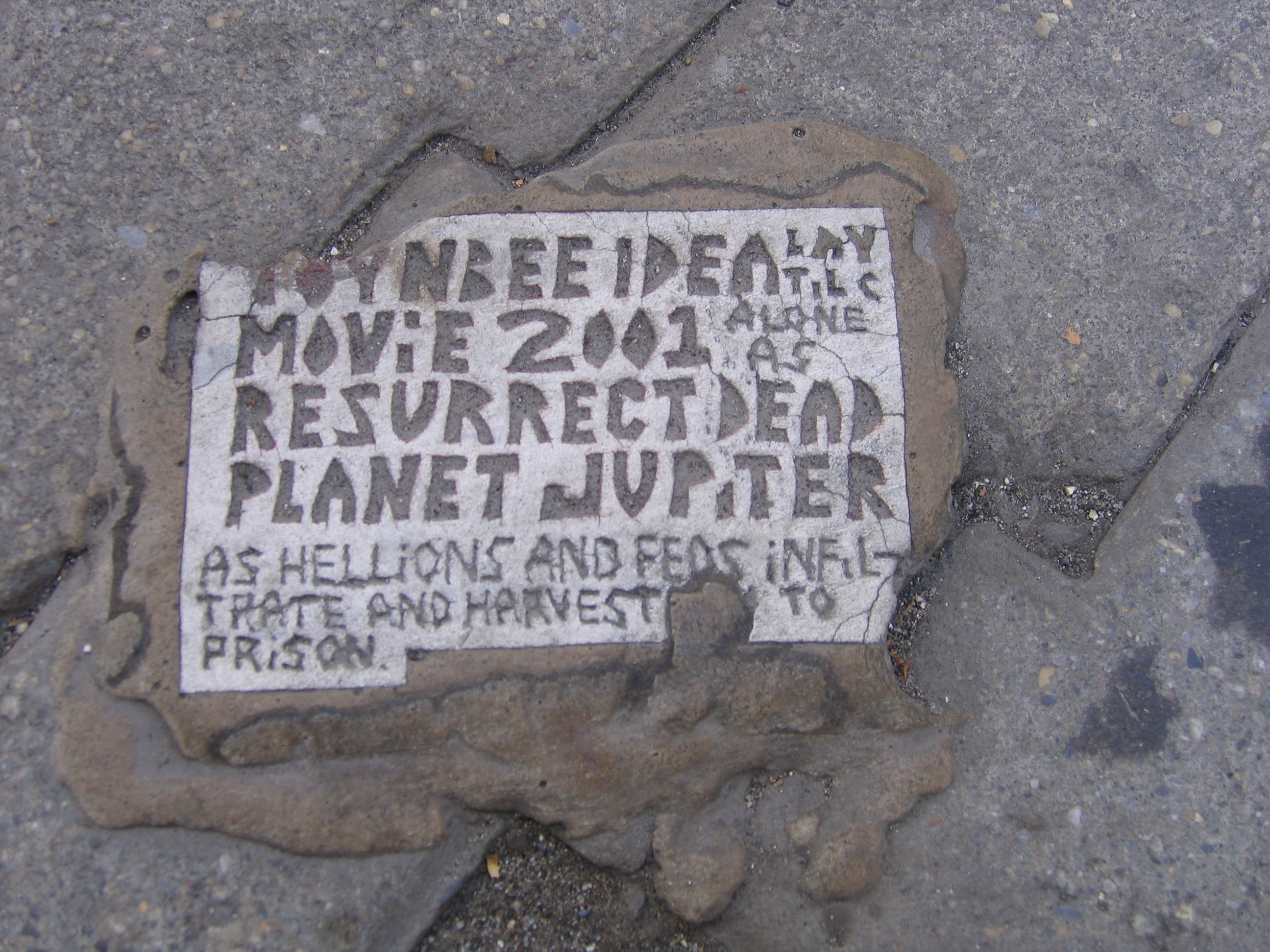
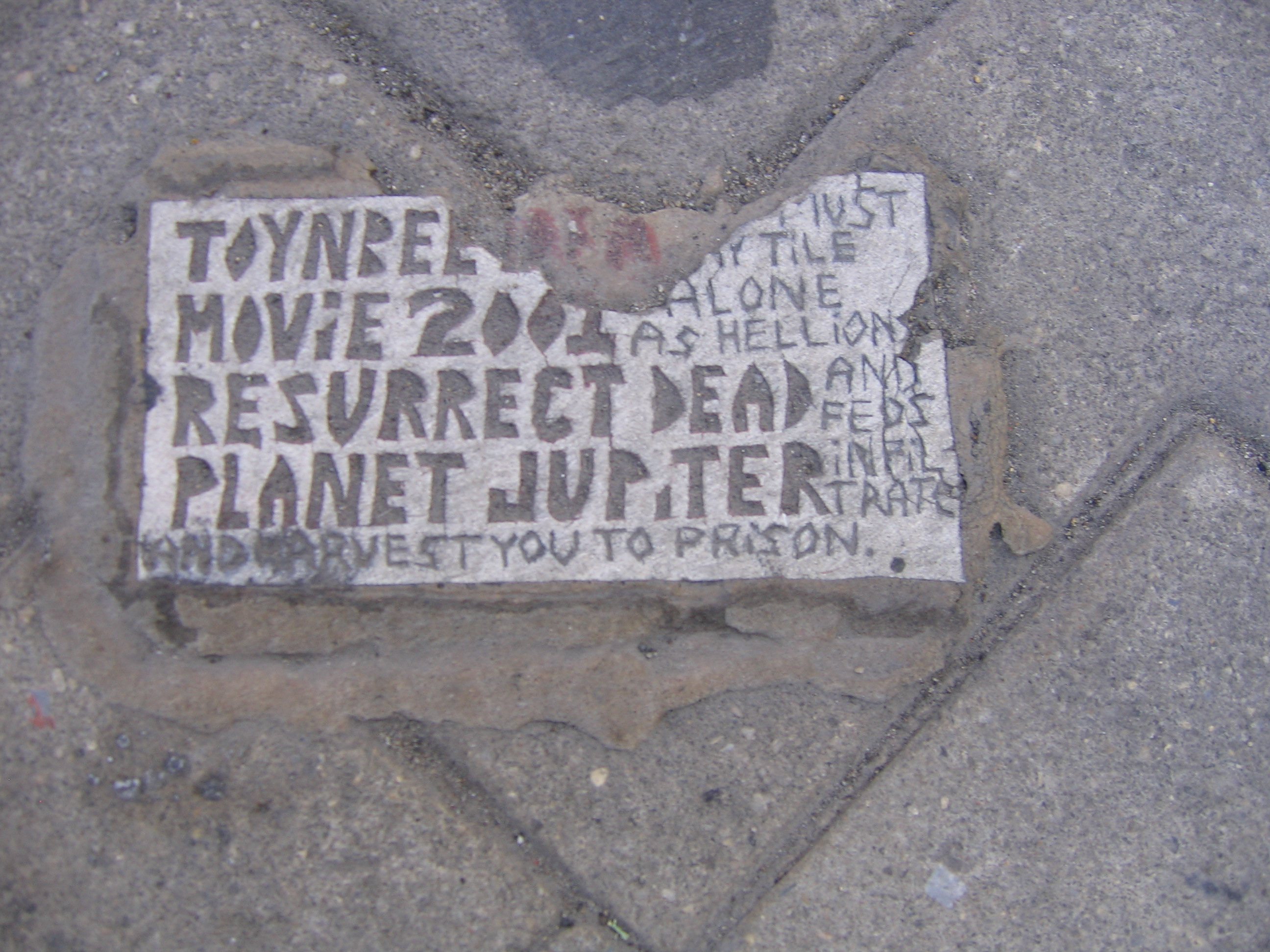
Three tiles placed on the Avenue of the Arts section of Broad Street in Philadelphia. The tiles are made of linoleum cemented onto normal-sized paving bricks.

In 1983, a man identifying himself as a social worker named James Morasco contacted talk shows and newspapers with his theory of colonizing Jupiter with the dead inhabitants of Earth, claiming to have come across the idea while reading a book by historian Arnold Toynbee. In a conversation with The Philadelphia Inquirer, Morasco discussed how Toynbee's book contained a theory on bringing dead molecules back to life and that this was later depicted in the movie 2001: A Space Odyssey. The caller had founded what the Inquirer called a "Jupiter colonization organization", known as the Minority Association.

In 1996, the Kansas City Star editor Doug Worgul discovered a "Toynbee Tile" at the corner of 13th and Grand in downtown Kansas City. Investigating the story seven years later, he found that the tile was still there, and he determined that the street had last been resurfaced in 1996. Comparing the tile to those in other cities, a local police detective felt that "clearly it was created by the same hand" and concluded that despite referring to a "movement", the creator was acting alone.

In 2003, Worgul called the only James Morasco in the Philadelphia telephone book and was told by the man's wife that her husband had died in March that year, aged 88. When asked about the tiles, Morasco's widow said that her husband "didn't know anything about it." Worgul doubted that this was the tile maker. Action News Philadelphia spoke to the widow of a man named James Joseph Morasco and identified him as a Philadelphia carpenter who had died in 2003, aged 87. His wife did not recognise the tiles and said her husband had had no interest in Jupiter. If Morasco had died at either age in 2003, he would have been in his seventies when most of the tiles were laid.

In the 2011 documentary Resurrect Dead: The Mystery of the Toynbee Tiles, artist and Toynbee Tile enthusiast Justin Duerr said that he considered the tiles to be the work of a single person and attributed them to the reclusive Philadelphia resident Severino "Sevy" Verna. Duerr believed Verna used the name "James Morasco" as an alias. The streets surrounding Verna's residence were littered with small "proto-tiles" that Duerr believed were tests, and ham radio enthusiasts reported Verna might have broadcast a message via short wave radio about his theories. Based on comments from Verna's neighbors about him driving a car without a passenger seat, Duerr suspected Verna placed the tiles through a hole in the floor of his car.

New tiles have been seen in Philadelphia since 2003. Between 2002 and 2007, many such tiles displayed a different font and styling than the older tiles and tended to leave out words that were found on the originals: "raise" is often substituted for "resurrect," and prepositions are frequently omitted. Beginning in 2007, tiles were discovered in Philadelphia that are quite similar to the original tiles, leading some to believe that everything has been the work of the same person throughout the life of the tile phenomenon. The font and message are the same as the old ones, and the subtext is a return to some of the older ideas as well. These tiles were glued with a thicker layer of asphalt glue or sealant than older ones.

== Usage ==
=== Deployment ===
Toynbee-tile enthusiast Justin Duerr claims to have once found and examined a newly installed tile. This new tile was wrapped in tar paper and placed on a busy street early in the morning. From this find and other evidence, Duerr believes that the pressure exerted by cars driving over the tile for weeks on end pushes the tile into the road surface. Eventually, the tar paper wears away, exposing the message.

=== Destruction, conservation, and public acknowledgment ===
Tiles that are located in the middle of busy streets and near traffic exchanges tend to quickly disintegrate due to normal traffic flow and road repair. In contrast, smaller tiles and those located closer to pedestrian crosswalks tend to be in better condition.

Hundreds of tiles have been destroyed during the course of regular road maintenance. The city of Chicago has declared the tiles "vandalism" and removes any tiles that it finds, considering them to be "no different than graffiti."

A large tile complex, the tile maker's apparent rant against his enemies, was destroyed when Chestnut Street in Philadelphia was repaved. One tile has been damaged and unreadable since 1996. It is located at the corners of Talcahuano and Santa Fé streets in Buenos Aires, Argentina.

There is no public or private agency dedicated to conserving Toynbee tiles. Many tiles now exist only as photographs taken before their destruction. The tiles have enjoyed attention from American and European media outlets, including from The New York Times, The Chicago Sun-Times, Spiegel Online, and NPR. In 2011, Philadelphia-based filmmakers Justin Duerr, Jon Foy, Colin Smith, and Steve Weinik released Resurrect Dead: The Mystery of the Toynbee Tiles, an independent documentary film about the tiles. The film was selected for the 2011 Sundance Film Festival in the U.S. Documentary category, and Foy won the category's Directing Award.

As of October 2015, the Streets Department of Philadelphia recognizes Toynbee Tiles as street art, and "will save one or two of the Toynbee Tiles only if there is a fast and affordable method for removing them."

== See also ==
- Culture jamming – Form of protest to subvert media culture
- Graffiti – Drawings and paintings on surfaces
- Sticker art – Type of street art
- Schuylkill notes – Circulated pieces of paper outlining conspiracy theories
