= The Ray Bradbury Theater =

American television anthology series (1985–1992)

- Created by: Ray Bradbury
- Starring: Ray Bradbury; Miscellaneous special guests
- Theme music composer: John Massari
- Countries of origin: United States; Canada; New Zealand; France; Australia; United Kingdom
- No. of seasons: 6
- No. of episodes: 65 (list of episodes)

Production
- Running time: 23–28 minutes

Original release
- Network: First Choice Superchannel / HBO (seasons 1); USA Network (seasons 2–6)
- Release: May 21, 1985 – October 30, 1992

The Ray Bradbury Theatre is an anthology series that ran for three seasons on First Choice Superchannel in Canada and HBO in the United States from 1985 to 1986, and then on USA Network, running for four additional seasons from 1988 to 1992; episodes aired on the Global Television Network in Canada from 1991 to 1994. It was shown in reruns on the Sci Fi Channel and later on the Retro Television Network. It might be airing on Comet and may be available on Amazon Prime Video, Peacock, Pluto TV and The Roku Channel.

== Overview ==
All 65 episodes were written solely by Ray Bradbury, based on short stories or novels he wrote, including "A Sound of Thunder", "Marionettes, Inc.", "Banshee", "The Playground", "Mars is Heaven", "Usher II", "The Jar", "The Long Rain", "The Veldt", "The Small Assassin", "The Pedestrian", "The Fruit at the Bottom of the Bowl", "Here There Be Tygers", "The Toynbee Convector", and "Sun and Shadow".

Many of the episodes focused on only one of Bradbury's original works. However, Bradbury occasionally included elements from his other works. "Marionettes, Inc." featured Fantoccini, a character from "I Sing the Body Electric!". "Gotcha!" included an opening sequence taken from "The Laurel and Hardy Love Affair". Characters were renamed, and elements added to the original works to expand the story to 23–28 minutes or to better suit the television medium.

Each episode would begin with a shot of Bradbury in his office, gazing over mementos of his life, which he states (in narrative) are used to spark ideas for stories. During the first season, Bradbury sometimes appeared on-screen in brief vignettes introducing the story. During the second season, Bradbury provided the opening narration with no specific embellishment concerning the episode. During the third season, a foreshortened version of the narration was used and Bradbury would add specific comments relevant to the episode presented. During the fourth and later seasons, a slightly shorter generic narration was used with no additional comments.

Actors appearing in the series included Richard Kiley, Shelley Duvall, Paul Le Mat, Eileen Brennan, Donald Pleasence, Denholm Elliott, Alan Bates, James Coco, William Shatner, Peter O'Toole, Patrick Macnee, Susannah York, Jeff Goldblum, Drew Barrymore, Hal Linden, Michael Ironside, Robert Vaughn, Eugene Levy, Saul Rubinek, Louise Fletcher, Paul Gross, David Ogden Stiers, John Saxon, Timothy Bottoms, Harold Gould, Sally Kirkland, Kiel Martin, Bruce Weitz, Barry Morse, Eddie Albert, David Carradine, Sally Kellerman, Vincent Gardenia, Robert Culp, Shawn Ashmore, Richard Benjamin, John Vernon, Elliott Gould, Tyne Daly, Lucy Lawless, Jean Stapleton, Charles Martin Smith, Marc Singer, Michael Hurst, Magali Noël, Joanna Cassidy, John Glover, Dan O'Herlihy, Howard Hesseman, Leslie Nielsen, Helen Shaver, Ian Bannen, Megan Follows, Michael Sarrazin, Roy Kinnear, Kenneth Welsh, Michael J. Pollard, Pat Harrington, Jr., Carol Kane, Gordon Pinsent, Clive Swift, Len Cariou, Gregory Sierra, Nick Mancuso, Ben Cross, Janice Rule, Robert Joy, Ray Sharkey, Cyril Cusack, Stuart Margolin, Ronald Lacey, Jayne Eastwood, Wayne Robson, Grant Tilly and James Whitmore.

In the United States, HBO originally aired the show for its first season, then it was moved to the USA Network from its second season onwards.

== Episodes ==
Season	Episodes	Originally released		
Season	Episodes	First released	Last released	Network
1	6	May 21, 1985	February 22, 1986	HBO
2	12	January 23, 1988	May 28, 1988	USA Network
3	12	July 7, 1989	November 17, 1989	USA Network
4	12	July 20, 1990	November 30, 1990	USA Network
5	8	January 3, 1992	February 21, 1992	USA Network
6	15	July 10, 1992	October 30, 1992	USA Network

== Reception ==
The series was praised by Paul Brazier in 1996.
