= World Security Workshop =

World Security Workshop was an anthology series on the ABC radio network, presented by United World Federalists, and its predecessor Americans United for World Government. Twenty-six half-hour episodes were broadcast between 14 November 1946 and 8 May 1947. ABC Radio Vice President Robert Saudek produced the series.

The most notable writers for World Security Workshop were Ray Bradbury, whose script for the episode The Meadow was published in the book The Best One-Act Plays of 1947-1948 and later adapted into a short story; Franklin Schaffner, a spokesperson and copywriter for Americans United for World Government, who would later direct the films Planet of the Apes and Patton; and Broadway composer Irving Caesar, whose musical episode "Sing a Song of Friendship" promoted world unity and peace.
