= Schuylkill notes =

Circulated pieces of paper outlining conspiracy theories

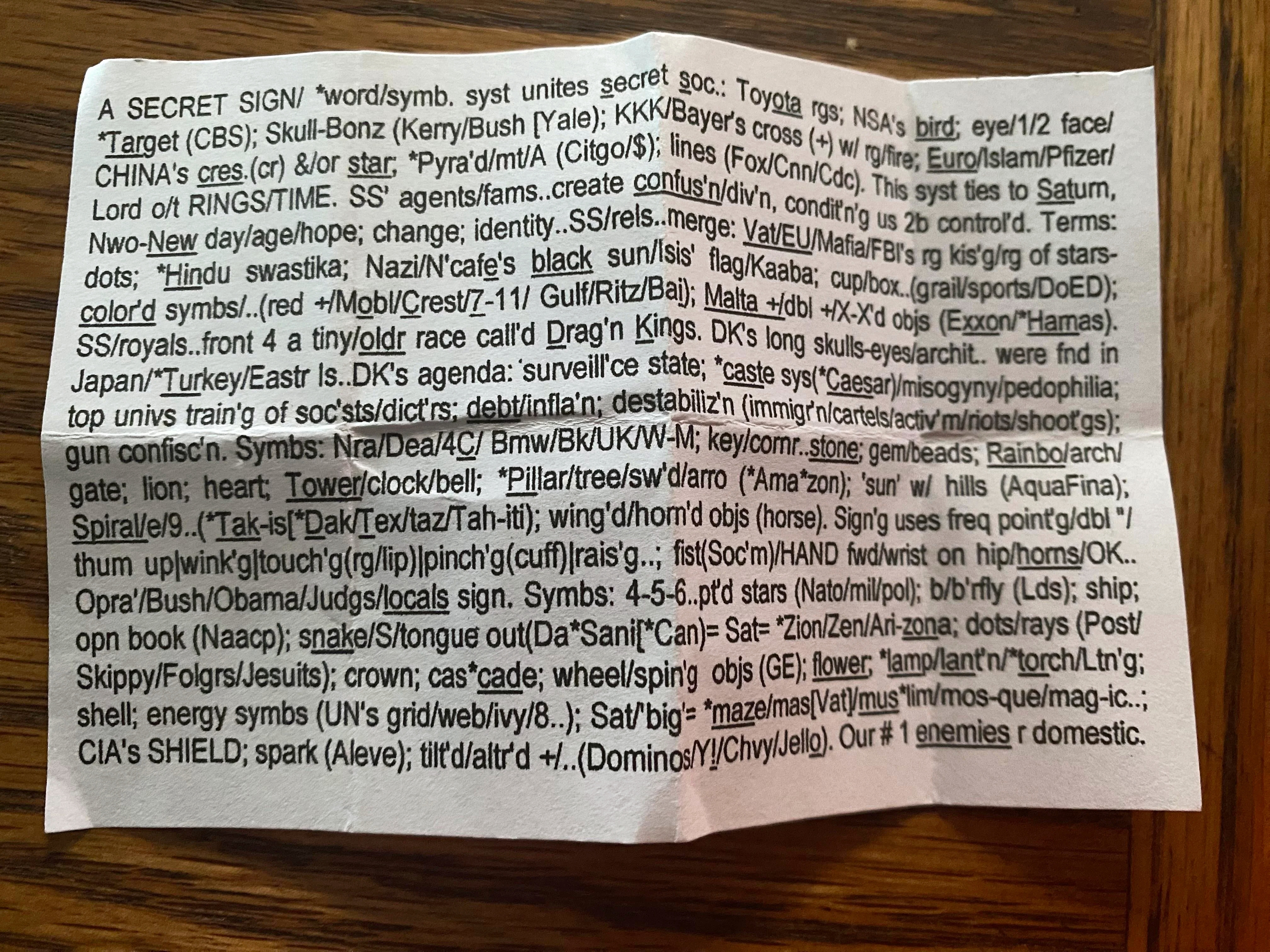
Example of a Schuylkill note found in February 2024

Schuylkill notes are small pieces of paper with symbolism-oriented conspiracy theories printed on them which have appeared in many locations in the United States in different forms. Authorship of the notes is unknown, with them often being found inside food packaging, hanging from trees along hiking trails, and state parks. They have been discovered primarily in northeastern and central Pennsylvania.

== History ==
The earliest social media report of a found note was in 2019, and news media reported their existence in 2020. However, some reports indicate that similar notes appeared as early as 2015.

In 2020, the majority of the notes were reportedly discovered within the packaging of food products purchased from grocery stores in Schuylkill County, Pennsylvania; thus, they were named "Schuylkill notes".

After a report on 28/22 News in December 2023, emails and phone calls were made to law enforcement about the notes, with many reporting them as being found in sealed food packages and beauty products. Local, state, and federal authorities initiated investigations, including the Food and Drug Administration, due to food tampering being a federal crime in the United States. Congressmen Dan Meuser and Matt Cartwright expressed their concern about the notes worrying the public. A crowdsourced Google Map suggests that at least 139 individual notes have been discovered as of February 2024.

A Reddit community, r/schuylkillnotes, exists to discuss the notes.

== Description ==
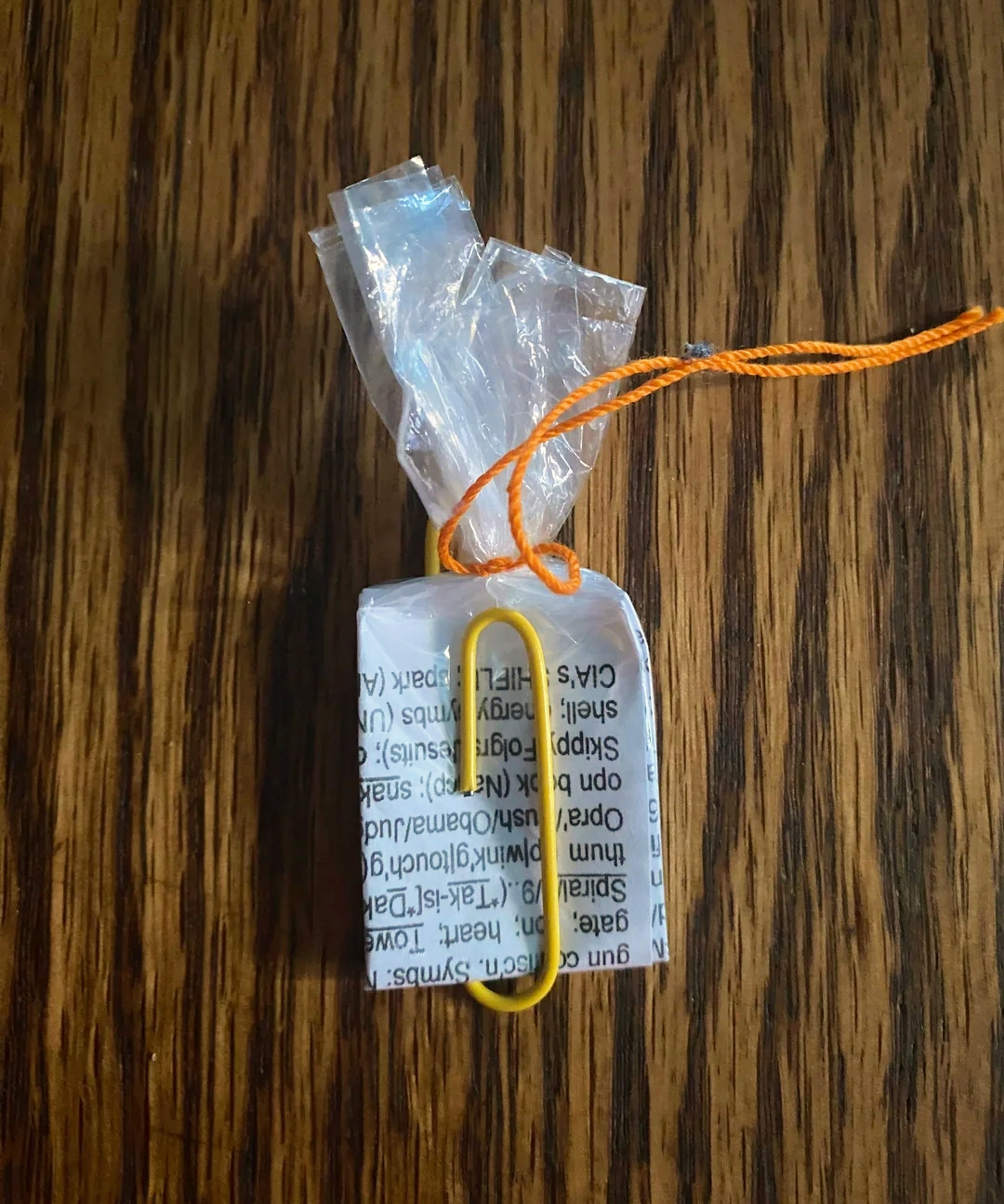
A Schuylkill note found attached to a tree branch in February 2024, still in its original packaging

The notes are pieces of paper sized approximately 2 by 3 inches. They are found folded in product packaging, the pockets of store bought clothes, or packed into plastic bags closed with a string and attached to trees along trails. Messages printed on Schuylkill notes vary greatly. They usually contain 19 lines of text printed in narrow writing, commonly linking symbolism from business, culture, nations, history and government to secret societies, and seeming to combine multiple conspiracy theories, purporting that secret societies have a global level of influence. Some Schuylkill notes have large corners of the paper taken up by one word – typically "lies" – written in all caps with a larger text size.

Governmental themes appearing in the notes include the New World Order conspiracy theory, Nazism, the CIA, the FBI, the federal judiciary of the United States, the European Union, the World Bank, Hamas, Vladimir Putin, John F. Kennedy, Barack Obama, Donald Trump, the British royal family, the Dalai Lama, "Dragon Kings", and the pope. Popular media, celebrities and companies mentioned on the notes include Disney, Fox News, CNN, Google, Bing, Pfizer, AstraZeneca, Bayer, Ford, Toyota, Audi, Mazda, BMW, Subaru, Pillsbury, Aquafina, Folgers, Nescafe, Domino's, Exxon, Sunoco, The Lord of the Rings, Oprah Winfrey and Elon Musk.

== Locations ==
They have been discovered in a variety of products such as Lucky Charms, Lindt chocolate, Nature's Path Panda Puffs, Belvita cookies, Milk Duds, Hot Tamales candy, Duncan Hines cake mix, and Tylenol medication. The products containing the notes were purchased in multiple grocery stores such as Walmart, Target, Giant, Weis Markets, Wegmans, Trader Joe's, Dollar General, CVS, Kohl's, Goodwill, Lowe's, Cabela's and Aldi.

== See also ==
- Markovian Parallax Denigrate
- Toynbee tiles – Messages of unknown origin found embedded in asphalt of streets
