= The Wilderness (short story) =

1952 short story by Ray Bradbury

"The Wilderness" is a science fiction short story by Ray Bradbury first published in the November 1952 issue of The Magazine of Fantasy and Science Fiction, and included in Bradbury's 1953 collection The Golden Apples of the Sun.

The year is 2003, and Janice and Leonora are spending their last days on Earth before leaving for Mars to join Janice's husband Will. While having mixed feelings at first, Janice slowly reveals throughout the story that she is more and more willing to join her husband on Mars while still lamenting about leaving behind all that is on Earth. Janice and Leonora also lament on the second-hand role played by women in exploration and similar situations (i.e. conquest of Western America).

== Reception ==
In The Magazine of Fantasy & Science Fiction (1953), Anthony Boucher and J. Francis McComas described the story as one Bradbury's best works, a "heartwarming picture of the girls we can never leave behind us, whatever far boundaries we reach".
