= Frost and Fire (short story) =

1946 short story by Ray Bradbury

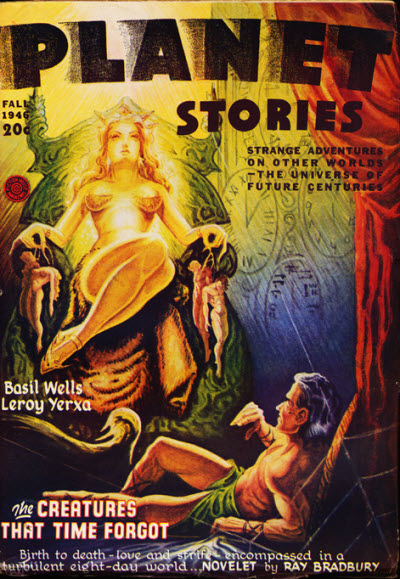
"Frost and Fire" (as "The Creatures That Time Forgot") was cover-featured on the Fall 1946 issue of Planet Stories.

"Frost and Fire" is a short story by Ray Bradbury and the fourteenth in his collection R is for Rocket. It was first published in Planet Stories (Fall, 1946) as "The Creatures That Time Forgot". The story is about short-lived humans on a planet similar to Mercury.

== Plot summary ==
Placed there by a past rocket ship that crashed, the people of the storied land are within sight of another rocket ship on a distant mountain plateau. The plot follows Sim, the protagonist of this story, and his apparently short life on a planet where people are cursed by radiation to live only eight days.

The people of this planet are also gifted with racial memory (they remember their ancestors' memories). However, they do not attempt to reach the sole remaining rocket ship due to the futility of attempting to reach it in one hour, which is the longest length of time between day and night (both deadly).

Sim is then moved by the memory of his ancestors to find and meet with scientists who make halting progress towards the goal of lengthening the world's decreased life span. Sim, motivated by his dwindling days, makes it his goal to extend his life and reach the distant rocket, despite the protests of his sister and other cave-dwellers.

== Characters ==
Sim: The story's protagonist of the story. He is intelligent, resourceful, and selfless. He pursues a distant seed ship, left behind by the planet's first settlers, out of curiosity and a strong desire to improve the cave people's lives.

Lyte: Sim's love interest. She is strong, independent, and assists Sim both in war and on the harrowing journey towards the seed ship.

Dark: Sim's older sister. She dissuades him from traveling to the rocket ship, and greets him days later upon his return to the home cave.

Chion: Sim's enemy from his home cave. He and Sim first fight when he steals a berry from Sim. During a war with members of the better cliff, he deliberately wounds Sim to improve his odds of becoming Lyte's mate.

Nhoj: The challenger from the better cliffs who volunteers to fight Sim for a place in the caves.

Dienc: The lead Scientist who helps Sim try to understand the seed ship.

== Graphic novel adaptation ==
"Frost and Fire" was adapted as a graphic novel. It is the third in the DC Science Fiction Graphic Novel series, by Klaus Janson in 1985.

== Film adaptation ==
An independent short film Quest, based on "Frost and Fire" and directed by Elaine and Saul Bass, was released in 1983.

In 2024 it was announced a live action feature film adaptation was in the works, with a screenplay written by Doug Simon.
