= The April Witch =

1952 short story by Ray Bradbury

- Short story by Ray Bradbury
- Country: United States
- Language: English
- Genre: Fantasy

Publication
- Published in: The Saturday Evening Post
- Publication type: Newspaper, Magazine
- Media type: Print
- Publication date: 5 April 1952

"The April Witch" is a 1952 fantasy short story by American writer Ray Bradbury.

== Plot summary ==
Cecy Elliott is a 17-year-old girl born into a magical family. She has the ability to assimilate with other living plants or animals. Purely benevolent and innocent in nature, Cecy tells her parents that she wishes to feel love, despite their warning that she will lose her magical abilities if she falls in love with a human. She accepts the risk and voyages to visit and drop into a girl, Ann. She within Ann goes to attend a dance with Tom, who had previously been involved with Ann. Tom is aware of Ann's inconsistent behaviour during the dance, and begins to see Cecy through the disguise. At the end, Cecy finds herself believing Tom is worth losing her powers, and so manages to communicate to him to come find her as she leaves Ann. The story ends with Tom’s fingers curling on a paper with Cecy’s address that she managed to write while in Ann’s form.

== Reception ==
Boucher and McComas described the story as one of Bradbury's "reassuringly lovely flights of fancy".

== Publication history ==
The story was included in several of Bradbury's short story collections:

- The Golden Apples of the Sun, 1953
- Twice 22, 1966
- The Stories of Ray Bradbury, 1980
- Ray Bradbury Collected Short Stories, 2001

This story was later assimilated into Bradbury's 2003 fix-up novel From the Dust Returned.
