= One More for the Road (short story collection) =

2002 collection of short stories by Ray Bradbury

- dust-jacket from the first edition
- Author: Ray Bradbury
- Cover artist: José Luis Merino
- Language: English
- Genre: Science fiction, fantasy
- Publisher: William Morrow
- Publication date: April, 2002
- Publication place: United States
- Media type: Print (hardback)
- Pages: 289 pp
- ISBN: 0-06-621106-9
- OCLC: 46952194
- Dewey Decimal: 813/.54 21
- LC Class: PS3503.R167 O54 2002

One More for the Road is a 2002 collection of 25 short stories written by Ray Bradbury.

== Contents ==
1. "First Day"
2. "Heart Transplant"
3. "Quid Pro Quo"
4. "After the Ball"
5. "In Memoriam"
6. "Téte-á-Téte"
7. "The Dragon Danced at Midnight"
8. "The Nineteenth"
9. "Beasts"
10. "Autumn Afternoon"
11. "Where All Is Emptiness There Is Room to Move"
12. "One-Woman Show"
13. "The Laurel and Hardy Alpha Centauri Farewell Tour"
14. "Leftovers"
15. "One More for the Road"
16. "Tangerine"
17. "With Smiles as Wide as Summer"
18. "Time Intervening"
19. "The Enemy in the Wheat"
20. "Fore!"
21. "My Son, Max"
22. "The F.Scott/Tolstoy/Ahab Accumulator"
23. "Well, What Do You Have to Say for Yourself?"
24. "Diane de Forét"
25. "The Cricket on the Hearth"
26. Afterword: Metaphors, the Breakfast of Champions
