= Here There Be Tygers =

1951 short story by Ray Bradbury

- Short story by Ray Bradbury
- Country: United States
- Language: English

Publication
- Published in: New Tales of Space and Time
- Media type: Print
- Publication date: 1951

"Here There Be Tygers" is a short story by American writer Ray Bradbury, originally published in the anthology New Tales of Space and Time in 1951. It was later collected in Bradbury's short story collections R is for Rocket and The Golden Apples of the Sun.

== Plot summary ==
A rocket expedition is sent to a planet to see whether or not its natural resources can be harvested for the human race. They discover a paradise which seems to provide for them whatever they desire even as they think of it. They ultimately decide to leave the planet and report that it is hostile and of no benefit to humans.

== Adaptations ==
A teleplay of this story was written by Bradbury for possible use on the television program The Twilight Zone, but Rod Serling and the producers of the show deemed it too expensive to film. This led to the end of Ray Bradbury's brief association with the show, which resulted in just one of his stories ("I Sing the Body Electric") being used. It was later produced as a radio episode of the series Bradbury 13 (June 18, 1984) and the television program Ray Bradbury Theater (November 30, 1990).

A Soviet animated adaptation of the story (in Russian:Здесь могут водиться тигры, Zdes mogut voditsya tigry, ru) was produced in 1989, with the plot change that one of the men wishes to harvest the resources and leave, to the point where he sets an anti-matter bomb to blow the planet up. The planet promptly summons an eponymous tiger to kill him, whilst the captain takes the bomb on board their spaceship and takes off, although not before one of the men sneaks off to live on the planet. The navigator tells the captain of this, saying it is not too late to turn back and get him, but the captain reveals the bomb, stating that it is too late, and to plot a course as far away as possible. The story ends with the planet giving the remaining astronaut a new pet dog, as well as the promise of a female companion. The movie was directed by Vladimir Samsonov.

== Similar stories in popular culture ==
The basic concept is also reminiscent of Ray Bradbury's 1948 short story "Mars Is Heaven!".

The Danish-American science fiction film Journey to the Seventh Planet (1962) involves astronauts exploring a planet where their memories and desires materialize before them. This turns out to be an elaborate illusion created by a powerful alien entity living in a cavern.

In the original Star Trek episode "Shore Leave", a crew finds a planet where any of their desires once thought are acted out in real life. This is due to an alien life-form's superior technology, as the planet is actually an alien amusement park. The crew eventually comes to relax on the planet before continuing on their journey. This episode aired in 1966, fifteen years after Ray Bradbury's story was first published.
