= Banshee (short story) =

1984 short story by Ray Bradbury

- Short story by Ray Bradbury

Publication
- Published in: Gallery
- Publication type: Periodical
- Media type: Magazine
- Publication date: 1984

"Banshee" is an autobiographical short story written by Ray Bradbury in the September 1984 issue of Gallery and later adapted by Bradbury as an episode of Ray Bradbury Theater. The story is based on Bradbury's experiences with John Huston during pre-production of their film Moby Dick, directed by Huston and adapted into a screenplay by Bradbury from Herman Melville's novel.

Bradbury and Huston had a very unpleasant working relationship whenever Bradbury would visit Huston's house in Ireland, where Huston would routinely manipulate and torment Bradbury with insults, pranks, and attempts to frighten the young author with impromptu ghost stories.

In "Banshee", director John Hampton and writer Douglas Rogers share an identical relationship (Hampton is a vain egotistical sadistic nasty prankster movie director). However, Bradbury puts a supernatural twist into the story by making one of John's ghostly tales true; unbeknownst to John, his property in the Irish country-side really is haunted by a banshee, a wailing female spirit. Despite his fear, Doug converses with the ghost, who has mistaken John for William, a former resident of the house who was her unfaithful lover when she was alive centuries before and vows to take him into eternity. Angered by John's cruel behavior earlier in the evening, Doug returns to the house and goads John into venturing into the night to meet the banshee, knowing that she intends to kill John/William. At the last minute, Doug has second thoughts and unsuccessfully tries to convince John not to meet the banshee; however, John laughs off the warning and goes outside to confront her anyway. Outside the closed door can be heard the banshee's scream of triumph.

The television adaptation stars Charles Martin Smith as Doug (the Bradbury character) and Peter O'Toole as John (the character based on Huston).
