= S Is for Space =

1966 collection of science fiction short stories by Ray Bradbury

S is for Space
- Dust-jacket from the first edition
- Author: Ray Bradbury
- Language: English
- Genre: Science fiction
- Publisher: Doubleday & Company
- Publication date: 1966
- Publication place: United States
- Media type: Print (hardback)
- Pages: 239 pp
- Preceded by: R Is for Rocket

S is for Space (1966) is a collection of science fiction short stories written by Ray Bradbury. It was compiled for the Young Adult sections of libraries.

== Contents ==
"Chrysalis"
A science fiction story in which three men anxiously watch their fellow-scientist as he is encased in a mysterious green chrysalis. They eventually come to believe he is undergoing metamorphosis inside the chrysalis.

"Pillar of Fire"
A science fiction/horror short novel. Set in the year 2349, it depicts a Utopian society in which all corpses are incinerated for hygienic reasons. All horror literature has also been burned to produce a healthier mindset. When his grave is disturbed, a man who died four centuries earlier rises from his tomb to infiltrate the utopia and launch a vendetta to restore fear.

"Zero Hour"
A science fiction story, involving a world-wide befriending of children by sinister aliens.

"The Man"
A rocket ship lands on an isolated planet, expecting an astounded welcome. However, they find they have been preceded by a much more important visitor.

"Time in Thy Flight"
A science fiction story. A high-school teacher takes three children on a field-trip in a time machine.

"The Pedestrian"
A science fiction story about a society addicted to television.

"Hail and Farewell"
A fantasy story concerning a middle-aged man who never physically aged past his pre-adolescence.

"Invisible Boy"
A comical story about an old woman who convinces a boy she has turned him invisible.

"Come into My Cellar"
A science fiction story about mushrooms and alien invasions.

"The Million-Year Picnic"
A science fiction story in which a family travels to an unsullied Mars to escape a ravaged Earth. Previously adapted as the final chapter of The Martian Chronicles (1950).

"The Screaming Woman"
A mystery/suspense story, describing a young girl who tries to procure help in digging up a woman buried in an empty lot.

"The Smile"
A science fiction story describing a world devastated by nuclear war, whose inhabitants systematically destroy artifacts of the past. The story touches on one boy who is enchanted by Leonardo da Vinci's Mona Lisa.

"Dark They Were, and Golden-Eyed"
An atomic war on Earth drives a family to flee to a human colony Mars.

"The Trolley"
An idyllic story about the last trolley-ride in a small town.

"The Flying Machine"
A story set in ancient China, whose Emperor discovers a peasant has invented a flying-machine.

"Icarus Montgolfier Wright"
A story concerning the first man to fly a rocket ship.
