= The Dragon Who Ate His Tail =

Book by Ray Bradbury

- Cover of the first edition
- Author: Ray Bradbury
- Language: English
- Genre: Science fiction, fantasy, horror
- Published: (4 January 2007) Gauntlet Press
- Publication place: United States
- Media type: Print (paperback)
- Pages: 72
- ISBN: 1-887368-91-4
- OCLC: 122263193

The Dragon Who Ate His Tail is a collection of short stories, screenplay fragments and manuscript facsimiles by American writer Ray Bradbury. It was published by Gauntlet Press in 2007 as a chapbook. The title story was previously unpublished.

== Contents ==
- "The Dragon Who Ate His Tail"
- "To the Future"
- screenplay pages for "The Fox and the Forest"
- "Sometime Before Dawn"
- "Sometime Before Dawn" (facsimile)
