= The Toynbee Convector =

Short story by Ray Bradbury

- Short story by Ray Bradbury
- Cover of a reprint of The Toynbee Convector, which collects the story.
- Country: United States
- Language: English
- Genre: science fiction

Publication
- Published in: Playboy
- Publication type: Periodical
- Media type: Print (Magazine)
- Publication date: January 1984

"The Toynbee Convector" is a science fiction short story by American writer Ray Bradbury. First published in Playboy magazine in 1984, the story was subsequently featured in a 1988 short story collection also titled The Toynbee Convector.

== Plot summary ==
Roger Shumway, a reporter, is invited to visit Craig Bennett Stiles, a 130-year-old man also known as the Time Traveler. This is the first interview Stiles has granted since after his return from the future, 100 years earlier. Stiles had claimed then that he invented a time machine (which he privately refers to as his Toynbee Convector, although he does not reveal the name of the device to anyone until much later). Stiles used the machine to travel forward in time about a hundred years from what was an economically and creatively stagnant society (c. 1984). On returning to that present, he showed evidence — films and other records collected on his journey — showing that humanity developed an advanced civilization with many marvelous and helpful inventions, and a restored natural environment. He also claimed to have then destroyed the machine deliberately to prevent anyone else doing the same.

Initially, people were skeptical of the Traveler's claims, but they are unable to explain or disprove the authenticity of the records brought from the future. Inspired by the prospect of a utopian future, many people began projects to fulfill the vision and create the world the Traveler claims to have seen.

A hundred years later, the perfect world of Stiles' visions has come to pass, just as he saw in his time travel. Now 130 years old, Stiles recounts the story to Shumway. Stiles calmly reveals what really happened, simply stating, "I lied." Since he knew the people of the world had it in them to create a utopia, he created the illusion of one, to give humanity a goal, and hope. Because of people's belief in the illusion, the imagined utopian future became reality. After explaining his actions, Stiles presents Shumway with the evidence of his fraud on several recorded tapes and cassettes. Stiles then steps into a machine of his own creation, which he calls "a real time machine". Turning the machine on, electricity pulses through it and Stiles' body, taking his life. Shumway is then left with the decision to either reveal Stiles' deception to the world or destroy the evidence, thus perpetuating Stiles' utopian tale. Turning the machine on once again, in order to destroy it, Shumway quietly drops the evidence into an incinerator set into the wall nearby and exits Stiles' home via a glass elevator.

== Adaptation/ origin of title ==
Within the story, Stiles says that he chose the name "Toynbee Convector" for his machine, being inspired by "a historian named Toynbee":

... that fine historian who said any group, any race, any world that did not run to seize the future and shape it was doomed to dust away to the grave, in the past.

This is a reference to Arnold J. Toynbee, who proposed that civilisation must respond to a challenge in order to flourish. This allusion is made more explicit in the television adaptation, written by Bradbury himself for The Ray Bradbury Theater. In this adaptation, first broadcast in 1990, Stiles refers to Toynbee by his full name and quotes directly from the author. The episode starred James Whitmore (as Stiles) and Michael Hurst (as Roger Shumway).

== See also ==
- Self-fulfilling prophecy
- Tlön, Uqbar, Orbis Tertius
- Toynbee tiles
