= The Golden Kite, the Silver Wind =

Short story by Ray Bradbury

"The Golden Kite, The Silver Wind" (1953) is a short story by Ray Bradbury, one of his collection The Golden Apples of the Sun.

The story was published during the Cold War, and serves as an allegory to the nuclear arms race between the United States and the Soviet Union.

== Plot summary ==
The story, set in China, begins in a small pastoral town or village, apparently in a time or place where trade and agriculture are still the norm. There is little in the way of modern technology; no electricity, automobile or advanced irrigation. Superstition is also rampant. The town is described as being in a desert area, and within the vicinity of another, called Kwan-Si. The inhabitants of the town the story is set in are prone to describe their town to be in the shape of an orange, defined by the city walls.

One day, a messenger comes to the Mandarin, or king, to inform him that the neighboring town has changed the shape of their walls to a pig – such that it would be interpreted by travelers as being about to eat the orange-shaped town. The messenger and the king discuss frantically how this will bring them ill luck – travelers would stay in and trade with the other town, and nature will favor the pig over the orange. Advised by his daughter, who stands behind a silken screen to hide herself, the king decides to have the town walls rebuilt to resemble a club, with which to beat the pig away. All is well in the town for a time, but soon the messenger brings news that Kwan-Si's walls have been reshaped as a bonfire to burn their club. The Mandarin of the first town has the walls changed to a shining lake; Kwan-Si's are changed to Mouth to drink the lake; the Mandarin's changed to a needle to sew the mouth; Kwan-Si's to a sword to break the needle. This goes on for quite some time, driving the cities' inhabitants away from their work at farms or in shops to fruitlessly rebuild the walls and wait for the other's response. Disease and famine are rampant. At last, the voice behind the silk screen, advising the Mandarin, says weakly "In the Name of the gods, send for Kwan-Si!"

The two Mandarins, both starved and ailing, agree to stop their feud of superstition. The first Mandarin's daughter shows the men several kites, lying abandoned on the ground. 'What are kites', she asks, 'without the wind to sustain them and make them beautiful?' Nothing, they agree. 'And what is the sky, without kites upon its face to make it beautiful?' Again, it is Nothing. Thus, she directs that Kwan-Si shall make itself to resemble the Silver Wind, and her town shall be made to resemble a Golden Kite, such that the two should sustain each other and they could live in peace.
