= Sun and Shadow (short story) =

1953 short story by Ray Bradbury

- Short story by Ray Bradbury
- Country: United States
- Language: English
- Genre: Short story

Publication
- Published in: The Reporter
- Publication type: Periodical
- Media type: Print (Magazine)
- Publication date: 17 March 1953

"Sun and Shadow" is a short story by Ray Bradbury first published in 1953 in the American news magazine The Reporter. Later that same year, Bradbury anthologized it in The Golden Apples of the Sun.

In 1957, Quenian Press published a limited edition of 90 copies of the story for members of the Roxburghe Club of San Francisco.

"Sun and Shadow" was one of Bradbury's short stories adapted into an episode of the television series The Ray Bradbury Theater. In the episode, which aired on October 3, 1992, the title is misspelled "Shaddow" both on-screen and on the DVD menu.

== Plot summary ==
A man named Ricardo objects when a photographer uses the exterior of his house for a photo shoot. Ricardo becomes angry about the photo shooting and intervenes to prevent it. He goes to desperate measures to show the photographer that he does not want his house in the photo shoot. He goes to the extent where he takes off his clothes so that the photographer wouldn't use the house in the photo shoot. He eventually gets his way, and makes a few great points while at it.
