= The Long Rain =

Short story by Ray Bradbury

- Short story by Ray Bradbury
- Original title: Death-by-Rain
- Country: United States of America
- Language: English
- Genre: Science fiction

Publication
- Published in: Planet Stories
- Publication type: Short story
- Publication date: 23 September 1950

"The Long Rain" is a science fiction short story by American writer Ray Bradbury. This story was originally published in 1950 under a different title in the magazine Planet Stories, and then in the collection The Illustrated Man. The story tells of four men who have crashed on Venus, where it is always raining.

The story was republished in several collections and was incorporated into a film also titled The Illustrated Man.

== Plot ==
A lieutenant leads three other survivors of a rocket crash — Simmons, Pickard, and another man — through a gray Venusian jungle in endless heavy rain that renders them sleepless and nervous. Their goal is a Sun Dome, a rest and supply station warmed by a miniature sun, but after a month they find that they have made a circle back to the crash site where they arrived. An immense electrical storm approaches and the men hunker down to avoid its lightning. The unidentified man jumps up in panic and is electrocuted as he runs.

The three remaining men make their way to a Sun Dome, but find that it has been destroyed by Venusians. They eat their last rations and stop to rest the night before heading for another dome. In the middle of the night Pickard begins shouting and firing his gun, then becomes catatonic with his mouth open to the sky, starting to drown. Simmons recognizes this as a terminal stage of rain fatigue and shoots him. By morning Simmons can no longer hear anything but the rain and, realizing that he will soon go insane, tells the lieutenant to leave him to commit suicide.

The lieutenant continues alone, steadily growing more desperate, until he sees a Sun Dome. He stumbles toward it, nagged by urges to begin drinking the rain, and opens the door to a scene of luxury: freshly prepared sandwiches and hot chocolate, a change of uniform, and a phonograph in mid-song. He blinks for a moment and then sees only the sun, warming him in silence.

== Publishing history ==
The story was originally published in 1950 as "Death-by-Rain" in the magazine Planet Stories. It was one of the first group of stories selected to be part of the collection The Illustrated Man. It was later re-published in 1962 in R is for Rocket, again in 1980 in The Stories of Ray Bradbury, and in the 1990 omnibus The Golden Apples of the Sun. It was also included in Bradbury Stories: 100 of His Most Celebrated Tales (2005).

== Reception ==
Rob Fletcher uses the opening paragraph, in which Bradbury describes the rain of Venus with phrases like:

It was a hard rain, a perpetual rain, a sweating and steaming rain; it was a mizzle, a downpour, a fountain, a whipping in the eyes, an undertow at the ankles; it was a rain to drown all rains and the memory of rains

to illustrate the fact that Bradbury turns the rain into an "ominous force" that "threatens [the character's] very survival".

"The Long Rain", as a story, is a "typical Bradbury space yarn". His presentation of Venus as being rain-soaked has been proven wrong by more modern science, but was in line with the scientific views of the time. The story was one in a large number of stories by many science fiction writers of the time that presented an "orthodoxy" that although it would be much more difficult than Mars, humans would fight to colonize Venus. While his description of Venus is not scientifically accurate, "Bradbury's power of description makes it real enough".

== Adaptations ==
In 1969, Jack Smight directed a film adaptation of The Illustrated Man in which "The Long Rain" was one of three Bradbury stories placed within the framing story. The film, starring Rod Steiger who was an acquaintance of Bradbury, was both a critical and financial failure.

In 1992, the story was adapted for television, appearing as an episode in the series The Ray Bradbury Theater and starring Marc Singer, with Bradbury providing the introduction. As the original setting of Venus was no longer credible, the story was instead set on a planet in another solar system.
