= The Meadow (play) =

1947 radio drama by Ray Bradbury

- Original language: English
- Written by: Ray Bradbury

Premiere
- Date: 1960

The Meadow is a radio drama by Ray Bradbury, written for a 1947 episode of the radio series World Security Workshop. It was included in the anthology Best One-Act Plays of 1947-1948. Bradbury later revised it into a short story (1953) and a stage play (1960).

== Plot ==
The elderly security guard named Mr. Smith works at a movie studio. He fights to stop the producer, Mr. Douglass, from destroying the set. After Smith and Douglass have a conversation, Douglass is convinced to keep the set which are models of the cities of the world.
