= The Small Assassin =

The Small Assassin may refer to:

- The Small Assassin (book), a 1962 short story collection by Ray Bradbury
- The Small Assassin (short story), a 1946 short story by Ray Bradbury
