= List of X Minus One episodes =

List of episodes for the X Minus One radio show.

== 1955 ==
Title	Air Date	Author
1. "And The Moon Be Still As Bright"	April 22	Ray Bradbury (adapted by Ernest Kinoy)
2. "No Contact"	April 24	George Lefferts (story by George Lefferts & Ernest Kinoy)
3. "The Parade"	May 1	George Lefferts
4. "Mars is Heaven"	May 8	Ray Bradbury (adapted by Ernest Kinoy)
5. "Universe"	May 15	Robert A. Heinlein (adapted by George Lefferts)
6. "Knock"	May 22	Fredric Brown (adapted by Ernest Kinoy)
7. "The Man in the Moon"	May 29	George Lefferts
8. "Perigi's Wonderful Dolls"	June 5	George Lefferts
9. "The Green Hills of Earth"	July 7	Robert A. Heinlein (adapted by Ernest Kinoy)
10. "Dr. Grimshaw's Sanitorium"	July 14	Fletcher Pratt (adapted by George Lefferts)
11. "Nightmare"	July 21	Stephen Vincent Benét (adapted by George Lefferts; based on the poem "The Revolt of the Machines")
12. "The Embassy"	July 28	Donald A. Wollheim (adapted by George Lefferts)
13. "The Veldt"	August 4	Ray Bradbury (adapted by Ernest Kinoy)
14. "Almost Human"	August 11	Robert Bloch (adapted by George Lefferts)
15. "Courtesy"	August 18	Clifford D. Simak (adapted by George Lefferts)
16. "Cold Equations"	August 25	Tom Godwin (adapted by George Lefferts)
17. "Shanghaied"	September 1	Ernest Kinoy
18. "The Martian Death March"	September 8	Ernest Kinoy
19. "The Castaways"	September 15	Ernest Kinoy
20. "And The Moon Be Still As Bright" (Repeat)	September 22	Ray Bradbury (adapted by Ernest Kinoy)
21. "First Contact"	October 6	Murray Leinster (adapted by Howard Rodman)
22. "Child's Play"	October 20	William Tenn (adapted by George Lefferts)
23. "Requiem"	October 27	Robert A. Heinlein (adapted by Ernest Kinoy)
24. "Hello, Tomorrow"	November 3	George Lefferts
25. "Dwellers in Silence"	November 10	Ray Bradbury (adapted by George Lefferts)
26. "The Outer Limit"	November 16	Graham Doar (adapted by Ernest Kinoy)
27. "Zero Hour"	November 23	Ray Bradbury (adapted by George Lefferts)
28. "The Vital Factor"	November 30	Nelson Bond (adapted by Howard Rodman)
29. "Nightfall"	December 7	Isaac Asimov (adapted by Ernest Kinoy)
30. "To the Future"	December 14	Ray Bradbury (adapted by Ernest Kinoy from "The Fox and the Forest")
31. "Marionettes, Inc."	December 21	Ray Bradbury (adapted by George Lefferts)
32. "A Logic Named Joe"	December 28	Murray Leinster (adapted by Claris A. Ross)

== 1956 ==
Title	Air Date	Author
33. "The Roads Must Roll"	January 4	Robert A. Heinlein (adapted by Ernest Kinoy)
34. "Time and Time Again"	January 11	H. Beam Piper (adapted by Ernest Kinoy)
35. "Perigi's Wonderful Dolls" (Rebroadcast)	January 18	George Lefferts
36. "The Parade" (Rebroadcast)	January 25	George Lefferts
37. "The Cave of Night"	February 1	James E. Gunn (adapted by Ernest Kinoy)
38. "C-Chute"	February 8	Isaac Asimov (adapted by George Lefferts)
39. "Skulking Permit"	February 15	Robert Sheckley (adapted by Ernest Kinoy)
40. "Junkyard"	February 22	Clifford D. Simak (adapted by George Lefferts)
41. "Hello, Tomorrow" (Repeat)	February 29	George Lefferts
42. "A Gun for Dinosaur"	March 7	L. Sprague de Camp (adapted by Ernest Kinoy)
43. "Tunnel Under the World"	March 14	Frederik Pohl (adapted by George Lefferts)
44. "A Thousand Dollars a Plate"	March 21	Jack McKenty (adapted by Ernest Kinoy)
45. "A Pail of Air"	March 28	Fritz Leiber (adapted by George Lefferts)
46. "How-2"	April 3	Clifford D. Simak (adapted by William Welch)
47. "Star, Bright"	April 10	Mark Clifton (adapted by George Lefferts)
48. "Jaywalker"	April 17	Ross Rocklynne (adapted by George Leferts)
49. "The Sense of Wonder"	April 24	Milton Lesser (adapted by George Lefferts)
50. "Sea Legs"	May 1	Frank Quattrocchi (adapted by George Lefferts)
51. "The Seventh Order"	May 8	Jerry Sohl (adapted by George Lefferts)
52. "Hallucination Orbit"	May 15	J. T. McIntosh (adapted by Ernest Kinoy)
53. "The Defenders"	May 22	Philip K. Dick (adapted by George Lefferts)
54. "Lulungomeena"	May 29	Gordon R. Dickson (adapted by George Lefferts)
55. "Project Mastodon"	June 5	Clifford D. Simak (adapted by Ernest Kinoy)
56. "If You Was a Moklin"	June 12	Murray Leinster (adapted by Ernest Kinoy)
57. "Project Trojan"	June 19	Ernest Kinoy
58. "Wherever You May Be"	June 26	James E. Gunn (adapted by Ernest Kinoy)
59. "Mr. Costello, Hero"	July 3	Theodore Sturgeon (adapted by George Lefferts)
60. "Bad Medicine"	July 10	Finn O'Donnevan (adapted by George Lefferts)
61. "The Old Die Rich"	July 17	H. L. Gold (adapted by Ernest Kinoy)
62. "The Stars Are the Styx"	July 24	Theodore Sturgeon (adapted by Ernest Kinoy)
63. "Student Body"	July 31	F. L. Wallace (adapted by Ernest Kinoy)
64. "The Last Martian"	August 7	Fredric Brown (adapted by George Lefferts)
65. "The Snowball Effect"	August 14	Katherine MacLean (adapted by Ernest Kinoy)
66. "Surface Tension"	August 28	James Blish (adapted by George Lefferts)
67. "Tunnel Under the World" (Rebroadcast)	September 4	Frederik Pohl (adapted by George Lefferts)
68. "The Lifeboat Mutiny"	September 11	Robert Sheckley (adapted by Ernest Kinoy)
69. "The Map Makers"	September 26	Frederik Pohl (adapted by Ernest Kinoy)
70. "Protective Mimicry"	October 3	Algis Budrys (adapted by Ernest Kinoy)
71. "Colony"	October 10	Philip K. Dick (adapted by Ernest Kinoy)
72. "Soldier Boy"	October 17	Michael Shaara (adapted by Ernest Kinoy)
73. "Pictures Don't Lie"	October 24	Katherine MacLean (adapted by Ernest Kinoy)
74. "Sam, this Is You"	October 31	Murray Leinster (adapted by Ernest Kinoy)
75. "Appointment in Tomorrow"	November 7	Fritz Leiber (adapted by Ernest Kinoy)
76. "The Martian Death March" (Repeat)	November 14	Ernest Kinoy
77. "Chain of Command"	November 21	Steven Arr (adapted by George Lefferts)
78. "The Castaways" (Repeat)	November 28	Ernest Kinoy
79. "There Will Come Soft Rains" & "Zero Hour" (Rebroadcast)	December 5	Ray Bradbury (adapted by George Lefferts)
80. "Hostess"	December 12	Isaac Asimov (adapted by Ernest Kinoy)
81. "The Reluctant Heroes"	December 19	Frank M. Robinson (adapted by Ernest Kinoy)
82. "Honeymoon in Hell"	December 26	Fredric Brown (adapted by George Leferts)

== 1957 ==
Title	Air Date	Author
83. "The Moon Is Green"	January 2	Fritz Leiber (adapted by George Lefferts)
84. "A Saucer of Loneliness"	January 9	Theodore Sturgeon (adapted by George Lefferts)
85. "The Girls from Earth"	January 16	Frank M. Robinson (adapted by George Lefferts)
86. "Open Warfare"	January 23	James E. Gunn (adapted by Ernest Kinoy)
87. "Caretaker"	January 30	James H. Schmitz (adapted by Ernest Kinoy)
88. "Venus Is a Man's World"	February 6	William Tenn (adapted by Arthur Small)
89. "The Trap"	February 13	Finn O'Donnevan (adapted by Ernest Kinoy)
90. "Field Study"	February 20	Peter Phillips (adapted by Jack C. Wilson)
91. "Real Gone"	February 27	Ernest Kinoy (based on an idea by Al "Jazzbo" Collins)
92. "The Seventh Victim"	March 6	Robert Sheckley (adapted by Ernest Kinoy)
93. "The Lights on Precipice Peak"	March 13	Stephen Tall (adapted by Ernest Kinoy)
94. "Protection"	March 20	Robert Sheckley (adapted by Ernest Kinoy)
95. "At the Post"	March 27	H. L. Gold (adapted by Ernest Kinoy)
96. "Martian Sam"	April 3	Ernest Kinoy
97. "Something for Nothing"	April 10	Robert Sheckley (adapted by Ernest Kinoy)
98. "The Discovery of Morniel Mathaway"	April 17	William Tenn (adapted by Ernest Kinoy)
99. "Man's Best Friend"	April 24	Evelyn Smith (adapted by Ernest Kinoy)
100. "Inside Story"	June 20	Richard Wilson (adapted by Ernest Kinoy)
101. "The Category Inventor"	June 27	Arthur Sellings (adapted by Ernest Kinoy)
102. "Skulking Permit" (Rebroadcast)	July 4	Robert Sheckley (adapted by Ernest Kinoy)
103. "Early Model"	July 11	Robert Sheckley (adapted by Ernest Kinoy)
104. "The Merchant of Venus"	July 18	A. H. Phelps Jr. (adapted by Ernest Kinoy)
105. "The Haunted Corpse"	July 25	Frederik Pohl (adapted by William Welch)
106. "End as a World"	August 1	F. L. Wallace (adapted by Ernest Kinoy)
107. "The Scapegoat"	August 8	Richard Maples (adapted by Ernest Kinoy)
108. "At the Post" (Repeat)	August 15	H. L. Gold (adapted by Ernest Kinoy)
109. "Drop Dead"	August 22	Clifford D. Simak (adapted by Ernest Kinoy)
110. "Volpla"	August 29	Wyman Guin (adapted by Ernest Kinoy)
111. "Saucer of Loneliness" (Repeat)	September 5	Theodore Sturgeon (adapted by George Lefferts)
112. "The Old Die Rich" (Rebroadcast)	September 12	H. L. Gold (adapted by Ernest Kinoy)
113. "Tsylana"	September 19	James E. Gunn (adapted by George Lefferts)
114. "The Native Problem"	September 26	Robert Sheckley (adapted by William Welch)
115. "A Wind Is Rising"	October 3	Finn O'Donnevan (adapted by George Lefferts)
116. "Death Wish"	October 10	Ned Lang (adapted by William Welch)
117. "Point of Departure"	October 17	Vaughn Shelton (adapted by Ernest Kinoy)
118. "The Light"	October 24	Poul Anderson (adapted by William Welch)
119. "Lulu"	October 31	Clifford D. Simak (adapted by George Lefferts)
120. "The Coffin Cure"	November 21	Alan E. Nourse (adapted by Ernest Kinoy)
121. "Shocktroop"	November 28	Daniel F. Galouye (adapted by George Lefferts)
122. "The Haunted Corpse" (Rebroadcast)	December 12	Frederik Pohl (adapted by William Welch)
123. "Double Dare"	December 19	Robert Silverberg (adapted by William Welch)
124. "Target One"	December 26	Frederik Pohl (adapted by George Lefferts)

== 1958 ==
Title	Air Date	Author
125. "Prime Difference"	January 2	Alan E. Nourse (adapted by George Lefferts)
126. "Gray Flannel Armor"	January 9	Finn O'Donnevan (adapted by William Welch)

== 1973 ==
Title	Air Date	Author
127. "The Iron Chancellor"	January 27	Robert Silverberg

== See also ==
- List of Dimension X episodes
