= Felix Nelson =

American actor

- Born: Felix Bradford Nelson; August 13, 1913; Franklin, Texas, U.S.
- Died: February 17, 1998 (aged 70); Riverside, California, U.S.
- Other names: Felix B. Nelson, Felix P. Nelson
- Occupations: Actor, dancer
- Years active: 1937–1986

Felix Bradford Nelson (August 13, 1913 – February 17, 1998) was an American stage, film, radio and television actor, best known for his work in Gordon Parks' The Learning Tree and Ruth Woodman's "Land of the Free" (Death Valley Days' acclaimed Season 1 finale). Nelson also appeared as Jim from Huckleberry Finn on both radio and television, and, alongside Sammy Davis Jr. and a mostly African American cast, in Aaron Spelling's groundbreaking 10th Cavalry Regiment-themed TV western, Mission.

== Early life and career ==
A native of Franklin, Texas, the older of two sons born to John Nelson and Dove Biggers, Nelson ran away from home at the age of 13, joining the J. R. Roberton Circus as a dancer, performing the Charleston and Black Bottom. From 1937 through 1940 and again from 1945 through 1948, he appeared with the Laguna Beach Festival of the Arts, portraying painter Elihu Vedder's "African Sentinel." In the interim, he served with the United States Army for 3½ years during World War II, in China, India, and Burma, and was awarded the Purple Heart in 1945.

In 1949, Nelson became the first African American graduate of CBS's radio drama school. The following year, he appeared as Jim—alongside Dean Stockwell's Huck and Jerry Farber's Tom—on NBC University Theater, in Ernest Kinoy's adaptation of The Adventures of Huckleberry Finn. He also appeared that year on TV in Your Show Time's adaptation of Bret Harte's short story, "Colonel Starbottle for the Plaintiff," and onstage in a revival of the Broadway musical Carmen Jones, staged at the Greek Theatre in Los Angeles.

== Personal life and death ==
On June 3, 1948, the California Eagle reported that Nelson was residing in Laurel Canyon with his "pretty blue eyed wife." However, a 1953 profile in the Los Angeles Sentinel refers to him as "a bachelor."

On February 17, 1998, Nelson died of undisclosed causes. His remains are interred at Riverside National Cemetery.

== Works ==
=== Radio ===
Approximate date(s)	Program (or LP)	Role	Notes
April 17, 1949	NBC University Theater; Ep. "Huckleberry Finn"	Jim	Ernest Kinoy's one-hour adaptation of Twain's novel, starring Dean Stockwell and Jerry Farber, as Finn and Tom Sawyer, respectively.
January 22, 1950	NBC University Theater; Ep. "At Heaven's Gate"	An old man	Clarice A. Ross's adaptation of Robert Penn Warren's like-named novel, featuring Vivi Janiss as Sue and Stephen Chase as Gov. Milam.
July 23, 1950	NBC University Theater; Ep. "Huckleberry Finn"	Jim	Reprising 4/17/49 production, with Henry Blair taking over as Huck Finn.
August 20, 1950	NBC University Theater; Ep. A High Wind in Jamaica	The cook	Jane Speed's adaptation of Richard Hughes' novel
April 25, 1951	NBC Short Story; Ep. "I'm a Fool" and "I Want to Know Why"	NA	William Hodapp's adaptation of stories by Sherwood Anderson.
July 13, 1951	NBC Short Story; Ep. "They Are All Afraid"	NA	Canadian dramatist Len Peterson's award-winning 1943 radio play.
December 28, 1951	NBC Short Story; Ep. "The Trader's Wife"	NA	Adaptation of Jean Kenyon Mackenzie's novel.
May 2, 1952	NBC Short Story ep. "Biscuit Eater"	NA	Earl Hamner's adaptation of James Street's novel.

=== Film and television ===
Year	Title	Role	Notes
1937	Flying Down to Rio	Dancer (uncredited)	
1949	Your Show Time (TV) ep. "Colonel Starbottle for the Plaintiff"	NA	
1953	Jamaica Run	NA	
1953	Death Valley Days (TV); Ep. "Land of the Free"	Zack	
1953	Sangaree	Billy	
1953	A Lion Is in the Streets	Black cotton grower who corroborates Hank's suspicions just prior to pivotal short-weighting/shooting scene	
1953	Ramar of the Jungle (TV); Ep. "Idol Voodoo"	Chief Umpala	
1954	Playhouse of Stars; Ep. "The Jungle Trap"	George	Frank Burt script, dir. Jus Addiss
1954	Ramar of the Jungle (TV); Ep. "Striped Fury"	Chief Gonowa	
1955	Cavalcade of America (TV); Ep. A Chain of Hearts	Chef	
1956	Screen Directors Playhouse (TV); Ep. "The Dream"	Negro	
1956	General Electric Theater (TV); Ep. "The Jungle Trap"	George	
1956	Soldiers of Fortune (TV); Ep. "Boomerang"	Chief	
1959	General Electric Theater (TV); Ep. "Caesar and Cleopatra"	NA	
1959	Zane Grey Theater (TV); Ep. "Mission"	Trooper Potts	
1960	Shirley Temple's Storybook (TV); Ep. "Tom and Huck"	George	
1969	The Learning Tree	Jack Winger	
1969	The Bill Cosby Show (TV); Ep. "Let X Equal a Lousy Weekend"	Mr. Paskins	
1970	The Ballad of Cable Hogue	William	
1980	The White Shadow (TV); Ep. "Links"	Lawrence	
1983	The Winds of War (TV); Ep. 4 ("Defiance")	FDR Valet	
1983	The Best of Times (TV pilot)	Wheeler	
1983	Hardcastle and McCormick (TV); Ep. "Once Again With Vigorish"	Judge William Robinson	
1984	Hill Street Blues (TV); Ep. "Nichols from Heaven"	Man	
1984	Rituals (TV)	Carl Washington	
1986	Blue City	Caretaker	
1986	Stewardess School	Judge	
1986	Soul Man	Mr. Walker	
