= The 10th Victim =

- Italian film poster
- La Decima vittima
- Directed by: Elio Petri
- Screenplay by: Tonino Guerra; Giorgio Salvioni; Ennio Flaiano; Elio Petri
- Based on: "Seventh Victim" by Robert Sheckley
- Produced by: Carlo Ponti
- Starring: Marcello Mastroianni; Ursula Andress; Elsa Martinelli; Salvo Randone; Massimo Serato; Milo Quesada; Luce Bonifassy; George Wang
- Cinematography: Gianni Di Venanzo
- Edited by: Ruggero Mastroianni
- Music by: Piero Piccioni
- Production companies: C.C. Champion; Les Films Concordia
- Distributed by: Interfilm
- Release dates: 3 December 1965 (Italy); 10 February 1967 (France)
- Running time: 92 minutes
- Countries: Italy; France
- Languages: Italian; English
- Budget: ₤632 million
- Box office: ₤620 million

The 10th Victim (Italian: La decima vittima) is a 1965 science fiction film directed and co-written by Elio Petri, starring Marcello Mastroianni, Ursula Andress, Elsa Martinelli, and Salvo Randone. An international co-production between Italy and France, it is based on Robert Sheckley's 1953 short story "Seventh Victim".

Taking place in the year 2079 in the aftermath of World War III, the film's focus is on a government-endorsed program known as "The Big Hunt", whereby contestants from around the world act as "hunters" and "victims" in two-person battles to the death as a means of avoiding mass warfare. The plot follows veteran Big Hunt contestants Caroline Meredith (Andress) and Marcello Poletti (Mastroianni), who are respectively assigned the roles of hunter and victim for one such confrontation, which is complicated by their budding romance. Like Petri's other films, The 10th Victim is a work of socio-political satire, while also combining science fiction themes with conventions of the commedia all'italiana genre.

Upon release, The 10th Victim performed below expectations in Italy and received mixed reviews from critics. In the decades since its initial release, the film has garnered a cult following, and its imagery has been referenced or parodied in other films, notably the Austin Powers franchise; it is also considered to be a forerunner to works depicting televised fights to the death, such as The Hunger Games. A novelization of the film, written by Sheckley, was published in 1966, this was followed by two sequels, Victim Prime and Hunter/Victim in 1987 and 1988, respectively. Although several attempts to produce a remake of The 10th Victim have been announced, none have entered production.

== Plot ==
In the 21st century, World War III has recently ended. In order to prevent a potential fourth war, those with violent tendencies are given an opportunity to engage in "The Big Hunt," the world's most popular form of entertainment. This event attracts participants seeking fame and fortune. The competition involves ten rounds, with each competitor experiencing five rounds as the hunter and five as the victim. The last person standing after ten rounds becomes immensely wealthy and can retire.

Caroline Meredith, as victim, has just claimed her ninth kill and is next on the hunt for the tenth. Eager to maximize her financial gains, Meredith aims for a flawless kill in front of the cameras, having secured a significant sponsorship from the Ming Tea Company. Marcello Poletti is selected as the victim; however, his winnings from six kills have already been spent by his mistress, Olga, and his ex-wife, Lidia.

To carry out her plan, Caroline travels to Rome and assumes the role of a reporter assigned to study the sexual preoccupations of Italian men. She requests an interview with Marcello at the Temple of Venus. Suspecting something amiss, Marcello plans for Caroline to be attacked by a crocodile in front of a rival television company's cameras, but she manages to escape. Caroline later entices Marcello to the beach, convincing him of her love. After drugging Marcello, she brings him back to the Temple of Venus.

In a dramatic twist, Caroline shoots Marcello on live television, only to discover that he loaded the gun with blanks. Marcello retaliates by shooting her, but her bulletproof armor saves her. Marcello and Caroline decide to break free from The Big Hunt and board a plane, ultimately choosing to get married. The movie concludes with the pilot showering them with a cascade of flowers.

== Differences from the original story ==
The original short story was written from the point of view of a man hunting his seventh target, a woman, whereas in the movie she is the hunter. He finds her apparently defenceless sitting in a café. Talking to her, she tells him how she is new to the game but could not bear to kill her own target, and now expects to die. The hunter falls in love with his victim, as in the movie, and eventually reveals who he is. She has tricked him; she shoots him, joining the ranks of the "Tens".

The story was adapted for radio on X Minus One in 1957.

== Cast ==
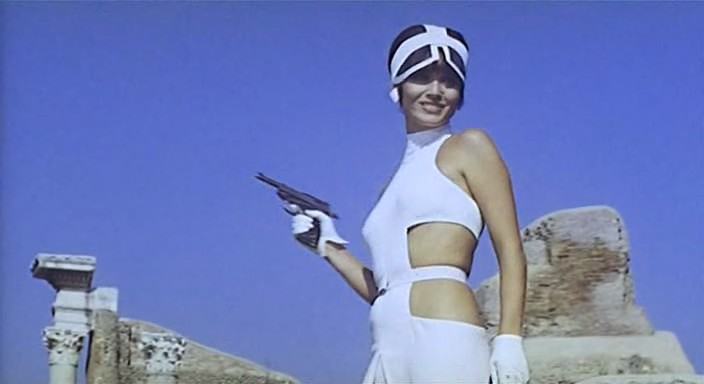
Elsa Martinelli as Olga.

- Marcello Mastroianni as Marcello Polletti
- Ursula Andress as Caroline Meredith
- Elsa Martinelli as Olga
- Salvo Randone as Professor
- Massimo Serato as Lawyer Rossi
- Milo Quesada as Rudi
- Luce Bonifassy as Lidia Poletti
- George Wang as Chinese Hunter
- Evi Rigano as Victim
- Walter Williams as Martin
- Richard Armstrong as Cole
- Anita Sanders as Relaxatorium Hostess
- Mickey Knox as Chet
- Jacques Herlin as Masoch Club Owner
- Wolfgang Hillinger as Baron Von Aschenberg

== Production ==
An avid reader of science fiction, Petri began work on an adaptation of Sheckley's story in 1961; producer Carlo Ponti came onboard the project due to the involvement of Mastroianni. A variety of screenwriters worked on the script to varying degrees without receiving an onscreen credit, including Suso Cecchi D'Amico, Nate Monaster and Ernesto Gastaldi. Ponti's lack of interest in the science fiction genre led to his mandating of more comedic elements in the story against Petri's wishes, including altering its original, pessimistic ending. Backed by financial support from Joseph E. Levine's Embassy Pictures, filming took place primarily on location in Rome and New York City from June to September 1964; produced at the height of the pop art movement in Italy, Petri sought to create a vision of the future that juxtaposes that style's imagery with Rome's ancient and modern architectural structures, such as the Colosseum and the EUR district.

== Release ==
The 10th Victim was released in Italy on 3 December 1965. The film grossed a little over 620 million lire in Italy upon its theatrical release. It was released in France on February 10, 1967.

The 10th Victim was distributed abroad, including in the United States and Canada by Embassy Pictures in late December 1965.

== Reception ==
On review aggregator Rotten Tomatoes, the film holds a score of 80% based on 10 reviews, with an average rating of 7.35/10. In contemporary reviews, the Monthly Film Bulletin praised the visuals of the film, but stated that "the film is never quite as much fun as it should be, possibly because of rather ponderous dubbing and possibly because imaginative camera angles cannot totally make up for lapses in narrative." Bosley Crowther of The New York Times noted a "wildly imaginative plot" but declared the film overall to be "a clever but patently self-conscious exercise ... The cleverness is so insistent that it soon becomes excessive and absurd, and the gamesmanship of the satire becomes too cute, too much a bore." Variety found the film superior to Jean-Luc Godard's Alphaville, praising both Mastroianni and Andress, as well as Elsa Martinelli and Massimo Serato. The review also noted the cinematography of Gianni di Venanzo. Richard L. Coe of The Washington Post wrote that the film is "not handled so crisply as the material promises", finding that director Elio Petri "did not find quite the exact, cohesive tone such material demands. The result is curiously pedestrian." Algis Budrys of Galaxy Science Fiction described Sheckley's novelization as "a reasonably good chase novel" which would, nonetheless, disappoint readers, whether they wanted a literary version of the film's Italian satire and symbolism or the 'chilling futurama of legalized manslaughter' the cover promised.

== Legacy ==
Nick Chen of the British Film Institute described The 10th Victim as a cult film. The film would influence later films such as Austin Powers: The Spy Who Shagged Me (1999). In the audio commentary for the film, director Jay Roach mentions that a sequence was "inspired by The Tenth Victim", to which actor Mike Myers interjects that it was "stolen from".

It was also the first film to feature the reality TV death game theme, which was later used in other works such as Battle Royale, Series 7: The Contenders, and The Hunger Games.

== See also ==
- Assassin (game)
- Battle Royale
- Death Race
- The Hunger Games
- The Most Dangerous Game
- The Purge
- The Running Man (film)
- Series 7: The Contenders
- The Tournament (film)
