= Almost Human =

Almost Human may refer to:

== Film ==
- Almost Human (1927 film), an American silent film directed by Frank Urson
- Almost Human (1974 film), an Italian crime film directed by Umberto Lenzi
- Almost Human (1977 film) or Shock Waves, an American horror film directed by Ken Wiederhorn
- Almost Human (2013 film), an American sci-fi horror film directed by Joe Begos
- Almost Human Inc., a special-effects company owned by Robert Green Hall

== Literature ==
- Almost Human: Making Robots Think, a 2007 book by Lee Gutkind
- "Almost Human", a short story by Ruth Rendell from her 1976 collection The Fallen Curtain
- "Almost Human", a short story by Robert Bloch, twice adapted for radio:
  - "Almost Human", a 1950 episode of the radio show Dimension X
  - "Almost Human", a 1955 episode of the radio show X Minus One

== Music ==
- Almost Human (Maya Beiser album), 2006
- Almost Human (Voltaire album), 2000
- Almost Human, a 2001 album by Cripple Bastards
- "Almost Human", a song by Deep Purple from Abandon
- "Almost Human", a song by Kiss from Love Gun
- "Almost Human", a song by Lauren Daigle from the film soundtrack Blade Runner 2049

== Other media ==
- Almost Human (TV series), a 2013 American science fiction series
- Almost Human, a Finnish video game company known for Legend of Grimrock
