= List of Dimension X episodes =

Dimension X was an NBC radio program broadcast on an unsponsored, sustaining basis from April 8, 1950, to September 29, 1951. The first 13 episodes were broadcast live, and the remainder were pre-recorded. Fred Wiehe and Edward King were the directors. Norman Rose was heard as both announcer and narrator.

Episode No	Title	Author	Release date
1	"The Outer Limit"	Graham Doar (adapted by Ernest Kinoy)	April 8, 1950
2	"With Folded Hands"	Jack Williamson (adapted by John Dunkel)	April 15, 1950
3	"Report on the Barnhouse Effect"	Kurt Vonnegut (adapted by Claris A. Ross)	April 22, 1950
4	"No Contact"	George Lefferts (story by George Lefferts & Ernest Kinoy)	April 29, 1950
5	"Knock"	Fredric Brown (adapted by Ernest Kinoy)	May 6, 1950
6	"Almost Human"	Robert Bloch (adapted by George Lefferts)	May 13, 1950
7	"The Lost Race"	Murray Leinster (adapted by Ernest Kinoy from the story "The Lost")	May 20, 1950
8	"To the Future"	Ray Bradbury (adapted by Ernest Kinoy from the story "The Fox and the Forest")	May 27, 1950
9	"The Embassy"	Donald A. Wollheim (adapted by George Lefferts)	June 3, 1950
10	"The Green Hills of Earth"	Robert A. Heinlein (adapted by Ernest Kinoy)	June 10, 1950
11	"There Will Come Soft Rains / Zero Hour"	Ray Bradbury (adapted by George Lefferts)	June 17, 1950
12	"Destination Moon"	Robert A. Heinlein (adapted directly from the George Pal film)	June 24, 1950
13	"A Logic Named Joe"	Murray Leinster (adapted by Claris A. Ross)	July 1, 1950
14	"Mars Is Heaven!"	Ray Bradbury (adapted by Ernest Kinoy)	July 7, 1950
15	"The Man in the Moon"	George Lefferts	July 14, 1950
16	"Beyond Infinity"	Villiers Gerson	July 21, 1950
17	"The Potters of Firsk"	Jack Vance (adapted by Ernest Kinoy)	July 28, 1950
18	"Perigi's Wonderful Dolls"	George Lefferts	August 4, 1950
19	"The Castaways"	Ernest Kinoy (story by Ernest Kinoy & George Lefferts)	August 11, 1950
20	"The Martian Chronicles"	Ray Bradbury (adapted by Ernest Kinoy)	August 18, 1950
21	"The Parade"	George Lefferts	August 25, 1950
22	"The Roads Must Roll"	Robert A. Heinlein (adapted by Ernest Kinoy)	September 1, 1950
23	"The Outer Limit"	Graham Doar (adapted by Ernest Kinoy)	September 8, 1950
24	"Hello Tomorrow"	George Lefferts	September 15, 1950
25	"Dr. Grimshaw's Sanitorium"	Fletcher Pratt (adapted by George Lefferts)	September 22, 1950
26	"And the Moon be Still as Bright"	Ray Bradbury (adapted by Ernest Kinoy)	September 29, 1950
27	"No Contact"	George Lefferts (story by George Lefferts & Ernest Kinoy; rebroadcast of April 29, 1950, program)	October 28, 1950
28	"The Professor Was a Thief"	L. Ron Hubbard (adapted by George Lefferts)	November 5, 1950
29	"Shanghaied"	Ernest Kinoy	November 12, 1950
30	"Competition"	E. Mayne Hull (adapted by Ernest Kinoy)	November 19, 1950
31	"Universe"	Robert A. Heinlein (adapted by George Lefferts)	November 26, 1950
32	"The Green Hills of Earth"	Robert A. Heinlein (adapted by George Lefferts; rebroadcast of June 10, 1950, program)	December 24, 1950
33	"Mars Is Heaven!"	Ray Bradbury (adapted by Ernest Kinoy; rebroadcast of July 7, 1950, program)	January 7, 1951
34	"The Martian Death March"	Ernest Kinoy	January 14, 1951
35	"The Last Objective"	Paul Carter (adapted by Ernest Kinoy)	June 3, 1951
36	"Nightmare"	Stephen Vincent Benét (based on the poem "The Revolt of the Machines"; adapted by George Lefferts)	June 10, 1951
37	"Pebble in the Sky"	Isaac Asimov (adapted by Ernest Kinoy)	June 17, 1951
38	"Child's Play"	William Tenn (adapted by George Lefferts)	June 21, 1951
39	"Time and Time Again"	H. Beam Piper (adapted by Ernest Kinoy)	July 12, 1951
40	"Dwellers in Silence"	Ray Bradbury (adapted by George Lefferts)	July 19, 1951
41	"Courtesy"	Clifford D. Simak (adapted by George Lefferts)	July 26, 1951
42	"Universe"	Robert A. Heinlein (adapted by George Lefferts; rebroadcast of November 26, 1950, program)	August 2, 1951
43	"The Veldt"	Ray Bradbury (adapted by Ernest Kinoy)	August 9, 1951
44	"The Vital Factor"	Nelson Bond (adapted by Howard Rodman)	August 16, 1951
45	"Untitled Story"	Frank M. Robinson (adapted by George Lefferts)	August 23, 1951
46	"Marionettes, Inc."	Ray Bradbury (adapted by George Lefferts)	August 30, 1951
47	"First Contact"	Murray Leinster (adapted by Howard Rodman)	September 8, 1951
48	"Kaleidoscope"	Ray Bradbury (adapted by George Lefferts)	September 15, 1951
49	"Requiem"	Robert A. Heinlein (adapted by Ernest Kinoy)	September 22, 1951
50	"Nightfall"	Isaac Asimov (adapted by Ernest Kinoy)	September 29, 1951

== See also ==
- List of X Minus One episodes
