= Rocky Fortune =

American radio drama

- Genre: Radio drama
- Running time: 25 minutes
- Country of origin: United States
- Language: English
- Home station: NBC Radio Network
- TV adaptations: none
- Hosted by: NBC
- Starring: Frank Sinatra
- Created by: George Lefferts
- Written by: George Lefferts, Ernest Kinoy, Norm Sickel, Robert Senadella, Doc Sanford
- Directed by: Andrew C. Love, Fred Weihe, Howard Wiley
- Narrated by: Edward King
- Original release: October 6, 1953 – March 30, 1954
- No. of episodes: 25
- Opening theme: I Remember Harlem (Roy Eldridge)
- Ending theme: I Remember Harlem (Roy Eldridge)

Rocky Fortune is an American radio drama that aired weekly on NBC Radio beginning in October 1953. The series ended its run in March 1954 after 25 episodes. The program was created by George Lefferts. Frank Sinatra voiced the title role of Rocky Fortune for the entire series.

Rocky Fortune aired Tuesday nights on NBC at 9:35 pm Eastern, immediately following Dragnet (and a five-minute John Cameron Swayze newscast). It was a sustaining series, meaning that NBC presented the program without corporate sponsorship. The premiere episode, "Oyster Shucker", originally aired on October 6, 1953.

== Characters and story ==
Frank Sinatra portrayed Rocco Fortunato, also known as Rocky Fortune, a young man of several talents constantly in need of employment and who accepts odd jobs from the fictitious Gridley Employment Agency, often referred to simply as "the Agency." During the course of the series, he would work as a process server, museum tour guide, cabbie, bodyguard, chauffeur, truck driver, social director for a Catskills resort and a carny, in addition to various musical jobs. These assignments typically led Rocky into situations where he would track down criminals, often rescuing people (especially women) in need of help, and ultimately needing to find yet more work. Rocky made many wise remarks, using "hep" slang of the times, and seemed to attract trouble wherever he went.

Sinatra infused the role of Rocky with a witty, tongue-in-cheek quality that acknowledged Sinatra's own career. For example, in the episode "Football Fix", Rocky begins to sing "I've Got the World on a String" while walking down the street, a song Sinatra had performed prior to playing the role of Rocky.

Aside from Sinatra, the only other recurring role on the series was that of Hamilton J. Finger, a solid and dependable (though not very intelligent) police sergeant played by Barney Phillips. Other guest roles on Rocky Fortune were filled by actors such as Raymond Burr, Ed Begley and Jack Kruschen.

Creator of the show George Lefferts was also one of the primary scriptwriters, along with Ernest Kinoy. The two had previously collaborated on other radio programs such as X Minus One and Dimension X: in the episode "Rocket Racket", Fortune's job is apparently to fly a prototype spaceship. An eccentric oil millionaire tells of his fascination with science fiction and space travel, to which Rocky knowingly acknowledges, "Dimension X." Lefferts and Kinoy would go on to become award-winning writers and producers in the years that followed.

Edward "Eddie" King was the show's narrator, who began each episode by stating, "NBC presents Frank Sinatra, starring as that footloose and fancy-free young gentleman, Rocky Fortune!" (though it was "footloose and frequently unemployed..." for the first two episodes).

The final episode, "Boarding House Doublecross", aired on March 30, 1954, less than a week after Sinatra won the Academy Award for Best Supporting Actor for his role as Private Angelo Maggio in the 1953 film, From Here to Eternity. As a running gag towards the end of the show's run, Sinatra would work the phrase "from here to eternity" into the script as a reference to his film role in almost every episode.

== Episodes ==
#	Date	Title
01	Oct 6, 1953	"Oyster Shucker" (a.k.a. "Pearl Smugglers")
02	Oct 13, 1953	"Steven in a Rest Home" (a.k.a. "Insurance Fraud"; "Steven Crandall"; "Double Indemnity")
03	Oct 20, 1953	"Ship's Steward" (a.k.a. "Shipboard Jewel Robbery")
04	Oct 27, 1953	"Pint-Sized Payroll Bandit" (a.k.a. "Short Order Cook")
05	Nov 10, 1953	"$100 an Hour Messenger" (a.k.a. "Messenger Boy"; "Messenger For Murder")
06	Nov 17, 1953	"A Little Jazz Goes a Long Way to Murder" (a.k.a. "A Hepcat Kills the Canary")
07	Nov 24, 1953	"Drama Critic's Bodyguard" (a.k.a. "Nursemaid to a Drama Critic"; "Murder on the Aisle")
08	Dec 1, 1953	"Art Store Handyman" (a.k.a. "Parlormaid to a Statue"; "Murder Among the Statues")
09	Deb 8, 1953	"The Kid and the Carnival" (a.k.a. "Carnival One Way")
10	Dec 15, 1953	"Paid Companion" (a.k.a. "Companion to a Chimp")
11	Dec 22, 1953	"Department Store Santa" (a.k.a. "The Plot to Murder Santa Claus")
12	Dec 29, 1953	"Prize Fighter" (a.k.a. "Prize Fighter Setup")
13	Jan 5, 1954	"On the Trail of a Killer" (a.k.a. "Love and Death"; "Sister Ellie's Dead")
14	Jan 12, 1954	"Ride 'em Cowboy" (a.k.a. "Rodeo Murder")
15	Jan 19, 1954	"Murder In the Museum (a.k.a. "The Museum Murder"; "Museum of Ancient History")
16	Jan 26, 1954	"Hollywood or Boom" (a.k.a. "Hauling Nitro")
17	Feb 2, 1954	"Football Fix"
18	Feb 9, 1954	"Social Director" (a.k.a. "Catskills Cover-Up")
19	Feb 16, 1954	"Too Many Husbands" (a.k.a. "The Too-Much-Married Blonde")
20	Feb 23, 1954	"Hit List" (a.k.a. "Decoy For Death"; "The Grinder")
21	Mar 2, 1954	"Drug Addict" (a.k.a. "The Doctor's Dilemma")
22	Mar 9, 1954	"Let's Find a Murderer" (a.k.a. "Incident in a Bar"; "Fresh Corpse")
23	Mar 16, 1954	"The Little Voice of Murder" (a.k.a. "Psychological Murder"; "Witness to a Kill"[or "Will"])
24	Mar 23, 1954	"Rocket to the Morgue" (a.k.a. "Rocket Racket"; "Zenith Foundation")
25	Mar 30, 1954	"Boarding House Doublecross"
