= The Discovery of Morniel Mathaway =

1955 science fiction story by William Tenn

- Short story by William Tenn
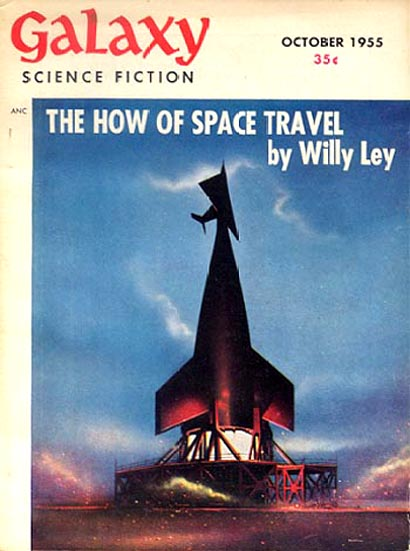
- Galaxy, October 1955
- Country: United States
- Language: English
- Genre(s): Science fiction short story

Publication
- Published in: Galaxy
- Publication type: Periodical
- Media type: Magazine, radio play, movie
- Publication date: 1955

"The Discovery of Morniel Mathaway" is a science fiction short story written by William Tenn (Philip Klass) and first published in Galaxy Science Fiction in October 1955.

An art historian travels into the past and is surprised to learn that the artist celebrated in his own time as a master is a talentless hack.

== Plot summary ==
Glescu, an art historian from the year 2487, wins a prestigious award that grants him one-time use of a time machine. He uses it to travel into the past to meet with the celebrated master artist Morniel Mathaway. Mathaway's friend, Dave Dantziger, is in the apartment when Glescu arrives. Dave is surprised to learn of Mathaway's future fame given his own opinion of him as "an unbathed and untalented Greenwich Village painter who began almost every sentence with 'I' and ended every third one with 'me'".

When Glescu asks to see one of Mathaway's recent paintings, Mathaway shows him one that is so bad that Glescu is shocked. Several more in the apartment are of similar quality. This prompts Glescu to show him a book, The Complete Paintings of Morniel Mathaway, 1928–1996, which contains paintings that are well beyond Mathaway's capabilities, beautiful beyond anything Dave had ever seen. Mathaway responds by saying a painting he has recently given to a neighbor is more like what Glescu expects.

While pretending to retrieve a key to the neighbor's apartment, Mathaway uses the time machine to move into the future where he is a celebrity. He takes the book to acquaint himself with "his" paintings. Glescu is dismayed at being trapped in the past, with no means of sustenance. Dave suggests he take Mathaway's name and Social Security number and begin painting for a living. Glescu, protesting his lack of artistic ability and saying he is only recreating images from memory, produces the celebrated artwork of the "real" Morniel Mathaway.

== Reception ==
The story was published in the October 1955 issue of Galaxy Science Fiction, an issue best known for its cover article by Willy Ley describing the Disneyland production of Man in Space which featured the famous reusable winged spaceship designed by Wernher von Braun for the show. The story was reprinted many times over the next decades, and was included in numerous collections and anthologies.

A radio play version of the work was adapted by Ernest Kinoy for X Minus One and first aired on April 17, 1957. The same script was used for productions on WMUK's Future Tense in July 1976.

The story has been adapted to movie form twice, once in Italy as La scoperta di Morniel Mathaway and again in a short form in English in 2007.

In his 1989 The Sublime Object of Ideology, Slavoj Žižek uses the story to illustrate Jacques Lacan's concept of the sinthome: Glescu becomes Mathaway without ever having intended to, or even realizing it consciously. This interpretation has itself become a widely used argument that has led to the story being discussed in a number of general philosophical works.
