= Breaking Point (1963 TV series) =

American medical drama television series (1963–1964)

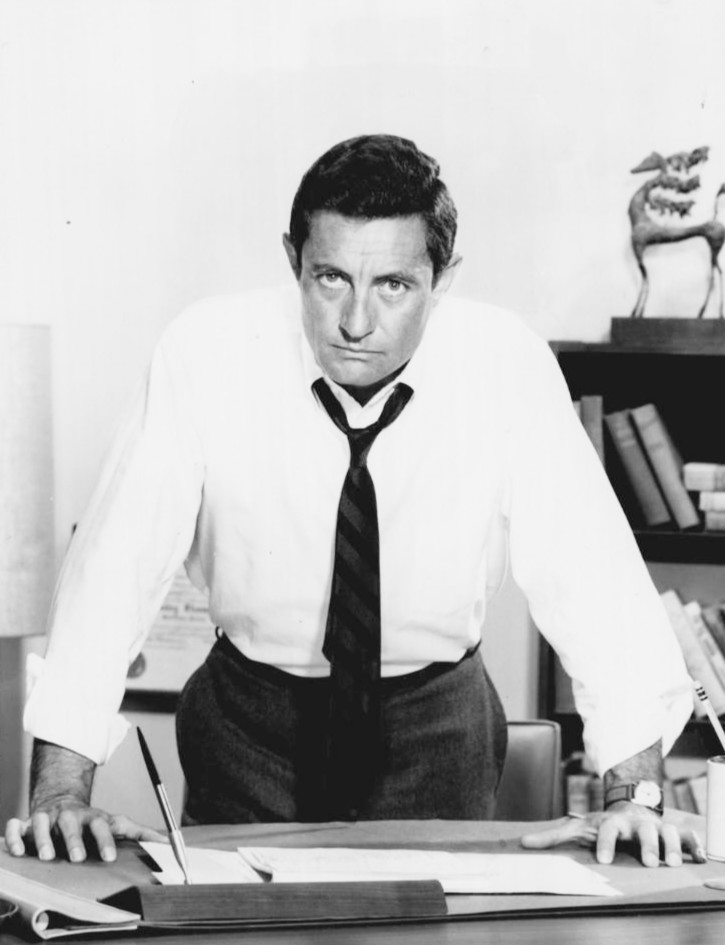
- Paul Richards as McKinley Thompson.
- Genre: Medical drama
- Created by: Meta Rosenberg
- Directed by: Robert Ellis Miller
- Starring: Paul Richards; Eduard Franz
- Theme music composer: David Raksin
- Composers: John Carisi; Walter Scharf; Richard Markowitz; John Williams; Morton Stevens; Jerry Goldsmith; George Duning; Gerald Fried; Van Alexander
- Country of origin: United States
- Original language: English
- No. of seasons: 1
- No. of episodes: 30

Production
- Executive producers: John E. Pommer; George Lefferts (1964)
- Producers: George Lefferts; Richard Collins; Morton Fine; David Friedkin
- Cinematography: Robert Hauser
- Camera setup: Single-camera
- Running time: 45–48 minutes
- Production company: Bing Crosby Productions (produced at the studios of Desilu)

Original release
- Network: ABC
- Release: September 16, 1963 – April 27, 1964

Related
- Ben Casey; The Eleventh Hour

Breaking Point is an American medical drama that aired on ABC from September 16, 1963, to April 27, 1964, with reruns continuing until September 7, 1964. The series, which was a spin-off of Ben Casey, starred Paul Richards and Eduard Franz. The series was created by Meta Rosenberg.

== Background ==
The NBC drama The Eleventh Hour was the inspiration for creation of Breaking Point, the characters of which were first seen on the September 9, 1963, episode of Ben Casey. Following that development, Ben Casey moved to Wednesday nights, and Breaking Point took its Monday night slot.

Producer George Lefferts was partially inspired to create Breaking Point on the back of the success of an earlier show that also dealt with mental health issues, Special for Women.

== Synopsis ==
Richards starred as Dr. McKinley Thompson (known as "Dr. Mac" to most of the staff), resident in psychiatry at York Hospital in Los Angeles. Franz co-starred as Dr. Edward Raymer, the hospital's psychiatric clinical director. Following the lead of the "semi-anthology" format developed by such then-current shows as Naked City or Route 66, the guest stars were often the focal characters of any given episode, as episodes focused more on problems of people who sought help at the clinic than on activities at the clinic itself.

== Guest stars ==
- Bettye Ackerman
- Martin Balsam
- Shelley Berman
- James Callahan
- Michael Callan
- John Cassavetes
- Dabney Coleman
- Rosemary DeCamp
- James Daly
- Bradford Dillman
- Dianne Foster
- Anthony Franciosa
- Clint Howard
- Lillian Gish
- Virginia Gregg
- James Gregory
- Susan Harrison
- Mariette Hartley
- Joey Heatherton
- Kim Hunter
- Russell Johnson
- Piper Laurie
- Carol Lawrence
- John Larkin
- Barry Livingston
- Robert Loggia
- Scott Marlowe
- Kevin McCarthy
- Ralph Meeker
- Burgess Meredith
- Alan Napier
- Kathleen Nolan
- Sheree North
- Edmond O'Brien
- Arthur O'Connell
- Jack Oakie
- Eleanor Parker
- Walter Pidgeon
- Robert Redford
- Hari Rhodes
- Mark Richman
- Cliff Robertson
- Ruth Roman
- Gena Rowlands
- Robert Ryan
- Telly Savalas
- Vito Scotti
- Jan Sterling
- Susan Strasberg
- Rip Torn
- Jack Warden

== Episodes ==
No.	Title	Directed by	Written by	Original release date
1	"Solo for B-Flat Clarinet"	Sydney Pollack	George Lefferts	September 16, 1963
A musician (Scott Marlowe) is disturbed by the conflict between his cruelly authoritarian father (Oscar Homolka) and himself. A continuation of a two-part story that began on the Ben Casey episode "For This Relief, Much Thanks" (September 9, 1963), it guest-starred Vincent Edwards as Ben Casey, Russell Johnson, Dabney Coleman, Millie Perkins, and Sheree North.
2	"Last Summer We Didn't Go Away"	William A. Graham	Meta Rosenberg & Jerome Ross	September 23, 1963
A psychiatric patient (Anthony Franciosa) tries to keep his treatment secret when he returns to teaching. It also guest-starred Ed Asner and Brenda Scott.
3	"Fire and Ice"	Unknown	Mann Rubin	September 30, 1963
An unhinged executive's wife (Janice Rule) seeks psychiatric help due to an avalanche of problems, including a disengaging husband and oppressive mother-in-law. It also guest-starred Kevin McCarthy and Irene Tedrow.
4	"Bird and Snake"	William A. Graham	James Yaffe	October 7, 1963
A disruptive group-therapy patient preys on the group to vent his hostility toward others. It also guest-starred Robert Redford, Jack Weston, and Marisa Pavan.
5	"There Are the Hip and There Are the Square"	Don Siegel	Mark Rodgers	October 14, 1963
A young couple (John Cassavetes and Carol Lawrence) express their rebellion through a suicide pact. It also guest-starred J. Pat O'Malley, Virginia Gregg, Woodrow Parfrey, and Gilbert Green.
6	"The Bull Roarer"	Ralph Senensky	Ernest Kinoy	October 21, 1963
A shy, young construction worker (Lou Antonio) is troubled by his inability to engage in "manly" activities, and fears he may be a homosexual. It also guest-starred Ralph Meeker, Mariette Hartley, Cece Whitney, and Carmen Phillips.
7	"Crack in an Image"	Unknown	Meta Rosenberg & Allan Sloane	October 28, 1963
A senatorial candidate's (Mark Richman) chances for higher office are threatened by the emotional breakdown of his wife (Kim Hunter). It also guest-starred Paul Stewart and Holly McIntire.
8	"A Pelican in the Wilderness"	Elliot Silverstein	Michael Blankfort	November 4, 1963
A rabbi (Martin Balsam) loses his faith following the accidental death of his only son. It also guest-starred Akim Tamiroff, Noam Pitlik, Barbara Turner, Virginia Capers, and Zolya Talma.
9	"And James Was a Very Small Snail"	Robert Ellis Miller	Allan Sloane	November 11, 1963
An autistic child (Eddie Rossen) is aided by a therapist (Martine Bartlett), who seeks the key to communicating with him. It also guest-starred Harold J. Stone, Marsha Hunt, Michael Fox, Marcia Dealy, and Donald Losby.
10	"Whatsoever Things I Hear"	William A. Graham	Albert Sanders	November 18, 1963
A frustrated salesman (Shelley Berman) is accused of attempted assault, and Dr. Thompson goes on trial for refusing to release his case history to the court. It also guest-starred Joe Maross, Malachi Throne, Sarah Marshall, Joanna Frank, Harry Bartell, Hari Rhodes, Suzy Carnell, and Doreen Lang.
11	"Who Is Mimi, What Is She?"	Paul Wendkos	Meta Rosenberg & Jay Dratler & Leonard Kanter	December 2, 1963
A fan-club founder attempts to live vicariously through a fading film star (Ruth Roman). It also guest-starred Terry Becker, Sondra Blake, Hunt Powers, and Sylvia Lewis.
12	"Millions of Faces"	William A. Graham	Alvin Boretz	December 9, 1963
A psychiatric ward attendant (Rip Torn), who is impersonating a doctor, seeks the help of Dr. Thompson after he makes an enemy of a veteran nurse (Jan Sterling).
13	"The Gnu, Now Almost Extinct"	William A. Graham	Milton Merlin & Barbara Merlin	December 16, 1963
An aging actress (Lillian Gish) refuses to accept the death of her witty, nonconformist husband (Walter Pidgeon). It also guest-starred Vito Scotti and Clint Howard.
14	"Heart of Marble, Body of Stone"	Ida Lupino	Steven Gethers	December 23, 1963
A narcissistic model (Gena Rowlands) sees her marriage collapse due to her possessive father (Burgess Meredith), who tries to manage both her career and life. It also guest-starred John Milford, Mary Gregory, Gloria Calomee, and Russ Bender.
15	"Don't Cry, Baby, Don't Cry"	Leo Penn	George Lefferts	December 30, 1963
A prison inmate (Sheree North) participates as a substitute mother to a difficult child in one of Dr. Thompson's rehabilitation experiments. It also guest-starred Robert Ellenstein, Cece Whitney, Doris Dowling, and Maidie Norman.
16	"A Little Anger Is a Good Thing"	Arnold Laven	Raphael Hayes	January 6, 1964
A retired barber (Arthur O'Connell) needs a reason to live, and a warm-hearted widow (Rosemary De Camp) gives him such a reason. It also guest-starred Amanda Ames, Dean Harens, Helen Kleeb, Richard Bull, and Ralph Manza.
17	"And If Thy Hand Offend Thee"	Paul Stanley	Story by : George Bellak; Teleplay by : Morton Fine	January 13, 1964
A World War II veteran (James Daly) involved in the bombing of Hiroshima, who married a Japanese woman from the city, is plagued by guilt over his past actions. It also guest-starred Irene Tsu, Nobu McCarthy, Richard Webb, and Yasuko.
18	"Better Than a Dead Lion"	William A. Graham	Story by : Shimon Bar-David; Teleplay by : Shimon Bar-David and Morton Fine	January 20, 1964
An author (Robert Ryan) with writer's block develops an imaginary physical paralysis, causing his wife (Bettye Ackerman) to fear he will attempt suicide. It also guest-starred John Larkin.
19	"A Land More Cruel"	Unknown	George Bellak	January 27, 1964
A fashion designer (Eleanor Parker) compulsively seeks out liaisons with strange men, then sets her sights on seducing Dr. Thompson. It also guest-starred Robert Brubaker and Barry Livingston.
20	"No Squares in My Family Circle"	Robert Stevens	Harold Gast & Milton Merlin	February 10, 1964
An Italian baker (Jack Warden) suffers guilt from his early days as an immigrant affiliated with gangsters. It also guest-starred Johnny Seven and Mariette Hartley.
21	"So Many Pretty Girls, So Little Time"	Elliot Silverstein	Story by : Roy Baldwin; Teleplay by : Robert Towne	February 17, 1964
A philandering publisher (Cliff Robertson) runs into trouble with his boss and attempts to reconnect with his long-suffering wife. It also guest-starred Alan Napier, Ilse Taurins, Mari Blanchard, Bobby Byles, and Barbara Wilkin.
22	"A Child of the Center Ring"	Unknown	Gerald Stanford	February 24, 1964
A young trapeze artist (Susan Strasberg) is mysteriously unable to walk following her famous father's accidental plunge to his death. It also guest-starred Cesare Danova, Fabrizio Mioni, and James Callahan.
23	"The Tides of Darkness"	Paul Wendkos	Jean Holloway	March 2, 1964
A widower's (Edmond O'Brien) only child (Lori Martin) goes into shock after being attacked by an intruder. It also guest-starred Regina Gleason, Herb Armstrong, Patricia Newby, Don Kennedy, Walter Brooke, and Edward Platt.
24	"The Summer House"	Unknown	Merwin Gerard	March 9, 1964
A patient (Piper Laurie) becomes catatonic after a shattering experience brings all her childhood fears into focus. It also guest-starred Robert Loggia, Pamelyn Ferdin, and Phyllis Love.
25	"Shadow of a Starless Night"	Ralph Senensky	Jean Holloway	March 16, 1964
A doctor (Bradford Dillman), who is blinded in an automobile accident, is determined to resume his career with the aid of a guide dog. It also guest-starred Dianne Foster, Charles Robinson, Don Hanmer, and Dan Tobin.
26	"Glass Flowers Never Drop Petals"	Unknown	Milton Merlin & Barbara Merlin	March 23, 1964
A perfectionist (Jessica Tandy) attempts suicide due to midlife anxieties, which belie her seemingly ideal marriage. It also guest-starred James Gregory.
27	"Never Trouble Trouble, Till Trouble Troubles You"	Ralph Senesky	Lorenzo Semple Jr.	March 30, 1964
A boxer (Terry Carter) insists he was knocked out by a hard punch despite the evidence of the boxing commission that he threw the fight. It also guest-starred Frederick O'Neal, Paul Birch, Joel Fluellen, Diana Sands, Rex Ingram, and S. John Launer.
28	"Confounding Her Astronomers"	Paul Wendkos	Scott Morgan	April 6, 1964
An extremely bright, but unadoptable child (Jennifer Gillespie) shares secrets with an imaginary "Gypsy Man", which piques the interest of her co-therapist (Kathleen Nolan). It also guest-starred Peter Leeds, Richard Devon, Virginia Gregg, Dennis Rush, Alice Backes, and Grace Lenard.
29	"I, the Dancer"	Unknown	William D. Gordon	April 20, 1964
A jazz ballet star (Joey Heatherton) and the head of a dance school David Winters find their marriage threatened by a false philosophy. It also guest-starred Michael Callan.
30	"My Hands Are Clean"	David Friedkin	Joel Hammil	April 27, 1964
A loan shark (Telly Savalas) is suddenly marked by stigmata to the consternation of his priest. It also guest-starred Henry Silva, Arline Sax, and Marian Seldes.

== Production ==
Breaking Point was produced by Bing Crosby Productions. George Lefferts was the producer, with Sydney Pollack as the director. Lefferts and Allan Sloane were the writers. It was broadcast on Mondays from 10 to 11 p.m. Eastern Time. Its competition included East Side West Side on CBS and Sing Along with Mitch on NBC.

== Award nomination ==
Sloane was nominated for an Emmy Award for "Outstanding Writing Achievement in Drama".
