= Andrew C. Love =

NBC Radio executive (1894–1987)

- Born: Andrew Christen Andersen Love; October 23, 1894; Bridgeport, Connecticut, U.S.
- Died: December 14, 1987 (aged 93); San Diego, California, U.S.
- Occupation: NBC Radio Director
- Known for: Oregon Shakespeare Festival, producer of national radio broadcast from 1951 to 1973

Andrew C. Love (né Andrew Christen Andersen Love; October 23, 1894 Bridgeport, Connecticut – December 14, 1987 San Diego, California) was an NBC Radio executive on the West Coast in California who worked in multiple roles, mainly as Director of Continuity Acceptance Editing for NBC Radio's Western Division, but also as national radio broadcast producer and director.

== Career ==
=== Early career ===
Before 1914, Love had worked for the Columbia Graphophone Company in Seattle, selling phonographs. In 1914, he became manager of the talking machine department of Kohler & Chase in Seattle, succeeding Harry Welles Dawley (1883–1963), who resigned a short time earlier. In 1918, Love enlisted in the U.S. Army. After being honorably discharged from the Army, Love worked for the San Francisco branch of the Columbia Graphophone Company until 1920, after which, he continued with Columbia, covering territory in the San Joaquin Valley.

=== NBC Radio, San Francisco ===
Beginning around 1930, during radio's Golden Age in America, Love began working for NBC Radio at its West Coast studio center in San Francisco. From 1935 to 1937, he was Director of Continuity Acceptance Editing for NBC Radio in San Francisco. Continuity acceptance editing, essentially, was a form of censoring that covered inappropriate violence, sex, and humor – as well as accuracy, good taste, copyright compliance, quality, and compliance with Federal, state, and local laws. In broadcast radio, the field emerged in the 1930s. By the mid-1930s, all four major networks, NBC, CBS, ABC, and Mutual had national directors and regional managers.

Love, beginning 1936, persuaded the UC Berkeley Extension Division in San Francisco to offer a course on it and Love, himself, taught the first course that year – initially a ten-week course in all branches of continuity writing

=== NBC Radio, Hollywood ===
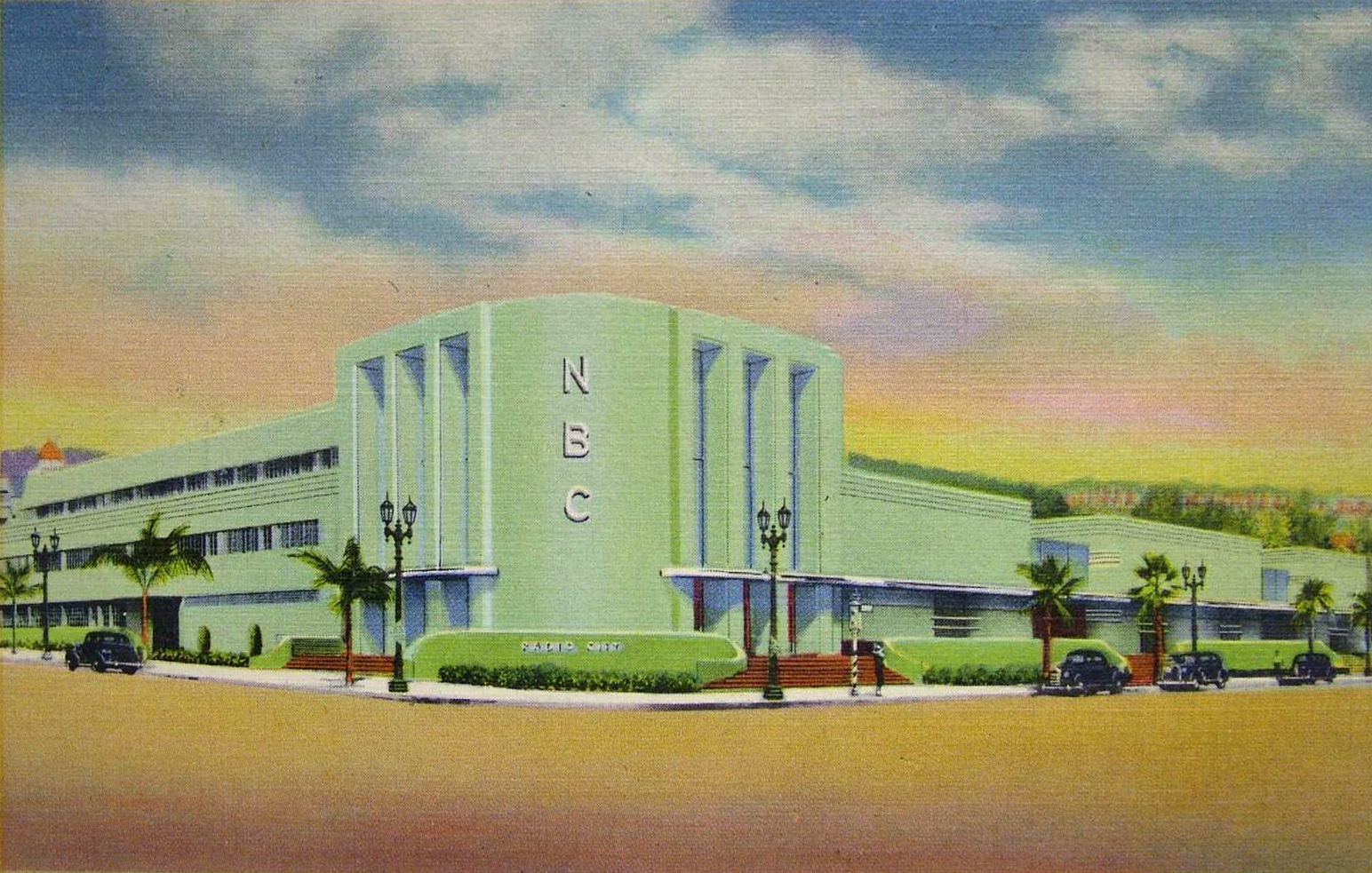
NBC Hollywood Studios that opened in 1938 – located at Sunset Boulevard and Vine Street

NBC transferred Love to its new West Coast studio center in Hollywood and, effective July 1, 1937, Love became director of the entire West Coast Continuity Acceptance Editing division. Janet MacRorie (maiden; 1887–1950) – of NBC Headquarters at Radio City in New York – was the National Director of Continuity Acceptance Editing. The following year, in 1938, NBC opened its new studio facilities, then known as West Coast Radio City, at Sunset Boulevard and Vine Street, Hollywood. The new facilities replaced NBC's radio broadcast center in San Francisco, which had been in service since the network's formation in 1927. The Hollywood facilities served as headquarters to the NBC Radio Networks' West Coast operations. Love, in addition to his executive duties, directed several national broadcast serials, including:

1. Amos 'n' Andy
2. The Dunninger Show
3. 1943–1947: The Bob Burns Show
4. 1948–1951: NBC University Theater
5. 1948–1956: The Eternal Light
6. 1949: Emotion
7. 1950–1951: The Truitts.
8. 1951: The New Theater
9. 1951–1952: NBC Presents: Short Story
10. 1951–1955: Barrie Craig, Confidential Investigator
11. 1853–1954: Rocky Fortune
12. 1953–1954: Last Man Out

Love also persuaded the UCLA Extension division to offer a course on radio writing and on November 3, 1937, he began teaching its inaugural class. From 1951 to 1973, annually, Love produced national NBC radio broadcasts of live performances by the Oregon Shakespeare Festival.

== Other production credits ==
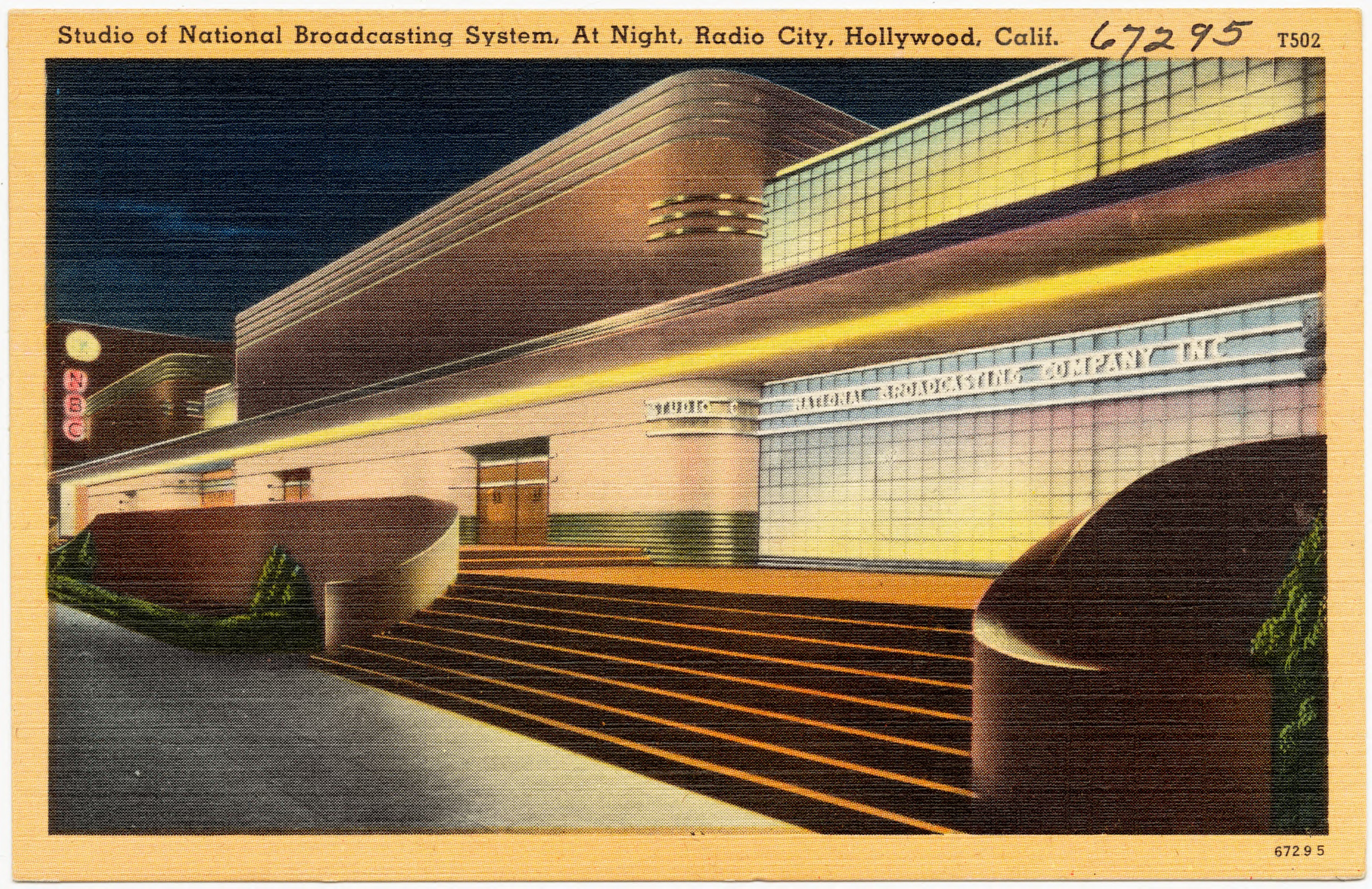
Night image showcasing the Art Deco Streamline Moderne style of NBC Hollywood Studios (aka Radio City Hollywood) at Sunset and Vine

- Andrew C. Love, Producer, 27th Academy Awards, March 30, 1955, NBC Radio and NBC TV
- Andrew C. Love, Producer & Director for NBC Radio, 28th Academy Awards, March 21, 1956, NBC Radio and NBC TV

== Awards ==
Love directed two NBC Radio shows that won Peabody Awards, one in 1948, NBC University Theatre. He also was credited as consultant for a radio production that won a Peabody in 1972, Conversations With Will Shakespeare and Certain of His Friends (series).

== Family ==
Love was born to Danish parents who had immigrated to the United States: Niels Andersen Løve (1868–1908) and Else Marie Mortensen. He was 13 years old when his father died. The surname "Løve," in Danish, translates to "Lion." Love, on October 9, 1920, married Hazel Rae Layton (maiden; 1893–1984) in Alameda County. Layton, before marrying, had worked for the talking machine department of the Fresno store of the Wiley B. Allen Co.

== See also ==
- Pre-Code Hollywood (in reference to continuity acceptance editor)

== Notes and references ==
=== Notes ===
1. There may be some confusion between Andrew Christian Love, the NBC producer of this article, and Andrew Jackson Love (1911–1982), jazz singer with the Tune Twisters because of a column on December 9, 1976, in the Greater Oregon, by E.M. Mitchell saying that the two are one and the same.
