= NBC Presents: Short Story =

American radio dramatic anthology series (1951–1952)

NBC Presents: Short Story is a half-hour American radio program offering dramatizations of contemporary American short stories that began on NBC on February 21, 1951, and ended on May 30, 1952. The primary goal of the series, as stated by script editor Hugh Kemp, was to combat what appeared to be a widespread lack of respect for the short story as a form. "America's serious writers have, by and large, put into their short stories the same kind of penetrating insight that has gone into their widely read novels. [...] In this series we hope to get some of the material off the dusty shelves and out into the homes of the vast audience of radio."

Throughout the program's run, episodes were directed by Andrew C. Love. Overall supervision of production was by Margaret Cuthbert and Wade Arnold, and the announcers were Lamont Johnson, Don Stanley and John Wald. Cast members included Fritz Feld, Lucien Prival, John Dodsworth, Robert Boon and Ramsay Hill, as well as Hy Averback, Parley Baer, Jeff Corey, Howard Culver, John Dehner, Georgia Ellis, Paul Frees, Virginia Gregg, Isabel Jewell, Jack Kruschen, Alma Lawton, Felix Nelson, Dan O'Herlihy and Barney Phillips.

== First series ==
Broadcasting from Hollywood, the series premiered on February 21, 1951, on NBC with an adaptation of "Fifty Grand" by Ernest Hemingway. Script editor Kemp supervised adaptations by George Lefferts, Ernest Kinoy, Clarise A. Ross, and Vincent McConnor. The series was first heard on Wednesdays at 10:30 p.m. EST and then moved in May to Fridays at 8 p.m. Featuring stories by Conrad Aiken, Ring Lardner, Sherwood Anderson, Stephen Vincent Benét, and John Steinbeck, the first series continued until July 13. Brooklyn College cooperated with NBC by scheduling a literary appreciation course with a Short Story tie-in. This was part of NBC's College by Radio plan.

== Second series ==
Moving to Fridays at 9:30 p.m. EST, the second series ran from November 23, 1951, to March 14, 1952, with William Welch as script editor and Wade Arnold as executive producer. The College by Radio plan was discontinued. Stories in the second series were by Benét, Ray Bradbury ("The Rocket"), James M. Cain, Erskine Caldwell. John Cheever, Anton Chekhov, John Galsworthy, Graham Greene, Lardner, Steinbeck, Frank Stockton, Ben Ames Williams and others.

== Third series ==
The third series ran from April 11 to May 30, 1952, with stories by Nell Bell, John Collier ("De Mortuis"), Eric Knight, William Daniel Steele, James Street, James A. Michener and James Thurber.

== Similar programs ==
There were several related shows that also offered literary adaptations: Best Plays (1952–53), Short Short Story, and The World's Great Novels (1944–48). With "the best published short shorts... originals by famous authors", Short Short Story was a 15-minute daytime drama series that aired three days a week.

== Listen to ==
- Internet Archive: NBC Short Story
