= Malcolm Edwards =

British science fiction editor and publisher (1949–2026)

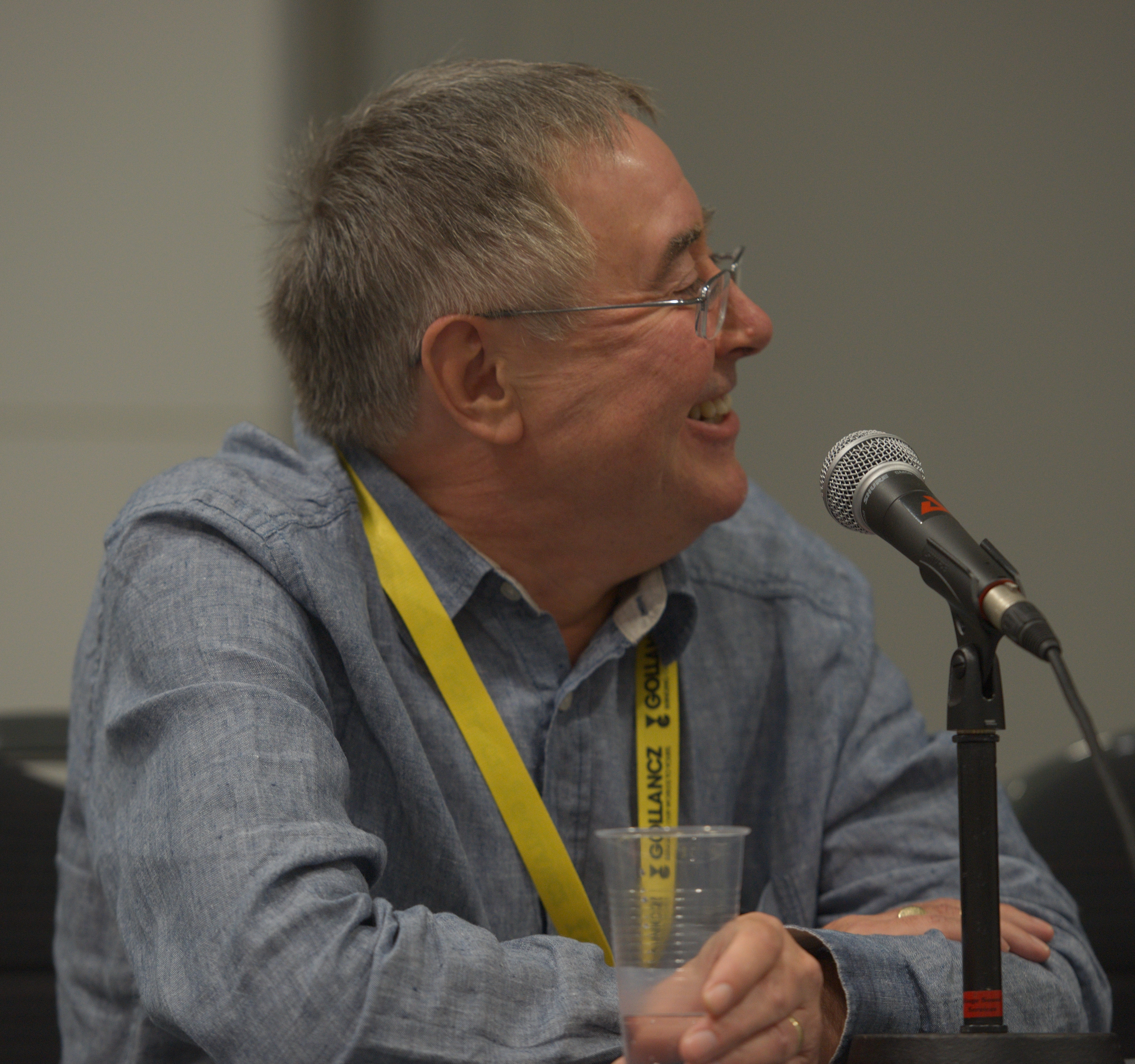
- Edwards on a panel discussing The Encyclopedia of Science Fiction at the 72nd Worldcon in 2014
- Born: Malcolm John Edwards; 3 December 1949
- Died: 3 October 2026 (aged 76)
- Education: University of Cambridge
- Occupations: Editor; publisher; critic

Malcolm John Edwards (3 December 1949 – 3 October 2026) was a British editor, publisher and critic in the science fiction field. An alumnus of The Haberdashers' Aske's Boys' School, he received his degree from the University of Cambridge. He was Deputy CEO at the Orion Publishing Group up until 2015, when he stepped down to become the chairman of science fiction publishing house Gollancz. Edwards lived in London with his wife, the CEO of a public relations company.

Edwards edited a number of publications including: Vector, the critical journal of the British Science Fiction Association, (from 1972 to 1974), and the science fiction anthology Constellations (Gollancz, 1980). He served as science fiction editor for Victor Gollancz Ltd, which later led to him launching the SF Masterworks series at Orion in 1999.

He was at one time highly active in science fiction fandom. When he first began contributing to British science fiction fanzines, he was initially confused with "Malcolm Edwards", a pseudonym used several years earlier by Peter Weston. He was Director of the Science Fiction Foundation for much of the two decades it was at the North East London Polytechnic. He also served as initial Chairman of the 45th World Science Fiction Convention. He was a Guest of Honour at Loncon 3, the 72nd World Science Fiction Convention, from 14 to 18 August 2014.

Edwards died from complications of Parkinson's disease on 3 October 2026, aged 76.

== Career ==
- 1976–1989 Gollancz, started as staff copy-editor, ended as Publishing Director
- 1989–1991 Grafton, Publishing Director
- 1991–1997 HarperCollins Trade Division, Publishing Director, then Deputy Managing Director
- 1998–2019 Orion Books, first as Managing Director of Orion Books, then Deputy Chief Executive and Group Publisher since September 2003, and as Chair of Gollancz from 2009
- 2019 onwards Wellbeck Publishing Group, as Publisher of André Deutsch

As editor, Edwards worked with J. G. Ballard (he edited Empire of the Sun), Tom Clancy, Philip K. Dick, Stephen King, William Gibson, Robert Ludlum, James Patterson, Robert Holdstock, Terry Pratchett and many others.

== Awards ==
- 1996 British Book Awards: Imprint & Editor of the Year
- 1983 BSFA Awards: Best Short Fiction (After Images)
- 2019 Alfie Awards: For Editing
