= 2000 Plus =

American old-time radio series

- Lon Clark
- Genre: science fiction
- Country of origin: US
- Language: English
- Home station: MBS
- Original release: 15 March 1950 – 2 January 1952
- No. of episodes: 88

2000 Plus (a.k.a. Two Thousand Plus and 2000+) was an American old-time radio series that ran on the Mutual Broadcasting System from March 15, 1950, to January 2, 1952, in various 30-minute time slots. A Dryer Weenolsen production, it was the first adult science fiction series on radio, airing one month prior to the better-known Dimension X.

2000 Plus was an anthology program, using all-new material rather than adapting published stories. The series was the creation of Sherman H. Dryer (1913–1989) who scripted and produced the series with Robert Weenolsen (1900–1979).

== Cast ==
Dryer directed cast members Lon Clark, Joseph Julian, Henry Norell, Bill Keene, Bryna Raeburn and Amzie Strickland and others. Emerson Buckley conducted the music composed by Elliott Jacoby. Ken Marvin was the program's announcer, and the sound effects were by Adrian Penner.

The nature of the series is indicated in the titles of 1950 episodes: "The Brooklyn Brain", "The Flying Saucers", "The Robot Killer", "Rocket and the Skull", "A Veteran Comes Home", "Men from Mars", "When the Machines Went Wild", "When the Worlds Met", "The Insect", "Silent Noise", "The Green Thing", "The Giant Walks", and "Worlds Apart". There are 32 known episodes, and only some of these – up to 15 (or, perhaps, more) – have survived.

In Science Fiction Television (2004), M. Keith Booker wrote:

It was not until the 1950s that science fiction radio really hit its stride, even as science fiction was beginning to appear on television as well. Radio programs such as Mutual's 2000 Plus and NBC's Dimension X were anthology series that offered a variety of exciting tales of future technology, with a special focus on space exploration (including alien invasion), though both series also often reflected contemporary anxieties about the dangers of technology.

== See also ==
- List of 2000 Plus episodes
- X Minus One
