= List of 2000 Plus episodes =

List of episodes for the 2000 Plus radio show.

== 1950 ==
Title	Air Date	Author	Listen
1. Hosts Above the Thunder	03/15/50		
2. Journey Into the Germ World	03/22/50		
3. Men From Mars	03/29/50		mp3, mp3, RealMedia
4. The Diamond Skull	04/05/50		
5. The Man Who Conquered Time	04/12/50		
6. Rocket to the Moon	04/19/50		
7. When the Machines Went Wild	04/26/50		These recordings start about five to eight minutes into the program: mp3, mp3, RealMedia
8. When the Worlds Met	05/03/50		mp3, mp3, RealMedia
9. Silent Noise	05/10/50		
10. The Insect	05/17/50		mp3, mp3, RealMedia
11. The Man Who Tried to Stop June 8	05/24/50		
12. The First Men	05/31/50		
13. The Other Man	06/07/50		mp3
14. The Earth Versus Alexander Corday	06/14/50		
15. The Brooklyn Brain	06/21/50		mp3, RealMedia
16. Space Wreck	06/28/50		mp3
17. A Veteran Comes Home	07/05/50		mp3, mp3, RealMedia
18. The Flower of Evil	07/23/50		
19. Explorers From Space	07/19/50		
20. The Living Dead	07/26/50		
21. The Doom Machine	08/02/50		
24. The Flying Saucers	08/23/50		mp3, mp3, RealMedia
25. The Robot Killer	08/30/50		mp3, mp3, RealMedia
26. Rocket and the Skull	09/06/50		mp3, mp3, RealMedia
29. Green Thing	09/27/50		mp3, mp3
30. That Which Lives in a Steel Head	10/04/50		
35. The Giant Walks	11/08/50		mp3, mp3, RealMedia
36. Worlds Apart	11/15/50		mp3, RealAudio, RealMedia

== 1951 ==
Title	Air Date	Author	Listen
68. The Man From the Second Earth	08/12/51		
77. The Rocket and The Skull	10-10-51		
88. The Temples of the Pharaohs	12/26/51		mp3

== Notes ==
- Some sites offering CDs also include episodes of the series 2000X, which was produced in 2000 and is not part of the original series run.
