= NBC University Theatre =

Series of radio programs

The World's Great Novels
- Portion of 1945 NBC advertisement promoting the NBC University of the Air
- Genre: Dramatic anthology, adaptations of great novels, with programs for college credit
- Running time: 1 hour
- Language: English
- Syndicates: NBC Radio
- Written by: Albert Harris (music), Ernest Kinoy, George Lefferts, Claris A. Ross, Richard E. Davis
- Directed by: Andrew C. Love
- Original release: 30 July 1948 – 14 February 1951
- Podcast: A 1949 adaptation of Jane Eyre

NBC University Theater (also known as NBC University Theater of the Air, NBC Theater of the Air or NBC Theater) was a brand the National Broadcasting Co. applied to a category of radio programming. Although it was not actually a university, some colleges and universities participated by including some of the programming in their curriculum. NBC University Theater's most well-known radio series was The World's Great Novels. NBC used the name "University Theater" or similar from about 1923–1947.

== Description ==
Most NBC University Theater programming aired on NBC's Red Network, but the Blue Network (later to become ABC) also participated. The Armed Forces Radio Network also distributed some of the programs. About 1948, NBC replaced this category with NBC Presents.

=== The World's Great Novels ===
The World's Great Novels was one of the radio series included in NBC University Theater. The series was produced by Margaret Cuthbert and directed by Homer Heck. It presented adaptations of classic novels, often described as "Anglo-American literature." The show was born The World's Great Novels on WMAQ, Chicago, and NBC from 1944 to 1948, and adopted its better known name when it relocated to Hollywood in July 1948.It initially aired Saturdays at 7:00 pm CST during the first 1944–45 season and then moved to Fridays at 11:30 pm. Music for the series was composed by Emil Soderstrom (né Emil Otto Edvard Söderström; 1901–1972) and conducted by Bernard "Whitey" Berquist (né Bernard H. Berquist; 1903–1962).

The Chicago-based programs were a production of The NBC University of the Air. Through agreements with the University of Louisville, the University of Tulsa, Kansas State Teachers College, and Washington State College, listeners could receive college credit through accredited, radio-assisted literature correspondence courses. A study guide, The Handbook of the World's Great Novels, was available for 25 cents.

The series began October 28, 1944, with Henry Fielding's Tom Jones, followed by Voltaire's Candide and Jane Austen's Emma. Over the next four years, it aired adaptations of such novels as Kidnapped, The Last of the Mohicans, Thomas Hardy's The Mayor of Casterbridge, Moby-Dick, A Tale of Two Cities and War and Peace. Since this was a half-hour program, many of the novels were serialized in multi-part adaptations of two to six 30-minute episodes.

==== Chicago actors ====
The group of Chicago actors heard on the series included Larry Alexander, Ernie Andrews, Everett Clarke, Johnny Coons, Maurice Copeland, Harry Elders, Sidney Ellstrom, Charles Flynn, Donald Gallagher, Hilda Graham, Ken Griffin, Jonathan Hole, Geraldine Kay, Eloise Kummer, Jack Lester (né Jack Lester Swineford; 1915–2004), Ken Nordine, Hope Summers and Lee Young. Some episodes were narrated by Nordine. The announcers were Charles Chan, John Conrad and Dave Garroway.

==== Guest commentators ====
Some shows in the series had guest speakers. Amy Loveman, an editor with The Saturday Review of Literature, was the guest commentator with the 1944 adaptation of Emma. The novelist Ida Alexa Ross Wylie was the guest commenting on Charles Dickens' The Pickwick Papers. The adaptation of Theodore Dreiser's Free (July 9, 1948) featured a brief talk by the Dean of the University of Chicago.

On July 23, 1948, the final program featured readings from different works by Thomas Wolfe.

The series was retooled by Cuthbert and renamed NBC University Theater (aka NBC University Theater of the Air, NBC Theater of the Air and NBC Theater) and moved from Chicago to Hollywood. That series was heard from July 30, 1948, to February 14, 1951. In the new format, the program also included adaptations of short stories and plays in addition to novels and occasionally featured commentary on the original work by distinguished writers and critics. The new series won a Peabody Award in 1948 and was considered one of the most distinguished radio programs of its day; all the episodes from this period still survive.

The NBC University of the Air also produced a summer replacement series, American Novels, which was broadcast when The World's Great Novels was off during the summers of 1947 and 1948.

Some sources give the title of the 1944–48 series as The World's Greatest Novels, but there is no evidence this title was ever used.

== List of NBC University Theater series ==
A partial list.

=== NBC University of the Air series ===
- 1923–26 NBC University of The Air Talk
- 1925–35 NBC University of The Air
- 1928 Music Lectures
- 1944–45 The American Story
- 1944 Pursuit of Learning
- 1944–45 We Came This Way
- 1944 They Call Me Joe
- 1944–48 The Worlds Great Novels
- 1945 The Story of Music
- 1944–46 The Land of The Free
- 1946 Featuring Our Families
- 1946 Tales of The Foreign Service
- 1947 American Novels

=== NBC Inter-American University of The Air series ===
Between 1942 and 1946, NBC made a distinction between the "University of the Air" and the "Inter-American University of the Air". The former tended to be focused on the United States while the latter was more global.

- July 6, 1942 The Lands of The Free
- October 10, 1942 Music of The New World
- 1943 For This We Fight
- 1943 Music of The New World
- 1944 The Department of State Speaks
- 1944–45 The American Story
- 1945 Our Foreign Policy
- 1946 Your United Nations
- 1946 Home Around The World
- 1946 Concert of Nations

== See also ==
- Short story
- NBC Presents: Short Story

== Listen to ==
- Megalo: NBC University Theater: A Farewell to Arms by Ernest Hemingway
