= Special for Women =

1960s TV series about problems faced by women

- Cover of the 1962 book collection of screenplays.
- Genre: Drama, soap opera, documentary
- Created by: George Lefferts
- Written by: George Lefferts; John T. Dugan; John Furia Jr.
- Directed by: Karl Genus; William A. Graham; H. Wesley Kenney; George Lefferts; Seymour Robbie; Lela Swift
- Composer: Michael Hennigan
- Country of origin: United States
- Original language: English
- No. of seasons: 3

Original release
- Network: NBC
- Release: 1960 – 1965

Special for Women (also known as Purex Specials for Women) is an American daytime drama/documentary TV series that ran on NBC from 1960 to 1965, and also aired in England, Canada and Australia. The show dramatised problems faced by everyday women such as menopause, sexual dysfunction and the feminine beauty ideal, followed by a discussion of that episode's topic with a panel of experts.

The screenplays, mostly written by George Lefferts, were based on hundreds of hours of interviews with real women, social workers and mental health professionals. Lefferts told the Chillicothe Gazette:

All the women I spoke to weren't in the least reticent about giving me the story of their lives. Most people don't have anyone to talk to, I think. After the war, there was a basic revision of woman's role and a social lag in our attitudes hasn't caught up with it... And there is a groundswell of female opinion against the idea that the wife, after being educated for a career, belongs in the home... We have tried to present the attitudes and emotions as well as the facts. Here we try to capture the essence of reality.

The show's first season of eight episodes aired from 1960 to 1961. A second and third season of three episodes each followed in 1962 and 1964–65. Special for Women dealt with increasingly controversial topics as it went on, including the abuse and molestation of children. Dinah Shore provided narration for Season 3.

== Reception ==
Considered a groundbreaking show in its time, Special for Women received critical acclaim and several awards, including a 1962 Emmy for Outstanding Daytime Program and a nomination for Outstanding Writing Achievement in the Documentary Field.

According to Lefferts, over half of the many letters received from viewers were from women asking for the episodes to be replayed in evening timeslots so that their husbands could watch after coming home from work. He also quoted a letter from a "Milwaukee women's club" which read: "We are all in agreement that it is our husbands who just can't understand. Trying to explain is like talking to a brick wall. This program is worth a thousand explanations that we could possibly try to make."

In Australia, The Age noted that the series was considered "controversial" and had provoked an "intense reaction" when shown in Melbourne.

Buoyed by the success of Special for Women, Lefferts went to write and produce numerous other TV projects that dealt with mental health including 1963's Breaking Point and a 1966 series in a similar vein, Confidential for Women.

== Availability ==
Special for Women has never been released on home video and it is unknown how much of it was preserved. Some episodes are known to have survived in television archives such as the Paley Center for Media ("The Cold Woman", "Change of Life" "Mother and Daughter"), the Library of Congress ("The Lonely Woman") and the UCLA Film and Television Archive ("A Child in Danger" and "The Menace of Age"), where episodes are available to view on-site for research purposes only. Others may exist elsewhere, but for most audiences the show remains unavailable.

== Book collection ==
A collection of eight screenplays from Season 1 of the series, alongside commentary on the relevant social issues, was published in paperback by Avon Books in 1962. Special for Women: Eight Plays by George Lefferts is out of print but is legally available to be borrowed and read online via the Internet Archive. It remains the only relatively accessible way for most people to experience the show. The introduction was written by Margaret Mead, who noted:

One of the unfortunate elements of contemporary TV is that it happens only once... All the imaginative effort of putting on a full-dress TV show [lives and dies] in a single hour, surviving only in the memories of those who saw them and the regrets of those who did not... So the publication in book form of the plays which were developed to embody the themes of this program is a third kind of experiment. Instead of vanishing into the ether, the plays themselves, still in their setting of expert discussion, are here to be read.

== List of episodes ==
=== Season 1 ===
No.	Title	Directed by	Written by	Original release date
1	"The Cold Woman"	William A. Graham	George Lefferts	October 14, 1960
Leora Davis (Kim Hunter) confronts her sexual frigidity with her husband, Charles (Jack Klugman).
2	"The Trapped Housewife"	Karl Genus	George Lefferts	November 10, 1960
Wilhemina "Willie" Ross (Phyllis Thaxter) realises she is dissatisfied with her life as a housewife when she leaves a note for the milkman that reads "Help." She confronts this with her husband, Mike (Michael Strong).
3	"The Working Mother"	H. Wesley Kenney	George Lefferts	December 8, 1960
Laura Tyler (Leora Dana) has been accused of child neglect simply because she works a job in addition to raising children. With her husband, Ross (Whitfield Connor), she confronts the existential issues around working women in society.
4	"The Single Woman"	William A. Graham	George Lefferts	February 2, 1961
A troubled single woman (Barbara Baxley) is torn between a single man (Michael Tolan) and an affair with a married man (Patrick O'Neal).
5	"Mother and Daughter"	George Lefferts	George Lefferts	March 9, 1961
A mother and daughter, Ruth (Patricia Neal) and Jeannie Evans (Lynn Loring), confront their mutual resentment of each other.
6	"Change of Life"	Seymour Robbie	George Lefferts	April 13, 1961
As Minna Borden (Sylvia Sidney) goes through menopause, she reflects on her life, her regrets and her missed opportunities.
7	"What's Wrong with Men?"	Lela Swift	George Lefferts	October 19, 1961
Henry Fellow (James Daly) is dissatisfied with his office job and life in general. He confronts this with his wife, Helen (Lori March).
8	"The Glamour Trap"	Lela Swift	George Lefferts	November 16, 1961
Five women at a beauty salon (Glenda Farrell, Meg Mundy, Marian Seldes, Lenka Peterson and Barbara Dana) face the pressures of society to conform to the feminine beauty ideal.

=== Season 2 ===
No.	Title	Directed by	Written by	Original release date
9	"The Lonely Woman"	Lela Swift	Elisabeth Dutton and George Lefferts	January 8, 1962
Martha Sloan (Nan Martin) is married and has a full social life on the surface of things, but secretly, she deeply fears loneliness.
10	"The Indiscriminate Woman"	Will Lorin	Will Lorin	February 1, 1962
A couple (Carol Lawrence and Dane Clark) break off their engagement after the woman's promiscuity comes to light.
11	"The Problem Child"	Lela Swift	George Lefferts	April 19, 1962
A report that a nine-year-old child has been pushed down a flight of stairs by his father (Simon Oakland) leads a social worker (Darren McGavin) to investigate. Conflicting stories are heard in a Rashomon-like fashion, including from the child's mother (Norma Crane). Investigation then reveals a wide range of social problems at play. The child is not depicted.

=== Season 3 ===
No.	Title	Directed by	Written by	Original release date
12	"A Child in Danger"	Paul Nickell	John T. Dugan	October 28, 1964
A female lawyer (Nina Foch) reluctantly defends a male client (Martin Landau) who has been accused of molesting a child. (This episode was originally titled "The Child Molester" but this was changed at the sponsor's request.)
13	"The Menace of Age"	Paul Stanley	John Furia Jr.	December 10, 1964
Barbara Lawson (Jeanette Nolan) suffers a stroke, and her doctor suggests that she and her husband Joe (Arthur O'Connell) live with their daughter's family.
14	"Just a Housewife"	Unknown	John T. Dugan	February 26, 1965
Jacquie Hunter (Nancy Gates) is sick of being thought of as "just a housewife" and wishes to leave her husband Matt (Barry Nelson) to work for a career-oriented woman (Jeff Donnell). Also starring Jeanne Bal.
