= Constellations: Stories of the Future =

1980 short story anthology

Constellations
- First edition
- Author: Edited by Malcolm Edwards
- Cover artist: Stuart Hughes
- Language: English
- Genre: Science fiction anthology
- Publisher: Victor Gollancz Ltd
- Publication date: 1980
- Publication place: United States
- Media type: Print (paperback)
- Pages: 189
- ISBN: 0-575-02838-6

Constellations: Stories of the Future (1980) is a science fiction anthology of short stories edited by Malcolm Edwards and published by Gollancz.

== Contents ==
- Introduction by Malcolm Edwards
- "Light of Other Days" by Bob Shaw (1966)
- "A Pail of Air" by Fritz Leiber (1951)
- "Beyond Lies the Wub" by Philip K. Dick (1952)
- "Let's Go to Golgotha!" by Garry Kilworth (1974)
- "Of Mist, and Grass, and Sand" by Vonda N. McIntyre (1973)
- "Harrison Bergeron" by Kurt Vonnegut, Jr. (1961)
- "Rescue Operation" by Harry Harrison (1964)
- "It's a Good Life" by Jerome Bixby (1953)
- "Mister Da V." by Kit Reed (1962)
- "Billennium" by J. G. Ballard (1961)
- "The Store of the Worlds" by Robert Sheckley (1959)
- "The Wind from the Sun" by Arthur C. Clarke (1964)
- About the Authors (uncredited)
