= Barrie Craig, Confidential Investigator =

Detective radio drama (1951 to 1955)

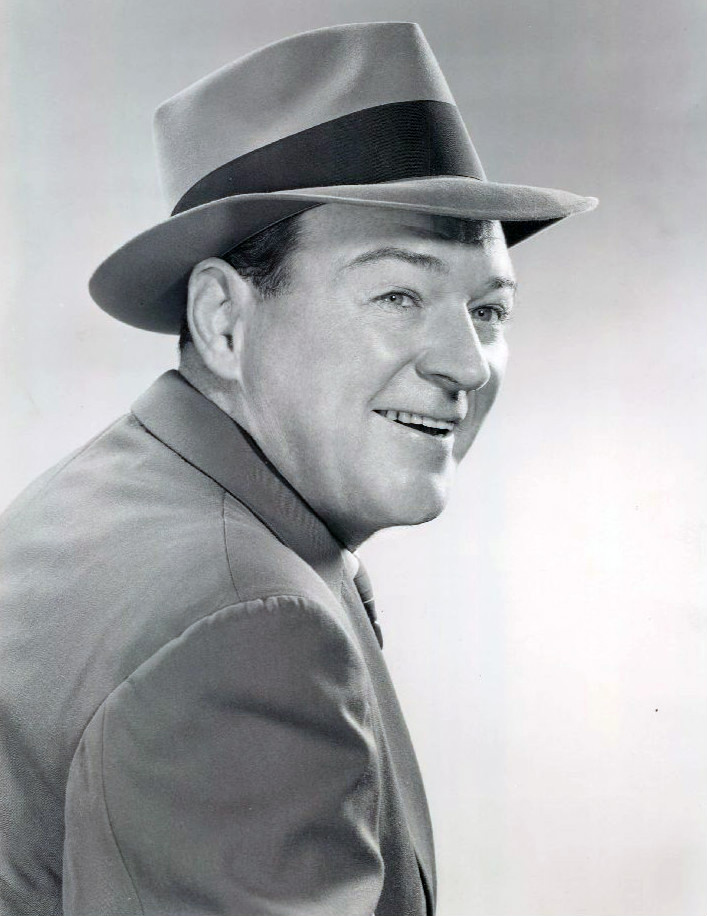
- William Gargan as Barrie Craig
- Genre: Detective drama
- Running time: 30 minutes
- Country of origin: United States
- Language: English
- Syndicates: NBC
- Starring: William Gargan
- Announcer: Don Pardo
- Written by: Richard Leonard; Peggy Blake
- Directed by: Himan Brown; Arthur Jacobson; Andrew C. Love

Barrie Craig, Confidential Investigator was a detective drama heard on NBC Radio from October 3, 1951 to June 30, 1955.

== Overview ==
Detective Barrie Craig (William Gargan) worked alone from his Madison Avenue office. Unlike his contemporaries Sam Spade and Philip Marlowe, Craig had a laid-back personality, somewhat cutting against the popular hard-boiled detective stereotype. Others in the cast included Ralph Bell, Elspeth Eric, Parker Fennelly, Santos Ortega, Arnold Moss, Parley Baer, Virginia Gregg and Betty Lou Gerson.

Don Pardo was the announcer. The program was broadcast on Wednesdays at 10 p.m. Eastern Time. Writers included John Roeburt.

== TV pilot ==
Gargan also starred in the role in an unsuccessful 1952 TV pilot written and directed by Blake Edwards. It was presented on ABC's Pepsi-Cola Playhouse as "Death the Hard Way" (October 17, 1954).

John Roeburt was the head writer for the series.

A few years earlier Gargan had played a similar character in Martin Kane, Private Eye.
