= The Light (short story) =

1957 short story by Poul Anderson

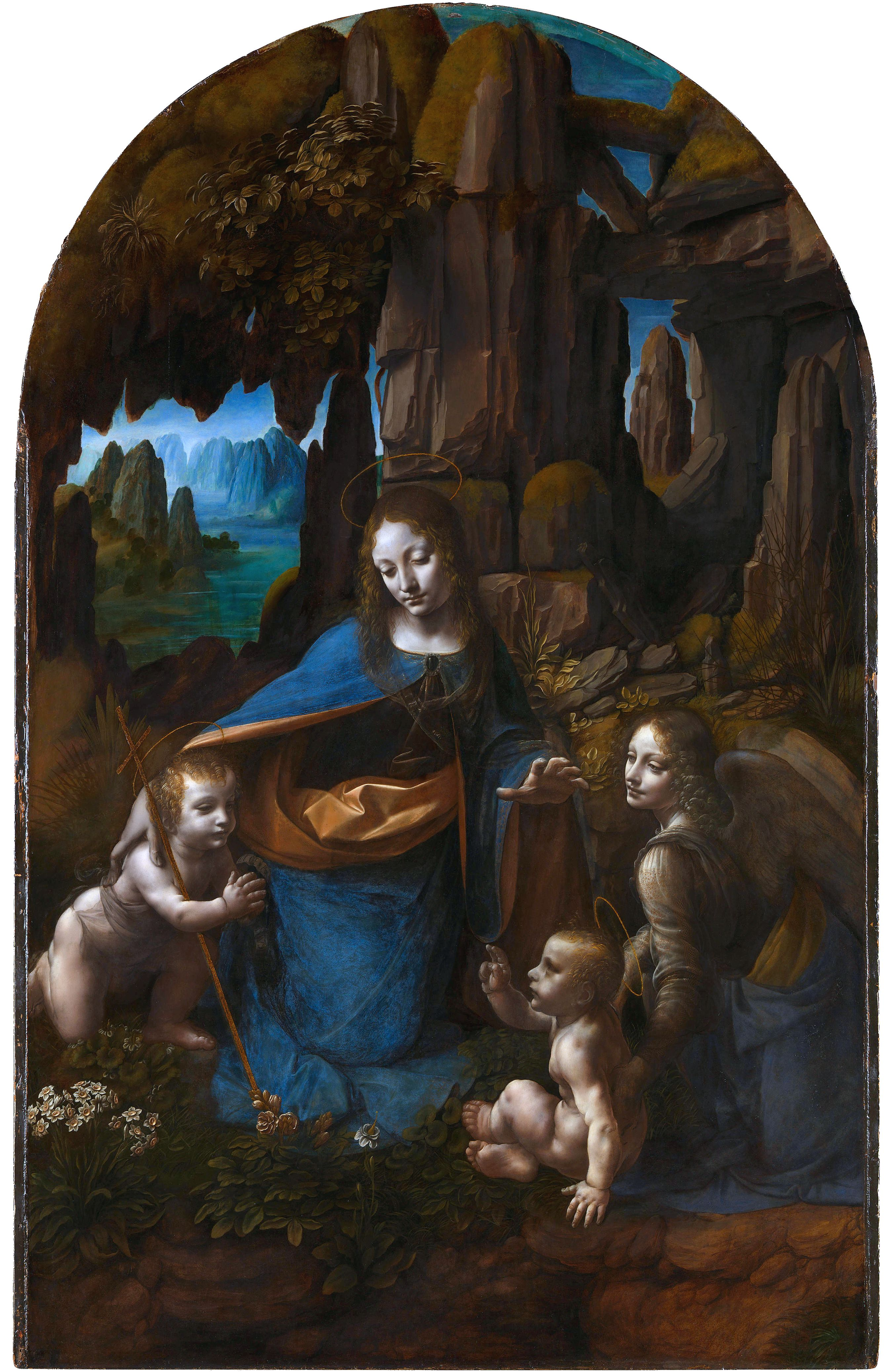
London version of Virgin of the Rocks

The Light is a science fiction short story by Poul Anderson. It was first published in Galaxy Science Fiction magazine in March 1957. The plot concerns the crew of a spaceship from the United States landing on the Moon during a period of intense Cold War tension, and the possibly disastrous consequences of their discovery there.

The story is framed as the account of an unnamed narrator telling a professor of art history about their upcoming secret mission, and why it is so critical. Besides his skills in science and mathematics, the narrator is also interested in the art of the Old Masters.

== Plot ==
The narrator tells how he and two others, Baird, the commander, and Hernandez, the engineer, flew the spaceship Benjamin Franklin to the Moon, landing just outside the crater Plato.

After completing routine exploration and sampling, the crew decide to trek up the crater wall of Plato. When they reach a point where they can see into the crater, they notice outgassing taking place below them. The narrator wants to investigate the cloud of vapor, but Baird opposes this until Hernandez intervenes. Climbing down, they reach a flat ledge under the vapor cloud, with the sunlight acting on the cloud to produce a light that the narrator finds strangely familiar. Then, to their shock, they find footprints that seem to have been made by hobnailed boots. Believing that the Soviet Union has secretly landed on the Moon, Baird insists on returning to the ship to report this, but the narrator wants to follow the prints back to their source. Eventually he goes alone down to the crater floor and finds traces of a camp, the tracks of some kind of vehicle, but no trace of a rocket. He then notices the shape of the Christian cross etched into a rock. Barely making it back to the ship before his suit's power and air run out, the narrator says he knows who was there before them.

Believing that the previous explorer must have had access to some revolutionary technology, technology that could win or start a war, the narrator reveals to the professor that the light he saw on the ledge was the same as that used in the painting Virgin of the Rocks, and that their mission is to search museums and old papers to find some clue as to how Leonardo da Vinci could have walked on the Moon.

== Adaptation ==
"The Light" was adapted into an episode of the NBC radio series X Minus One, broadcast on October 24, 1957, 20 days after the launch of Sputnik 1.
