= List of Peabody Award winners (1940–1949) =

Peabody Award winners and honorable mentions.

== 1940s ==
=== 1940 ===
Recipient	Area of Excellence
CBS Radio	Public Service by a Network
Elmer Davis, CBS Radio	Best Reporting of the News
KFRU Radio, Columbia, Missouri	Public Service by a Small Station
WGAR Radio, Cleveland, Ohio	Public Service by a Medium-sized Station
WLW Radio, Cincinnati, Ohio	Public Service by a Large Station
Honorable Mentions
KNX Radio, Los Angeles, California	Meritorious Service to a Localized Area
KSTP Radio, St. Paul, Minnesota	for America Calling
KVOS Radio, Bellingham, Washington	for Promoting Better Understanding Between Canada and the United States Through Its Armistice Day Program
WBAP Radio, Fort Worth, Texas	Series of Prison Broadcasts
WBNX Radio, New York, New York	Public Service to Foreign Language Groups in New York
WCAU Radio, Philadelphia, Pennsylvania	Wake Up America, Contribution to National Defense
WGEO Radio (shortwave), Schenectady, New York	Service to the Byrd South Pole Expedition
WJJD Radio, Chicago, Illinois	Service to Education in Broadcasts to Schools
WJZ Radio, New York, New York	Town Meeting of the Air
WLS Radio, Chicago, Illinois	for Meritorious Service to Agriculture
WOR Radio, New York, New York	The American Forum of the Air
WOW Radio, Omaha, Nebraska	The President's Birthday Ball of 1940
WQXR Radio, New York, New York	High Standards of Musical Progress
WRC and WMAL Radio, Washington, D.C.	Mile of Dimes
WSB Radio, Atlanta, Georgia	Distinguished Public Service Contributions

=== 1941 ===
Recipient	Area of Excellence
CBS Radio, Cecil Brown	Outstanding Reporting of the News.
Norman Corwin	We Hold These Truths, a celebration of the 150th anniversary of the United States Bill of Rights, Outstanding Entertainment in Drama.
The International Shortwave Broadcasters of the United States	Outstanding Public Service by Stations.
Mutual Broadcasting System and Alfred Wallenstein (WOR Radio)	for Outstanding Entertainment in Music.
NBC Radio	University of Chicago Round Table, Outstanding Educational Program.
NBC Radio (WEAF)	Against the Storm, Outstanding Entertainment in Drama.

=== 1942 ===
Recipient	Area of Excellence
CBS Radio	The Man Behind the Gun, Outstanding Entertainment in Drama. (produced by William N. Robson)
CBS Radio, Charles Collingwood	for Outstanding Reporting of the News.
KOAC Radio, Corvallis, Oregon	Our Hidden Enemy, Venereal Disease, Outstanding Public Service by a Local Station.
NBC Pacific Coast Network	The Standard Symphony, Outstanding Entertainment in Music.
WCHS Radio, Charleston, West Virginia	The Home Front, Outstanding Public Service by a Regional Station.
WHA Radio	Afield with Ranger Mac, Outstanding Educational Program.

=== 1943 ===
Recipient	Area of Excellence
ABC Radio (The Blue Network)	America's Town Meeting of the Air, Outstanding Educational Program.
CBS Radio	Lux Radio Theater, Outstanding Entertainment in Drama.
CBS Radio	Let's Pretend, Outstanding Children's Program.
CBS Radio	An Open Letter to the American People, Outstanding Entertainment in Drama. (written and produced by William N. Robson)
CBS Radio, Edward R. Murrow	Outstanding Reporting of the News.
Bob Hope	a Personal Award.
KNX Radio, Los Angeles, California	These Are Americans, Outstanding Community Service by a Regional Station.
KSL Radio, Salt Lake City, Utah	Music and the Spoken Word, Outstanding Entertainment in Music.
KYA Radio, San Francisco, California	Calling Longshoremen, Outstanding Community Service by a Local Station.
Honorable Mentions
NBC Radio	Outstanding Educational Program Inter-American University of the Air, "The Lands of the Free".
WSNJ Radio, Bridgeton, New Jersey	Outstanding Community Service by a Local Station, Junior Commandos.

=== 1944 ===
Recipient	Area of Excellence
ABC Radio (The Blue Network), Raymond Gram Swing	for Outstanding News Commentary.
Fred Allen, CBS Radio	a Personal Award.
KFI Radio, Los Angeles, California	Philharmonic Young Artists Series, Outstanding Program for Youth.
Col. Edward M. Kirby, Chief Radio Branch, War Department	a Personal Award.
Mutual Broadcasting System	Human Adventure, Outstanding Educational Program.
NBC Radio	Cavalcade of America, Outstanding Entertainment in Drama.
NBC Radio	Telephone Hour, Outstanding Entertainment in Music.
WIBX Radio, Utica, New York	Cross-Rhoads, Outstanding Public Service by a Local Station.
WLW Radio, Cincinnati, Ohio	Outstanding Reporting of News.
WNYC Radio and Mayor Fiorello La Guardia, New York, New York	Outstanding Public Service by a Local Station.
WTAG Radio, Worcester, Massachusetts	Worcester and the World, Outstanding Public Service by a Regional Station.
Honorable Mentions
KMOX Radio, St. Louis, Missouri	St. Louis Speaks.
KOIN Radio, Portland, Oregon	Song of the Columbia.
KVOO Radio, Tulsa, Oklahoma	Southwest Forum.
WFBL Radio, Syracuse, New York	Syracuse on Trial.

=== 1945 ===
Recipient	Area of Excellence
ABC Radio and George V. Denny, Jr.	America's Town Meeting of the Air, Outstanding Educational Program.
CBS Radio and Paul White	Outstanding Reporting of the News.
KFWB Radio, Hollywood, California	Marc Curry Working Towards Toward a Better World, Outstanding Regional Public Service.
KOMA Radio, Oklahoma City, Oklahoma	Save a Life, Outstanding Local Public Service.
KOWH Radio, Omaha, Nebraska	We March with Faith, Outstanding Children's Program.
Mutual Broadcasting System, Arch Oboler	for Outstanding Entertainment in Drama.
NBC Radio	The NBC Symphony of the Air, for Outstanding Entertainment in Music.
NBC Radio and Edgar Bergen	for Outstanding Entertainment in Drama.
WHAM Radio, Rochester, New York, and Dr. Howard Hanson, Eastman School of Music	Outstanding Entertainment in Music.
Honorable Mentions
KRNT Radio, Des Moines, Iowa	Outstanding Reporting of the News.
WHAS Radio, Louisville, Kentucky	Wake Up Kentucky.
WOV Radio and Arnold Hartley, New York, New York	Mr. Colombo Discovers America.

=== 1946 ===
Recipient	Area of Excellence
CBS Radio	The Columbia Workshop, Outstanding Entertainment in Radio.
CBS Radio and William L. Shirer	Outstanding Reporting and Interpretation of the News.
John Crosby	The New York Herald Tribune, a Personal Award for his radio criticism.
NBC Radio	Orchestras of the Nation.
WELL Radio, Battle Creek, Michigan	Our Town, Outstanding Public Service by a Local Station.
WHCU Radio, Ithaca, New York	The Radio Edition of The Weekly Press, Outstanding Public Service by a Local Station.
WMCA Radio, New York, New York	Outstanding Educational Program.
WOW Radio, Omaha, Nebraska	Operation Big Muddy, Outstanding Public Service by a Regional Station.
WSB Radio, Atlanta, Georgia	The Harbor We Seek, Outstanding Public Service by a Regional Station.
Honorable Mentions
CBS Radio	Invitation to Music (hosted by Bernard Herrmann).
CBS Radio	Suspense.
Junior League of America	Books Bring Adventure.
Henry Morgan, ABC Radio	Outstanding Entertainment in Drama, for The Henry Morgan Show.
Mutual Broadcasting System	Meet the Press.
Robert Saudek and ABC Radio	Outstanding Educational Program—Radio Adaptation of John Hersey's Hiroshima.

=== 1947 ===
Recipient	Area of Excellence
ABC Radio	Theatre Guild on the Air.
ABC Radio	The Boston Symphony Orchestra.
ABC Radio, Elmer Davis	Outstanding Reporting and Interpretation of the News.
CBS Radio	CBS Views the Press.
CBS Radio	CBS Is There.
KXAR Radio, Hope, Arkansas	Disaster Broadcast from Cotton Valley, Outstanding Public Service by a Local Station.
WBBM Radio, Chicago, Illinois	Report Uncensored, Outstanding Public Service by a Regional Station.
Honorable Mentions
CBS Radio	Studio One.
United National Network for Peace	United Nations Today.
WCCO Radio, Minneapolis, Minnesota	Outstanding Public Service by a Regional Station, As the Twig is Bent.
WQQW Radio, Washington, D.C.	The Children's Hour.

=== 1948 ===
Recipient	Area of Excellence
ABC Radio	You Bet Your Life.
ABC Radio	Communism, U.S. Brand.
ABC Television	Actors Studio.
CBS Radio	Larry LeSueur, Memo from Lake Success, Between the Dark and Daylight, U.N. in Action, Crusade for Children.
CBS Radio, Edward R. Murrow	Outstanding Reporting and Interpretation of the News.
KNBC Radio, San Francisco, California	Forests Aflame, Outstanding Public Service by a Regional Station.
NBC Radio	NBC University Theatre.
NBC Television	Howdy Doody.
NBC Radio, The Orchestras of the Nation	The First Piano Quartet, The Boston Symphony Rehearsals, Outstanding Entertainment in Music.
WDAR Radio, Savannah, Georgia	You and Youth, Outstanding Public Service by a Local Station.
Honorable Mentions
Lowell Institute Cooperative Broadcasting	Outstanding Education Program.
Radio Stations of the Mountain and Plain States	for Rendering Highly Important Service During the 1948 Blizzard.
Rocky Mountain Radio Council	Outstanding Education Program.
WNEW Radio, New York, New York	Little Songs About U.N.

=== 1949 ===
Recipient	Area of Excellence
ABC Radio	Author Meets the Critics.
ABC Television	Crusade in Europe.
Jack Benny, CBS Radio	a Personal Award.
CBS Radio, Eric Sevareid	Reporting and Interpretation of the News.
CBS Television	The Ed Wynn Show.
CBS Television	United Nations in Action.
KXLJ Radio, Helena, Montana	Legislative Highlights, Public Service by a Local Station.
NBC Radio	United Nations Project.
NBC Television	Kukla, Fran and Ollie.
WQXR Radio, New York, New York	Entertainment in Music, highlighting Our Musical Heritage, a series on longer classical works
WWJ Radio, Detroit, Michigan	Meet Your Congress, The Best Weapon, Protect Your Child, The World Forum, Public Service by a Regional Station.
Honorable Mentions
ABC Radio	The Greatest Story Ever Told.
ABC Radio and Erwin Canham	The Monitor Views the News.
Harold W. Ross, Editor, and The New Yorker	for Their Successful Campaign in Stopping Music and Commercial Announcements in Grand Central Station.
U.N. and American Broadcasters in General as Represented by the National Association of Broadcasters	for Broadcast Contributions to Better International Understanding.
H.T. Webster	Unseen Audience.
WMAZ Radio, Macon, Georgia	Reporting and Interpretation of the News.
WTIC Radio, Hartford, Connecticut	Mind Your Manners.
