= Seventh Victim =

1953 science fiction story by Robert Sheckley

- Short story by Robert Sheckley
- Country: United States
- Language: English
- Genre: Science fiction short story

Publication
- Published in: Galaxy
- Publication type: Periodical
- Media type: Magazine, radio play, movie
- Publication date: 1953

"Seventh Victim" is a science fiction short story by American writer Robert Sheckley, originally published in Galaxy Science Fiction in April 1953. In 1957 it was adapted for NBC's X Minus One radio play as "The Seventh Victim". It was heavily revised for the 1965 Italian movie The 10th Victim. Sheckley published a novelization of the film under that title the next year, and later followed with two sequels, 1987's Victim Prime and 1988's Hunter/Victim.

The story concerns a future society that has eliminated major warfare by allowing members of society who are inclined to violence to join The Big Hunt, a human hunting game. This eliminates the approximately one quarter of the population that would otherwise be a danger. The story follows an experienced hunter who is excited to receive his latest mission, but is faced with the concern that something is seriously wrong with the assignment.

== Plot ==
Stanton Frelaine is the co-owner of a Cleveland company that sells bulletproof vests to players in The Big Hunt, a government-run legalized murder game in which participants alternate between being a "hunter" and a "victim". A hunter attempts to track down and kill an assigned target, their victim. Frelaine is an experienced player, having already played through six rounds of the game. His older partner at the company, E.J. Morger, is a member of the rarefied "Tens Club", a status earned by winning ten rounds of the Hunt.

Frelaine receives his seventh assignment as hunter, with his victim being Janet-Marie Patzig of New York. He is somewhat surprised, having never heard of a woman playing the Hunt before. He calls the Emotional Catharsis Bureau to make sure. The Bureau was set up after the Fourth World War to run the Hunt to provide an outlet for aggression and prevent future wars. They confirm he has the right information.

Frelaine arrives in New York and goes for a walk to scout the victim's neighborhood. He is surprised when he quickly spots her sitting in the open at an outdoor cafe, smoking a cigarette. He once again contacts the Bureau to make sure she is aware she is playing victim. They assure him that everything is in order.

Frelaine feels cheated because he will not receive a full catharsis if the victim does not try to fight back. Seeking a thrill, he places himself in danger by approaching her. He pretends to be in town on business and looking for a date, but expects she will see through the deception and shoot him at any moment.

Patzig initially brushes off Frelaine's advances, saying she will probably be dead soon. She explains that she is in New York trying to become an actress, without much success. Looking for some excitement she signed up for the Hunt, but on her first mission she could not find the courage to kill her assigned victim. Now, taking her turn as victim, she is unable to contemplate shooting her hunter. So she is simply waiting to be killed.

Happy for his company, she and Frelaine spend the afternoon together. But Patzig cannot stop thinking about her impending murder and laments that she will soon be dead. Frelaine realizes he has fallen for her and admits to being her hunter, but says he would rather marry her than kill her. Greatly relieved, she kisses him and then lights a celebratory cigarette. She then shoots him with a gun concealed in her cigarette lighter.

As she aims for a killing shot, he hears her joyfully state that she can finally join the Tens Club.

== Reception ==
The inspiration for "Seventh Victim" is an earlier short story, "The Most Dangerous Game", by Richard Connell. Originally published in 1924, it inspired dozens of movies, radio and television episodes and other adaptations.

The story was the original inspiration for the live-action game Assassin, popular on American university campuses in the 1980s. According to the first coordinator at the University of Michigan, Lenny Pitt had played it at Roeper School and introduced it to the university in 1978. A biography supplied by Sheckley’s publishers says that The Tenth Victim, which was based on "Seventh Victim", "may" have been the basis of the game "Assassin".

== Comment by the author ==
Writing about the film adaptation, The 10th Victim, Sheckley wrote "Ultimately this story is about love, and how, even in so calculating a creature as Stanton Frelaine, it can blossom forth, an inextinguishable impulse, whether to fulfillment or death. The Hunt is an ironic futuristic equivalent to the creative act — something that is not reasonable or politic; something that is done for its own sake rather than for the outcome...These stories aren’t really about war, violence, or the future. 'The Seventh Victim' is a commentary on love, the need for excitement and the inevitability of self-deception...To claim that either story addresses the problem of violence is like saying that Swift's "A Modest Proposal” is about the eating habits of the Irish."

== Adaptations ==
"Seventh Victim" has been adapted for radio, stage and film.

NBC's radio series X Minus One was made in partnership with Galaxy Science Fiction. The adaptation "The Seventh Victim" was written by Ernest Kinoy, and remains relatively close to the original story. The only major change was to introduce the character Immanuel Gale of the Bureau, who introduces the backstory of the Hunt through a conversation with Frelaine while he packs for his trip to New York. The episode first aired on 6 March 1957. The episode can be found online.

The 1965 film The 10th Victim was much more heavily modified, switching roles between the hunter and victim. The hunter, played by Ursula Andress, is assigned her 10th victim but apparently fails to recognize him. The victim, played by Marcello Mastroianni, notices her, but is unsure whether she is really a hunter. The two become romantically involved, and it is revealed that she is actually trying to arrange the "perfect kill", having arranged sponsorship with a tea company.

== Sequels ==
Sheckley used ideas from The 10th Victim film as the basis for an expanded version of the original story, also titled The 10th Victim. Two sequels followed, Victim Prime in 1981, and Hunter/Victim in 1988. The former references The 10th Victim as an old movie.
