= Mars Is Heaven! =

1948 short story by Ray Bradbury

- Short story by Ray Bradbury
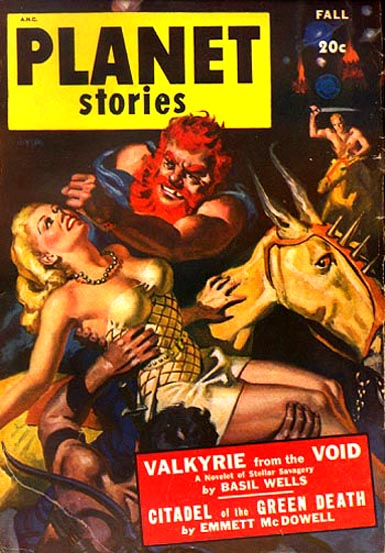
- Country: USA
- Language: English
- Genre: Science fiction

Publication
- Published in: Planet Stories
- Media type: Print (Magazine)
- Publication date: 1948

"Mars Is Heaven!" is a science fiction short story by American writer Ray Bradbury, originally published in 1948 in Planet Stories. "Mars Is Heaven!" was among the stories selected in 1970 by the Science Fiction Writers of America as one of the best science fiction short stories published before the creation of the Nebula Awards. As such, it was published in The Science Fiction Hall of Fame Volume One, 1929–1964. It also appears as the sixth chapter of The Martian Chronicles, revised as "The Third Expedition."

== Plot summary ==
It is 1960 and the third exploratory spaceship from Earth is landing on Mars. The crew is shocked to discover a small rural town, eerily similar to those most of the crew lived in during their own childhoods. The strangely familiar people in the town believe it is 1926. Crew members soon discover old friends and deceased relatives in the town. Those who had been ordered to stay behind and guard the rocket abandon their posts in order to join the reunions and festivities.

Members of the crew split up to spend the night in the homes of their lost comrades and relatives. The ship's captain remains skeptical, and realizes in the middle of the night that the entire situation may have been contrived by telepathic aliens to lower the Earthmen's guards. Before he can warn the others or reestablish a guard on the spaceship, he is proved right as he and the rest of the crew are killed by aliens masquerading as their family members.

== Adaptations in other media ==
"Mars Is Heaven!" was adapted as a radio drama for numerous anthology series including Escape (June 2, 1950), Dimension X (July 7, 1950 & January 7, 1951), Think (1953), X Minus One (May 8, 1955), and Future Tense (July 1976). It was also adapted to the EC comic book Weird Science #18 (March–April 1953) by Al Feldstein and Wally Wood. It was also adapted as an episode of The Ray Bradbury Theater (July 20, 1990) starring Hal Linden and Paul Gross. It was also translated into Bengali as Mongoli Shawrgo by Satyajit Ray, a friend of Bradbury's, with permission from the author. This version can be found in the book Braziler Kalo Bagh O Onanyo (The Brazilian Cat & Others). It was also dramatized as the Second Expedition to Mars in the 1980 TV miniseries adaptation of Bradbury's science fiction anthology "The Martian Chronicles."

== Reception ==
Algis Budrys said that the story was "Beautifully written, poetically effective, excellently designed", but "There is no fulfillment here ... this stuff simply evokes the empty stuff of nightmares".
