= Victim Prime =

1987 novel by Robert Sheckley

- Author: Robert Sheckley
- Language: English
- Genre: Science fiction
- Set in: 2092
- Publisher: Tor Books
- Publication date: 1987
- Publication place: United States
- Media type: Print (Paperback)
- Preceded by: Seventh Victim
- Followed by: Hunter/Victim

Victim Prime is a science fiction novel by American writer Robert Sheckley, published in 1987. It is the sequel to 1953's "Seventh Victim" and is followed by 1988's Hunter/Victim.

== Plot summary ==
The novel is set in a dystopian 2092. It describes an iteration of the Big Hunt, the government-ruled assassination program introduced in the short story "Seventh Victim", this time played in a resort.

== Reception ==
David Langford reviewed Victim Prime for White Dwarf #87, and stated that "It moves well enough, but despite ingenious ploys and counterploys has a touch of staleness: Sheckley imitating Sheckley."

== Reviews ==
- Review by Brian Stableford (1987) in Fantasy Review, April 1987
- Review by John Newsinger (1987) in Paperback Inferno, #68
- Review by Tom Easton (1987) in Analog Science Fiction/Science Fact, November 1987
- Review by Edward Bryant (1987) in Rod Serling's The Twilight Zone Magazine, December 1987
- Review by Lee Montgomerie (1987) in Interzone, #21 Autumn 1987
- Review by Mike Christie (1987) in Foundation, #39 Spring 1987
- Review [French] by Thierry Bosch (1988) in Fiction, #401
- Review [French] by Jonathan Dornet (1989) in A&A, #117
- Review [Polish] by Wojciech M. Chudziński (2000) in Świat Gier Komputerowych, #92
