= Jean Kenyon Mackenzie =

American missionary

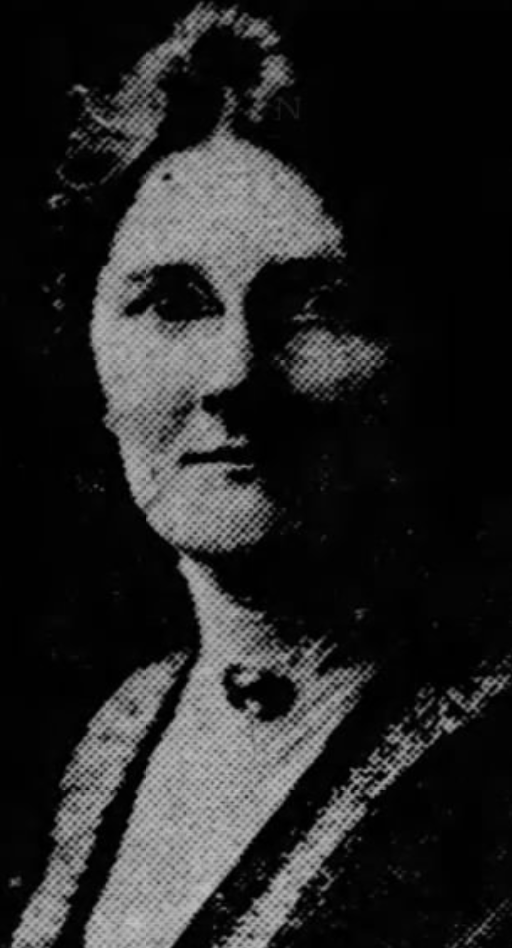
- Jean Kenyon Mackenzie, from a 1918 newspaper.
- Born: January 6, 1874; Elgin, Illinois
- Died: September 2, 1936 (aged 62); New York City
- Other name: Jean K. Mackenzie
- Occupations: Writer, Presbyterian missionary

Jean Kenyon Mackenzie (January 6, 1874 – September 2, 1936) was an American writer and Presbyterian missionary in West Africa.

== Early life ==
Jean Kenyon Mackenzie was born in Elgin, Illinois, the daughter of Robert Mackenzie and Lydia Ann McLeod Mackenzie. Her father was born in Scotland and was a Presbyterian clergyman. She went to school at Van Ness Seminary in San Francisco, the Sorbonne, and the University of California at Berkeley, graduating from the last in 1896. She was on the editorial staff on the college newspaper, The Occident, and wrote poems published there. She also earned a graduate degree at Smith College.

== Career ==
Mackenzie was a missionary teacher in West Africa from 1904 to 1914, under the auspices of the Board of Foreign Missions of the Presbyterian Church (USA). She was based in Lolodorf and Efoulan in German-occupied Kamerun, and at Baraka Station in French-occupied Gabon. She retired from the mission field for health reasons in 1914, but returned to Cameroon during World War I, as a diplomat working with missionaries, the Bulu people, and the French government.

Mackenzie wrote short stories, poems, and articles, published in American periodicals including the Atlantic Monthly Overland Monthly, and The Perry Magazine. After her missionary years, she also wrote books, many of them intended for young readers or church study groups, including Black Sheep: Adventures in West Africa (1916), An African Trail (1917), African Adventurers (1917), The Story of a Fortunate Youth (1920), African Lanterns (1920), African Clearings (1924), The Black Pioneer (1924; she wrote the introduction), The Venture (1925, a collection of poems), A Lucky Lad (1926), Friends of Africa (1928), and The Trader's Wife (1930, a novel).

In 1923, Mackenzie was appointed to the Board of Foreign Missions, and represented the board at a mission conference in Belgium. She was also a popular lecturer to church and women's groups.

== Personal life ==
Mackenzie died in 1936, aged 62 years, at her sister's home in New York City. Her papers are in the collection of the Presbyterian Historical Society. A short biography of Mackenzie appeared as a daily devotional in A Year with American Saints (2006).
