= America Calling =

- Genre: Variety
- Country of origin: United States
- Language: English
- Hosted by: Jack Benny; Bob Hope
- Starring: Shirley Temple; Charles Laughton; Groucho Marx; Clark Gable; Merle Oberon; Myrna Loy
- Written by: Dore Schary; Ed Beloin
- Directed by: Dick Mack
- Produced by: Bill Morrow
- No. of episodes: 1
- Sponsored by: Greek War Relief

America Calling, sponsored by the Greek War Relief, was broadcast February 8, 1941, on CBS, NBC, independent stations and all of Europe.

Jack Benny and Bob Hope were the "co-masters of ceremonies" for a show that featured The Merry Macs; Shirley Temple, Charles Laughton, Groucho Marx and Madeleine Carroll in a comedy skit written by Dick Mack (who directed the show); Clark Gable and Merle Oberon in a "modern romance" by Robert Riley Crutcher; Frank Morgan singing an "updated" Mikado, introduced by Reginald Owen; a visit to the home of the Hardy Family (Mickey Rooney & Lewis Stone); Benny, Hope and Groucho Marx singing a trio; Ronald Colman inspiringly dramatized "The Jervis Bay Goes Down," a poem by Gene Fowler; and Hope and Benny in a sketch about dating with Mary Martin and Myrna Loy. When introducing Laughton, Benny intentionally mispronounced the great actor's name as 'Laffton". That was followed by humorous dialog after which Laughton recited an eloquent telegram forwarded by Sam Goldwyn from Prime Minister of Greece Alexandros Koryzis. Koryzis committed suicide on April 18, as German troops approach Athens.

Also on the program were Ann Rutherford, Barbara Stanwyck, Carey Wilson, Connee Boswell, Dick Powell, Fay Holden, Max Terr's Choral Group, and Melvyn Douglas.

Dore Schary supervised the show and scripted with Ed Beloin. Bill Morrow was the producer.
