= Dimension X (radio program) =

1950s NBC series

- This advertisement for Dimension X promotes an adaptation of a Frank M. Robinson story from Astounding Science Fiction (September 1951) about a politician who purchases an elixir of life and then hires a detective to investigate the seller. The drawing is signed "J.M."
- Genre: Science fiction
- Country of origin: US
- Language: English
- Home station: NBC Radio Network
- Announcer: Norman Rose
- Directed by: Edward King, Fred Weihe
- Produced by: Van Woodward, William Welch
- Original release: 8 April 1950 – 29 September 1951
- No. of episodes: 50

Dimension X was an NBC radio program broadcast mostly on an unsponsored, sustaining basis from April 8, 1950, to September 29, 1951. The first 13 episodes were broadcast live, and the remainder were prerecorded. Fred Wiehe and Edward King were the directors, and Norman Rose was heard as both announcer and narrator, opening the show with: "Adventures in time and space... told [or transcribed] in future tense..." For two months, beginning on July 7, 1950, the series was sponsored by Wheaties.

== Overview ==
Preceded by Mutual's 2000 Plus (1950–52), Dimension X was not the first adult science fiction series on radio, but the acquisition of previously published stories immediately gave it a strong standing with the science fiction community, as did the choice of established writers within the genre: Isaac Asimov, Robert Bloch, Ray Bradbury, Fredric Brown, Robert A. Heinlein, Murray Leinster, H. Beam Piper, Frank M. Robinson, Clifford D. Simak, William Tenn, Jack Vance, Kurt Vonnegut, Jack Williamson and Donald A. Wollheim. Ernest Kinoy and George Lefferts adapted most of the stories and also provided original scripts.

In Science Fiction Television (2004), M. Keith Booker wrote:

It was not until the 1950s that science fiction radio really hit its stride, even as science fiction was beginning to appear on television as well. Radio programs such as Mutual's 2000 Plus and NBC's Dimension X were anthology series that offered a variety of exciting tales of future technology, with a special focus on space exploration (including alien invasion), though both series also often reflected contemporary anxieties about the dangers of technology.

The series opened with "The Outer Limit," Ernest Kinoy's adaptation of Graham Doar's short story from The Saturday Evening Post (December 24, 1949) about alien contact. A week later (April 15, 1950), the program presented Jack Williamson's most famous story, "With Folded Hands," first published in the July 1947 issue of Astounding Science Fiction.

With a five-month hiatus from January 1951 to June 1951, the series spanned 17 months. All 50 episodes of the series survived and can be heard today. Later, NBC's X Minus One (1955–58) utilized many of the same actors and scripts.

== See also ==
- List of Dimension X episodes

== Listen to ==
- OTRRG certified Dimension X complete series (singles/zipped sets)
- Dimension X in the Internet Archive's Old-Time Radio Collection
- Listen to Space Travel related episodes of Dimension X at Spacemens Luck
