= X Minus One =

American science fiction radio drama series

- Cover of Dell paperback (1951) of original Heinlein's story "Universe".
- Genre: Science fiction
- Country of origin: US
- Language: English
- Home station: NBC
- Announcer: Fred Collins
- Directed by: Fred Weihe, Daniel Sutter, George Voutsas
- Produced by: William Welch
- Original release: April 24, 1955 – January 9, 1958
- No. of episodes: 126

X Minus One is an American half-hour science fiction radio drama series that was broadcast from April 24, 1955, to January 9, 1958, in various timeslots on NBC. Known for high production values in adapting stories from the leading American authors of the era, X Minus One has been described as one of the finest offerings of American radio drama and one of the best science fiction series in any medium.

== Overview ==
X Minus One was originally a revival of NBC's Dimension X (1950–51), with the first 15 episodes of X Minus One being new performances of scripts from the older series. Starting with episode 16, the series featured newly-produced episodes by NBC staff writers, mainly Ernest Kinoy and George Lefferts. X Minus One featured adaptations of works by leading American writers in the field, including Isaac Asimov, Ray Bradbury, Philip K. Dick, Robert A. Heinlein, Theodore Sturgeon, Murray Leinster, Frederik Pohl, along with some original scripts by Kinoy and Lefferts.

Included in the series were adaptations of Robert Sheckley's "Skulking Permit", Bradbury's "Mars Is Heaven", Heinlein's "Universe" and "The Green Hills of Earth", Pohl's "The Tunnel under the World", J. T. McIntosh’s "Hallucination Orbit", Fritz Leiber’s "A Pail of Air", and George Lefferts' "The Parade".

The program opened with announcer Fred Collins delivering the countdown, leading into the following introduction (although later shows beginning with Episode 37, were partnered with Galaxy Science Fiction rather than Astounding Science Fiction):

Countdown for blastoff... X minus five, four, three, two, X minus one... Fire! [Rocket launch SFX] From the far horizons of the unknown come transcribed tales of new dimensions in time and space. These are stories of the future; adventures in which you'll live in a million could-be years on a thousand may-be worlds. The National Broadcasting Company, in cooperation with Street & Smith, publishers of Astounding Science Fiction presents... X Minus One.

The series was canceled after the 126th broadcast on January 9, 1958. However, the early 1970s brought a wave of nostalgia for old-time radio. A new experimental episode, "The Iron Chancellor" by Robert Silverberg, was produced in 1973, but it failed to revive the series. NBC also tried broadcasting the old recordings, but their irregular once-monthly failed to find an audience.

In 1974, college radio station WMUK in Kalamazoo, Michigan recorded new adaptations of old X Minus One scripts under the title Future Tense. There were minor changes to some of the scripts, such as updating the setting from the 1950s to the ‘70s or moving the setting to Michigan.

The series was re-released in podcast form beginning on June 22, 2007.

In November 2008, Counter-Productions Theatre Company in Rhode, Island, United States adapted three X Minus One episodes to the stage: "The Parade", "A Logic Named Joe", and "Hallucination Orbit". The theatrical troupe did annual adaptations of X Minus One until 2016.

== Episodes based on stories by famous writers ==
- Poul Anderson – "The Light"
- Isaac Asimov – "Nightfall", "C-Chute", "Hostess"
- James Blish – "Surface Tension"
- Robert Bloch – "Almost Human"
- Ray Bradbury – "And The Moon Be Still As Bright", "Mars is Heaven!", "The Veldt", "Dwellers in Silence", "Zero Hour", "To the Future", "Marionettes, Inc.", "There Will Come Soft Rains"
- L. Sprague de Camp – "A Gun for Dinosaur"
- Mark Clifton – "Star, Bright"
- Philip K. Dick – "The Defenders", "Colony"
- Thomas Godwin – "The Cold Equations"
- Robert A. Heinlein – "Universe", "The Green Hills of Earth", "Requiem", "The Roads Must Roll"
- Fritz Leiber – "A Pail of Air", "Appointment in Tomorrow", "The Moon is Green"
- Frederik Pohl – "The Haunted Corpse", "Tunnel under the World", "Target One", "The Map Makers"
- Robert Sheckley – "Skulking Permit", "The Lifeboat Mutiney", "Protection", "Early Model", "The Seventh Victim", "Something for Nothing", "The Native Problem", "Bad Medicine"
- Robert Silverberg – "Double Dare", "The Iron Chancellor"
- Clifford D. Simak – "Courtesy", "Junkyard", "How-2", "Project Mastodon", "Drop Dead", "Lulu"
- Theodore Sturgeon – "Mr. Costello, Hero", "Saucer of Loneliness", "The Stars are the Styx"
- William Tenn – "Venus is for Men"

== See also ==
- 2000 Plus, (Mutual) The first adult science fiction series on U.S. radio.
- Dimension X, (NBC) The predecessor to X Minus One with 15 of the same stories.
- Exploring Tomorrow, (Mutual) A 1957–1958 series narrated by John W. Campbell
- Golden Age of Radio
- Tales of Tomorrow, (ABC) A short lived 1953 radio anthology with only 15 episodes, 4 stories of which were also made into X Minus One episodes.
