= George Lefferts =

American writer, producer and playwright (1921–2018)

George Lefferts (born George Leffertz; June 18, 1921 – April 18, 2018) was an American writer, producer, playwright, poet, and director of television dramas, motion pictures, radio dramas, and socially conscious documentaries. His original plays and films for television won Emmy Awards three times and Golden Globes twice.

== Biography and work ==
George Leffertz was born in Paterson, New Jersey on June 18, 1921. He was raised in Paterson and graduated from Eastside High School, where he worked on the school paper. During World War II, he served in the United States Army Intelligence and Medical Corps, enlisting at the age of 20. He was a glider pilot and deep water sailor.

Lefferts worked as a columnist for The New York Observer and was twice winner of First Place, the New England Press Association Award for Best Weekly Newspaper Column in America (1983 and 1984).

Lefferts was executive producer and writer of the Smithsonian Institution Specials for David Wolper Productions, executive producer for Time-Life, NBC, ABC and CBS, and a frequent writer of original scripts and short stories for the science fiction radio programs Dimension X and X Minus One. He wrote and produced the anti-ageist film The Living End, of which Variety wrote "the writing by George Lefferts was so pure it was well nigh perfect." With Alfred Hitchcock and William Shatner he created and wrote Tactic the first television program to openly deal with cancer. He also created, produced and wrote Special for Women, a groundbreaking series for Women's Liberation featuring anthropologist Margaret Mead; the program won the Emmy Award (1967) and the Golden Globe Award (1968).

His original play The Loneliness of the Armadillo was presented by the Banyan Theater in Sarasota, Florida and two new plays The Boat and The Party Store were presented at the HBO Theater in New York in 2013.

Lefferts completed the script and lyrics of a full-scale opera The Amadou Cantata, based on the infamous Amadou Diallo trial of four NYPD officers.

Lefferts also created and wrote the comedy series Rocky Fortune starring Frank Sinatra, and the NBC documentary Bravo, Picasso! featuring Pablo Picasso, Yves Montand, and Jacqueline Kennedy.

Lefferts was producer of the Emmy-winning daytime series, Ryan's Hope during its early weeks, and executive producer and writer of the ABC medical drama, Breaking Point which aired during the 1963–1964 television season. Episodes were directed by Sydney Pollack and featured Robert Redford, John Cassavetes, Hume Cronyn, Jessica Tandy and Lillian Gish.

Lefferts was co-creator and writer of Family Album, U.S.A., "a soap opera designed to teach English as a Second Language", distributed by Macmillan Publishers in 58 countries.

Lefferts taught screenwriting at Johns Hopkins and Rutgers Universities. He was a member of the American Medical Writers Association. As a writer and producer for The Network for Continuing Medical Education, he was credited for many "cutting-edge medical films," including Doctor Barnhard's Heart Transplant [NBC], Pain–Where It Hurts Most [NBC], What Price Health, with Senator Ted Kennedy [NBC], and Acupuncture Anesthesia in Red China [NBC].

George Lefferts died in Leonia, New Jersey on April 18, 2018, at the age of 96.
