= Ernest Kinoy =

American screenwriter (1925–2014)

- Born: April 1, 1925; New York City, US
- Died: November 10, 2014 (aged 89); Townshend, Vermont, US
- Education: Columbia University
- Occupation: Writer
- Spouse: Barbara Powers
- Children: 2
- Relatives: Arthur Kinoy (brother)
- Writing career
- Notable awards: Two Emmy Awards

Ernest Kinoy (April 1, 1925 – November 10, 2014) was an American writer, screenwriter and playwright. He was known as a staff writer for the National Broadcasting Corporation (NBC) where he wrote scripts for many television and radio shows.

== Early life ==
Kinoy was born in New York City on April 1, 1925; his parents, Albert and Sarah Kinoy (formerly Forstadt), were both high-school teachers. His older brother Arthur Kinoy later became a leading constitutional lawyer. Kinoy attended the Ethical Culture Fieldston School and later Columbia University, although his studies were interrupted by military service during World War II. During his army service with the 106th Infantry Division, Kinoy was made a prisoner of war, and was interned at the Stalag IX-B camp but, as a Jewish POW, was subsequently sent to the slave labor camp at Berga.

Following his return from the war, while still attending Columbia College, Kinoy's submission to The Carrington Playhouse—Elaine Carrington's dramatic anthology series showcasing the work of new writers—was accepted, ultimately becoming the series' final episode. A radio satire entitled "Shakespeare Comes to the Carrington Playhouse", the episode aired on September 26, 1946, featuring cameo appearances by, among others, Carrington, director Perry Lafferty, ubiquitous MBS producer Herb Rice, and Procter & Gamble vice president Bill Ramsey as the titular Bard.

After graduating from Columbia in 1947, Kinoy joined NBC the following year as a staff writer.

== Radio, television and screen career ==
=== NBC years (1948–1960) ===
During his time at NBC, Kinoy wrote scripts for many of the major NBC radio and television dramas of the 1950s, including the television anthology series Studio One and Playhouse 90. His television play Walk Down the Hill, based on his experiences as a prisoner of war, aired in 1957 as an episode of Studio One. He wrote the script for the short-lived series The Marriage, which was an adaptation of a previous Kinoy-scripted radio show of the same name. The series, although well-received, was cancelled when the stars Hume Cronyn and Jessica Tandy chose to pursue their stage careers. He was also a writer for The Imogene Coca Show, which ran for one season following the conclusion of her run on Your Show of Shows in 1954.

Kinoy was a contributor of original stories, such as "The Martian Death March", to the science fiction radio series Dimension X and X Minus One, as well as adapting stories by writers such as Ray Bradbury, Isaac Asimov and Philip K. Dick for the two series. Along with George Lefferts, Kinoy was a primary scriptwriter for the radio program Rocky Fortune, which starred Frank Sinatra and ran weekly on NBC from October 1953 through March 1954. He contributed both original stories and adaptations, including an adaptation of Shirley Jackson's The Lottery, to the anthology program NBC Presents: Short Story. As an NBC staff writer, he also wrote scripts for many of the station's programmes, including Radio City Playhouse, The Eternal Light, The Big Story and NBC University Theatre.

=== 1960s television work ===
Following his departure from NBC in 1960, Kinoy wrote scripts for episodes of popular television series including The Defenders, Naked City, Route 66, Dr. Kildare and Shane.

His script for the "Blacklist" episode of The Defenders, which guest-starred Jack Klugman as an actor unable to work in his profession due to being on the Hollywood blacklist, won Kinoy his first Emmy Award in the Outstanding Writing Achievement in Drama - Original category in 1964.

Kinoy wrote the television adaptations for the musical Brigadoon, a 1966 ABC production, and for NBC's Pinocchio, which aired in 1968.

He served as President of the Writers Guild of America, East from 1969 to 1971.

=== 1970s ===
Kinoy wrote the screenplays for two films starring Sidney Poitier: Brother John which was released in 1971 and the 1972 western film Buck and the Preacher, starring Poitier and Harry Belafonte. Leadbelly, based on the life of the blues musician Lead Belly and written by Kinoy was released in 1976.

The 1976 Kinoy-scripted television movie Victory at Entebbe, made soon after the hostage-rescue operation at Entebbe Airport was nominated for four Emmys, including a nomination for Kinoy.

Kinoy, along with William Blinn, won an Emmy in 1977 for their script for the second episode of the miniseries Roots. Kinoy received another Emmy nomination as the head writer of the sequel to the series, Roots: The Next Generations, in 1979.

=== 1980s ===
The 1981 television movie Skokie, a drama based on the real life NSPA controversy in Skokie, Illinois, won Kinoy a Writers Guild of America Award, as well as a fifth Emmy nomination in the category Outstanding Writing in a Limited Series or Special. He wrote the script for the 1986 HBO movie Murrow, based on the life of Edward R. Murrow, and the teleplay for the television adaptation of the Gore Vidal novel Lincoln.

=== 1990s ===
Kinoy adapted the screenplay for the 1991 TV movie Chernobyl: The Final Warning from a book by Robert Peter Gale and Thomas Hauser. Airing on TNT, the film starred Jon Voight and Jason Robards. He also wrote an episode of Diagnosis: Murder.

== Plays and musicals ==
Kinoy wrote the "book" (story and spoken dialogue) for the musicals Golden Rainbow, Bajour and Chaplin.

In 1962, Kinoy wrote the play Something About a Soldier, which was based on the 1957 novel by Mark Harris. Starring Ken Kercheval, Tony Roberts and Sal Mineo, the play had a short run at the Ambassador Theatre on Broadway in January of that year.

== Personal life ==
In 1948, Kinoy married to Barbara Powers, a doctor of psychotherapy, psychiatric social worker and an authority on the treatment of eating disorders. They had two children and remained married until her 2007 death. On November 10, 2014, Kinoy died of pneumonia at the age of 89.
