= Helga Feddersen =

German actress (1930–1990)

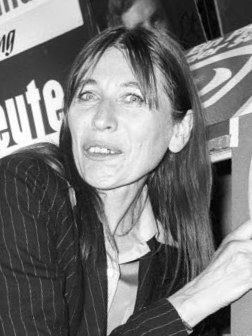
- Feddersen in 1976
- Born: 14 March 1930; Hamburg, Germany
- Died: 24 November 1990 (aged 60); Hamburg, Germany
- Occupation: Actress
- Years active: 1960s, 1970s

Helga Feddersen (German: [ˈhɛl.ɡa ˈfɛ.dɐ.sn̩]; 14 March 1930 – 24 November 1990) was a German actress, comedian, singer, author, and theater director.

== Biography ==
Feddersen was born and died in Hamburg. She took up acting early in her life, first being cast for minor parts such as maids, cooks and cleaning ladies. After her first successes she moved up major rôles such as naive heroines, young mothers and young ladies of noble heritage.

After a cancer operation in 1955, which resulted in a slight disfiguration of her face, directors shied back from casting her as romantic heroine. Shrewdly recognizing the hint given to her by the fates, she decided to change genres, now appearing most successfully in comedies. Being of Northern German origin with a strong but likeable Northern German accent, Feddersen was mostly cast for productions set in Northern Germany. She often played women of slightly naive but gentle and likeable characters.

Despite her success in comedies, Feddersen still remained popular as a serious actress. Among her most notable appearances on the silver screen was the part of Klothilde in the 1959 cinema adaptation of Thomas Mann's classic novel Buddenbrooks.

In 1963, Feddersen played a small part as a witness in Das Haus an der Stör (The house near river Stör) an episode of Stahlnetz, the German adaptation of the US-format Dragnet. This particular episode became the most successful of the whole series and remains to this day as the episode which saw the most re-runs.

In the late 1960s, Feddersen discovered her writing talent, and over the next fifteen years she wrote the scripts for several successful made-for-TV movies and mini series, most of them portraying the hard but hopeful lives of sailors, shipyard workers, fisher men and their families in the port of Hamburg and along the river Elbe as well as the German North Sea Coast.

In 1971, Feddersen - who was also a highly acclaimed stage actress - was invited to Hamburg's famous Ohnsorg-Theater. The Ohnsorg Theater remains to this day as the most popular theater in Germany, and each of its productions (usually 4 to 6 per year) is videotaped for a subsequent TV airing after the end of a play's scheduled run. Feddersen's 1971 guest appearance at the Ohnsorg Theater as the nosy, fussy middle-aged spinster Bertha Bliesemann in the play Der möblierte Herr (loosely translated The Gentleman lodger) resulted in one of the most popular broadcasts ever from the Ohnsorg Theater. Der möblierte Herr is regularly re-run on German TV.

In 1975, Feddersen was cast for the part of Else Tetzlaff in the series Ein Herz und eine Seele, the German adaptation of the British sitcom Till Death Us Do Part, which was known in the U. S. as All in the Family. She took over the part from Elisabeth Wiedemann, who had declined to sign a contract for a new season. The part of Else's son-in-law, Michael, was also recast. The cast changes, though, were immensely unpopular with the German audience, so the series was discontinued. The failing of Ein Herz und eine Seele was Feddersen's first serious flop in her career.

Aside from being an actress, Feddersen loved to appear as a comedian. During the late 1970s, she hosted several comedy shows and enjoyed a smash hit in 1978, when she teamed up with Dieter "Didi" Hallervorden for the duet Du, die Wanne ist voll (The bathtub's full), a chart topping spoof cover version of You're the One That I Want from the movie Grease. In 1981, Feddersen enjoyed a solo # 1 on the German charts with Gib mir bitte einen Kuss (Please, give me just one kiss), a spoof vocal version of the Chicken Dance.

In the 1980s, Feddersen mostly worked as a writer. Her book Hallo, hier ist Helga (Hello, this is Helga) became an instant best seller.

In 1983 a dream came true for her when she opened her very own theater in Hamburg. Her self-written play Die Perle Anna (Anna, the pearl) about a witty and good hearted house maid was a box office hit and ran for several years.

In 1989, Feddersen was diagnosed with cancer for the second time in her life. Although she had to give up her beloved theater, her will to live helped her to overcome cancer. In 1990, she worked as an actress again. Her guest appearance as a courageous policeman's widow in the long-running series Großstadtrevier (famous for its authentical portrayal of policemen's work and private lives), though, became the last role she ever played. Shortly after the filming of the show's episode was completed, Feddersen was diagnosed with cancer again. Shortly before her death on 24 November 1990, she married Olli Maier, who had been her life partner for more than ten years.

Helga Feddersen was buried in Stuttgart by request of Olli Maier, because it was his birth city. Maier was severely rebuked for this decision by the mayor and the people of Hamburg, because Helga Feddersen had always declared that Hamburg was her true home.

== Selected filmography ==
Actress

- Professor Nachtfalter (1951)
- The Buddenbrooks (1959), as Clothilde Buddenbrook
- Girl from Hong Kong (1961)
- The Green Archer (1961)
- Stahlnetz: Das Haus an der Stör (1963, TV), as Hildegard Fette
- Stahlnetz: Strandkorb 421 (1964, TV), as Hotel Chambermaid
- The Priest of St. Pauli (1970), as Tine Poppenbüll
- Der möblierte Herr (1971, TV film), as Berta Bliesemann
- Revenge of the East Frisians (1974), as Frau Brünitz
- Tadellöser & Wolff (1975, TV miniseries), as Anna Kröger
- Ein Herz und eine Seele (1976, TV series), as Else Tetzlaff
- Uncle Bräsig (1978, TV series), as Frau Pomuchelskopp
- Lola (1981), as Miss Hettich
- Sunshine Reggae in Ibiza (1983), as Suleika

Screenwriter

- Vier Stunden von Elbe 1 (1968, TV film)
- Gezeiten (1970, TV film)
- Sparks in Neu-Grönland (1971, TV film)
- Im Fahrwasser (1971, TV film)
- Bismarck von hinten oder Wir schließen nie (1974, TV film)
- Kümo Henriette (1979–1982, TV series)
