= The Wedding Trip =

The Wedding Trip may refer to:

- The Wedding Trip (1969 film), a German-Italian comedy film
- The Wedding Trip (1939 film), a German historical drama film
- The Wedding Trip (1936 film), a Swedish comedy film
- The Wedding Trip, a 1911 operetta by Reginald De Koven
