= Eberhard Prüter =

German actor (1945–2014)

- Born: 21 January 1945; Mägdesprung, Greater German Reich
- Died: 28 October 2014 (aged 69); Berlin, Germany
- Occupation: Actor
- Years active: 1974–2014

Eberhard Prüter (21 January 1945 – 28 October 2014) was a German actor who specialized in films, television and dubbing.

== Biography ==
Prüter became known as a live action performer and voice actor on GDR television in the 1970s to 1980s. He then emigrated to West Berlin to pursue his career. As an actor, he appeared in films like Didi – Der Experte and series like Didi's Comedy Show, both starring Dieter Hallervorden.

As a voice actor, Prüter was best known for the voice of Squidward Tentacles in the German dub of SpongeBob SquarePants. He was also the German voice of James in Tabaluga, Count Falko von Falkenstein in Bibi and Tina, Zazu in The Lion King and replaced the late Friedrich W. Bauschulte as the voice of Ludwig von Drake.

Prüter died on 28 October 2014 in Berlin, aged 69.

== Voice roles (selection) ==
Corey Burton

- 1999–2000: Mickey Mouse Works (Ludwig von Drake)
- 2001–2003: House of Mouse (Ludwig von Drake)
- 2001: Mickey's Magical Christmas: Snowed In at the House of Mouse (Ludwig von Drake)
- 2003–2005: Star Wars: Clone Wars (San Hill)
- 2006–2014: Mickey Mouse Clubhouse (Ludwig von Drake)

Richard Schiff

- 1997: The Lost World: Jurassic Park (Eddie Carr)
- 1998: Living Out Loud (Phil Francato)
- 2000: Whatever It Takes (P.E. Teacher)

Michael Berryman

- 1984: Voyage of the Rock Aliens (Chainsaw)
- 1987: The Barbarians (Dirtmaster)

Dean Stockwell

- 1995: Deadline for Murder: From the Files of Edna Buchanan (Aaron Bliss)
- 1997: McHale's Navy (Capt. Wallace B. Binghampton)

Edward Hibbert

- 1998: The Lion King II: Simba's Pride (Zazu)
- 2004: The Lion King 1½ (Zazu)

Rodger Bumpass

- 1999–2013: SpongeBob SquarePants (Squidward Tentacles)
- 2004: The SpongeBob SquarePants Movie (Squidward Tentacles)

Tom Kenny

- 2010: Kung-Fu Magoo (Dr. Malicio)
