= The Running Man (1987 film) =

American film by Paul Michael Glaser

- Theatrical release poster
- Directed by: Paul Michael Glaser (Note: Andrew Davis initially served as director but left during production due to being behind schedule and was replaced by Glaser.)
- Screenplay by: Steven E. de Souza
- Based on: The Running Man by Richard Bachman
- Produced by: Tim Zinnemann; George Linder
- Starring: Arnold Schwarzenegger; María Conchita Alonso; Yaphet Kotto; Richard Dawson
- Cinematography: Thomas Del Ruth
- Edited by: John Wright; Mark Warner; Edward A. Warschilka
- Music by: Harold Faltermeyer
- Production companies: Taft Entertainment Pictures; Keith Barish Productions; Home Box Office
- Distributed by: Tri-Star Pictures
- Release date: November 13, 1987
- Running time: 101 minutes
- Country: United States
- Language: English
- Budget: $27 million
- Box office: $38.1 million (United States)

The Running Man is a 1987 American science fiction action film directed by Paul Michael Glaser from a screenplay by Steven E. de Souza. It is loosely based on the 1982 novel The Running Man by Stephen King (under his pseudonym Richard Bachman). Starring Arnold Schwarzenegger, María Conchita Alonso, Richard Dawson, Yaphet Kotto, and Jesse Ventura, the film is set in a dystopic and totalitarian future United States, where a state-controlled broadcaster airs a deadly game show in which convicted criminals, known as "runners", must survive pursuit by themed gladiatorial assassins called "stalkers". The story follows Captain Ben Richards (Schwarzenegger), a framed police officer forced to compete on the show, who becomes an unlikely symbol of resistance against a corrupt government and its manipulative media machine.

The film's development was marked by substantial creative turnover. Originally slated to be directed by George P. Cosmatos with Christopher Reeve in the lead role, the project underwent major changes when both were replaced during pre-production. Principal photography began in September 1986, with Andrew Davis briefly directing the early weeks of filming before being dismissed, after which Glaser was hired; Schwarzenegger later criticized this decision, arguing that Glaser approached the material too much like television and diminished its thematic potential. Multiple drafts of the script were written, shifting the tone from a dark, socially conscious allegory to a more humorous, action-oriented spectacle tailored to Schwarzenegger's star persona. The production featured extensive set pieces, stunt work, and dance sequences, including choreography by Paula Abdul, all designed to enhance the film's television-inspired aesthetic.

The Running Man was released in the USA and Canada by Tri-Star Pictures on November 13, 1987, grossing $38.1 million against a $27 million budget. The film received mixed reviews from critics, who praised Richard Dawson's villainous turn and the film's satirical jabs at American media culture, but criticized its repetitive action structure and inconsistent tone. Over time, the film has undergone a degree of critical reassessment, with commentators noting its surprising prescience regarding reality TV, economic inequality, and the political weaponization of media imagery. A second adaptation, also titled The Running Man, was released in November 2025.

== Plot ==
In 2017, following a worldwide economic collapse and resource scarcity, the USA has become a totalitarian police state. The government maintains control through propaganda and censorship of unsanctioned art, music, and communication. The state-controlled broadcaster ICS runs the nation's most popular program, "The Running Man," a game show in which prisoners can earn their freedom by surviving as "runners" against lethal "stalkers".

Captain Ben Richards is arrested after refusing orders to open fire on an unarmed food riot in Bakersfield. His fellow officers massacre the rioters and frame Richards for the incident, branding him the "Butcher of Bakersfield". Eighteen months later, Richards escapes from a prison labor camp with resistance fighters Harold Weiss and William Laughlin. They ask him to join their cause, but Richards declines, focused only on surviving.

Richards travels to his brother's former apartment but discovers that ICS composer Amber Mendez now lives there after his brother was taken for "re-education". Richards forces Amber to help him bypass airport security, but thinking he is the "Butcher", she alerts the authorities. After his capture, Amber sees news reports falsely claiming that Richards murdered people during the incident and begins to doubt his guilt.

Damon Killian, host of The Running Man, approaches Richards hoping to use his notoriety to revive the show's ratings. He threatens to send the recaptured Weiss and Laughlin into the game unless Richards agrees to participate. As the show begins, Killian betrays Richards by sending him, Weiss, and Laughlin into the game zone—an abandoned section of L.A.—via rocket sleds.

The group is hunted by Subzero, a hockey-themed stalker whom Richards kills, marking the first time a runner has ever killed a stalker. Meanwhile, Amber is caught retrieving the uncut Bakersfield footage and is sent into the zone. Killian sends in two more stalkers—the chainsaw-wielding Buzzsaw and the electricity-shooting Dynamo. Richards kills Buzzsaw, though Laughlin is fatally wounded. Elsewhere, Weiss discovers that the satellite uplink controlling government broadcasts is located inside the zone, and he cracks the access code for Amber to memorize before Dynamo kills him. Richards incapacitates Dynamo but refuses to kill him while he is defenseless, shocking the audience.

When Killian secretly offers Richards a job as a stalker, Richards angrily refuses. Amber later finds the corpses of the show's past "winners", realizing their victories were fabricated, and Richards kills the flamethrower-wielding Fireball. The audience begins cheering for Richards.

Richards and Amber are found by resistance leader Mic and taken to their command center. Killian tries to force retired stalker Captain Freedom to fight Richards, but he refuses unless he can fight him honorably. ICS instead fabricates footage showing Freedom killing Richards and Amber. Seeing this broadcast, Richards realizes that the government must ensure they are never seen alive again.

Using the satellite uplink codes, Mic transmits an exposé revealing Killian's and the government's lies, including the unedited Bakersfield footage, while Richards leads resistance fighters in a takeover of ICS to prevent the broadcast from being shut down. The resistance battles ICS security forces as the studio audience flees. Dynamo attempts to rape Amber, but she activates the sprinkler system, electrocuting him. Richards confronts Killian, forces him into a rocket sled, and sends him into the game zone, where the uncontrolled vehicle crashes and explodes, killing him. Richards and Amber kiss as the crowd celebrates, and the broadcast goes offline.

== Cast ==
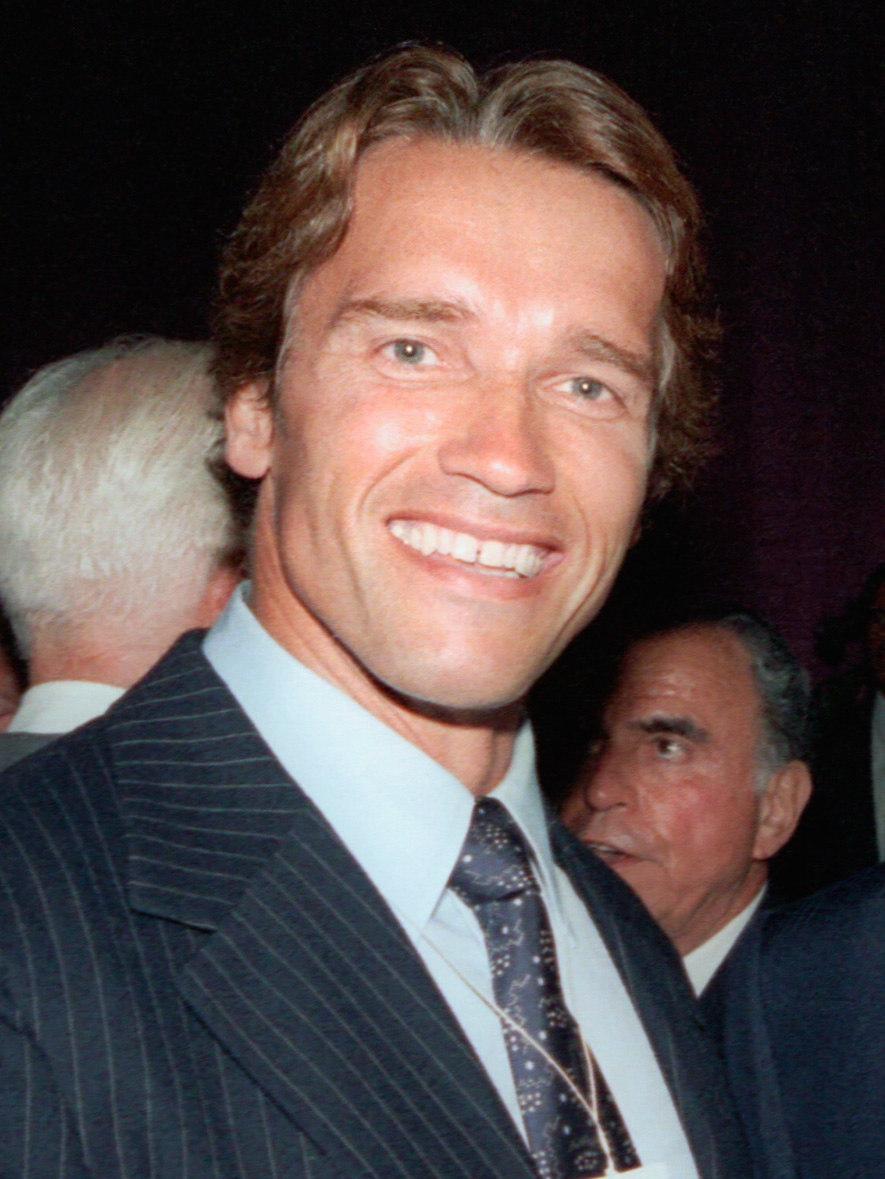
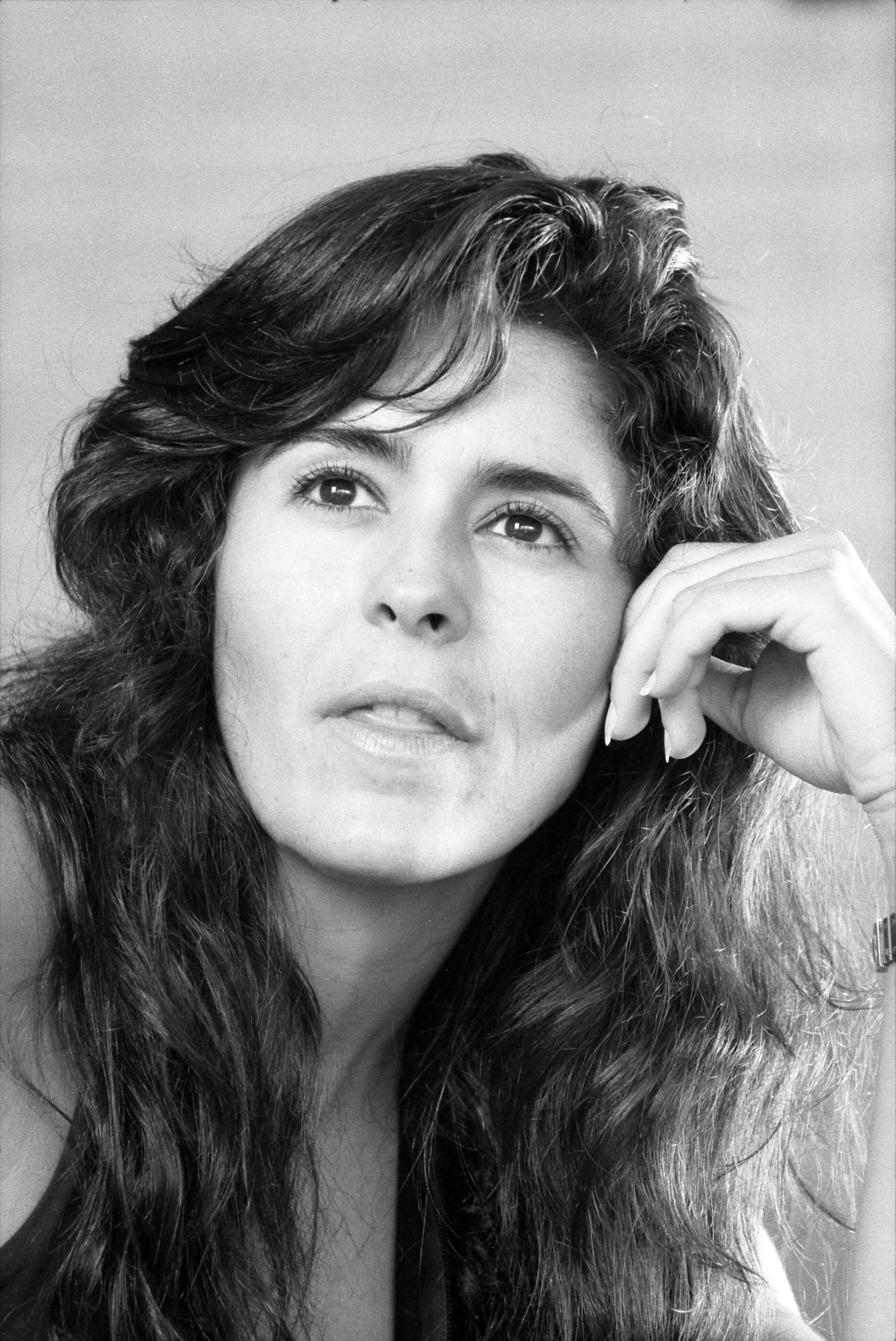
Arnold Schwarzenegger (pictured in 1984) and María Conchita Alonso (1986)
- Arnold Schwarzenegger as Ben Richards
- María Conchita Alonso as Amber Mendez
- Yaphet Kotto as William Laughlin
- Richard Dawson as Damon Killian
- Jim Brown as Fireball
- Jesse Ventura as Captain Freedom
- Erland Van Lidth as Dynamo
- Marvin J. McIntyre as Harold Weiss
- Gus Rethwisch as Buzzsaw
- Professor Toru Tanaka as Subzero
- Mick Fleetwood as Mic
- Dweezil Zappa as Stevie

The cast of The Running Man also includes Karen Leigh Hopkins as Brenda, Sven Thorsen as Sven, Edward Bunker as Lenny, Bryan Kestner as Med Tech, Anthony Penya as Valdez, Kurt Fuller as Tony, Kenneth Lerner as Agent, Dey Young as Amy, Rodger Bumpass as Phil Hillton, Dona Hardy as Mrs. McArdle, Lynne Marie Stewart as Edith Wiggins, Bill Margolin as Leon, George P. Wilbur as Lieutenant Saunders, and Thomas Rosales Jr. as Chico.

== Production ==
The film was initially due to be filmed in Canada in September 1985 directed by George P. Cosmatos with Christopher Reeve due to play Ben Richards. In a 2015 interview about the film, Paul Michael Glaser said that he was originally approached to direct the film but declined because he felt that the preproduction period was insufficient. Cosmatos left the production due to budget disputes and was replaced by Andrew Davis, while Reeve was replaced by Schwarzenegger, and filming eventually started in September 1986. After just two weeks, Davis was fired because the production was one week behind schedule, and Glaser was hired. Arnold Schwarzenegger has stated this was a "terrible decision," as Glaser "shot the movie like it was a TV show, losing all the deeper themes." LA Weekly stated that the film's tone changed from a dark allegory to a humorous action film with the change of the film's star. With Reeve, The Running Man was about an unemployed man who goes on a violent game show for a 30-day period to feed his family. With Glaser and Schwarzenegger, the protagonist became a condemned but innocent criminal, forced into a 3-hour-long gladiator-style game show by the justice system. Screenwriter Steven E. de Souza wrote 15 drafts of the script over the course of the film's development.

Originally, when Captain Freedom is shown killing Richards and Amber, audiences were meant to believe that both had actually been killed, with the film revealing that their deaths had been faked with computer graphics only later. After test screenings, a producer had the edit changed over the objections of screenwriter de Souza to make it clear that neither character was actually dead, claiming that audiences didn't understand the twist.

Pop star Paula Abdul choreographed the preshow dance sequences. This was her second film credit, though she had already choreographed 4 Janet Jackson videos, as well as videos by ZZ Top, Duran Duran, and Debbie Gibson. The music used for the preshow entertainment was composed by Jackie Jackson and was dubbed "Paula's Theme" in honor of Paula Abdul.

The producers originally wanted Chuck Woolery to play Damon Killian, but Woolery was unavailable due to his hosting jobs on Love Connection and Scrabble. Schwarzenegger suggested Richard Dawson to play Killian because he and Dawson were close friends and Schwarzenegger was a fan of Family Feud, which Dawson hosted.

== Music ==
=== Soundtrack ===
The film's soundtrack was composed by Harold Faltermeyer and includes music by Wolfgang Amadeus Mozart, Richard Wagner, Jackie Jackson, Glen Barbee, and John Parr, who performed the main theme of the film, "Restless Heart (Running Away With You)" (written by John Parr and Harold Faltermeyer and produced by Faltermeyer) and played during the final scene and end credits. An expanded Deluxe Edition, featuring the full score along with source music and previously unreleased alternate cues, was released in 2020 by Varese Sarabande (who also released the original album in 1987) on both CD and vinyl.

Being also an opera singer, wrestler, and actor, Erland van Lidth performs in his role as Dynamo part of the aria "Hai già vinta la causa... Vedrò mentr'io sospiro" out of Mozart's The Marriage of Figaro.

== Release ==
The film's release was postponed from summer 1987 to Thanksgiving 1987 at the producers' request, so it would be the only action thriller released during the holiday season. The film opened on 1,692 screens in the USA and Canada on November 13, 1987. This was two months after the death of cast member Erland Van Lidth, who played Dynamo.

=== Home media ===
Artisan Entertainment released the film on DVD in December 1997, and again in 2004. The 2004 release includes new special features, audio commentaries, and surround sound mix.

On February 9, 2010, Lionsgate released the film on Blu-ray with a 7.1 surround sound mix. Olive Films (under licence from Paramount, who owns the film due to having the Taft Pictures library) re-released the film on DVD and Blu-ray, with the original 2-channel surround mix, on February 19, 2013.

In 2022, for the film's 35th anniversary, Paramount Home Entertainment released an Ultra HD 4K Blu-ray on November 8, 2022. The disc includes HDR-10, Dolby Vision, and a 5.1 surround mix.

=== Plagiarism lawsuit ===
A lawsuit determined the movie was plagiarized from the 1983 French film Le Prix du Danger (The Prize of Danger) directed by Yves Boisset, which was based on Robert Sheckley's 1958 short story "The Prize of Peril", just like the 1970 West German TV movie Das Millionenspiel (The Million Game). It took director Boisset eight years to receive the damages to which he was entitled, which he claimed barely covered the costs of bringing the action.

== Reception ==
=== Box office ===
In The Running Man's opening weekend, it grossed $8,117,465. The film's total gross in the United States and Canada was $38,122,105.

=== Critical response ===
On the review aggregator website Rotten Tomatoes, 59% of 124 critics' reviews are positive. The website's consensus reads: "Combining slick production values and a strong cast with predictable thrills and a surprisingly muted Schwarzenegger, The Running Man is an uneven albeit occasionally rousing sci-fi action satire." Metacritic, which uses a weighted average, assigned the film a score of 45 out of 100, based on 12 critics, indicating "mixed or average" reviews. Audiences polled by CinemaScore gave the film an average grade of "B+" on an A+ to F scale.

Roger Ebert of the Chicago Sun-Times gave the film two-and-a-half stars out of four, complaining that "all the action scenes are versions of the same scenario", but praised Dawson's performance, stating that he "has at last found the role he was born to play." Vincent Canby of The New York Times wrote that the film "has the manners and gadgetry of a sci-fi adventure film, but is, at heart, an engagingly mean, cruel, nasty, funny send-up of television. It's not quite Network, but then it also doesn't take itself too seriously." Variety wrote that the film "coarsens the star's hitherto winning formula" and "works only on a pure action level," calling the satire "paperthin and constantly contradicted by the film wallowing in the sort of mindless violence for the roller derby-addicted masses it is supposedly criticizing." Dave Kehr of the Chicago Tribune gave the film two stars out of four and wrote, "It's a format all right, but it may be too much of a format for a feature-length film. With Arnold Schwarzenegger, a former state security officer framed as the perpetrator of a notorious public massacre, sitting in as victim-of-the-week, The Running Man has little to do but run through the game's four stages."

Michael Wilmington of the Los Angeles Times declared, "The Running Man is, by far, Schwarzenegger's best vehicle since The Terminator—not such high praise if you recall what came in between—and it suggests that his Frank Frazetta frame shows best in these fantasy sci-fi settings ... For the right audience, it'll be fun. It's for action fans with a taste for something off the beaten track—but not too far." Rita Kempley of The Washington Post called the film "a fast-paced, futuristic purée of Beat the Clock, Max Headroom, professional wrestling and The Most Dangerous Game. Pumped and primed for self-parody, the burly star proves as funny as he is ferocious in this tough guy's commentary on America's preoccupation with violence and game shows."

Reed Tucker of the New York Post said in 2019 that the film "correctly predicted ... the widening gap between the rich and poor", depicting homeless shantytowns and skyscrapers for the wealthy resembling the real New York City and Los Angeles, and societal obsession with reality TV. De Souza said one of the producers of American Gladiators sold his show with clips from The Running Man, telling the network "We're doing exactly this, except the murdering part".

== Video game ==
In 1989, a video game based on the film was released for the MSX, ZX Spectrum, Commodore 64, Amstrad CPC, Amiga, and Atari ST. The game was developed by Emerald Software and published by Grandslam Entertainments.

The 1990 video game Smash TV was inspired by The Running Man.

== Remake ==
On February 19, 2021, Paramount Pictures announced that it would make a new film adaptation of the novel, one that would be more faithful to the source material, directed by Edgar Wright. The film was released in November 2025 starring Glen Powell.
