= Infrarouge =

French documentary television series

- Current logo
- Genre: Television documentary
- Presented by: Marie Drucker
- Country of origin: France
- Original language: French

Original release
- Network: France 2
- Release: 2 February 2006 – present

Infrarouge is a French documentary television series and TV news magazine, airing on France 2 since 2006. Since 2017, it has been presented by French journalist and news presenter Marie Drucker.

== Broadcast history ==
The program started in 2006, airing on the network France 2. It is broadcast on Tuesdays in the evening. Originally, it aired following the investigative documentary series Envoyé spécial. It is named for infrared light, "for what cannot be seen with the naked eye". The first episode, the documentary film Les Mystères sanglants de l'OTS, directed by Yves Boisset, aired 2 February 2006. In 2015, several of their documentaries were made available for free on YouTube. This was done in an effort to combat piracy, and also over complaints over the lateness of the slot in which the slot aired. It was previously available on the streaming site Pluzz (now france.tv).

In 2017, journalist and news presenter Marie Drucker became the presenter and producer of the program. Prior to this, there was no person presenting the program. She had stopped presenting news in mid-2016, instead focusing on documentary production, founding a production company later that year. The program was also to be followed by a new slot, titled 25 nuances de doc.

== Contents ==
Documentaries in the series focus on societal change and development. According to Fabrice Puchault, who was in charge of France 2's documentaries, the series initially focused on French society and its history. As of 2012, they had aired over 200 documentaries. Directors that have aired documentaries for the series include Julien Donada, Michael Pitiot, Nils Tavernier, and Yann Arthus-Bertrand.
