= Elisabeth Wiedemann =

German actress

- Born: 8 April 1926; Bassum, Lower Saxony
- Died: 27 May 2015 (aged 89); Marquartstein, Bavaria, Germany
- Occupation: Actress
- Known for: Ein Herz und eine Seele

Elisabeth Wiedemann (8 April 1926 – 27 May 2015) was a German actress and best known for her role as Else Tetzlaff in Ein Herz und eine Seele.

== Career ==
Starting out as a dancer and stage actress, Elisabeth Wiedemann became known to the nation as Else Tetzlaff in the German sitcom Ein Herz und eine Seele. After 21 episodes, Wiedemann moved on to other projects and declined to return to the show's revival in 1976. She later said that she put Else through all emotions possible and she wouldn't want to get tired of the character. The role was unsuccessfully recast with Helga Feddersen and the show was canceled after four new episodes.

Wiedemann moved away from comedy and took guest stints in crime shows like Derrick, The Old Fox und Tatort. In 1983, she starred in the two-part drama The Oppermanns.

Two years later, in 1985, Wiedemann played a supporting role in the feature film Otto - Der Film, her first comedic project after the end of Ein Herz und eine Seele.

Wiedemann returned to her roots as a dancer and stage actress the following years, only making rare appearances in television. After an episode of Das Traumschiff in 1995 and a guest appearance in Mama ist unmöglich in 1997, Wiedemann was said to have retired from acting.

However, she made several appearances on stage afterwards and was seen in Stubbe – Von Fall zu Fall and Ritas Welt in 2003, in another Tatort in 2004, SOKO 5113 in 2008 and Notruf Hafenkante in 2007 and 2011.

== Awards ==
In 1966, Elisabeth Wiedemann won the Goldene Kamera.

== Filmography ==
Year	Title	Role	Notes
1956	Herr Hesselbach und die Firma	Jutta Schäfer, Chefsekretärin	
1956	Spätere Heirat erwünscht	Ina	TV film
1970	Butterflies Don't Cry	Mrs Wagner	
1970	Das Millionenspiel	Frau Steinfurth	TV film
1984	What's Up, Chancellor?	Frau Hillermann	
1985	Otto - Der Film	Konsulin von Kohlen und Reibach	
1991	Hausmänner	Laemmlein	
