= La Fraternité =

2023 documentary miniseries

- Premiere poster
- Genre: Documentary
- Written by: Pierre Morath; Éric Lemasson
- Directed by: Pierre Morath; Éric Lemasson
- Music by: Kevin Queille
- Country of origin: Switzerland
- Original language: French
- No. of episodes: 4

Production
- Producers: David Rihs; Estève Fabrice; Éric Lemasson
- Cinematography: Gregory Bindschedler
- Running time: 52 minutes
- Production companies: Point Prod; Yuzu Production; Radio Télévision Suisse; Groupe Canal+

Original release
- Network: Radio Télévision Suisse
- Release: 8 February – 15 February 2023

La Fraternité, released in English as Order of the Occult: Inside the Sect of the Order of the Solar Temple, is a Swiss documentary television miniseries about the Order of the Solar Temple (OTS), notorious for numerous mass murder suicides in the 1990s. It was directed by Pierre Morath and Éric Lemasson, and premiered in February 2023 on RTS. The documentary features archival materials on the group that were previously unreleased, including videos that had been produced by the OTS itself. It also features interviews with former members, investigators, and researchers into the group.

Contrary to other works focusing on the OTS, it starts with its origins instead of beginning the narrative with the massacres. It received a positive critical reception, with praise for its usage of interview testimony and the previously unreleased videos and images. It was also complimented for its unique perspective on the case and its explanation of what led to the deaths, as well as its production quality and narrative.

== Premise ==
The documentary discusses the Order of the Solar Temple (OTS), notorious for several mass suicides and murders committed by its members in the 1990s. Led by Joseph Di Mambro and Luc Jouret, the first mass suicide by the group occurred in Switzerland with a separate mass murder occurring in Canada in 1994, killing 53 in total, including both leaders. The next year, 16 more would die in the Vercors in France, and a final five died in Canada in 1997. In the course of these events, 74 people would die. The case gained worldwide notoriety, resulting in legal changes over how cults are dealt with. The case had many aspects viewed as insufficiently explained by some commentators, with many conspiracy theories resulting.

The OTS had started as a genuine project to make a better world in the view of its members; the documentary starts before the Solar Temple, with its roots in another group in the 1970s, following its evolution and path towards the suicides and murders. Composer Michel Tabachnik was tried over his involvement in the case from his writings, accused by many at the time of having been the third leader of the OTS. He was eventually acquitted in two separate trials. The series follows the history of the OTS, with a particular focus on how it started and what led those involved to join, concluding with the end of Tabachnik's second court case.

== Interviewees ==
- Michel Tabachnik, conductor and former member of the OTS
- Charles Dauvergne, former member of the OTS
- Jean-François Mayer, religious historian and the only person to research the OTS before the deaths
- Michel Genoud, cantonal Fribourg police officer
- Pierre Nidegger, cantonal Fribourg police officer
- Éric Lemasson, journalist
- Thomas Krompecher, forensic doctor
- Alain Vuarnet, son and brother of two of the victims
- Luc Fontaine, examining magistrate into the Vercors deaths
- Francis Szpiner, Tabachnik's lawyer
- Jean-Pierre Jougla, lawyer for UNADFI

== Production and release ==
La Fraternité was a collaboration between the Geneva-based Point Prod company and its French counterpart, alongside RTS and Groupe Canal+. The series was co-written and directed by Éric Lemasson and Pierre Morath, and produced by David Rihs. Lemasson had followed the case since 1994, one of the journalists to arrive on the scene. In making the documentary, its creators had access to archival and legal materials that had not been published prior, including videos produced by the OTS itself of their conferences or religious rituals. The OTS, having often filmed themselves, had attempted to burn all their records with them but the ignition system had failed and the records were recovered. These were obtained from the justice system of the Swiss canton of Fribourg, who were responsible for most of the investigation into the case. The canton had wanted to release these archives in a safeguarded manner to highlight its history; Morath described some of the images in the archive as "completely insane" and said that they had not been edited.

It took two years to convince Tabachnik to be interviewed for this documentary; Morath described him as "traumatized" by the whole affair and that it was "almost a miracle" he had agreed, with a fear that people would distort his words as had happened before. At the end of the documentary, Tabachnik states, "I've told you what I had to tell. Now I'm going to get up, leave, and believe me, I'm going to collapse". Other people interviewed in the production of the documentary include the religious historian Jean-François Mayer, who was part of the investigation into the case, Alain Vuarnet, relative of two of the Vercors victims, and former member Charles Davergne. Former member Thierry Huguenin's testimony is presented through sound archival recordings.

Interviewed by Le Temps, Lemasson said that in making the documentary he had used the narrative styles of fiction. It was one of many documentaries made about the OTS; according to Rihs, the intention in making the documentary had been to provide a different perspective. Morath said that they intended to start from the beginning of the story, anchoring it around the beginning instead of the ending tragedy, as this provided a different perspective instead of dealing with "the logic of the cult". He also said they did not want to conduct another investigation themselves, as this would have been "a bottomless pit". Though he stated there was "nothing new to learn", he stated the new archival and interview materials allowed to tell the story reversed from its typical way for the first time. He also said an additional reason in making the series was the usage of the documentary format, which could appeal to younger audiences. According to Morath, the goal of the series was to "give a voice back to people who had been robbed of it by media fever."

The director takes a skeptical view of the theories relating to the events, with the director stating that contrary to other theories that emerged he believed that the Swiss investigation into the case was done fine, but that Tabachnik was scapegoated by the French justice system, and that there had been no need to look for other theories. He is doubtful of the theories of outside involvement in the second transit promoted by Alain Vuarnet. The documentary does not discuss the more conspiratorial theories alleging the links between the OTS and political powers, as put forward by the 2006 documentary Les Mystères sanglants de l'OTS, viewing them as unevidenced. He did note that at the end there still remained "gaps", but stated that he still hoped the series would help people understand; he also stressed the question of freedom of religion, and said that the whole series of events could not merely be explained through the lens of cultic manipulation. Morath said that they wanted to show "how any of us can, today, find ourselves trapped under the guise of an ideal that goes wrong and ends up in flames and bullets".

The series consists of four episodes 52 minutes each. It was screened at the Solothurn Film Festival on 22 January 2023, releasing on Play Suisse the same day. The series was first broadcast on RTS from 8 to 15 February 2023. It was the third documentary on the OTS to air in seven months; a TMC documentary on the case, Temple Solaire: l'enquête impossible, mostly focused on journalist testimonies in comparison. It was also released through the French TV provider Canal+.

== Episodes ==
| No. | Title | Directed by | Original release date |
|---|---|---|---|
| 1 | "Episode 1" | Pierre Morath, Éric Lemasson | February 8, 2023 |
| 2 | "Episode 2" | Pierre Morath, Éric Lemasson | February 8, 2023 |
| 3 | "Episode 3" | Pierre Morath, Éric Lemasson | February 15, 2023 |
| 4 | "Episode 4" | Pierre Morath, Éric Lemasson | February 15, 2023 |

== Reception ==
The Tribune de Genève rated it four out of five stars, saying it possessed "storytelling worthy of the best Netflix productions" and a "captivating" narrative. They noted it as being unique in that, while many other works had discussed the OTS to the point that "almost everything has already been said" about it, this one looked into its start in depth, with usage of archival materials that had not previously been released and interviews with former members. Le Temps said the series showed the taste among producers and the public for documentary series, particularly when it came to true crime cases. Le Matin called it a "less divisive" interpretation of the OTS story. Watson praised it as "excellently shot", a "meticulous decoding" of what had led to the deaths. They noted it as not demonizing cults, as "public opinion has already taken care of that".

A review from Jean Friedrich of the newspaper Le Regard Libre praised the documentary as "well-crafted" and exploiting the typical conventions of the genre, saying it shed more light on what had led to the tragedy and its "resolutely human origins". He praised it as a great feat from the RTS. He praised Tabachnik's testimony, which he said the documentary was centered around, calling it "eloquent" but also "sometimes painful", making the series "true to life". However, he criticized Tabachnik's complete denial of responsibility for anything that had occurred, but noted that Mayer and Lemasson's external analysis put his words and role in the group into context.
