= The Assassination (film) =

1972 film

- French film poster
- Directed by: Yves Boisset
- Written by: Ben Barzman; Jorge Semprún; Basilio Franchina
- Starring: Jean-Louis Trintignant
- Cinematography: Ricardo Aronovich
- Music by: Ennio Morricone
- Release dates: 4 October 1972 (Italy); 11 October 1972 (France)
- Running time: 120 minutes
- Countries: France; Italy
- Language: French

The Assassination (French: L'Attentat, lit. 'The Attack') is a 1972 French-Italian political thriller film directed by Yves Boisset. Starring Jean-Louis Trintignant, Gian Maria Volonté, and Roy Scheider. It was released in the U.S. as The French Conspiracy in an attempt to capitalize on Scheider having starred in the Oscar-winning action thriller The French Connection the year prior.

The film was inspired by the 1965 disappearance of Moroccan nationalist politician Mehdi Ben Barka in Paris. Shortly after his death, it emerged that Ben Barka had been abducted by French police, leading to speculation of a plot between Moroccan agents, French intelligence, and the CIA.

The Assassination was entered into the 8th Moscow International Film Festival where it won the Silver Prize.

== Plot ==
Colonel Kassar (Piccoli), an African dictator supported by the CIA, makes a pact with the French secret service to target Sadiel (Volonte), a politician from his home country who is currently in exile in Geneva. Sadiel is a left-wing idealist who hopes to someday return and lead a democratic opposition to Kassar's regime.

French intelligence targets François Darien (Trintignant), a militant left-wing French journalist who is active in radical causes. It is implied that Darien supported the FLN during the Algerian War, where he was arrested for killing a police officer and was turned into a police informant. Lempereur (Bouquet), a lawyer working with French intelligence, identifies Darien as a past associate of Sadiel.

Government agents blackmail Darien into working with them, though he believes his role is merely to facilitate Sadiel's travel from Geneva to Paris, where the leader will film a television program. Darien realizes that the program is a sham, but Lempereur tries to convince him that is cover for secret negotiations between Sadiel and Kassar.

Sadiel agrees to come to Paris. However, he is abducted by corrupt policemen before he can meet with Darien and Michael Howard (Scheider), an American TV correspondent working on the program. Darien follows Sadiel to a mobster's house, where he sees his mentor and realizes that he has betrayed him. He also realizes that he will be killed by French intelligence to cover up the operation.

Darien escapes and warns his girlfriend Edith (Seberg), but refuses to go to the police, who he considers corrupt. Edith contacts Sadiel's lawyer Vigneau (Cremer), who goes to the police but refuses to tell them where Darien is hiding. Reluctantly, Police Commissioner Rouannat (Perier) orders a search of the mobster's house, but does not find anything out of the ordinary except a strange knife (which Kassar had threatened Sadiel with).

Darien calls Howard and tells him to meet at his office, where he has recorded a tape that reveals everything. The call is recorded by French intelligence, who it is implied have been tapping Darien's phones the whole time. Howard shows up but kills Darien, revealing himself as a CIA asset, and makes his escape before French police arrive. Darien's death is framed as a suicide, and the tape as his confession. Rouannat is suspicious, but is ordered by his superiors not to look into the matter further.

== Cast ==
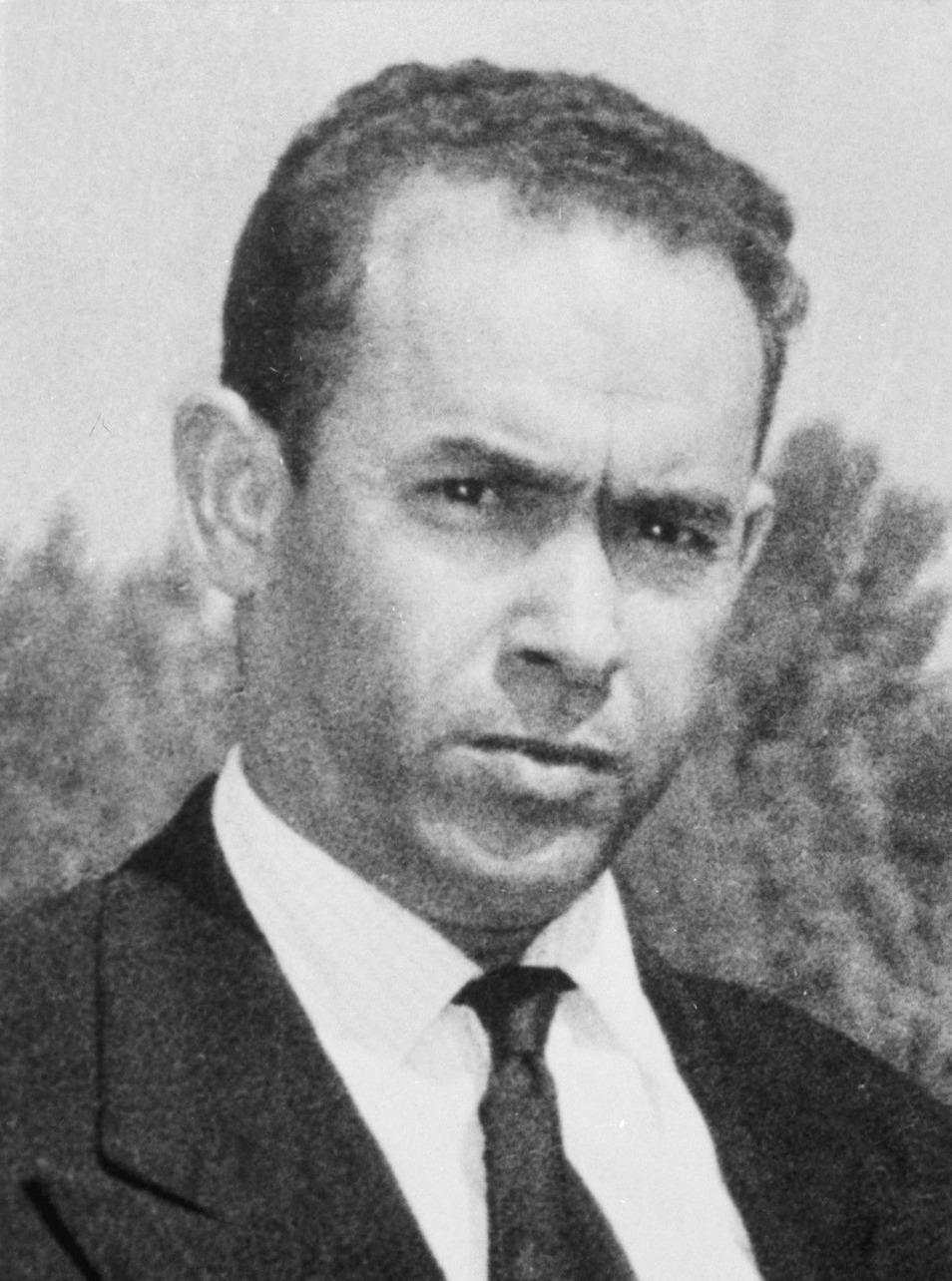
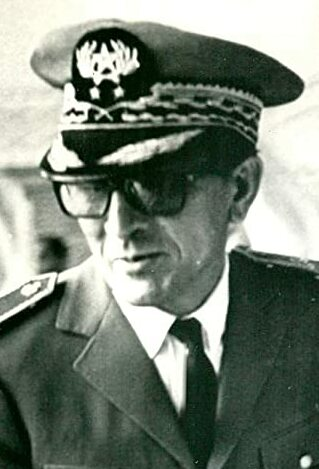
Mehdi Ben Barka (left) and Mohamed Oufkir inspired the dynamic between Sadiel and Kassar.
- Jean-Louis Trintignant as François Darien - an unstable intellectual
- Michel Piccoli as Colonel Kassar - the dictator of a North African country
- Jean Seberg as Edith Lemoine - a leftist nurse
- Gian Maria Volonté as Sadiel - a leading Maghreb progressive
- Michel Bouquet as Lempereur - a corrupt lawyer working with the French government
- Bruno Cremer as Michel Vigneau - Sadiel's lawyer
- Francois Perier as Commissioner Rene Rouannat - an honest police officer who investigates Sadiel's disappearance
- Roy Scheider as Michael Howard - an American TV correspondent who helps plan Sadiel's program
- Daniel Ivernel as Antoine Acconetti - a French mobster who cooperates with Kassar's plot
- Karin Schubert as Sabine
- Philippe Noiret as Pierre Garcin - a public television director who helps plan Sadiel's program
- Jacques François as Lestienne - the head of the French secret service
- Jean Bouise as a high-ranking French police officer and Rouannat's superior

== Reception ==
Writing for The New Yorker, Pauline Kael was critical of the film saying that the film could "stand as a textbook demonstration of how not to make a political movie." She lauds Gian Maria Volonté's performance in the film mentioning that he has a "commanding presence", but says the movie "takes the revolutionary political thriller backwards about as far as it can go."
