= Der Springteufel =

1974 film

- Written by: Derrick Sherwin
- Directed by: Heinz Schirk
- Starring: Dieter Hallervorden
- Country of origin: West Germany
- Original language: German

Original release
- Release: 1974

Der Springteufel (German for "The Jack-in-the-box") is a 1974 West German TV movie starring Dieter Hallervorden and Arno Assmann, directed by Heinz Schirk. It is a remake of the British television play Yob and Nabob (1965, in the anthology series Theatre 625), written by Derrick Sherwin, an English television writer best known for his work in Doctor Who. It is a psychological thriller about a hitchhiker to Frankfurt who takes the man who gives him a lift hostage and plays mind games with him. It was released on DVD in 2006.

== Cast ==
- Arno Assmann – Driver
- Dieter Hallervorden – Hitchhiker
- Hanna Seiffert
- Klaus Dieter Söder
- Manfred Böhm
- Hans Weverinck
- Hans Diener
