= Staatsschauspieler =

Highest title that could be awarded to a stage actor in Nazi Germany

The term state actor (German: Staatsschauspieler) has had different meanings in recent German history. In Nazi Germany, it was the highest title that could be awarded to a stage actor. Since 1945, the meaning has changed. In Baden-Württemberg, it is no longer simply a title of honor, but an official position.

== Nazi era ==
The honor of being a Staatsschauspieler, or State Actor, was awarded by Joseph Goebbels, the Reich Minister for Popular Enlightenment and Propaganda. It was a purely honorary title, which had no pecuniary benefits. The Nazi regime was invested in promoting the new medium of film to the public as means of propaganda, which is the reason that important stage actors were regularly used in film productions as well, making State Actors more popular to the general audience. Pure film stars, however, had no prospect of being awarded the title.

=== Bearer of the title in Nazi Germany (selection) ===
- Willy Birgel (1937)
- Hans Brausewetter (1939)
- Lina Carstens (1939)
- Olga Chekhova (1936)
- Lil Dagover (1937)
- Paul Dahlke (1937)
- René Deltgen (1939)
- Karl Ludwig Diehl (1939)
- Albert Florath (1938)
- Heinrich George (1937)
- Alexander Golling (1938?)
- Gustaf Gründgens (1934)
- Lucie Höflich (1937)
- Emil Jannings (1936)
- Fritz Kampers (1939)
- Friedrich Kayßler
- Eugen Klöpfer (1934)
- Maria Koppenhöfer (1943)
- Werner Krauss (1934)
- Hans Leibelt (1934)
- Wolfgang Liebeneiner (1942)
- Theodor Loos (1937)
- Bernhard Minetti (1938)
- Paul Otto (1937)
- Erich Ponto (1938)
- Johannes Riemann (1939)
- Heinz Rühmann (1940)
- Josef Sieber (1938)
- Emmy Sonnemann (1934)
- Hermann Thimig (1938)
- Hedwig Wangel (1939)
- Paul Wegener (1937)
- Mathias Wieman (1937)
- Marianne Hoppe

== Federal Republic of Germany ==
Since the end of the Second World War the title of "state actor" is awarded by Berlin and Hamburg Senates, and by the states of Bavaria, Saarland and Baden-Württemberg.

=== Bearer of the Baden-Wuerttemberg title (selection) ===
- Robert Bürkner
- Just Gerhard (1972)
- Werner Schramm (1972)

=== Bearer of the Bavarian title (selection) ===
- Gustl Bayrhammer
- Martin Benrath
- Toni Berger
- Hans Clarin
- Max Griesser
- Thomas Holtzmann
- Elfriede Kuzmany
- Karl Lieffen
- Ursula Lingen
- Elisabeth Orth
- Christine Ostermayer
- Hans-Michael Rehberg
- Fritz Straßner
- Adolf Ziegler

=== Bearer of the Berlin title (selection) ===
- Martin Held (1963)
- Carl Raddatz (1963)
- Erich Schellow (1963)
- Siegmar Schneider (1963)
- Hans Sohnker (1968)
- Friedrich W. Bauschulte (1970)
- Horst Bollmann (1970)

=== Bearer of the Saarland title (selection) ===
- Hans-Georg Körbel
- Christiane Motter
