= Ein Herz und eine Seele =

German television sitcom

- Genre: Sitcom
- Created by: Wolfgang Menge (based on Till Death Us Do Part, created by Johnny Speight)
- Starring: Heinz Schubert; Elisabeth Wiedemann (season one); Hildegard Krekel; Diether Krebs (season one); Helga Feddersen (season two); Klaus Dahlen (season two)
- Country of origin: West Germany
- Original language: German
- No. of seasons: 2
- No. of episodes: 25

Production
- Running time: 44 minutes

Original release
- Network: WDR; Das Erste
- Release: 15 January 1973 – 22 November 1976

Related
- Till Death Us Do Part; All in the Family

Ein Herz und eine Seele (literally "One Heart and One Soul" i.e. "hand in glove") is a German television sitcom based on the British sitcom Till Death Us Do Part by Johnny Speight. The show premiered on 15 January 1973 and lasted for 25 episodes (22 original stories and 3 remakes), airing its last on 22 November 1976, the last four episodes featuring a revamped cast. Ein Herz und eine Seele was written by Wolfgang Menge.

The show was extremely successful during its initial run and it still proves very popular in reruns, in which only the colour episodes are traditionally aired. Two episodes in particular, Sylvesterpunsch (about the family's New Year's Eve party) and Rosenmontagszug (set during the winter carnival season) have gained such popularity that they are now shown traditionally on German TV on New Year's Eve and Rosenmontag, respectively.

== Storyline ==
The show reflects the life of a petty bourgeois family in West German Wattenscheid, characterised by the social climate of the Willy Brandt era and its political upheavals initiated by the German student movement of 1968. Ein Herz und eine Seele makes intensive use of references to German politics and social issues of the early and mid-1970s, when Germany was still divided, not just between East and West, but also (in the case of West Germany) between liberals and conservatives. To feature these tensions in a TV series broke new ground at that time.

The undisputed star is Ekel ("creep") Alfred Tetzlaff (Heinz Schubert), commercial clerk, a born Sudeten German, Bild reader and reactionary patriarch, who is constantly arguing with his wife Else, his daughter Rita, and his son-in-law Michael. He is a declared foe of the SPD government ruining the country only to sell it to the Mongols, of foreigners, Gastarbeiter, Jews and the women's movement. During his term of service in the Wehrmacht he had spent time in Paris, which finds expression in his (dubious) language skills. Alfred's appearance, small in physique (Schubert was 157 cm or 5 ft 2 in) with a moustache and side-parted hair, along with his passionate politicking with a high-pitched voice and frequent hand movements, make his character somewhat of a parody of Adolf Hitler. Raised in Berlin he is a dedicated fan of Hertha BSC, which makes life somewhat hard in the Ruhr area.

Alfred is married (afflicted) with Else, a housewife from Elmshorn, whose fatuity constantly drives him mad. She ceaselessly speaks up, confusing Pompidou with Pompadour and Kiesinger with Kissinger, honestly astonished that the Germans had elected a Jewish chancellor. (In this sense, although the German Else was named after the British version of the character, the quiet but sometimes snarky Else Garnett, the character more closely resembled Edith Bunker from the American version of the show, All in the Family.) Ironically, Alfred's use of "dusselige Kuh", literally "silly cow", as a nickname for Else was not allowed in the BBC original: the British character Alf Garnett had to refer to his wife as a "silly moo".

The young couple, Rita and her husband Michael, cannot afford an apartment and live in Rita's child's room. Michael is a supporter of Chancellor Willy Brandt and moreover was raised in East Germany, which arouses Alfred's suspicion of him being a Komsomol, a Bolshevik hyena and an anarchist. Michael's parents still live in East Germany; as retirees they are allowed to visit their son and his new family in the episode Besuch aus der Ostzone ("Visit from the Eastern Zone"), an episode which exists both in black-and-white and colour and is usually aired on German Unity Day.

== Broadcast ==
The show was originally broadcast in black and white and shown on the regional channel of the North Rhine-Westphalia area, WDR. It moved to West Germany's first channel, ARD, on New Year's Eve 1973 with the above-mentioned episode and from that date was produced in colour. Three of the colour ARD episodes are actually remakes or reprises of black-and-white episodes that had previously aired on WDR. Episodes were regularly recorded live-to-tape the day of broadcast, which allowed the show to handle events with an immediacy rare for sitcoms of the era.

For the second series, Elisabeth Wiedemann, popular in her role as Else Tetzlaff, was replaced by Helga Feddersen and Michael, formerly played by Diether Krebs, was portrayed by Klaus Dahlen. Whereas the original actors portrayed stereotypical but believable characters, Feddersen and Dahlen turned their roles into purely comedic characters, introducing slapstick. Only four episodes were produced of Season 2, with the final episode, "Closing Words," serving as the series finale.

Despite its polarization and abusive language, the series was initially very popular with up to 15.7 million viewers. It declined in the ratings due to the cast changes in the second series. In 2002, a survey showed the program was Germany's most popular sitcom of all time.

In 2004 the complete series was released to DVD and was a best seller.

== Episodes ==
=== WDR episodes (black-and-white, 1973) ===
Number	Title (original)	Title (English)	Date
01	Das Hähnchen	"The Chicken"	15 January 1973
02	Der Fernseher	"The Television Set"	29 January 1973
03	Besuch aus der Ostzone	"Visit from the Eastern Zone"	12 February 1973
04	Die Beerdigung	"The Funeral"	26 February 1973
05	Die Bombe	"The Bomb"	12 March 1973
06	Hausverkauf	"Selling the House"	26 March 1973
07	Silberne Hochzeit	"Silver Anniversary"	9 April 1973
08	Urlaubsvorbereitung	"Holiday Preparations"	30 April 1973
09	Erntedankfest	"Thanksgiving Harvest Festival"	1 October 1973
10	Eine schwere Erkrankung	"A Severe Illness"	28 October 1973
11	Der Sittenstrolch	"The Pervert"	26 November 1973

=== ARD season 1 (colour, 1973–1974) ===
Number	Title (original)	Title (English)	Date
12	Sylvesterpunsch	"New Year's Eve Punch"	31 December 1973
13	Der Ofen ist aus	"The Oven is Out"	28 January 1974
14	Rosenmontagszug	"Rosenmontag Parade" (idiomatically, "Mardi Gras")	25 February 1974
15	Frühjahrsputz	"Spring Cleaning"	18 March 1974
16	Selbstbedienung	"Self-Service"	13 April 1974
17	Besuch aus der Ostzone	"Visit from the Eastern Zone" (colour remake)	17 June 1974
18	Urlaubsvorbereitung	"Holiday Preparations" (colour remake)	15 July 1974
19	Tapetenwechsel	"Wallpaper" (idiomatically, "Change of Scenery")	12 August 1974
20	Der Staatsfeind	"Enemy of the State"	9 September 1974
21	Der Sittenstrolch	"The Pervert" (colour remake)	4 November 1974

=== ARD season 2 (1976) ===
Number	Title (original)	Title (English)	Date
22	Telefon!	"Telephone!"	31 May 1976
23	Massage	"Massage"	5 July 1976
24	Modell Tetzlaff	"Model Tetzlaff"	27 September 1976
25	Schlußwort	"Closing Words"	22 November 1976

== See also ==
- German television comedy
