= Didi's Comedy Show =

- Die Didi-Show
- Country of origin: Germany

Didi's Comedy Show (other title: Die Didi-Show) is a 1989 German comedy television show created by and starring Dieter Hallervorden that ran for 10 episodes. It co-starred comedians Frank Zander and Rotraud Schindler, cabarettist Wolfgang Bahro, and voice actors Constanze Harpen and Eberhard Prüter (the latter of whom was best known for the voice of Squidward Tentacles in the German dub of SpongeBob SquarePants.)

Didi is a bumbling fool of a detective who is struck by "brilliant" ideas which turn out disastrously; he eventually comes out on top, however.

The show is based partly on Didi's comedic antics, many of which would be impossible in real life. For example, he takes part in a hammer throwing competition at a police sports event, forgets to let go of the hammer, and is pulled by centrifugal force into the skies; he is saved by hanging on to an aeroplane.

It aired in India on DD National, Hungama TV and Jetix,

The German version without English Subtitles is available in the YouTube channel.
