= Du, die Wanne ist voll =

1978 parody song by Helga Feddersen and Dieter Hallervorden

Single by Helga Feddersen and Dieter Hallervorden
- Released: 1978
- Recorded: 1978
- Genre: Pop/Schlager
- Length: 3:00
- Songwriters: Helga Feddersen and Dieter Hallervorden

Helga Feddersen and Dieter Hallervorden singles chronology
"Du, die Wanne ist voll" (1978)	"Gib mir bitte einen Kuss" (1981)

"Du, die Wanne ist voll" is a parody of the song "You're the One That I Want", by German comedians Helga Feddersen and Dieter Hallervorden. It was released as a single in 1978.

It is sung in a bizarre mixture of German and English, with the middle-aged Hallervorden and Feddersen pretending to be youthful lovers. The music video was produced by NDR.

"Du, die Wanne ist voll" literally translates to '[Hey,] You, the bathtub is full', fitting in syllable length, and the joke consists of partially using German words that sound similar to the English ones (like soramimi or a deliberate mondegreen).

The single reached number four on the German Singles Chart.

== Charts ==
Chart (1978–79)	Peak position
Austria (Ö3 Austria Top 40)	12
West Germany (GfK)	4
