= Das Millionenspiel =

- Written by: Wolfgang Menge
- Directed by: Tom Toelle
- Music by: Irmin Schmidt
- Country of origin: West Germany
- Original language: German

Production
- Producer: Peter Märthesheimer
- Cinematography: Rudolf Holan; Jan Kalis
- Running time: 95 minutes

Original release
- Release: 18 October 1970

Das Millionenspiel ("The Game of Millions" or "Chance for a Million") is a 1970 West German action/sci-fi television film, directed by Tom Toelle and starring Jörg Pleva, Suzanne Roquette and Dieter Thomas Heck. It was aired by ARD (broadcaster) on 18 October 1970. Wolfgang Menge wrote the screenplay, adapting the short story "The Prize of Peril" by the American writer Robert Sheckley. Wolfgang Menge and Tom Toelle received the 1971 Prix Italia for best television movie.

== Plot ==
Das Millionenspiel ("The Game of Millions") is a popular show on the (fictional) TETV channel. To win the grand prize of one million German marks, a candidate has to survive seven days on the run while being hunted by the Köhler gang. Of the first 14 candidates, 8 were killed during the course of the game.

Bernhard Lotz from Leverkusen is the show's 15th candidate. After almost a week without sleep and little food, he is in agony and on the verge of physical collapse; Lotz could drop out, but there is the prospect of the grand prize of one million marks, and he knows the fate of one of his predecessors: when he forfeited the game, he was so derided as a coward that he eventually committed suicide.

The whole country watches the manhunt on TV, some fascinated, some disgusted. Lotz tries hiding, but he is always recognized. Some want to deliver him to the Köhler gang, but some help him. Throughout the game, the Köhler gang is always hot on his heels.

The action is interspersed with scenes from the studio, where jovial presenter Thilo Uhlenhorst also shares details from Lotz's life. Reporters relate the latest developments from the field, interrupted by sexualized commercials by the (fictional) "Stabil-Elite Group". Behind the scenes, game-makers manipulate the game by helping or harming Lotz.

In the grand finale, Lotz has to pass through the "death spiral" – a 28.40-meter-long tube of bulletproof glass with three openings through which the Köhler gang can shoot him. Lotz, who is on the verge of collapse and had been treated by doctors shortly before, is slightly wounded but reaches the goal and receives the million. But according to a doctor he is in a serious state of shock, and is taken from the studio to a hospital on a stretcher. Moderator Uhlenhorst declares the 15th edition of the game over and announces the next episode three weeks later.

== Cast ==
- Jörg Pleva: Bernhard Lotz
- Dieter Thomas Heck: Thilo Uhlenhorst
- Dieter Hallervorden: Köhler
- Josef Fröhlich: Witte
- Theo Fink: Hensel
- Friedrich Schütter: Moulian
- Peter Schulze-Rohr: Ziegler
- Annemarie Schradiek: Mother Lotz
- Elisabeth Wiedemann: Mrs. Steinfurth
- Joachim Richert: waiter
- Heribert Faßbender: reporter
- Arnim Basche: reporter
- Gisela Marx: reporter
- Andrea Grosske: Mrs. Grote
- Suzanne Roquette: Claudia von Hohenheim
- Ralf Gregan: paramedic

== Background ==
Intentionally "exaggerat[ing] the contemporary situation [in television] and project[ing] it into the future in order to illuminate the present", as Günter Rohrbach, then head of TV programming at WDR, said at the time, the film anticipated developments in the media, such as commercial television (which did not exist in West Germany until 1984), the drive for ratings, reality shows, the Big Brother effect, and constant interruptions by highly sexualized advertisements. It culminates in the presentation by Thilo Uhlenhorst (played by popular ZDF show host Dieter Thomas Heck) and his "reporters" (also represented by well-known television and sports reporters) who cover the manhunt like a sports event.

Menge used trimmed exterior shots and cleverly interspersed "documentaries" to heighten the authentic look and feel of the show. Lotz is shown evading pursuit by dangerous and dramatic means such as jumping out of windows. When the film premiered on 18 October 1970 on ARD, some viewers thought they were watching a real manhunt. Before the broadcast in 1970, an announcer said that "the rules of the game were in accordance with the January 7, 1973, federal law promoting leisure activities, as published in Bundesgesetzblatt (Germany), part 2, page 965". After the film ended, thousands of angry telephone calls, letters, and telegrams were received; some people even called the fictitious telephone number of the station and asked to register in the role of the hunted or a hunter. One woman wrote to put forward her husband's name to be hunted because the family needed the money.

== Rebroadcasts and DVD release ==
A mistake was made in securing the film rights: WDR had acquired rights from Goldmann Verlag, publishers of the book Das geteilte Ich containing "Der Tod spielt mit", the German translation of Robert Sheckley's short story on which the film was based, but Goldmann did not own the film rights, only the rights for the book. The US-based owner of the film rights, Joseph Cates, father of Phoebe Cates, prohibited further broadcasts and this was affirmed by the regional higher court Oberlandesgericht Frankfurt on 3 May 1977. Consequently, the film disappeared from television for more than 30 years after two broadcasts.

In 2002, the WDR acquired the rights from the current holder, StudioCanal, and aired the film on 8 July 2002. It was shown again on 6 April 2006 by the WDR after the death of director Tom Toelle, on 24 November 2007 by the Bayerischer Rundfunk, on 11 April 2009 again by the WDR, and on 17 April 2010 to celebrate the sixtieth anniversary of the ARD.

Once the legal issues were resolved, the film was released on DVD in April 2009, together with Menge's 1973 teleplay Smog, including interviews and documentaries with and about Wolfgang Menge and an audio commentary by leading actor Jörg Pleva.

== Other ==
The film was rated FSK 12. In 1982, the same story was adapted in France under the title Le prix du danger ("The prize of danger"). In the same year, a novel by Stephen King, published in the U.S., told a similar story; the 1987 film The Running Man with Arnold Schwarzenegger is loosely based on this novel.

The fictitious television show, including musical interludes, and the final sequence of the manhunt in the glass tunnel were filmed in the Gartlage hall in Osnabrück, a building normally used for livestock auctions. The comedian Dieter Hallervorden, who played the leader of the Köhler gang, was then still at the beginning of his acting career; he became known by the mid-1970s for the slapstick series Nonstop Nonsense.

The title music, 'Millionenspiel', was written and performed by the group Can and was released on the Lost Tapes CD in 2012.

== Awards ==
Wolfgang Menge and Tom Toelle were awarded the 1971 Prix Italia for the best original dramatic program.
