= Le prix du danger =

Le Prix du Danger
- Le Prix du Danger movie poster
- Directed by: Yves Boisset
- Written by: Yves Boisset; Jean Curtelin
- Based on: The Prize of Peril by Robert Sheckley
- Produced by: Norbert Saada
- Starring: Gérard Lanvin; Michel Piccoli; Marie-France Pisier; Bruno Cremer; Andréa Ferreol; Jean-Claude Dreyfus
- Cinematography: Pierre-William Glenn
- Music by: Vladimir Cosma
- Distributed by: UGC Distribution
- Release date: January 1983
- Running time: 100 min
- Countries: France; Yugoslavia
- Language: French
- Box office: 1,388,858 admissions (France)

Le Prix du Danger (The Prize of Peril) is a 1983 French-Yugoslav science fiction movie, directed by Yves Boisset. It is based on Robert Sheckley's short story "The Prize of Peril", published in 1958.

== Plot ==
In the near future, a popular TV show hosted by the charismatic Frédéric Mallaire (Michel Piccoli) features candidates hunted by volunteer killers who must run for their lives. In order to win the million dollar prize, François Jacquemard (Gérard Lanvin) volunteers to be the running man in the upcoming edition of the show. As the chase begins, François discovers that the show is rigged and that the ruthless broadcasting company CTV (led by cynical CEO Antoine Chirex (Bruno Cremer) and right-hand woman Laurence Ballard (Marie-France Pisier)) are actually helping candidates only to let them die at the very end of the show, therefore ensuring maximal audience throughout.

== See also ==
- Das Millionenspiel – West German TV movie from 1970
- The Running Man – 1987 film starring Arnold Schwarzenegger
- The Hunger Games (film series)

== Bibliography ==
- Willis, Donald C. (1985), Variety's Complete Science Fiction Reviews, Garland Publishing Inc, pp. 415–416, ISBN 978-0824087128
