= Back on Track (film) =

2013 film

- Film poster
- German: Sein letztes Rennen
- Directed by: Kilian Riedhof
- Starring: Dieter Hallervorden; Tatja Seibt
- Release date: 10 October 2013
- Running time: 114 minutes
- Country: Germany
- Language: German

Back on Track (German: Sein letztes Rennen) is a 2013 German tragicomedy film directed by Kilian Riedhof about fictional Olympic marathon champion Paul Averhoff who tries to escape the monotony of his old-age life in a retirement home by training to run again and participating in the Berlin Marathon. Well-known German comedian Dieter Hallervorden takes the leading role, Heike Makatsch plays his daughter.

Paul Averhoff, a Berlin-based runner legend of the 1950s and marathon winner at the 1956 Olympics in Melbourne, has to move into a retirement home at an advanced age at the urging of his daughter Birgit and his sick wife Margot, because Margot needs professional care. Until then, the Averhoffs had been running their own house and property, and the dreary life in the nursing home means a major change for Paul. With the kindergarten-like occupational therapy offered by the well-meaning home director, he even fears "handicrafting himself to death".

In order to escape his dull, everyday life, Paul begins running exercises in the nursing home's park. When other residents ask him why he is doing this, he announces that he wants to participate in the Berlin Marathon. Despite some misgivings, Margot becomes his trainer again, as many decades before.

Some residents, but especially the home's management, express resistance because Paul's obstinacy is disrupting the usual procedures. However, when one of the residents remembers his Olympic victory and even finds an old autograph card, the home's residents split into supporters and opponents of the project. A race in the park against the young male nurse Tobias, spontaneously suggested by Paul in an argument, is surprisingly won by Paul after an initial delay, because he is better able to manage his energies. But the resistance on the part of the home management becomes so strong that the Averhoffs decide to move into the city flat of their (protesting) daughter.

A few days before the marathon, Margot dies of a brain tumour, after which Paul, brought back to the home after a fierce argument with Birgit, suffers a violent mourning attack. As a result, he is sedated and restrained in his bed.

On the day of the marathon, however, Paul is freed by nurse Tobias and one of the residents who was previously his harshest critic, and driven to the start of the marathon. During the run, TV reports about him as "the most incredible comeback in sports history". Birgit also learns about her father's participation in the race and arrives in the afternoon with her boyfriend and all the nursing home residents in the stands of the Olympiastadion where Paul, albeit with a large gap, crosses the finish line and is celebrated by the audience.

An epilogue "one year later" shows Paul taking part in a family party at his daughter's, cradling his grandchild and looking at a photograph of Margot.

== Cast ==
- Dieter Hallervorden as Paul Averhoff
- Tatja Seibt as Margot Averhoff
- Heike Makatsch as Birgit Averhoff
- Katharina Lorenz - Frau Müller
- Katrin Sass as Rita
- Frederick Lau as Tobias
- Otto Mellies - Rudolf
- Annekathrin Bürger as Frau Mordhorst
