= Dieter Thomas Heck =

German television presenter, singer, and actor (1937–2018)

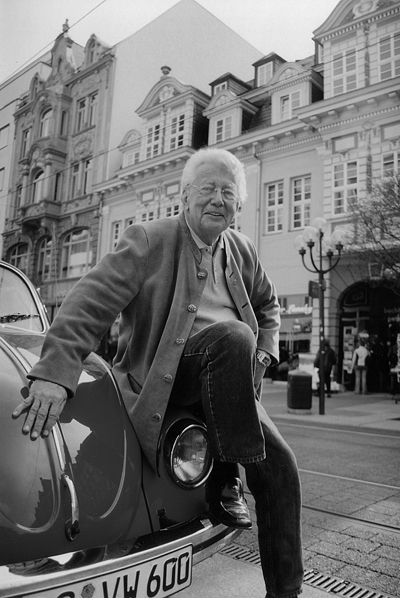
- Born: Carl-Dieter Heckscher; 29 December 1937; Flensburg, Germany
- Died: 23 August 2018 (aged 80); Berlin, Germany
- Occupations: Television presenter, singer and actor
- Years active: 1959–2018

Dieter Thomas Heck (born Carl-Dieter Heckscher; 29 December 1937 – 23 August 2018) was a German television presenter, singer and actor. He is known as the presenter of the popular TV program ZDF-Hitparade, featuring German Schlager music, from 1969 to 1984, reaching millions of people. As an actor, he starred in the TV play Das Millionenspiel in 1970.

== Early life ==
Heck was born in Flensburg, Germany and grew up in Hamburg. In April 1943, when he was five years old, he developed a stutter after being trapped under a staircase after a nighttime British bombing raid during World War II. The stutter went away after he received training in classical singing at age 16. After completing "Mittelschule" (middle school) and a technical "Oberschule" (high school) he was trained as a "Technischer Kaufmann" (technical salesman) by Borgward in Hamburg and worked afterwards as a salesman. He left the company after four years.

== Radio and television career ==
In 1959, Heck appeared on Peter Frankenfelds talent show Toi – Toi – Toi, singing Hippe-di-hipp, mein Mädchen. In 1961, he participated in the preliminary round of the Grand Prix Eurovision de la Chanson (now Eurovision Song Contest). After employment as a car salesman, Heck worked for a record company. He visited the radio station Südwestfunk (SWF) in Baden-Baden on 23 November 1963 and was asked to be interviewed because a scheduled guest did not show up. The moderator asked clumsy questions so Heck took over conducting the interview himself. As a result, Herbert Falk offered him the job of hosting a 90-minute "Sendung" (broadcast) every Saturday. Heck then worked for Radio Luxemburg from 1965 to September 1966. It was customary there to use only a first name, and as "Dieter" was already taken, Heck asked readers of the youth magazine Bravo for an alternative name. The readers chose "Thomas", and he used it since. He collaborated with Frank Elstner and they became friends.

He then worked for SR 1 Europawelle of the Saarländischer Rundfunk. He concentrated on German Schlager music, a topic not favored by other moderators. His series Die Deutsche Schlagerparade was so successful that it was partly recorded. In 1967, he was a co-founder of the award Goldene Europa for German singers, which was first awarded in 1968.

Heck's breakthrough came with ZDF-Hitparade, a TV series for the ZDF in Mainz, based on the model of the Schlagerparade and staged by Truck Branss. It was considered an influential music feature of the 1970s and 1980s. He presented it 183 times between 1969 and 1984. He showcased international performers, but they had to sing in German, including the Lebanese Ricky Shayne, the Greek Costa Cordalis, Bata Illic, Mireille Mathieu, Mouth & McNeal, Karel Gott, Michael Holm and Marianne Rosenberg.

Heck initiated the award Goldene Stimmgabel. From 1982 to 1989, he was also moderator for the Südwestfunk in the series Gute Laune aus Südwest and Vom Telefon zum Mikrofon. For the ZDF, he moderated 4 gegen 4 (1973), Die Pyramide (1978), Schwarz auf Weiß, Ihr Einsatz bitte – Made in Germany, Das ist ihr Leben (1994), Das große Los, Showpalast, Das Sommer-Hitfestival, Das Silvester-Hitfestival and finally Melodien für Millionen (Melodies for Millions), a gala for the benefit of the German Cancer Aid. He retired from the ZDF in 2007. He said then "It was my life to entertain people. That I succeeded makes me happy."("Mein Leben war es, Menschen zu unterhalten. Dass mir dies gelungen ist, macht mich glücklich"). Heck published his biography in 2011.

As an actor, in 1970 he starred in the role of the presenter in the TV play Das Millionenspiel. He played supporting roles in TV crime series, such as Tatort in 1981, Rosenheim-Cops, Praxis Bülowbogen, and Stuttgart Homicide in 2009.

== Personal life ==
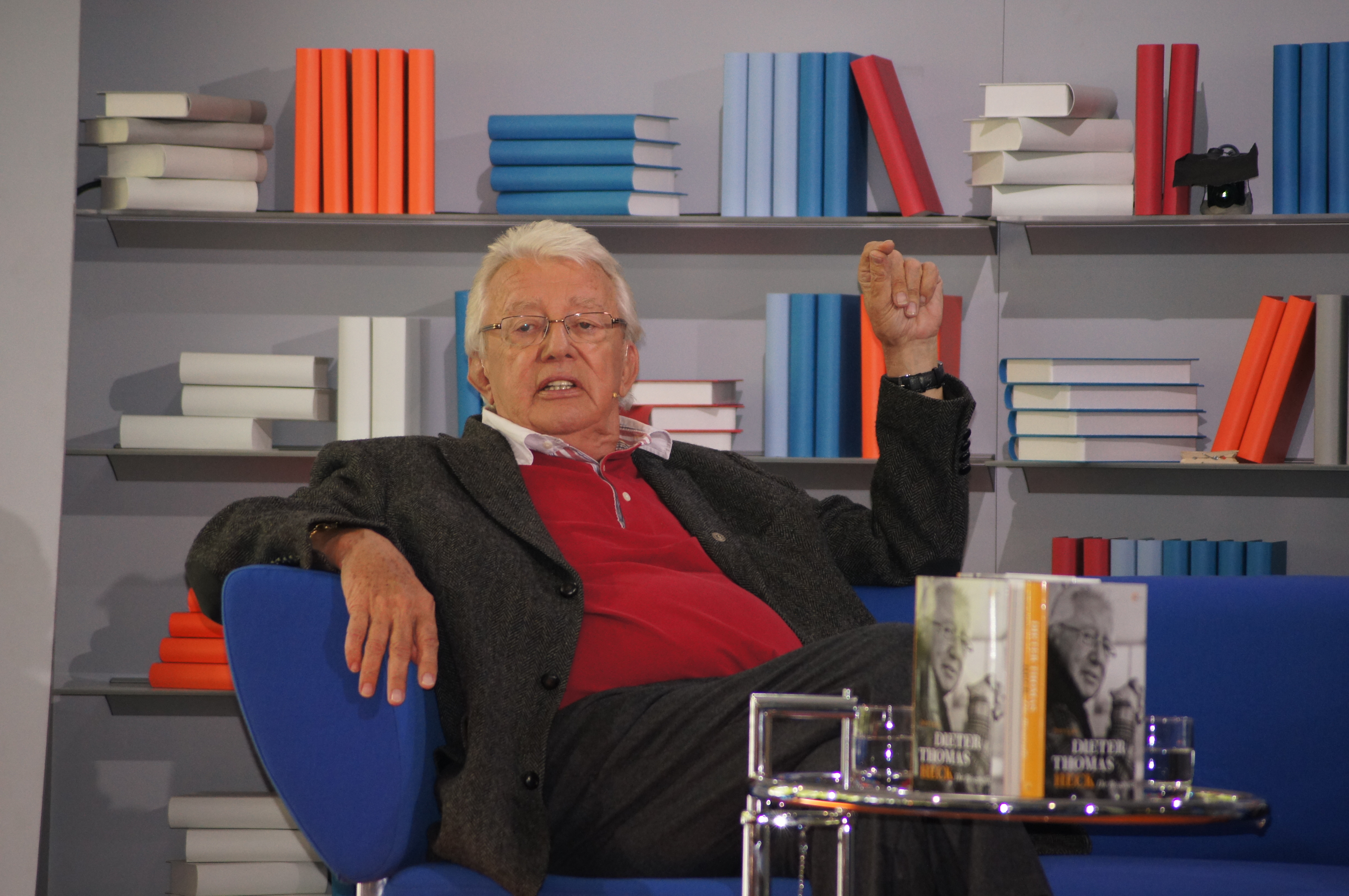
Dieter Thomas Heck talking to Marie Sagenschneider, 2011

Heck married in 1962 and again in 1976. He had two sons and one daughter. He died on 23 August 2018 in Berlin and he was buried at the Stahnsdorf South-Western Cemetery.

== Filmography ==
Heck played in several films, including:

- 1961: Schlagerparade 1961, film
- 1970: Das Millionenspiel
- 1971: Glückspilze
- 1971: Hurra bei uns geht´s rund
- 1972: Sternschnuppe
- 1973: Klimbim, TV series
- 1978: Café Wernicke, TV series
- 1981: Tatort – Beweisaufnahme
- 1983: Pankow '95
- 1987: Praxis Bülowbogen, TV series
- 1991: Manta – Der Film
- 1992: Tatort – Stoevers Fall
- 1993: Salto Postale, sitcom
- 1994: Heimatgeschichten TV series
- 1998: In aller Freundschaft TV series
- 1998: Und vor mir die Sterne
- 2008: Die Rosenheim-Cops
- 2009: Stuttgart Homicide
- 2010: C.I.S. – Chaoten im Sondereinsatz

== Radio and television shows ==
- 1966: Die deutsche Schlagerparade
- 1969–1984: ZDF-Hitparade
- 1978–1994: Die Pyramide
- 1981–2007: Goldene Stimmgabel
- 1988–2000: Deutsche Schlagerparade
- 1985–2007: Melodien für Millionen
- 1991–1998: Musik liegt in der Luft
- 1996–2000: Das große Los
- 1994, 1997–1999: Die deutschen Schlagerfestspiele

== Awards ==
- 1971: Goldene Kamera in the category Beste Sendung für junge Leute (best feature for young people) for ZDF-Hitparade
- 1984: Order of Merit of the Federal Republic of Germany
- 1999: Saarländischer Verdienstorden, the Order of Merit of the State of Saarland
- 2000: Verdienstmedaille of Baden-Württemberg, the Order of Merit of the State of Baden-Württemberg
- 2001: The Goldene Feder, a special prize for charity work
- 2003: Verdienstorden des Landes Rheinland-Pfalz, the Order of Merit of the State of Rhineland-Palatinate
- 2008: Echo Music Prize for exceptional merits for music in German
- 2009: Order of Merit of the Federal Republic of Germany
- 2012: Deutscher Musikpreis
- 2017: Goldene Kamera lifetime achievement award

== Literature ==
- Peter Lanz: Dieter Thomas Heck – Die Biographie, Edel Books. Hamburg 2011. ISBN 978-3-8419-0101-9.
