= You're the One That I Want =

1978 single by John Travolta and Olivia Newton-John

Single by John Travolta and Olivia Newton-John

from the album Grease: The Original Soundtrack from the Motion Picture
- B-side: "Alone at a Drive-In Movie" (instrumental)
- Released: March 1978 (US); May 1978 (UK)
- Recorded: 1977–1978
- Studio: Heider Studios; United/Western Studio
- Genre: Pop; bubblegum pop
- Length: 2:49
- Label: RSO
- Songwriter: John Farrar
- Producer: John Farrar

Olivia Newton-John singles chronology
"Don't Cry for Me Argentina" (1977)	"You're the One That I Want" (1978)	"Hopelessly Devoted to You" (1978)

John Travolta singles chronology
"Razzamatazz" (1977)	"You're the One That I Want" (1978)	"Summer Nights" (1978)

Professional ratings
Review scores
Source	Rating
AllMusic	Favorable

"You're the One That I Want," is a song performed by American actor and singer John Travolta and Anglo-Australian singer and actress Olivia Newton-John for the 1978 film version of the musical Grease. It was written and produced by John Farrar and released in 1978 by RSO Records as the second single from Grease: The Original Soundtrack from the Motion Picture. The song is one of the best-selling singles in history to date, having sold over 4 million copies in the United States and the United Kingdom alone with estimates of more than 15 million copies sold overall.

== Background ==
"You're the One That I Want" was one of the two singles, along with "Hopelessly Devoted to You," that Farrar wrote specifically for Newton-John's appearance in the film that had not been in the original stage musical. Randal Kleiser, the film's director, was not fond of this song because he felt that it did not mesh well with the rest of the Warren Casey-Jim Jacobs score and the fifties style musically or lyrically.

Record World called it "a frantic, up-tempo duet between the two stars that is bound to leave listeners breathless."

== Synopsis ==
Danny Zuko (Travolta), leader of the T-Birds, has recently lettered in cross-country running in an effort to win back his estranged girlfriend Sandy Olsson (Newton-John); unbeknownst to him, Sandy, who has been conflicted about her upright and proper etiquette in a school full of brash greasers, has herself transformed into a greaser queen to win back Danny. In the song, Danny expresses pleasant shock and arousal at Sandy's transformation, with Sandy responding that Danny must "shape up" to prove himself capable of treating her the right way.

The song originally written at this point in the original musical, "All Choked Up" (which had previously replaced a song titled "Kiss It"), was similar in theme, but different in style, written as a pastiche of Elvis Presley's "All Shook Up" and with Sandy being more provocative. "All Choked Up" was one of two songs from the Jacobs/Casey score that was excised completely from both the film and the film's soundtrack. Most 21st-century performances of the musical also include "You're the One That I Want" instead of "All Choked Up".

== Chart performance ==
Upon its release in conjunction with the film (and its status as a potential blockbuster worldwide), the single became a huge international hit. It reached number one in several countries.

In the United States, the single reached number one on the Billboard Hot 100 and on July 18 was certified Platinum for shipments exceeding 2 million copies. (It was already Gold by April 12.)

It also topped the UK Singles Chart for nine weeks in the summer of 1978, some months before the film had even been released in that country. As of 2018, it is still the fifth best-selling single of all time in the United Kingdom, where it has sold two million copies.

In Australia, the single spent nine nonconsecutive weeks at the top and became the best charting single of the year.

== 1998 re-release ==
A re-released "Martian remix" of the single by PolyGram Records reached #4 in the United Kingdom, and #27 in Australia in 1998. This was the twentieth anniversary of the film's debut.

== In popular culture ==
The song was used as the musical background for a fight scene inside a car between the titular characters of the 2024 Marvel Cinematic Universe film Deadpool & Wolverine.

== Charts ==
=== Weekly charts ===
Chart (1978–1979)	Peak position
Australia (Kent Music Report)	1
Austria (Ö3 Austria Top 40)	2
Belgium (Ultratop 50 Flanders)	1
Canada Top Singles (RPM)	2
Finland (Suomen virallinen lista)	1
Ireland (IRMA)	1
Israel (Israeli Singles Chart)	1
Italy (Musica e dischi)	3
Netherlands (Dutch Top 40)	1
Netherlands (Single Top 100)	1
New Zealand (Recorded Music NZ)	1
Norway (VG-lista)	1
Portugal (Musica & Som)	3
South Africa (Springbok Radio)	2
Switzerland (Schweizer Hitparade)	1
Sweden (Sverigetopplistan)	1
UK Singles (Official Charts)	1
US Billboard Hot 100	1
US Adult Contemporary (Billboard)	23
US Cash Box Top 100	3
US CHR/Pop Airplay (Radio & Records)	3
West Germany (GfK)	1
Quebec (ADISQ)	1

Chart (1998)	Peak position
Australia (ARIA)	27
Austria (Ö3 Austria Top 40)	26
Belgium (Ultratop 50 Flanders)	33
Belgium (Ultratop 50 Wallonia)	15
Europe (European Hot 100 Singles)	29
Netherlands (Single Top 100)	62
Switzerland (Schweizer Hitparade)	34
UK Singles (OCC)	4

Chart (2022)	Peak position
Canada Digital Song Sales (Billboard)	25
US Digital Song Sales (Billboard)	17
UK Singles Downloads (Official Charts)	38

=== Year-end charts ===
Chart (1978)	Rank
Australia (Kent Music Report)	1
Canada Top Singles (RPM)	14
New Zealand (Recorded Music NZ)	2
South Africa (Springbok Radio)	17
UK Singles (OCC)	2
US Billboard Hot 100	13
US Cash Box Top 100	9

== Sales and certifications ==
Region	Certification	Certified units/sales
Belgium	—	170,000
Denmark physical	—	14,000
Denmark (IFPI Danmark) reissue	Platinum	90,000^{‡}
France (SNEP)	Gold	1,800,000
Germany (BVMI)	Gold	500,000^{^}
Ireland	—	25,000
Italy (FIMI) sales since 2009	Gold	35,000^{‡}
Netherlands (NVPI)	Platinum	200,000
New Zealand (RMNZ)	2× Platinum	60,000^{‡}
Spain (Promusicae)	Platinum	60,000^{‡}
Sweden	—	10,000
United Kingdom (BPI)	Platinum	2,072,035
United States (RIAA)	Platinum	4,000,000
Summaries
Worldwide	—	15,000,000
^{^} Shipments figures based on certification alone.^{‡} Sales+streaming figures based on certification alone.

== Craig McLachlan and Debbie Gibson version ==
"You're the One That I Want"

Single by Craig McLachlan and Debbie Gibson

from the album Grease – Original London Cast Recording
- Released: 1993
- Length: 3:27
- Label: Epic
- Songwriter: John Farrar

Debbie Gibson singles chronology
"Free Me" (1993)	"You're the One That I Want" (1993)	"For Better or Worse" (1995)

Craig McLachlan singles chronology
"Time Warp" (1992)	"You're the One That I Want" (1993)	"Grease" (1993)

In 1993, the version by Craig McLachlan and Debbie Gibson was released by Epic Records as the lead single from Grease – Original London Cast Recording, the soundtrack of the 1993 London revival of the musical Grease, in which both McLachlan and Gibson starred. It peaked at number thirteen on the UK Singles Chart.

Chart (1993)	Peak position
Ireland (IRMA)	24
Israel (Israeli Singles Chart)	27
UK Singles (Official Charts)	13
Europe (Eurochart Hot 100)	43
UK Airplay (Music Week)	24

== Other versions ==
British comedians Arthur Mullard and Hylda Baker also released a version of the song in 1978. Their version reached No. 22 in the United Kingdom.

In 1978, the German comedians Dieter Hallervorden and Helga Feddersen released a parody version under the title "Du, die Wanne ist voll". The song reached position number four in the German charts.

Also in 1978, the Swedish crooner Svante Thuresson released a version in Swedish under the title "Det är dej jag vill ha". The song reached position number four in the Svensktoppen.

Also in 1978, Finnish singers and siblings Anna and Kirka Babitzin released a Finnish version translated by Pertti Reponen, "Sinut haluan vain" ("I Only Want You").

In 2004, British band The Beautiful South also covered the song with their album "Golddiggas, Headnodders and Pholk Songs".

In 2010, Angus & Julia Stone released a cover of the song on the track list of their single "Big Jet Plane". In 2012, the song peaked at No. 21 on the UK Independent Singles Chart.

In 2017, American singer Charlotte Lawrence released a cover of the song.

In 2021, American rapper and singer Doja Cat performed the song in a commercial for Pepsi to promote their "Soda Shop" line.

Reworked versions of the song are featured in Autumn 2023 and Spring 2024 commercials for British home furnishings retailer Dunelm.

== See also ==
- List of best-selling singles
- List of best-selling singles in France
- List of best-selling singles in the United Kingdom
- Grease: You're the One that I Want! – a reality game show where contestants competed to star on a Broadway-style revival of the musical
- List of Hot 100 number-one singles of 1978 (U.S.)
