= Les Mystères sanglants de l'OTS =

2006 TV documentary

- Title card
- Directed by: Yves Boisset
- Music by: Olivier Auriol
- Country of origin: France
- Original language: French

Production
- Producers: Serge Moati; Christilla Huillard-Kann; Yves Fortin; André Mailly
- Cinematography: Alain Dupras
- Editor: Julien Johan
- Running time: 66 minutes
- Production companies: Image et Compagnie; Productions Thalie

Original release
- Network: France 2
- Release: 2 February 2006

Les Mystères sanglants de l'OTS (lit. 'The Bloody Mysteries of the OTS') is a 2006 television documentary directed by Yves Boisset discussing the Order of the Solar Temple, a religious group notorious for the mass deaths of its many members in several mass murder-suicides throughout the 1990s. It first aired on the Infrarouge block on France 2 on 2 February 2006. The documentary features interviews with several former members and journalists who question the official narrative.

The film argues that the official narrative of the deaths (that it was mass murder-suicide perpetrated by the OTS) is false, and that there may have instead been a government coverup involving intelligence agencies. It puts forth the idea that the OTS had been implicated in a wide variety of French political scandals and argues connections with French politician Charles Pasqua and the assassination of Yann Piat. Critical reception to the documentary was mixed, with some commentators praising it for its clear overview of the history of the group, though several others called it conspiratorial and argued it did not provide adequate proof of its assertions.

== Background ==
The Order of the Solar Temple was a religious group active in several Francophone countries, notorious for the mass deaths of its many members, totaling 74 dead, in several mass murder-suicides throughout the 1990s. Among those killed were Joseph Di Mambro and Luc Jouret, the leaders of the group. The only person to ever go on trial for the deaths, Michel Tabachnik, was found innocent on all charges.

Yves Boisset was a French filmmaker known for his work on narrative films, though he is also the director of several documentaries on legal issues and crime cases like the Dreyfus affair, the Seznec affair, and Jean Moulin. Boisset decided to conduct an investigation into the case when he met the environmentalist Michel Pivert (who appears in the film); Pivert had previously conducted investigations into some real estate listings, which happened to be related to the OTS. Boisset viewed this lead, in addition to the financial aspects of the group, as being deliberately neglected by the official investigation.

He said what struck him about the case was the "lack of answers" and the various unsolved mysteries around the case. Interviewed by 24 hueres several months before the film's premiere, Boisset described the case of the OTS as "one of the strangest and most horrific crime stories known", and said that certain "gray areas" in the investigation had not yet been looked at. He believed that Di Mambro was really a small time crook with bigger people behind him "pulling the strings". He criticized the idea of it being a cult as the only element at play.

== Synopsis ==
The film begins with a summary of the OTS's history, first the two massacres in Switzerland, followed by the deaths in the Vercors the next year, then a mass suicide in Canada two years later, all members of the group who killed themselves or were murdered. Prosecution was quickly abandoned by Switzerland and Canada, as both leaders were dead; the French investigation prosecuted a single member, composer Michel Tabachnik, who was acquitted. The documentary then follows with a history of Di Mambro and Jouret's backgrounds, including Di Mambro's involvement in the Rosicrucian order AMORC.

Various people are interviewed for the documentary, including policemen, relatives of the victims, lawyers of the victims, a forensics expert, investigators on the case, and former members of the OTS. It puts forward the idea that the Swiss investigation into the 1994 deaths was botched, and that the presiding judge over the case (Piller) had acted to cover up state corruption by destroying the crime scene (the buildings where the mass suicides had occurred were destroyed on camera). It argues that the recovery of cassettes from the rubble by two France 2 journalists after the scene had been destroyed was evidence of a coverup by Piller acting on the orders of his superiors.

It asserts that two of the individuals who died in the 1995 massacre, Jean-Pierre Lardanchet and Patrick Rostan, worked for the Direction centrale des renseignements généraux (DCRG, a French intelligence agency), and that the fact that there were no fingerprints on the cars that brought the victims to the second Vercors massacre was a sign of an external coverup. The film also asserts that Di Mambro had ties to Charles Pasqua and the Service d'Action Civique, as well as the assassination of Yann Piat and the deaths of the Saincené brothers which he links to the OTS through a real estate interest. It brings up possible arms trafficking in Australia through large bank payments, and payments to right wing groups.

== Interviewees ==
- Serge Toussaint, grand master of AMORC
- Hermann Delorme, former member of the OTS
- Michel Tabachnik, conductor and former member of the OTS
- Maurice Fusier, a reporter for Radio France and France Info who wrote several books about the OTS that questioned the official narrative
- Martin Pelchat, journalist for La Presse
- Jean-Marie Bornet, spokesman for the Valais police
- Éric Lemasson, journalist and director
- André Romey, mayor of a town near one of the sites
- Alain Vuarnet, son of skier Jean Vuarnet and Edith Bonlieu, one of the victims
- Alain Leclerc, lawyer for some of the victims' families
- Gilbert Lavoué, forensic expert
- Pierre Tourangeau, Radio-Canada journalist
- Luc Fontaine, investigating judge

== Production and release ==
It was produced by Image et Compagnie in France and Productions Thalie in Canada. The production was co-financed by France 2. In making the film, Boisset stated that he did not want to recount the life of the group like other documentaries, but to go "beyond the version that suits everyone". The film interviews several people involved, including Tabachnik himself, as well as judges from both France and Switzerland. According to Boisset, Charles Pasqua declined to be interviewed, as did every Swiss magistrate involved in the case. In the creation of the film he met Raël, the leader of the Raëlian movement, another group called a cult; Boisset said he doubted that Raël would ever orchestrate such an event, but that he was a hedonist whose group could commit abuses.

Boisset stated that everything he presented in the interview was based on direct document or interview evidence, and whatever he could not prove would be removed by the production company and France 2 so that they would not be sued for defamation; three minutes of the film were removed in the final cut and the names of two political parties were censored. According to Boisset, when it was screened for France 2, four lawyers were in the room. More than fifty individuals were interviewed for the documentary, including several relatives of the victims and journalists who disagreed with the mass suicide theory. Boisset said that Judge Piller and several involved police officers declined to be interviewed.

Shortly before its release, another TV film, this one a docu-fiction, was released about the OTS for France 3; Les Mystères sanglants de l'OTS was described by its creators as having an approach both "different and complimentary" to that one. It first aired on the Infrarouge block (a documentary slot named for infrared light, "for what cannot be seen with the naked eye") on France 2 on 2 February 2006. It was later rebroadcast on Radio-Canada in 2008. Boisset said that at some after the making of the film, he received an anonymous phone call that told him "unpleasant things". During its promotion, he said he had no fears of later massacres, as no significant members were left alive.

Boisset, called as a witness by the civil parties, would later testify in court during the second trial of Michell Tabachnik in October 2006. He again stated that he believed the "politico-mafia" aspect of the case had been overlooked; he said Tabachnik was not involved in any of the alleged mafia elements of the group.

== Reception ==
Bruno Icher writing for Libération praised the documentary for managing to tell the story of the group, which he described as an "exceptional" case, in a manner that was chronologically understandable. He also praised it for straying away from the typical media response to the OTS, including copious usage of its own imagery, instead focusing on the investigation's shortcomings. Icher described the documentary as feeling slightly conspiratorial, though said it did not feel "far-fetched", and said the film put together "coincidences that may not be coincidences", though it ended without certainty. A review in the Belgian publication La Libre praised the film for managing to make a very complicated story clear and understandable, describing the film as "like a detective story except that it is about the sad reality."

Marianne Behar of L'Humanité said the film's thesis was "frightening" but with substance, noting its conclusion as laconic, showing that the "real beneficiaries of the OTS's cultic and lucrative delusions did not die", but that they had "slipped through the cracks of the legal system". The Swiss magazine TV8 called it a "solid, well-documented counter-investigation that leaves an unpleasant taste in the face of 'deaf, blind and mute' justice"; while the newspaper Le Matin called its conclusions "amply developed"; they further said that instead of its title, it should have been called "the mysteries of the bloody state crimes behind the dangerous OTS weirdos".

During the promotion of the 2023 documentary series La Fraternité, also about the Solar Temple, Blick said the theories presented in Les Mystères sanglants de l'OTS remained "unproven and speculative". Director Éric Lemasson (featured in this documentary) called the theories conspiracy theories, but said that many serious people believed in them. A review in Le Monde described the film as "willing to ask the awkward questions" but argued that it did not provide sufficient proof for its assertions. Describing the film as aiming to explore "gaps" in the original investigation, they noted that Boisset seemed to think that the true perpetrators of the massacre had not yet been brought to justice. They said that the film did not attempt to give answers as to the extent of Tabachnik's involvement which were left unanswered by the 2001 hearings. Le Parisien said the documentary did not provide answers to all of the questions it raised.

Arnaud Palisson, a former analyst at the DCRG who monitored cults, criticized the documentary's arguments and called the theories presented conspiracy theories. He argued that Boisset had been "swept aside by the prodigiously fallacious arguments of provincial journalists looking for their Watergate in the Vercors", and that the film's arguments played into what he viewed as cult apologism by denying that a cult was capable of such atrocities and was taken advantage of by lawyers who wished for media attention. He criticized several specific statements in the documentary, noting that the content of the recovered cassettes found in the chalets actually backed up the mass murder-suicide theory, and the proof of Lardanchet being an intelligence agent being nothing more than a note on Di Mambro's computer calling him a "mole" (which Palisson believed was merely an example of Di Mambro's paranoia). Palisson criticized the statement about the fingerprints as an urban legend, saying that due to the technology employed by the police at the time it was impossible for them to have taken fingerprints (as stated in a document by the Grenoble courts), as well as the supposed connection to SAC and the Saincené brothers as being based on dubious evidence.
