= Friedrich W. Bauschulte =

German actor (1923–2003)

Friedrich Wilhelm Bauschulte (17 March 1923 – 28 May 2003) was a German actor and voice-over actor.

In 1942, Bauschulte studied at the drama academy of the Deutsches Theater in Berlin. After engagements in Münster, Bremen and Wuppertal, in 1963 he received a permanent position with the Staatliche Schauspielbühnen Berlin, operators of the Schiller Theatre. In 1970 he was appointed a Staatsschauspieler in Berlin.

In addition to various roles in film and television, Bauschulte also worked extensively as a voice-over actor for German language media. His best known such role was as the voice of Lieutenant Mike Stone in the US TV series The Streets of San Francisco, played by Karl Malden. From then on he was Karl Malden's German voice in all his films. He also several times dubbed Sid James and Cyril Chamberlain in the Carry On films. Other dubbing roles included Richard Attenborough in Jurassic Park, Alec Guinness in Murder by Death (German title, Eine Leiche zum Dessert), Edward Platt in the television series Get Smart (German title, Mini-Max) and Barnard Hughes in the television series Mr. Merlin. The German-speaking children of the 1970s know his voice as that of Mr. Rossi in the German version of Il Signor Rossi cerca la felicità. He was one of the German voices of Ludwig von Drake, succeeding Horst Gentzen, before being replaced by Eberhard Prüter.

Bauschulte was heard from 1978 to 1999 as Professor van Dusen in the radio play series of that name on RIAS (later known as DeutschlandRadio Berlin). He also performed in numerous other radio plays, for example between 1959 and 1962 in three multi-part serials in the Paul Temple series on Westdeutscher Rundfunk and in 1978 as the narrator in Der liebe Herr Teufel.

He is buried in the Protestant cemetery in Nikolassee.

== Partial filmography ==
- 1960: Das Haus voller Rätsel
- 1977−1980: Ein verrücktes Paar (series)
- 1983: Spring Symphony
- 1986: Wanderungen durch die Mark Brandenburg
- 1990: Hotel Paradies (series)
- 1990: Wer zu spät kommt – Das Politbüro erlebt die deutsche Revolution
- 1994: Radetzkymarsch
