= Hildegard Krekel =

German actress (1952–2013)

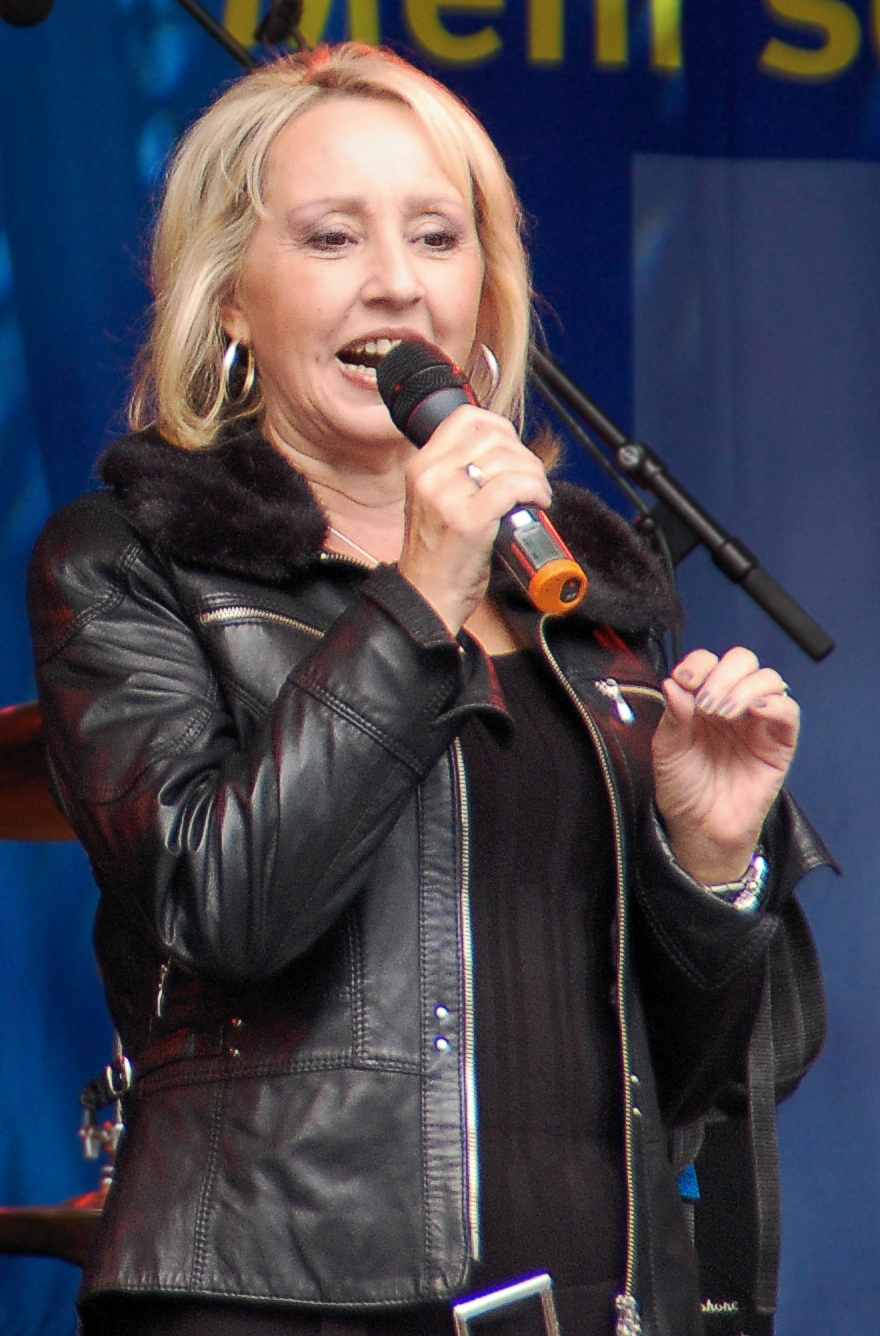
- Krekel in 2010
- Born: 2 June 1952; Cologne, West Germany
- Died: 26 May 2013 (aged 60); Cologne, Germany
- Occupation: Actress
- Years active: 1966–2013
- Known for: Ein Herz und eine Seele

Hildegard Krekel (2 June 1952 – 26 May 2013) was a German actress. She was best known for playing the role of Rita in the television series Ein Herz und eine Seele.

== Selected filmography ==
List of film and television appearances, with year, title, and role shown
| Year | Title | Role | Notes |
|---|---|---|---|
| 1973–76 | Ein Herz und eine Seele | Rita | 25 episodes |
| 1977 | Es muss nicht immer Kaviar sein | Carmen | 4 episodes |
| 1986 | Detektivbüro Roth | Irene | 14 episodes |
| 1986–90 | Janoschs Traumstunde | | 12 episodes – voice |
| 1987 | Hafendetektiv | | 6 episodes |
| 1991–94 | Unsere Hagenbecks | | 3 episodes |
| 1991–94 | Die Ketchup-Vampire | | 26 episodes |
| 1994–2004 | Evelyn Hamann's Geschichten aus dem Leben | Various characters | 16 episodes |
| 2006–07 | Was nicht passt, wird passend gemacht | Matta | 5 episodes |
| 2011–13 | Ein Fall für die Anrheiner | Uschi Schmitz | 3 episodes |
