= Abramakabra =

- Starring: Dieter Hallervorden
- Country of origin: West Germany

Original release
- Release: May 13, 1972 – December 1, 1976

Abramakabra is a West German comedy television series broadcast between 1972 and 1976. Many of the sketches were examples of black comedy.

== See also ==
- List of German television series
