= Ach du lieber Harry =

- Starring: Dieter Hallervorden; Iris Berben
- Release date: 1981
- Country: West Germany
- Language: German

Ach du lieber Harry is a 1981 German film directed by Jean Girault. It was released in 1981.
