= Didi – Der Untermieter =

- Starring: Dieter Hallervorden
- Country of origin: Germany

Didi – Der Untermieter is a German television series. ZDF initially broadcast the series under the name Die Nervensäge. However, the title had to be changed later due to a legal dispute. The show is based on the 1982 BBC series Goodbye, Mr Kent, which is adapted from the Broadway play The Odd Couple by Neil Simon.

== See also ==
- List of German television series
