= Stahlnetz =

German television series

- Created by: Jürgen Roland, Wolfgang Menge
- Country of origin: Germany
- No. of episodes: 28 episodes

Original release
- Network: ARD
- Release: 14 March 1958 – 14 March 1968

Stahlnetz was a German police procedural television series with many similarities to Dragnet running from 1958 to 1968, and from 1999 to 2003.

== See also ==
- Episodes Stahlnetz 1958-1968
- List of German television series
