= The Prize of Peril =

1958 short story by Robert Sheckley

Part of Store of Infinity The Prize of Peril
- Author: Robert Sheckley
- Language: English
- Series: Store of Infinity
- Genre: Dystopian fiction Science fiction
- Publisher: Bantam Books
- Publication date: 1960
- Publication place: United States
- Media type: Part of a short story collection

"The Prize of Peril" is a science fiction short story by Robert Sheckley. It was first published in The Magazine of Fantasy & Science Fiction in May 1958 and first collected in Store of Infinity in 1960 by Bantam Books. The short story is noted for its plot's anticipation of reality television shows such as Survivor and Fear Factor by several decades.

A 1982 novel by Stephen King, The Running Man, shares a similar premise and was itself adapted to film twice.

== Synopsis ==
The protagonist of the story is Jim Raeder, a man notable only for his normality, who has been a participant in many reality television shows (given the name "thrill shows") and thus become a celebrity. In all the shows the risk of dying has been a part of the concept; he has fought a real bull in Spain, he has driven a Formula 1 racecar and fought with other divers while trying to escape sharks and other sea predators. In the story he takes part in the greatest of all reality shows: he is to be hunted by professional gangland murderers.

As he is hunted, his journey is shown all over the US on TV and he receives help from viewers, the so-called Good Samaritans. The commentator, Mike Terry, makes a point of this during the show: "All of America is ready to help Jim!", but Raeder soon finds out that things are not what he expected them to be and that maybe his survival is not a main priority among the public. The story ends with Raeder winning "The Prize of Peril", but being dragged away after presumably having a mental breakdown, or merely "not being 'himself' at the moment," according to Terry.

== Adaptations ==
The story was adapted as a 1970 West German television film Das Millionenspiel and a 1983 French film, Le Prix du Danger.
