= Yves Boisset =

French film director and scriptwriter (1939–2025)

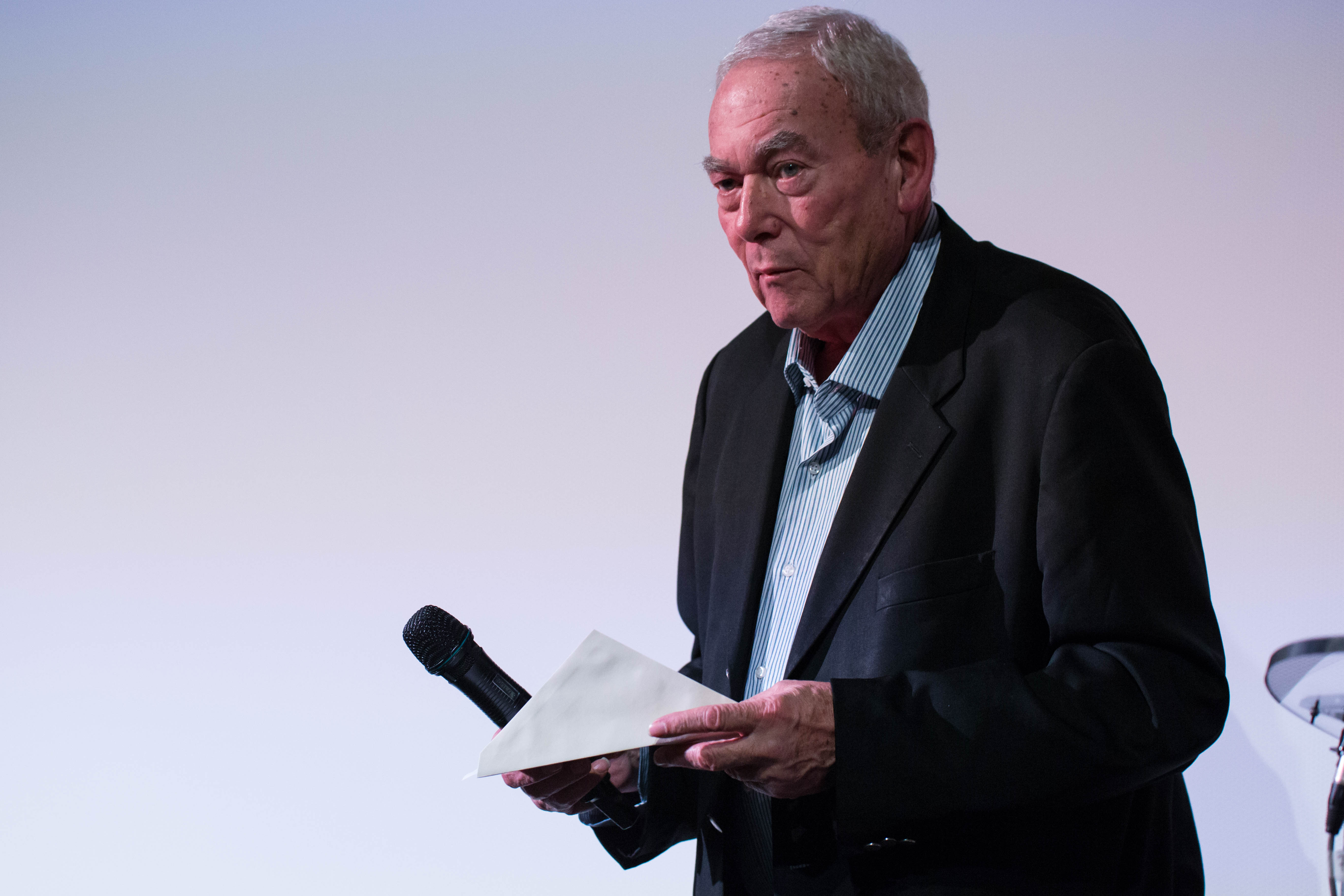
- Boisset in 2015
- Born: Yves Félix Claude Boisset; 14 March 1939; Paris, France
- Died: 31 March 2025 (aged 86); Levallois-Perret, France
- Occupations: Film director, screenwriter
- Years active: 1966–2025
- Notable work: The Assassination; The Common Man; Judge Fayard Called the Sheriff; The Purple Taxi; Le Prix du danger

Yves Félix Claude Boisset (French: [iv bwasɛ]; 14 March 1939 – 31 March 2025) was a French film director and screenwriter. He directed fiction films like The Assassination, Le prix du danger, as well as investigative documentaries. Boisset was known for his left wing political views and the controversial releases of his films. He was labeled "the most censored man in France", and declared himself the most censored filmmaker of the Fifth Republic.

== Early life ==
Yves Boisset was born 14 March 1939, in Paris, France. His parents were teachers, with his mother teaching the German language and his father teaching literature. Boisset was raised on a farm. When Boisset was 8, his younger brother died after overdosing on medication left out by his grandmother, leading to strife within his family. Boisset was educated at Lycée Louis-le-Grand and studied at the Institut des hautes études cinématographiques (IDHEC). He disliked the strict atmosphere of the school and left, not graduating. Boisset's first job was as a crime reporter for Paris-Jour in the late 1950s. He began writing for film magazines.

== Career ==
Boisset directed his first film in 1968, Coplan Saves His Skin. Many of his films focused on police, politics, and the criminal justice system. His films were known for their controversial releases, and he for his left-wing political views and legal and political issues. He was labeled "the most censored man in France", and declared himself the most censored filmmaker of the Fifth Republic. He was arrested multiple times in several different countries during the production of his films. His 1972 film about the Algerian war, R.A.S., led to violent threats against him was withdrawn from circulation. His 1972 film The Assassination entered into the 8th Moscow International Film Festival where it won the Silver Prize. He sued Arnold Schwarzenegger and 20th Century Fox over The Running Man, which he believed had plagiarized his film Le prix du danger. He won the lawsuit.

Boisset went on to direct several television films. He directed several investigative documentaries. In 2006, Boisset directed Les Mystères sanglants de l'OTS, a documentary on the Order of the Solar Temple, a French organization, widely described as a cult, notorious for their mass suicides and murders in the 1990s. Boisset found the official investigation unsatisfactory, and believed a wider conspiracy was at work.

In 2011, he published an autobiography, La vie est un choix (transl. Life is a Choice). He was afterwards sued for defamation due to the contents of the book.

== Death ==
Boisset died on 31 March 2025, at the age of 86. He had been in hospital care in Levallois-Perret for a few days.

== Filmography ==
=== As director ===
- 1966: Rouletabille (episode "Le parfum de la dame en noir") (TV series)
- 1968: Coplan Saves His Skin
- 1970: Cran d'arrêt
- 1970: The Cop
- 1971: Le Saut de l'ange
- 1972: The Assassination
- 1973: R.A.S.
- 1975: Folle à tuer
- 1975: The Common Man
- 1977: The Purple Taxi
- 1977: Judge Fayard Called the Sheriff
- 1978: La Clé sur la porte
- 1979: Histoires insolites (épisode "La stratégie du serpent") (TV)
- 1980: The Woman Cop
- 1981: Allons z'enfants
- 1982: Espion, lève-toi
- 1983: Le Prix du Danger
- 1984: Dog Day
- 1986: Bleu comme l'enfer
- 1987: La Fée carabine (TV)
- 1988: Médecins des hommes (TV series)
- 1988: La Travestie
- 1989: Le Suspect (TV)
- 1989: Radio Corbeau
- 1990: Frontière du crime (Double Identity) (TV)
- 1991: Les Carnassiers (TV)
- 1991: La Tribu
- 1993: L'Affaire Seznec (TV)
- 1993: Chute libre (TV)
- 1994: Morlock: Der Tunnel (TV)
- 1995: L'Affaire Dreyfus (TV)
- 1996: Les Amants de rivière rouge (TV series)
- 1997: La Fine équipe (TV)
- 1997: Une leçon particulière (TV)
- 1997: Le Pantalon (TV)
- 1999: Sam (TV)
- 2001: Les Redoutables (episode Poisson d'avril) (TV series)
- 2001: Dormir avec le diable (TV)
- 2001: Cazas (TV)
- 2002: Jean Moulin (TV)
- 2005: Ils veulent cloner le Christ (TV)
- 2006: Les Mystères sanglants de l'OTS (TV)
- 2007: La Bataille d'Alger (TV)
- 2009: L'Affaire Salengro (TV)

== Bibliography ==
- Boisset, Yves (2011). La vie est un choix [Life is a Choice] (in French). Paris: Plon. ISBN 978-2-259-21312-7.
