= The Wedding Trip (1969 film) =

1969 film

- Directed by: Ralf Gregan
- Written by: Curth Flatow; Horst Pillau
- Produced by: Artur Brauner; Nino Milano
- Starring: Liselotte Pulver; Dieter Hallervorden; Ewa Strömberg
- Cinematography: Richard Angst
- Edited by: Renate Engelmann
- Music by: Carlo Savina
- Production companies: CCC Film; Finarco
- Release date: 22 August 1969
- Running time: 87 minutes
- Countries: West Germany; Italy
- Language: German

The Wedding Trip (German: Die Hochzeitsreise) is a 1969 German-Italian comedy film directed by Ralf Gregan and starring Liselotte Pulver, Dieter Hallervorden and Ewa Strömberg.

== Synopsis ==
After seven years of marriage a German couple finally go on their honeymoon to Rome, but the trip is beset by problems.

== Cast ==
- Liselotte Pulver as Hannelore Schmidt
- Dieter Hallervorden as Lukas Andreas Martin Schmidt
- Ewa Strömberg as Kay
- Memmo Carotenuto as Arturo Santoni
- Alberto Farnese as Rossano Bertorelli
- Angelo Sorrentini as Galoppini
- Armando Carini as Hotelboy Pepino
- Dieter Hallervorden Jr. as Angelo Galoppini

== Bibliography ==
- Bock, Hans-Michael & Bergfelder, Tim. The Concise CineGraph. Encyclopedia of German Cinema. Berghahn Books, 2009.
