= Dieter Hallervorden =

German actor and comedian

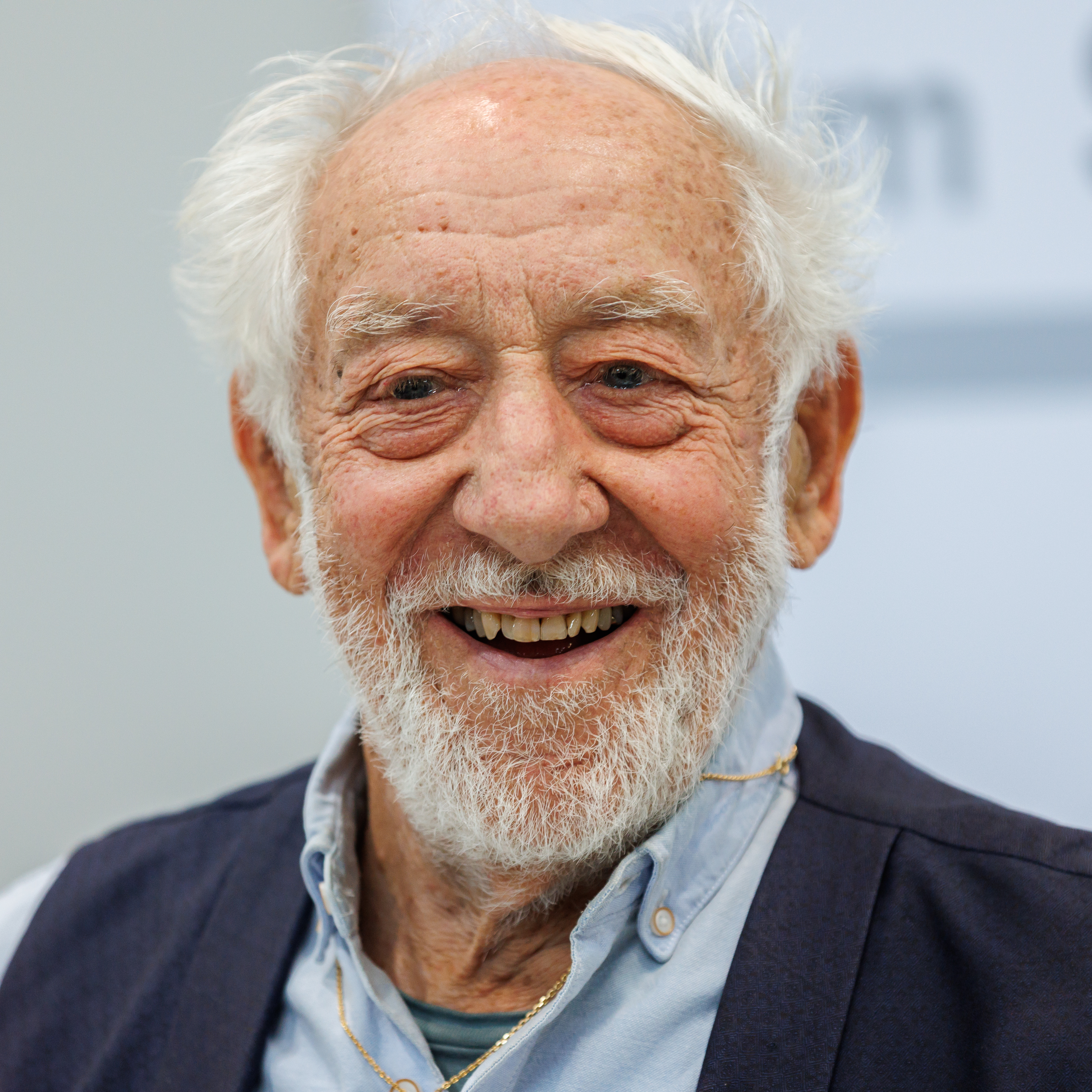
- Hallervorden in 2025
- Born: Dieter Jürgen Hallervorden; 5 September 1935 (age 90); Dessau, Germany
- Occupations: Actor, cabaret artist, comedian, singer
- Known for: Didi's Comedy Show

Signature
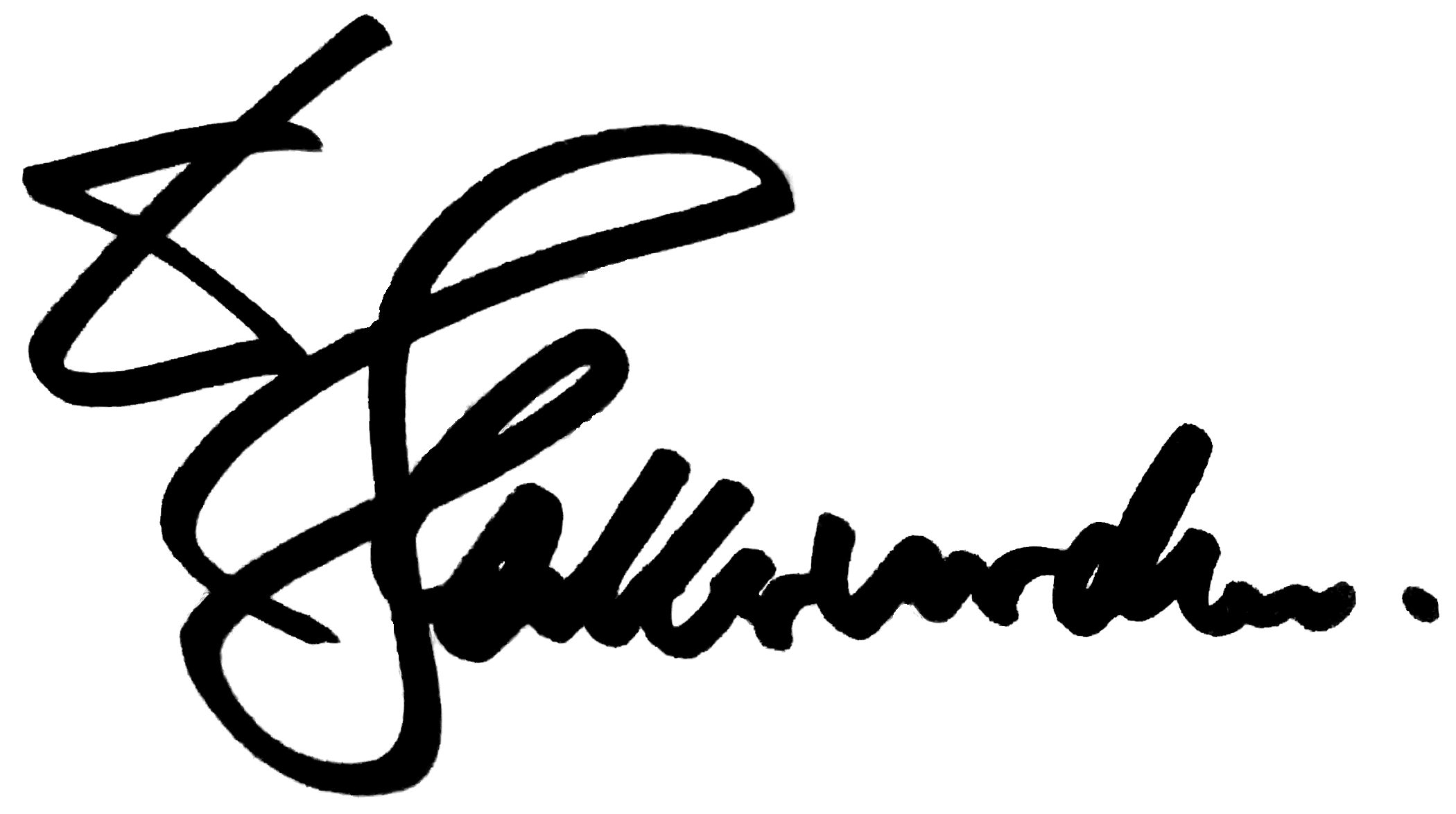

Dieter Hallervorden (born 5 September 1935) is a German actor, comedian, cabaret artist and singer. He achieved great popularity in German-speaking countries in the mid-1970s with the slapstick series Nonstop Nonsens and his character Didi.

In the early 2010s, he established himself as a character actor of serious roles in films such as Back on Track (2013) and Head Full of Honey (2014).

== Biography ==
Hallervorden's mother was a physician's assistant and his father a graduate engineer employed by German aircraft maker Junkers. His siblings are called Renate and Margot. He has two children (Dieter Hallervorden Jr. and Nathalie Hallervorden) from his marriage to Rotraud Schindler and a son (Johannes) from his second wife Elena Blume.

Dieter Hallervorden Jr. appeared in the movies Darf ich Sie zur Mutter machen (1968) and The Wedding Trip (1969) and was creator, co-writer and leading actor of the comedy show Nonstop Nonsens (1974–1980). Nathalie Hallervorden co-starred in the TV series Die Nervensäge (1985–1986) and had a brief appearance together with her parents in Nonstop Nonsens. Hallervorden's first wife, Rotraud Schindler, co-starred in several TV shows and some movies. Johannes Hallervorden plays the part of Melchior von und zu Panke, the ghost from the TV series Binny and the Ghost.

Hallervorden starred as a bumbling, Clouseau-like detective in the German television show Die Didi-Show. The show was dubbed into English, retitled Didi's Comedy Show, and shown in various countries. Hallervorden also released a number of music singles, often parodies of popular songs, among them "Du, die Wanne ist voll", a very successful parody cover of "You're the One That I Want".

An Afrikaans-subtitled version of the comedy sketch-show, Nonstop Nonsens (1975), starring Hallervorden, was broadcast in South Africa in the early 1980s under the title Grapjas Didi ("Didi the Joker" or alternatively "Didi the Prankster"). Also a Spanish-dubbed version was distributed for Latin America under the name Las Locuras de Didí ("The Madnesses of Didi").

Dieter Hallervorden also played the lead role in the film Didi - Der Doppelgänger (international title: "Non-Stop Trouble with My Double"), which was released in 1984. He also served as a screenwriter in this German 'comedy of mistaken identity', which made Hallervorden even more popular.

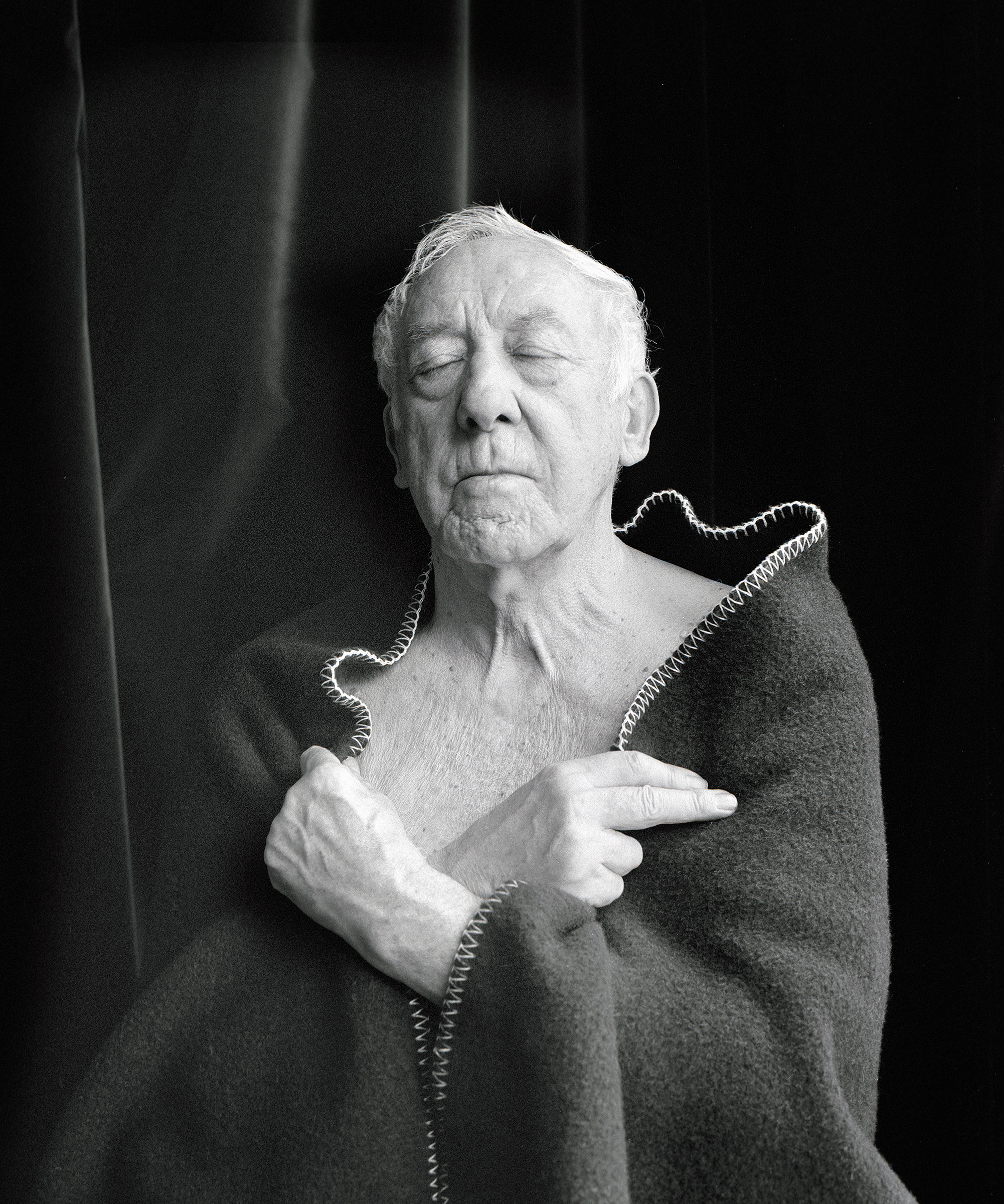
Hallervorden in Berlin, 2013

In recent years, Hallervorden was popular with the leading roles in the comedy-drama films Back on Track and Head Full of Honey. He provided the voice for Vlad in the German dub of Hotel Transylvania 2.

He lives alternately in Berlin and in Trégastel (France) in the castle Château de Costaérès, which he acquired in 1988. In 2007 he was announced as an honorary citizen of his birthtown Dessau-Roßlau. On 4 September 2022 he opened the "Mitteldeutsches Theater" in Dessau-Roßlau. The theater showcases Hallervorden's own productions as well as guest performances and readings by German artists, comedians and actors.

== Filmography ==
Date	Film	International Title
2019	Mein Freund, das Ekel	Befriending the Grouch
2017	Rock My Heart – Mein wildes Herz	Rock My Heart
2015	Chuzpe – Klops braucht der Mensch!	You Gotta Have Balls
2014	Honig im Kopf	Head Full of Honey
2013	Sein letztes Rennen	Back on Track
2012	Het meisje en de dood	The Girl and Death
2012	Das Kind	The Child
2011	Die zertanzten Schuhe	The Twelve Dancing Princesses
2008	1½ Ritter – Auf der Suche nach der hinreißenden Herzelinde	1½ Knights: In Search of the Ravishing Princess Herzelinde
2006	La Isla Bonita – Armee der Stille	La Isla Bonita
1992	Alles Lüge	All Lies
1990	Bei mir liegen Sie richtig	Non-Stop Trouble in the Hospital
1988	Didi – Der Experte	Non-Stop Trouble with the Experts
1986	Didi auf vollen Touren	Didi Drives Me Crazy
1985	Didi und die Rache der Enterbten	Non-Stop Trouble with the Family
1984	Is was, Kanzler? (Cameo)	What's Up, Chancellor?
1984	Didi – Der Doppelgänger	Non-Stop Trouble with My Double
1983	Der Schnüffler	Non-Stop Trouble with Spies
1981	Alles im Eimer	Up the Creek
1981	Stachel im Fleisch (Cameo)	Sting in the Flesh
1981	Ach du lieber Harry	Oh My Dearest Harry
1980	Mein Gott, Willi!	My God, Willi!
1974	Der Springteufel	The Devil's Jump
1972	Che?	What?
1973	Mein Onkel Benjamin	My Uncle Benjamin
1972	Tatort: Rattennest	Rat's Nest
1971	Mister Tingling stellt ein	Mister Tingling Is Hiring
1970	Das Millionenspiel	The Millions Game
1969	Die Hochzeitsreise	The Wedding Trip
1968	Mehrmals täglich	Several Times Daily
1967	Seltsame Begegnungen (short)	Strange Encounters (short)
1960	Die 1000 Augen des Dr. Mabuse	The Thousand Eyes of Dr. Mabuse

== TV shows ==
2024	Queen of Tears	Sanssouci Park groundskeeper (episode 6)
2020	The Masked Singer	Chamäleon (Season 2)
2004	Sesamstraße	Sesamstraße is the German equivalent to Sesame Street; Dieter Hallervorden had a guest role as Karl Kaputt.
2000–2001	Zebralla!	Hallervorden plays Jürgen Zebralla, an old divorced pensioner, who attends a university and lives with his wealthy son because of lack of money. Sitcom, 11 Episodes.
1996–1997	Verstehen Sie Spaß?	Hallervorden was the host of this show about pranks.
1994–2003	Hallervordens Spott-Light	Cabaret
1993	Sachen zum Lachen	Staged comic acts.
1993	Klipp-Klapp, der Clip Club	Hallervorden hosted the show
1992–1993	Spottschau	Cabaret
1985	Die Didi-Show	Short comic clips and comic acts. Also titled Didi's Comedy Show in English. 10 Episodes
1987	Laus im Pelz	A televised stage play.
1985–1986	Die Nervensäge aka. Der Untermieter	TV series, 26 Episodes
1983–1984	Zelleriesalat und Gitterspeise	TV show equivalent to Die Didi-Show with Hallervorden as a convict. 4 Episodes
1983	Wunderland	
1982	Grand Gala – 3 mal klingeln	Hallervorden was a host. 6 Episodes
1982	Welle Wahnsinn	Music show, 2 Episodes
1981	Onkel & Co	Hallervorden was a clumsy detective. 2 Episodes, 60 minutes each.
1975–1978	Lästerlexikon	3 Episodes
1974–1980	Nonstop Nonsens	Well-known slapstick show. 20 Episodes
1973	Kara Ben Nemsi Effendi	TV series based on the Karl May books. 26 Episodes
1972	Vorsicht! – Stellenweise tief	Satire
1970–1976	Abramakabra	TV series, 10 Episodes
1971	Von Liebe keine Rede	
1971	Hei-Wi-Tip-Top	
1970–1974	Die Kriminalerzählung	26 Episodes
1970	Ti vor Tu	
1961–1962	Die Rückblende	

== Awards ==
- 1981: Bambi (for his role in Nonstop Nonsens)
- 1996: Telestar (Best Host in "Verstehen Sie Spaß?")
- 2003: Deutscher Comedypreis (Honorary Award)
- 2005: Bayerischer Kabarettpreis (Honorary Award)
- 2006: Honorary citizen of the German city Dessau
- 2013: Goldene Kamera (for his lifework, Honorary Award)
