= Robert Sheckley short stories bibliography =

This article presents an incomplete list of short stories by Robert Sheckley, arranged alphabetically by title.

== Short stories ==
- "A Strange but Familiar Country" (2002, BIGNews (also on Internet) 2002/9)
- "A Supplicant in Space" (1973, The Robot Who Looked Like Me)
- "A Thief in Time" (1954, Citizen in Space)
- "A Ticket to Tranai" (1955, Citizen in Space)
- "A Trick Worth Two of That" (2001, Uncanny Tales)
- "A Wind Is Rising" (1957, Notions: Unlimited)
- "An Infinity of Angels" (2001, Official Angel Website (Internet))
- "Accept No Substitutes" (1958, Infinity SF 1958/3)
- "Agamemnon's Run" (2002, Uncanny Tales)
- "Alien Starswarm" (1990?, Portland, OR: DimeNovels 1990)
- "Aliens: Alien Harvest" (1995?, Bantam Spectra 1995) - see Aliens (novel series)
- "All the Things You Are" (1956, Pilgrimage to Earth)
- "Alone at Last" (1957, Shards of Space)
- "Amsterdam Diary" (1989?, Semiotext(e) #14 1989)
- "Ask a Foolish Question" (1953, Citizen in Space)
- "Aspects of Langranak" (Can You Feel Anything When I Do This?)
- "At the Conference of Birds" (1987, The Collected Short Stories of Robert Sheckley Book Five)
- "Bad Medicine" (1956, Pilgrimage to Earth)
- "Beetle" (2003, BIGNews (also on Internet) 2003/9)
- "Beside Still Waters" (1953, Untouched by Human Hands)
- "Body Game" (1978, Omni Dec 1978)
- "Breakout" (1990?, The War Years #2: The Siege of Arista, ed. Bill Fawcett, Penguin/Roc 1990)
- "Budget Planet" (1968, F&SF Mar 1968)
- "Can You Feel Anything When I Do This?" (1969, Can You Feel Anything When I Do This?)
- "Carhunters of the Concrete Prairie" (1989?, Foundation's Friends, ed. Martin H. Greenberg, Tor 1989)
- "Carrier" (1954?, If Apr 1954)
- "Celestial Visitations" (1980, Omni Nov 1980)
- "Citizen in Space" (1955, Citizen in Space. Also known as "Spy Story")
- "Change from a Silver Dollar" (1954, The Saint Detective Magazine 1954/12)
- "Charter for Murder" (1958, Short Stories (UK) 1958/12)
- "Closed Circuit" (1953, Science Fiction Adventures 1953/9)
- "Coast to Coast" (1953, Collier's 1953/7)
- "Conquerors Planet" (1954, Fantastic Universe 1954/10)
- "A Conversation with the West Nile Virus" (2002, BIGNews (also on Internet) 2002/12 and 2003/1)
- "Conversations on Mars" (2004, BIGNews (also on Internet) 2004/7)
- "Conversation on Mars" (2005, Amazing 2005/3)
- "Cordle to Onion to Carrot" (1969, Can You Feel Anything When I Do This?)
- "Cornfield" (2002, BIGNews (also on Internet) 2002/11)
- "Cost of Living" (1952, Untouched by Human Hands)
- "Dawn Invader" (1957, Notions: Unlimited)
- "Deadhead Deadhead" (1955, Pilgrimage to Earth)
- "Death of the Dreammaster" (1989, The Further Adventures of Batman, ed. Martin H. Greenberg, 1989)
- "Death Freaks" (1989, Prophets in Hell, ed. Janet Morris, Baen 1989. Also known as "Heroes in Hell")
- "Death Wish" (1956, Galaxy 1956/6 as Ned Lang)
- "Deep Blue Sleep" (1999, Uncanny Tales)
- "Devildeal" (1994?, Deals with the Devil, ed. Mike Resnick, Martin H. Greenberg & Loren D. Estleman, DAW 1994)
- "Diaghilev Plays Riverworld" (1993?, Quest to Riverworld, ed. Philip José Farmer, Warner Questar 1993)
- "Dial-a-Death" (1987, The Collected Short Stories of Robert Sheckley Book Five)
- "Diplomatic Immunity" (1953, The People Trap)
- "Disposal Service" (1955, Pilgrimage to Earth)
- "Disquisitions on the Dinosaur" (1993, Dinosaur Fantastic, ed. Mike Resnick & Martin H. Greenberg, DAW 1993)
- "Divine Intervention" (1989, The Collected Short Stories of Robert Sheckley Book Five)
- "Doctor Zombie and His Little Furry Friends" (Can You Feel Anything When I Do This?)
- "Double Indemnity" (1957, Notions: Unlimited)
- "Down the Digestive Tract and into the Cosmos with Mantra, Tantra and Specklebang" (1971, Can You Feel Anything When I Do This?)
- "Dreamworld" (1968, The People Trap. Revised from "The Petrified World")
- "Dukakis and the Aliens" (1992, Uncanny Tales, Alternate Presidents)
- "Duplication" (1959?, Playboy May 1959)
- "Early Model" (1956, Pilgrimage to Earth)
- "Earth, Air, Fire and Water" (1955, Pilgrimage to Earth)
- "Eastern Exposures" (1981?, Omni Feb 1981)
- "Emissary from a Green and Yellow World" (1998, Uncanny Tales)
- "End City" (1974, The Robot Who Looked Like Me. Two versions exist, with different endings.)
- "Fear in the Night" (1952, Pilgrimage to Earth)

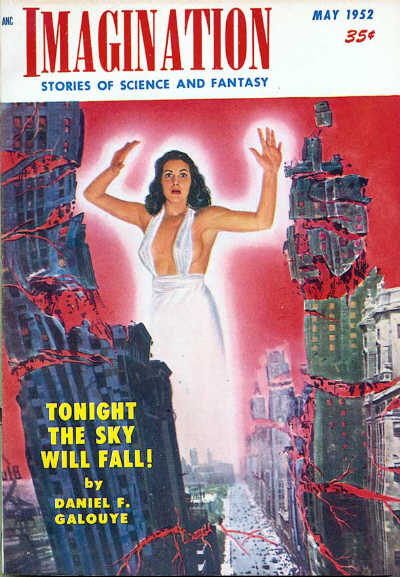
Sheckley's first story, "Final Examination", was published in the May 1952 issue of Imagination

- "Feeding Time" (1953, Notions: Unlimited)
- "Final Examination" (1952, Imagination 1952/5)
- "Fishing Season" (1953, The People Trap)
- "Five Minutes Early" (1982, Is THAT What People Do?)
- "Fool's Mate" (1953, Shards of Space)
- "Forever" (1959, Shards of Space)
- "Fortunate Person" – see "The Luckiest Man in the World"
- "Game: First Schematic" (1971?, Can You Feel Anything When I Do This?)
- "George and the Boxes" (1995, Never published in English, first published in Polish; Russian translation published in Новые Миры Роберта Шекли, Vol. 2. Полярис, 1998)
- "Ghost V" (1954, The People Trap)
- "Good-Bye Forever to Mr. Pain" (1979, Is THAT What People Do?)
- "Gray Flannel Armor" (1957, Notions: Unlimited)
- "Hands Off" (1954, Citizen in Space)
- "Heroes in Hell" – see "Death Freaks"
- "Hex on Hax" (1954, Planet Stories 1954/9 (Fall Issue))
- "Holdout" (1957, Notions: Unlimited)
- "How to Write Science Fiction" (1982?, Transmutations, Alexei Panshin, Elephant 1982)
- "Human Man's Burden" (1956, Pilgrimage to Earth)
- "Hunger" (2003, Stars: Original Stories Based on the Songs of Janis Ian ed. Janis Ian & Mike Resnick)
- "Hunting Problem" (1955, Citizen in Space)
- "I Can Teleport Myself to Anywhere" (1979?, Twenty Houses of the Zodiac, ed. Maxim Jakubowski, 1979)
- "I See a Man Sitting on a Chair, and the Chair Is Biting His Leg" (1968, The Robot Who Looked Like Me. Collaboration with Harlan Ellison)
- "If the Red Slayer" (1959, Amazing Jul 1959; Store of Infinity)
- "In a Land of Clear Colors" (1976, New Constellations, ed. Thomas M. Disch & Charles Naylor, Harper 1976)
- "Is THAT What People Do?" (1978, The Robot Who Looked Like Me)
- "Join Now" – see "The Humours"
- "Judication" (1959?, Playboy May 1959)
- "Juleeeeeeeeeeen!" (1986, Twilight Zone Oct 1986). Collaboration with Jay Rothbell Sheckley)
- "Keep Your Shape" – see "Shape"
- "Kenny" (1999, The Magazine of Fantasy and SF, 1999/10)
- "Khasara" (1989?, The Break Through, ed. David Drake & Bill Fawcett, Ace 1989) - for David Drake's Fleet series
- "Klaxon" (1988, The Fleet, ed. David Drake & Bill Fawcett, Ace 1988) - for David Drake's Fleet series
- "Legend of Conquistadors" (2003, The Magazine of Fantasy and SF 2003/4)
- "Love, Inc." – see "Pilgrimage to Earth"
- "Love Song from the Stars" (1989, Weird Tales Win 1989/90)
- "Lubrication" (1959?, Playboy May 1959)
- "M Molecule" – see "Specialist"
- "Magic, Maples, and Maryanne" (2000, Uncanny Tales)
- "Man of the Hour" (1954, Science Fiction Digest 1954/5 issue 2 of 2)
- "Mayhem Party" (1996?, The Ultimate Super-Villains, ed. Stan Lee, Boulevard 1996)
- "Meanwhile, Back at the Bromide" (1962, Is THAT What People Do?)
- "Meeting of the Minds" (1960, Shards of Space)
- "Memoir" (1986?, Worlds of If: A Retrospective Anthology, ed. Frederik Pohl, Martin H. Greenberg & Joseph D. Olander, Bluejay 1986)
- "Message from Hell" (1988, Weird Tales Winter 1988-89)
- "Message from Pluto" (2003, BIGNews (also on Internet) 2003/5)
- "Milk Run" (1954, Pilgrimage to Earth)
- "Minority Group" (1954, Fantastic Universe 1954/11)
- "Minotaur Maze" (1990?, Axolotl Press: Eugene, OR 1990)
- "Miranda" (1994?, Alternate Outlaws, ed. Mike Resnick, Tor 1994)
- "Mirror Games" (2001, Uncanny Tales)
- "Miss Mouse and the Fourth Dimension" (1982, Is THAT What People Do?)
- "Morning After" (1957, Notions: Unlimited)
- "Mrs. Donaldson's Puzzling Dream" (1957, Swank 1957/5)
- "My Trip to Mars" (2004, BIGNews (also on Internet) 2004/1)
- "Myryx" (1983?, Isaac's Universe Volume One: The Diplomacy Guild, ed. Martin H. Greenberg, Avon 1990)
- "A New Christmas Carol" (1993, Christmas Forever, ed. David G. Hartwell, Tor 1993)
- "The New Horla" (2000, F&SF, June 2000, 89/1 : 38-49)
- "Notes on the Perception of Imaginary Differences" (Can You Feel Anything When I Do This?)
- "Off-Limits Planet" (1954, Imagination 1954/5)
- "On Three Cigars" (2000, "Civil War Fantastic" ed. Greenberg 2000/7)
- " "One Man's Poison" (1953, Galaxy 1953/12)
- "Onesday" (1991, Pulphouse: The Hardback Magazine Issue 10, ed. Kristine Kathryn Rusch, Pulphouse 1991)
- "Operating Instructions" (1953, Astounding 1953/5, later in Beyond the Barriers of Time and Space anthology, ed. Merril, 1954)
- "Pandora's Box – Open with Care" (2000, Uncanny Tales, F&SF 99/3)
- "Paradise II" (1954, Notions: Unlimited)
- "Pas de Trois of the Chef and the Waiter and the Customer" (1971, Can You Feel Anything When I Do This?)
- "Pilgrimage to Earth" (1956, Pilgrimage to Earth. Also known as "Love, Inc.")
- "Plague Circuit" (Can You Feel Anything When I Do This?)
- "A Plague of Unicorns" (1995, Peter S. Beagle's Immortal Unicorn, Vol. 2, co-edited with Peter S. Beagle; with help from Martin H. Greenberg. HarperPrism, Hardcover, October 1995)
- "Potential" (1953, Shards of Space)
- "Primordial Follies" (1998, Ma che Pianeta mi hai Fatto?, only published in translation to Italian)
- "Privilege of Age" (2003, BIGNews (also on Internet) 2003/3)
- "Proof of the Pudding" (1952, The People Trap)
- "Prospector's Special" (1959, Shards of Space)
- "Protection" (1956, Pilgrimage to Earth)
- "Reborn Again" (2005, Imagination 2005/1 (?))
- "Redfern's Labyrinth" (The People Trap)
- "Restricted Area" (1953, The People Trap)
- "Ritual" (1953, Untouched by Human Hands. Also known as "Strange Ritual")
- "Robotgnomics" (1984?, Omni Dec 1984)
- "Robotvendor Rex" (1985, Omni Feb 1986)
- "Sarkanger" (1982? 1986?, Stardate Jan/Feb 1986)
- "Scenes from the Contest" (2005, "You Bet Your Planet" ed. Greenberg & Koren)
- "Seventh Victim" (1953, Untouched by Human Hands)
- "Seven Soup Rivers" (1995, Galaxy Jan/Feb 1995 (Issue 7))
- "Shall We Have a Little Talk?" (1965, The People Trap)
- "Shape" (1953, Untouched by Human Hands. Also known as "Keep Your Shape")
- "She Was Made for Love" (1959, Knave 1959/1 (Issue 1))
- "Shoes" (2002, The Magazine of Fantasy and SF 2002/2, also in "Mammoth Book of New Comic Fantasy" (2005) ed. Ashley, Carroll & Graf)
- "Sightseeing, 2179" (2002, Uncanny Tales)
- "Silversmith Wishes" (1977, The Robot Who Looked Like Me)
- "Simul City" (1990?, Time Gate Vol. 2: Dangerous Interfaces, ed. Robert Silverberg, Baen 1990)
- "Skulking Permit" (1954, Citizen in Space)
- "Slaves of Time" (1974, The Robot Who Looked Like Me)
- "Sneak Previews" (1977, The Robot Who Looked Like Me)
- "Something for Nothing" (1954, Citizen in Space)
- "Spacemen in the Dark" (1953, Climax 1953/4)
- "Specialist" (1953, Untouched by Human Hands. Also known as "M Molecule")
- "Spectator Playoffs" (1987, Night Cry Spr 1987. Collaboration with Jay Rothbell Sheckley)
- "A Spirit of Place" (2004, Microcosms ed. Gregory Benford)
- "Spy Story" – see "Citizen in Space"
- "Squirrel Cage" (1955, Galaxy 1955/)
- "Starting from Scratch" (1970, Can You Feel Anything When I Do This?)
- "Strange Ritual" – see "Ritual"
- "Street of Dreams, Feet of Clay" (1967, Galaxy 1968/2, later reworked into a segment of Dimension of Miracles)
- "Subsistence Level" (1954, Shards of Space)
- "Svengali in Westchester" (1959, Argosy 1959/12)
- "Syncope and Fugue" (1975, Galaxy 1975/7)
- "Tailpipe to Disaster" (Can You Feel Anything When I Do This?)
- "The Academy" (IF, August 1954. Pilgrimage to Earth)
- "The Accountant" (1954, Citizen in Space)
- "The Altar" (1953, Untouched by Human Hands)
- "The Battle" (1954, Citizen in Space)
- "The Body" (1956, Pilgrimage to Earth)
- "The City of the Dead" (1994, Uncanny Tales, originally in Galaxy), three parts:
  - "City of the Dead"
  - "Weather Sirens"
  - "Perseus"
- "The Covenant" (1960, Fantastic SF 1960/7. A round-robin novelette with Anderson, Asimov, Bloch and Leinster)
- "The Cruel Equations" (1971?, BOAC 1971; Can You Feel Anything When I Do This?)
- "The Day the Aliens Came" (1995, New Legends, ed. Greg Bear & Martin H. Greenberg, Legend 1995; Uncanny Tales)
- "The Deaths of Ben Baxter" (Store of Infinity)
- "The Deep Hole to China" (1955, Fantastic Universe 1955/6)
- "The Demons" (1953, Untouched by Human Hands)
- "The Destruction of Atlantis" (1989, The Collected Short Stories of Robert Sheckley Book Five. Also known as "The Truth About Atlantis")
- "The Disorder and Early Sorrow of Edward Moore Kennedy, Homunculus" (1992, Alternate Kennedys, ed. Mike Resnick, Tor 1992)
- "The Dream of Misunderstanding" (2002, Uncanny Tales)
- "The Dream Country" (The Crafters Book 2, ed. Christopher Stasheff & Bill Fawcett, Ace 1992)
- "The Eryx" (1998?, Lord of the Fantastic: Stories in Honor of Roger Zelazny, ed. Martin H. Greenberg, Avon Eos 1998)
- "The Eye of Reality" (1982, Omni Oct 1982)
- "The Forest on the Asteroid" (2004, The Magazine of Fantasy and SF 2004/4)
- "The Future of Sex: Speculative Journalism" (1982, Is THAT What People Do?)
- "The Future Lost" (1980, Is THAT What People Do?)
- "The Girls and Nugent Miller" (1960, Shards of Space)
- "The Gun Without a Bang" (Store of Infinity)
- "The Helping Hand" (1981, Is THAT What People Do?)
- "The Homecoming" (1989?, Buck Rogers: Arrival, ed. Anon., TSR 1989) - see Buck Rogers
- "The Hour of Battle" (Space Science Fiction Sep 1953)
- "The Humours" (Store of Infinity. Also known as "The Humors" and "Join Now")
- "The Hungry" (1954, Fantastic SF 1954/6. Revised version published in Fantastic Science Fiction 1969/8)
- "The Impacted Man" (1952, Untouched by Human Hands)
- "The Joker's War" (1990, The Further Adventures of The Joker)
- "The King's Wishes" (1953, Untouched by Human Hands)
- "The Language of Love" (1957, Notions: Unlimited)
- "The Last Days of (Parallel?) Earth" (1980, Is THAT What People Do?)
- "The Last Weapon" (1953, The People Trap)
- "The Last Word" (1985?, Omni Feb 1985)
- "The Laxian Key" (1954, The People Trap)
- "The Leech" (1952, Notions: Unlimited)
- "The Life of Anybody" (1984, Is THAT What People Do?)
- "The Lifeboat Mutiny" (1955, Pilgrimage to Earth)
- "The Luckiest Man in the World" (1955, Citizen in Space. Also known as "Fortunate Person")
- "The Machine" (1957, Fantastic Universe 1957/7)
- "The Martyr" (1957, Galaxy 1957/2)
- "The Mind-Slaves of Manitori" (1989, Uncanny Tales)
- "The Minimum Man" (Store of Infinity)
- "The Mnemone" (Can You Feel Anything When I Do This?)
- "The Mob" (1956, Infinity SF 1956/6)
- "The Monsters" (1953, Untouched by Human Hands)
- "The Mountain Without a Name" (1955, Citizen in Space)
- "The Native Problem" (1956, Notions: Unlimited)
- "The Necessary Thing" (1955, The People Trap)
- "The Never-Ending Western Movie" (1976, The Robot Who Looked Like Me)
- "The New Horla" (2000, Uncanny Tales)
- "The Obsidian Mirror" (2002, BIGNews (also on Internet) 2002/10)
- "The Odor of Thought" (1953, The People Trap)
- "The Ogre Test" (1954, Planet Stories 1954/7 (Summer Issue))
- "The Old Curiosity Shop" (2004, BIGNews (also on Internet) 2004/9)
- "The Other Mars" (1991, The Bradbury Chronicles, ed. William F. Nolan & Martin H. Greenberg, Roc 1991)
- "The Paris-Ganymede Clock" (2005, "Tales of the Shadowmen, Vol 1" ed. Lofficier)
- "The People Trap" (1968, The People Trap)
- "The Perfect Woman" (1953?, Amazing Dec 1953/Jan 54)
- "The Petrified World" (1968, Can You Feel Anything When I Do This?)
- "The Prize of Peril" (Store of Infinity)
- "The Quijote Robot" (2001, Uncanny Tales)
- "The Rabbi from Perdido" (1990, "Crazed World Construct")
- "The Refuge Elsewhere" (2003, The Magazine of Fantasy and SF 2003/5)
- "The Resurrection Machine" (1989, Time Gate, ed. Robert Silverberg, Baen 1989) - for Time Gate
- "The Robot Who Looked like Me" (1973, The Robot Who Looked Like Me)
- "The Robotic Replacement of George" (1987, origin unknown. Collaboration with Jay Rothbell Sheckley)
- "The Same to You Doubled" (1970, Can You Feel Anything When I Do This?)
- "The Scheherezade Machine" (1991, published in Pulphouse issues: Jun 1, Jul 6, Jul 27, Aug 17, Sep 20, Oct 25, Nov 29, Dec 31, all 1991)
- "The Seal of Solomon" (1991?, The Crafters, ed. Christopher Stasheff & Bill Fawcett, Ace 1991)
- "The Shaggy Average American Man Story" (1979, Is THAT What People Do?)
- "The Shootout in the Toy Shop" (1981, Is THAT What People Do?)
- "The Skag Castle" (1956, Is THAT What People Do?)
- "The Slow Season" (1954, Shards of Space)
- "The Special Exhibit" (1953, Shards of Space)
- "The Stand on Luminos" (1992?, Battlestation Book One, ed. David Drake and Bill Fawcett, Ace 1992) - for David Drake's Fleet series
- "The Store of the Worlds" (Store of Infinity. Also known as "World of Heart's Desire")
- "The Swamp" (1981, Is THAT What People Do?)
- "The Sweeper of Loray" (1959, Shards of Space)
- "The Sympathetic Doctor" (2003, BIGNews (also on Internet) 2003/7)
- "The Tales of Zanthias" (2003, Weird Tales 2003/7)
- "The Truth About Atlantis" – see "The Destruction of Atlantis"
- "The Two Sheckleys" (2005, "Gateways" ed. Greenberg)
- "The Universal Karmic Clearing House" (1986, Uncanny Tales)
- "The Victim from Space" (1947, The People Trap)
- "There Will Be No War After This One" (1987, There Won't Be War, ed. Harry Harrison & Bruce McAllister, Tor 1991)
- "Three Cautionary Tales" (1981, Rod Serling's The Twilight Zone Magazine, April 1981), in three parts:
  - "The Helping Hand"
  - "The Man Who Loved"
  - "The Wish"
- "Time Check for Control" (1953, Climax 1953/3. Revised version in Science Fiction Digest 1954/2)
- "Traitors' Saga" (1988, The Fleet: Counterattack, ed. David Drake & Bill Fawcett, Ace 1988) - for David Drake's Fleet series
- "Trap" (1956, Pilgrimage to Earth)
- "Triplication" (1959?, Playboy May 1959, Store of Infinity), in three short parts:
  - "Judication"
  - "Duplication"
  - "Lubrication"
- "Tripout" (Can You Feel Anything When I Do This?)
- "Trojan Hearse" (1990, "The War Years #1: The Far Stars War" ed. Fawcett)
- "Ultimatum!" (1953, Future SF 1953/11)
- "Uncle Tom's Planet" (1954, Galaxy 1954/12)
- "Untouched by Human Hands" (1953, Astounding Science Fiction May 1953; reprinted in Untouched by Human Hands)
- "Vacation on Earth" (1983, Omni 1983/2)
- "Visions of the Green Moon" (1999, "Moon Shots" ed. Crowther & Greenberg, 1999)
- "Voices" (1973, The Robot Who Looked Like Me)
- "Warm" (1953, Untouched by Human Hands)
- "Warrior Race" (1952, Galaxy 1952/11 UK Vol:3 #3)
- "Warrior's Return" (1955, Galaxy 1955/11)
- "Watchbird" (1953, Notions: Unlimited)
- "We Are Alone" (1952, Future Nov 1952)
- "Welcome to the Standard Nightmare" (1973, The Robot Who Looked Like Me)
- "What Is Life?" (1976, The Robot Who Looked Like Me)
- "What Goes Up" (1953, Science Fiction Adventures 1953/5)
- "What a Man Believes" (1953, Fantastic SF 1953/11)
- "Wild Talents, Inc." (1953, Is THAT What People Do?)
- "World of Heart's Desire" – see "The Store of the Worlds"
- "Wormworld" (1991, The Collected Short Stories of Robert Sheckley Book Five)
- "Writing Class" (1952, Imagination 1952/12)
- "Xolotl" (1991, Pulphouse: Eugene, OR 1991)
- "Zirn Left Unguarded, the Jenghik Palace in Flames, Jon Westerly Dead" (1972, The Robot Who Looked Like Me)

== AAA Ace Interplanetary Decontamination Service series ==
- "Milk Run" (1954/9, Pilgrimage to Earth)
- "Ghost V (Galaxy 1954/10, The People Trap)
- "The Laxian Key" (Galaxy 1954/11, The People Trap)
- "Squirrel Cage" (Galaxy Jan 1955)
- "The Lifeboat Mutiny" (1955/4, Pilgrimage to Earth)
- "The Necessary Thing (Galaxy 1955/6, The People Trap)
- "The Skag Castle" (1956, Is THAT What People Do?)
- "Sarkanger" (1982? 1986?, Stardate Jan/Feb 1986)
