= Is That What People Do? =

Short story collection by Robert Sheckley

- First edition Cover art by David Gambale
- Author: Robert Sheckley
- Language: English
- Publisher: Holt, Rinehart and Winston
- Publication date: 1984
- ISBN: 0-03-063707-4 (first edition)
- Dewey Decimal: 813.54
- LC Class: PS3569.H392 I8

Is That What People Do? is a collection of science fiction short stories by Robert Sheckley. It was first published in 1984 by Holt, Rinehart and Winston. The collection contains new as well as previously published works. The latter are the following stories:

- "The Language of Love" (1957, appeared in Notions: Unlimited)
- "The Accountant" (1954, appeared in Citizen in Space)
- "A Wind Is Rising" (1957, appeared in Notions: Unlimited)
- "The Robot Who Looked Like Me" (1973, appeared in The Robot Who Looked Like Me)
- "The Mnemone" (1971, appeared in Can You Feel Anything When I Do This?)
- "Warm" (1953, appeared in Untouched by Human Hands)
- "The Native Problem" (1956, appeared in Notions: Unlimited)
- "Fishing Season" (1953, appeared in The People Trap)
- "Shape" (1953, appeared in Untouched by Human Hands, also known as "Keep Your Shape")
- "Beside Still Waters" (1953, appeared in Untouched by Human Hands)
- "Silversmith Wishes" (1977, appeared in The Robot Who Looked Like Me)
- "Fool's Mate" (1953, appeared in Shards of Space)
- "Pilgrimage to Earth" (1956, appeared in Pilgrimage to Earth, also known as "Love, Incorporated")
- "All the Things You Are" (1956, appeared in Pilgrimage to Earth)
- "The Store of the Worlds" (1959, appeared in Store of Infinity, also known as "The World of Heart's Desire")
- "Seventh Victim" (1953, appeared in Untouched by Human Hands)
- "Cordle to Onion to Carrot" (1969, appeared in Can You Feel Anything When I Do This?)
- "The Prize of Peril" (1958, appeared in Store of Infinity)
- "Fear in the Night" (1952, appeared in Pilgrimage to Earth)
- "Can You Feel Anything When I Do This?" (1969, appeared in Can You Feel Anything When I Do This?)
- "The Battle" (1954, appeared in Citizen in Space)
- "The Monsters" (1953, appeared in Untouched by Human Hands)
- "The Petrified World" (1968, appeared in Can You Feel Anything When I Do This?)
- "Is THAT What People Do?" (1978, appeared in The Robot Who Looked Like Me)

The stories that were not published in previous collections of short stories are:

- "Meanwhile, Back at the Bromide" (1962)
- "Five Minutes Early" (1982)
- "Miss Mouse and the Fourth Dimension" (1982)
- "The Skag Castle" (1956)
- "The Helping Hand" (1981)
- "The Last Days of (Parallel?) Earth" (1980)
- "The Future Lost" (1980)
- "Wild Talents, Inc." (1953)
- "The Swamp" (1981)
- "The Future of Sex: Speculative Journalism"(1982)
- "The Life of Anybody" (1984)
- "Good-Bye Forever to Mr. Pain" (1979)
- "The Shaggy Average American Man Story" (1979)
- "The Shootout in the Toy Shop" (1981)
- "How Pro Writers Really Write—Or Try To" (1982)
