= Feeding Time (disambiguation) =

Feeding Time is a 2014 puzzle video game.

Feeding Time may also refer to:

- "Feeding Time", a short story in Notions: Unlimited
- "Feeding Time", an episode of Tom and Jerry Tales
- "Feeding Time" (Superman: The Animated Series), a 1996 episode of Superman: The Animated Series
