= Prince Charming =

Theme in storytelling, often used as a stock character

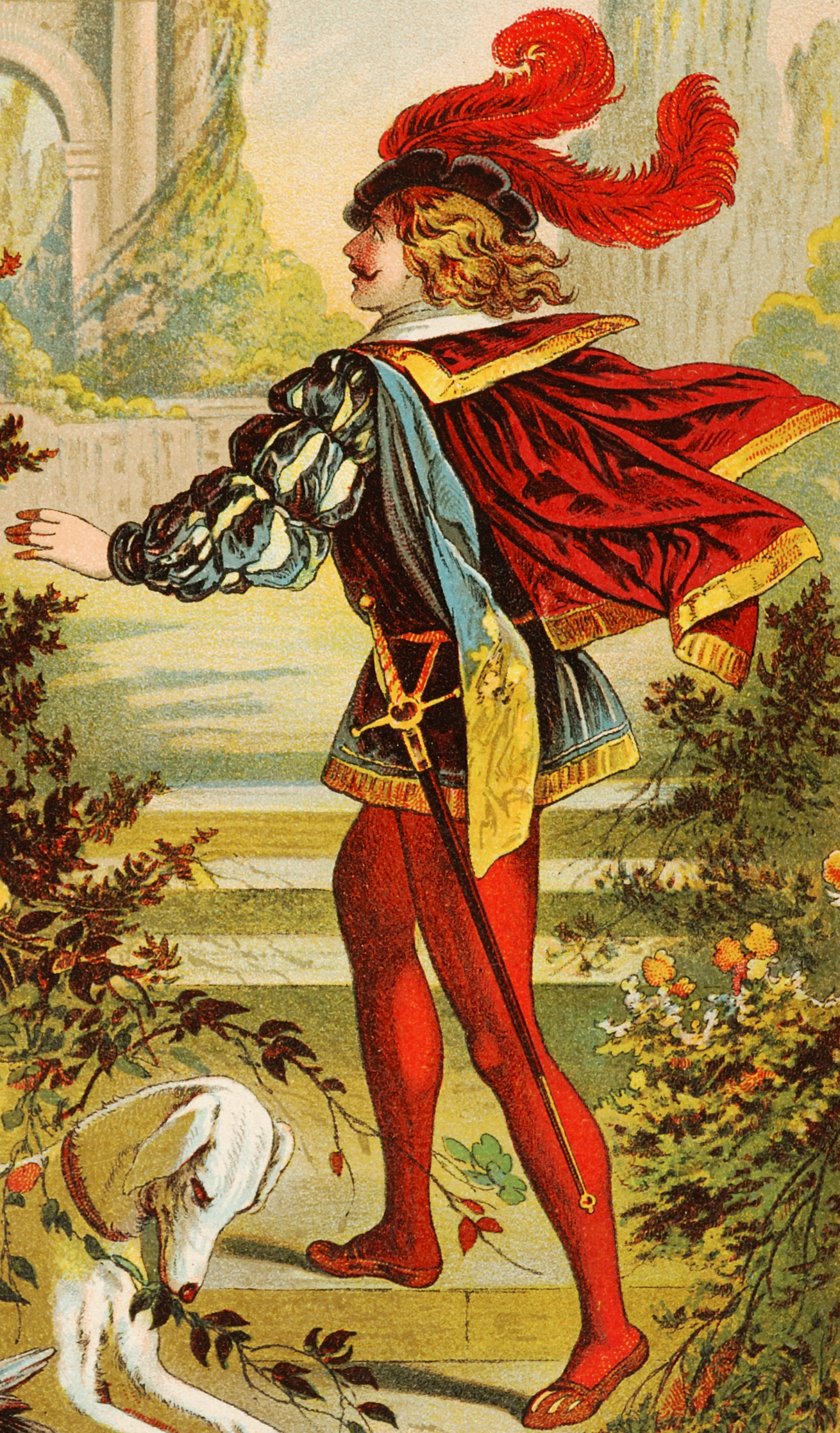
Prince Charming of Sleeping Beauty, a print drawing from the late-19th-century book Mein erstes Märchenbuch (My First Book of Fairy Tales), published in Stuttgart, Germany

Prince Charming is a fairy tale stock character archetype who comes to the rescue of a damsel in distress and must engage in a quest to liberate her from an evil spell. This classification suits most heroes of a number of traditional folk tales, including "Snow White", "Sleeping Beauty", "Rapunzel", and "Cinderella" even if in the original story they were given another name, or no name at all.

Elements of the Prince Charming character date at least back to Charles Perrault's Sleeping Beauty, published in 1697. Often handsome and romantic, these characters are essentially interchangeable, serving as a foil to the heroine; in many variants, they can be viewed as a metaphor for a reward the heroine achieves for the decisions she makes. The prominence of the character type makes him an obvious and frequent target for revisionist fairy tales, usually portraying him as narcissistic, dimwitted, and solely focused on romance, and often as a foil to either the heroine or their true love interest. "Prince Charming" is also used as a term to refer to the idealized man some people dream of as a future spouse.

== History of the term ==
Charles Perrault's version of Sleeping Beauty, published in 1697, includes the following text at the point where the princess wakes up: "'Est-ce vous, mon prince? lui dit-elle; vous vous êtes bien fait attendre.' Le prince, charmé de ces paroles, ne savait comment lui témoigner sa joie et sa reconnaissance." ("'Is it you, my Prince?' she said; 'You made me wait a long while.' The Prince, charmed with these words, and much more with the manner in which they were spoken, knew not how to show his joy and gratitude.") It has sometimes been suggested that this passage later inspired the term, "Prince Charming", even though it is the prince who is charmed (charmé) here, not who is being charming (charmant).

In the 17th century, Madame d'Aulnoy wrote two fairy tales, The Story of Pretty Goldilocks, where the hero was named Avenant ("Fine", "Beautiful", in French), and The Blue Bird, where the hero was Le roi Charmant ("The Charming King"). When Andrew Lang retold the first (in 1889) for The Blue Fairy Book, he rendered the hero's name as "Charming"; the second, for The Green Fairy Book, as "King Charming". Although neither one was a prince and the first was not royal, this may have been the original use of "Charming".

In the early Disney animated feature Snow White and the Seven Dwarfs (1937), when Snow White tells the dwarfs about her prince, she says, "Anyone could see that the prince was charming, the only one for me." However, he is never referred to specifically as "Prince Charming". Andreas Deja initially struggled with the concept of animating a handsome villain in Beauty and the Beast. Deja ultimately based Gaston's appearance on those of handsome soap opera actors in order to create a grotesque version of the Prince Charming stock character.

In other languages, like Spanish and Italian, he is called the "Blue Prince".

== Modern usage ==
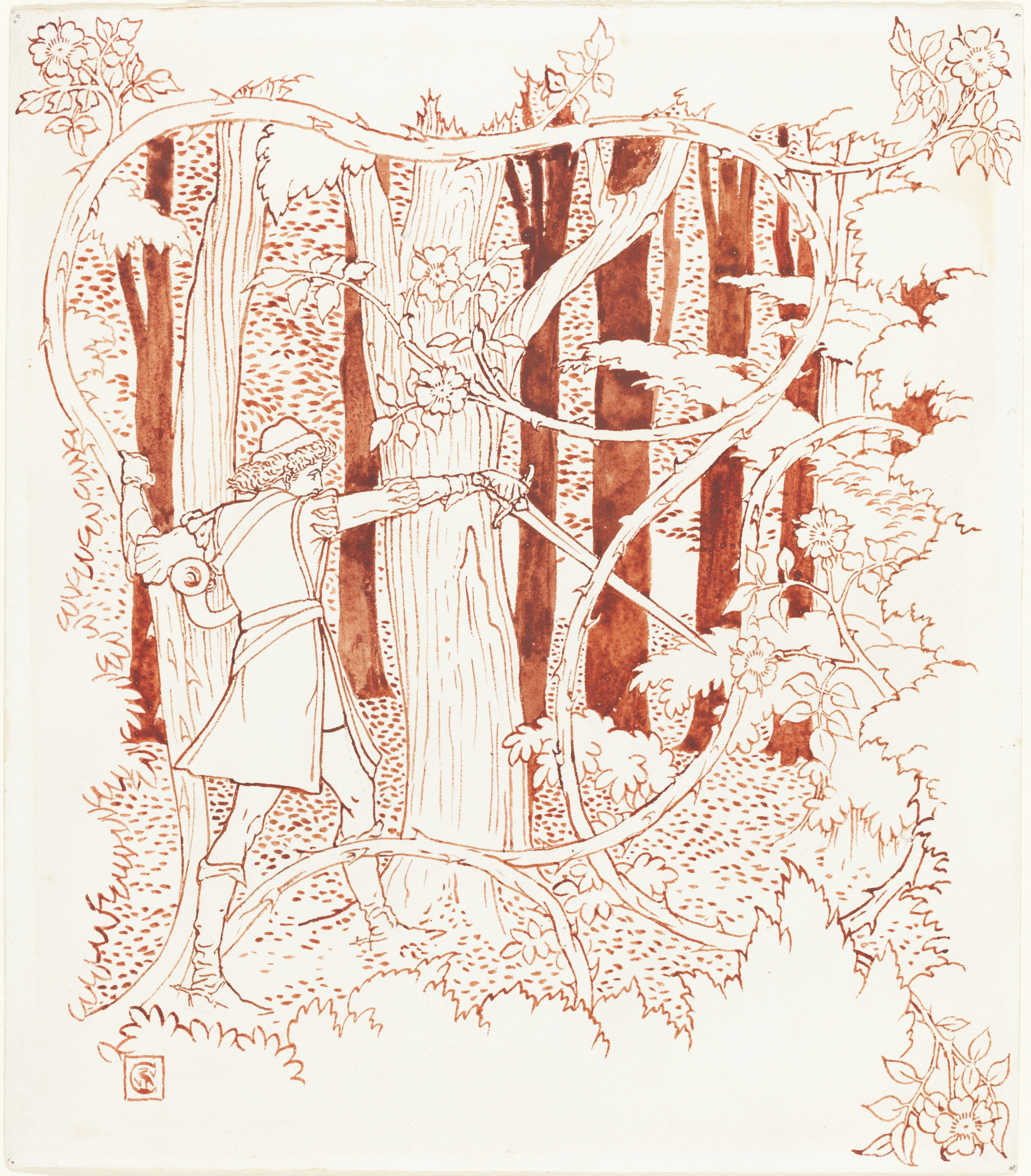
Walter Crane, Prince Charming in the Forest, NGA 65745

- The Broadway musical Into the Woods (first produced in 1986) explores the character as lecherous, and where there are not one, but two Prince Charmings. Here, they are shown as brothers pursuing Cinderella and Rapunzel, then later, Sleeping Beauty and Snow White, after they have married their first wenches. Cinderella's Prince has an affair with the Baker’s wife as well, and when confronted about his womanizing, states "I was raised to be charming, not sincere." The princes are portrayed by Robert Westenberg and Chuck Wagner in the original Broadway cast and by Gavin Creel and Joshua Henry in the original 2022 Broadway revival cast, Andy Karl played both princes for limited runs in the revival and Cheyenne Jackson played Cinderella's Prince for a limited run as well. In the 2014 Disney film adaptation of Into the Woods, the Prince Charmings are portrayed by Chris Pine and Billy Magnussen.
- As implied by the title, the 1991 fantasy novel Bring Me the Head of Prince Charming by Roger Zelazny and Robert Sheckley includes sharp satire of the traditional fairy tale theme.
- Prince Charming is a prominent character in the Fables comic book (2002–2015). Polygamy is explored again: in that version, he successively married Snow White, Sleeping Beauty and Cinderella with each marriage ending in divorce due to his compulsive womanizing. He himself comments: "I always truly love a woman when I first pursue her...I'm just no good at the happily-ever-after part." He parlays his charm into election as the mayor of Fabletown, the underground "Fable" community, and finds the job more difficult than he had anticipated. He died in the Battle for the Homelands by activating a bomb to End the War.
- The character of Prince Charming is deconstructed in the 2004 movie Shrek 2 and its 2007 follow-up Shrek the Third, wherein he is the son of the Fairy Godmother and has an unpleasant, narcissistic and ruthless personality unfitting for a fairy-tale prince.
- In the fantasy novel series The Sisters Grimm (2005–2012), Prince Charming is the mayor of Ferryport Landing, a town inhabited by fairy-tale characters- or everafters. He is shown to be rude, arrogant and boastful, but turns out to be a valuable ally to the protagonists of the series. He is shown to have married and slept with many of the girls in this town, among them Cinderella, Snow White and Sleeping Beauty. But he clarifies that he truly loves Snow White and proposes to her. He then separates himself from her for her protection.
- The concept of the Prince Charming is parodied in the 2007 film Enchanted when Edward is looking for Princess Giselle in the New York City. While knocking the doors he finds a pregnant housewife holding three kids, who tells him, in a scoffing voice, "You're too late."
- The Ever After High franchise features the three children of Prince Charming: Daring, Darling, and Dexter Charming.
- In the television series Once Upon a Time (2011–2017), Prince Charming (portrayed by Josh Dallas) is the husband of Snow White, though neither of them remembers this in the cursed Storybrooke, where the character's name is David Nolan ("Charming" is the nickname given to him by Snow White). In his previous life, David is actually the brother of the real prince James (also portrayed by Josh Dallas) who died and was replaced with his twin. Both brothers were born to a poor farm couple who made a deal with Rumpelstiltskin to save their farm; they gave up one son to King George, whose wife could not conceive. After James's death his brother found out the truth and took his place, becoming engaged to Abigail, daughter of King Midas (reluctantly, after his family is threatened by King George) in a deal that unites two kingdoms with Midas giving King George gold in exchange for the prince defeating a dragon. Later, the prince meets and marries Snow White with whom he has a daughter named Emma. In Storybrooke, David is a John Doe with amnesia who meets and falls for Mary Margaret, who is really Snow White, before recovering his memory and working at the Storybrooke Sheriff Department. He later has another child with Snow White named Neal.
- In the book series The Land of Stories (2012) by Chris Colfer, there are four Prince Charmings, who are brothers named Chance, Chase, Chandler and Charles Charming who are married to Cinderella, Sleeping Beauty, Snow White and Red Riding Hood respectively.
