= Squirrel-cage =

Squirrel-cage may refer to:

- a squirrel-cage rotor
- a squirrel-cage fan, another name for a centrifugal fan
- a hamster wheel
- "Squirrel Cage", a short story by Robert Sheckley
- "The Squirrel Cage", a short story by Thomas M. Disch
