= Alone at Last =

Alone at Last may refer to:

== Albums ==
- Alone at Last with Tony Bennett, 1955 album by Tony Bennett
- Alone at Last (album), 1971 album by Gary Burton
- Alone at Last, 1979 album by Tommy Tedesco
- Alone at Last, Live with DJ Who, 2000 album by Lake Trout
- Alone at Last, 2006 album by Ron Keel
- Alone at Last, 2018 album by Tasha

== Films ==
- Alone at Last (film), 1942 film
- Alone at Last, alternative title for the film Her Night Out (1932)

== Songs ==
- "Alone at Last" (song), song by Jackie Wilson
- "Alone at Last" (Neil Sedaka song), song by Neil Sedaka

== Television ==
- "Alone at Last", a 1975 episode of the TV series All in the Family
- Alone at Last (1980 television pilots), two film-length television pilots that aired on NBC in 1980
- "Alone at Last", a 2021 episode of the TV series The Great

== Other ==
- "Alone at Last", a short story by Robert Sheckley published in Shards of Space
- Alone at Last, English title for Franz Lehar's operetta Endlich allein
