= The Starlit Corridor =

1967 science fiction anthology edited by Roger Mansfield

The Starlit Corridor: Modern Science Fiction Short Stories & Poems Compiled by Roger Mansfield
- First edition
- Genre: science fiction anthology
- Publisher: Pergamon Press
- Publication date: 1967
- Pages: xi+145
- ISBN: 0-08-303370-X
- OCLC: 561954361

The Starlit Corridor is a 1967 science fiction anthology edited by Roger Mansfield. It was published by Pergamon Press.

== Contents ==
- "Space: Third Millennium", poem by Denis Pethebridge
- "Before Eden" (1961), short story by Arthur C. Clarke
- "Return of the Moon Man" (1955), short story by Eric Malpass
- "The Space Pilot", poem by J. Blackie
- "Space Probe to Venus", poem by Constantine FitzGibbon
- "Disappearing Act" (1953), short story by Alfred Bester (first published in Star 1953)
- "To See the Rabbit", poem by Alan Brownjohn
- "Pawley's Peepholes" (1951), short story by John Wyndham
- "Tea in a Space-Ship", poem by James Kirkup
- "The Monsters" (1953), short story by Robert Sheckley
- "Harrison Bergeron" (1961), short story by Kurt Vonnegut, Jr.
- "The Happy Man" (1963), novelette by Gerald W. Page
- "Bedtime Story" (1963), poem by George MacBeth
- "The Liberation of Earth" (1953), short story by William Tenn
- "Science Fiction" (1960), poem by Kingsley Amis
