= Option =

Option or Options may refer to:

== Computing ==
- Option key, a key on Apple computer keyboards
- Option type, a polymorphic data type in programming languages
- Command-line option, an optional parameter to a command
- OPTIONS, an HTTP request method
- Option, an individual computer configuration setting

== Literature ==
- Options (novel), a novel by Robert Sheckley
- Option (car magazine), a Japanese car magazine
- Option (music magazine), a defunct American music magazine
- "Options", a 1979 story by John Varley

== Legal rights ==
- Option (aircraft purchasing)
- Option of nationality, the right to choose a nationality when the sovereignty is transferred from one state to another
  - South Tyrol Option Agreement, a forced resettling contract between fascist Italy and Nazi Germany regarding the German-speaking inhabitants of South Tyrol
- Option (filmmaking), a contractual agreement between a film producer and a writer, in which the producer obtains the right to buy a screenplay from the writer before a certain date.
- Option (finance), an instrument that conveys the right, but not the obligation, to engage in a future transaction (for example, on some underlying security or on a parcel of real property), or in a futures contract
- Option contract, a type of legal contract

== Music ==
- "Options" (Cameron Whitcomb song), 2025
- "Options" (Luke James song), 2014
- "Options" (NSG song), 2018
- "Options", a song by Doja Cat from Planet Her, 2021
- "Options", a song by EarthGang, 2020
- "Options", a song by Iñigo Pascual, 2019
- "Options", a song by Loren Gray, 2019
- "Options", a song by Internet Money, 2022
- "Options", a song by NF from The Search, 2019
- "Options", a song by PartyNextDoor from PartyNextDoor Two, 2014
- "Options", a song by Pedro the Lion from Control, 2002
- "Options", a song by Pitbull from Climate Change, 2017
- "Options", a song by Twice from This Is For, 2025

== Sport ==
- Option (baseball), a baseball player who can be moved back and forth between major and minor league teams
- Option offense, an offensive scheme in American football primarily predicated on option runs
- Option run, a play in American and Canadian football

== Other uses ==
- "Options" (Welcome to Paradox), an episode of Welcome to Paradox
- Option N.V., a company providing wireless technology devices
- "The Option", an alternate name for the South Tyrol Option Agreement, a resettlement program of German speakers living in Italy initiated by Adolf Hitler and Benito Mussolini
- Flight Options, an American fractional ownership airline founded by Kenn Ricci that uses the callsign "Options"
