= Bring Me the Head of Prince Charming =

1991 novel by Roger Zelazny and Robert Sheckley

- First edition
- Author: Roger Zelazny, Robert Sheckley
- Cover artist: Don Maitz
- Language: English
- Series: The Millennial Contest series
- Genre: Fantasy, humoristic
- Publisher: Bantam Spectra
- Publication date: 1991
- Publication place: United States
- Media type: Print (hardcover)
- Pages: 286
- ISBN: 0-553-35448-5
- Followed by: If at Faust You Don't Succeed

Bring Me the Head of Prince Charming (1991) is a fantasy novel by Roger Zelazny and Robert Sheckley.

== Introduction ==
Every millennium, a large contest is waged between the forces of good, and the forces of evil, which determines events during the following millennium. On the side of evil, there is the demon and master of sabotage, Azzie Elbub; on the side of good, there is the angel Babriel. Both entities must abide by the rules and customs set by their own sects. The contest is a trial of human nature and takes the form of a fairy tale involving two humans—a prince and a princess. Their choices will determine the winner.

== See also ==
- Prince Charming, a stock fairy tale character that the book satirizes.
- Bring Me the Head of Alfredo Garcia, a 1974 movie that seems to lend its title to the novel.
