= Options (novel) =

1975 novel by Robert Sheckley

- Cover of the first edition
- Author: Robert Sheckley
- Language: English
- Genre: Science fiction, absurdist fiction, metafiction
- Publisher: Pyramid Books
- Publication date: 1975
- Publication place: United States
- Media type: print (paperback)
- Pages: 158
- ISBN: 978-0-515-03688-6
- Preceded by: Dimension of Miracles
- Followed by: The Alchemical Marriage of Alistair Crompton

Options is a 1975 absurdist science fiction novel by American writer Robert Sheckley, published in paperback by Pyramid Books. The first British edition appeared in 1977, and a French translation was published in 1979.

== Plot ==
The story is ostensibly about a marooned space traveller's attempt to get a spare part for his starship, the Intrepid III. He has a robotic guard, programmed to guard him against all planetary dangers. But soon he discovers that the robot has not been programmed for the planet where they are, with comic results. However, the narrative later descends into a mass of diversions, non-sequiturs and meditations on the nature of authorship. Eventually the diversions take over the book to the extent that the author openly introduces an increasingly bizarre succession of deus ex machina in an attempt to get the novel back on track, but eventually admits defeat.

== Reception ==
Spider Robinson reviewed the novel favorably, declaring that although Sheckley deliberately broke most of the rules for successful storytelling, Options was "hilarious... an exploding cigarette, a velvet banana, a bearded tractor, a Presbyterian platypus."

Dave Langford reviewed Options for White Dwarf #86, and stated that "the author is 'unable' to construct a credible plot device to save the situation. Lots of fun but, for obvious reasons, not much plot."
