= The Status Civilization =

1960 novel by Robert Sheckley

- Author: Robert Sheckley
- Language: English
- Genre: Science fiction
- Publication date: 1960
- Publication place: United States
- Media type: Print

The Status Civilization is a science fiction novel by American writer Robert Sheckley, first published in 1960.

The Status Civilization concerns Will Barrent, a man who finds himself, without memory of any crime or, indeed, of his previous life, being shipped across space to the planet Omega.

Omega, used to imprison extreme offenders, has a hierarchical society of extreme brutality, where the only way to advance (and avoid dying) is to commit an endless series of crimes. The average life expectancy from time of arrival on Omega is three years. The story concerns Barrent's attempt to survive, escape, and return to Earth to clear himself of the accusations against him.

== Plot summary ==
Will Barrent awakes in a room with no memory of his past life. He is told he is on a ship en route to the prison planet Omega. This, along with the wiping or suppression of his memory, is a punishment for committing murder on Earth.

On Omega, killing new arrivals is legal until sunset on Landing Day. Barrant manages to survive with the help of a woman who hands him a gun and then seems to disappear.

Barrent begins to integrate into Omegan society. The law reflects the state religion, which is based around the worship of Evil (always capitalised) and an entity known as The Black One. All inhabitants of the planet are convicts from Earth whose memories have been suppressed, but many try to regain parts of their memory by the use of drugs or a kind of psychic reading known as "skrenning". Barrent tries a drug and recalls an image of himself standing over a dead body while holding a gun. This persuades him that he was guilty, despite his normal revulsion to killing.

Barrent avoids killing and several other Omegan customs, and is soon arrested for the crimes of non-drug addiction and impiety, and sent for a trial by ordeal. He is made to fight for his life against a large robot in an arena. Among the spectators he sees the woman who gave him the gun on his first day, and she tells him through gestures how to find the robot's hidden weakness. Having defeated the robot, Barrent's status is increased and he meets the woman who helped him, Moera Ermais. Ermais turns out to be part of a secret organisation. She tells Barrent she thought of recruiting him because he seemed to have good survival skills, but was not allowed to because of his murder conviction.

Barrent seeks out a "skrenner" to try to learn about his conviction. She names the victim and directs Barrent to a man on Omega who claims to have committed the murder. She also tells him of a confusing vision of the future, in which she saw Barrant looking at a shattered, "shiny" version of his own corpse. Barrant, now believing he was framed, sends a message to Ermais and becomes less interested in obeying Omegan laws.

Barrant's continued non-conforming behaviour leads to him being selected for the annual "Hunt" and "Games", both of which are fatal to most entrants. He wins the Games and is engulfed by a manifestation of the Black One, which turns out to be an elaborate light-show controlled by the secret organisation. They believe that society on Omega is on the verge of collapse, and hope to avert or survive this by re-directing people's energy into an uprising against Earth. Barrant is smuggled aboard a returning prison ship, hoping to gain information about Earth and see if there are any underground movements that might be willing to oppose the presumed oppressive Earth government.

Earth turns out to be a uniform, sleepy and stagnant society, developing neither socially nor technologically. Its striking social stability is maintained by robots brainwashing children in "closed classes," which they are required to attend but cannot consciously remember. There is a world religion, an amalgam of all the "good" aspects of previous Earth religions. Its ideology closely resembles that on Omega, differing mostly in words and in the justifications for various actions.

As Barrent comes closer to the truth about the reasons for his exile, his conscious mind conflicts with the subconscious programming he received as a child. He finally learns that, although innocent of the murder, circumstances had made him appear guilty. That was enough to trigger his own programming, causing him to turn himself in to the automated legal system. He also finds that everybody has been programmed to commit suicide if they ever consciously learn about their programming. Barrent struggles not to be killed by his programmed alter ego, which he associates with his image in a mirror. Eventually he prevails, shattering the mirror in the process.

== Reception ==
David Langford reviewed The Status Civilization for White Dwarf #80, and described it as "unsubtle, action-packed fun with satirical touches, set on a world where crime is the law and the hero soon gets into trouble for non-drug addiction."

== Reviews ==
- Review by Alfred Bester (1960) in The Magazine of Fantasy and Science Fiction, December 1960
- Review by Frederik Pohl (1961) in If, #8 [UK]
- Review by John Carnell (1961) in New Worlds Science Fiction, #104 March
- Review by P. Schuyler Miller (1961) in Analog Science Fact and Fiction, July 1961
- Review [Dutch] by Eddy C. Bertin (1971) in Holland-SF 1971, #5
- Review by Joseph Nicholas (1979) in Paperback Parlour, August 1979
- Review by Chris Morgan (1979) in Vector 95
- Review by Martyn Taylor (1986) in Paperback Inferno, #62
