= Robots (2023 film) =

Film by Ant Hines and Casper Christensen

- Release poster
- Directed by: Ant Hines; Casper Christensen
- Screenplay by: Ant Hines; Casper Christensen
- Based on: "The Robot Who Looked Like Me" by Robert Sheckley
- Produced by: Bernd Wintersperger; Sascha Krnajac; Lars Sylvest; Thorsten Schumacher; Stephen Hamel; Julian Favre; Cassian Elwes
- Starring: Shailene Woodley; Jack Whitehall; Nick Rutherford; Emanuela Postacchini; Paul Rust
- Cinematography: Luke Geissbühler
- Edited by: Matthew Freund
- Music by: Magnus Fiennes
- Production companies: Robots Filmproduktion GmbH & Co. KG; Company Films; Road Film; Rocket Science; Elevated Films
- Distributed by: Neon
- Release date: May 19, 2023
- Running time: 93 minutes
- Country: United States
- Language: English

Robots is a 2023 American science fiction romantic comedy film written and directed by Ant Hines and Casper Christensen. It is based on the 1973 short story "The Robot Who Looked Like Me" by Robert Sheckley. The film stars Shailene Woodley and Jack Whitehall.

Robots was released in the United States by Neon on May 19, 2023.

== Plot ==
In 2032, advanced robotics allow humans to own lifelike androids as servants and manual laborers. Wealthy suburbanites Elaine and Charles secretly use illegal android doubles of themselves to manage the demands of work and dating. Charles’ duplicate, C2, performs his job and seduces women for him, while Elaine’s duplicate, E2, dates multiple men simultaneously to obtain money and gifts.

A mix-up in addresses leads Charles to mistakenly walk into a private board meeting and behave inappropriately, believing he is seducing Elaine. Meanwhile, C2 and E2 meet for the first time and spend the night together.

The next morning, Charles and Elaine both realize their androids are missing. When the two locate each other, they learn that C2 and E2 have fallen in love and gone rogue. They turn to Zach, the engineer who created the androids, for help. Zach tracks the pair via GPS but warns that recovering them will be nearly impossible, as they have achieved self-awareness.

Charles secretly enlists his ex-soldier friend Ashley ("Fat Ninja") to assist. The group captures the androids at a motel, subduing them with tasers and locking them in the trunk. However, C2 and E2 soon escape, stealing their human counterparts’ identities and assets. They record a fake video implicating Charles and Elaine in an armed robbery, using it as blackmail to keep them from pursuing them while they plan an escape to Mexico.

Broke and on the run, Charles and Elaine retreat to his stepfather’s remote cabin. Initially resentful of each other, they bond over whiskey and shared frustration. The next morning, Elaine realizes the androids intend to permanently replace them after seeing social media posts suggesting a wedding.

When they arrive at the vineyard wedding venue, they find C2 and E2 preparing to marry. Disguised as service androids, Charles and Elaine ambush them, tasing C2 and throwing him off a cliff before subduing E2. Desperate, they demand Zach’s help once more, borrowing his prototype sex robot, E3, to trick C2 into believing E2 has returned to Charles.

Their plan unravels when local deputies intervene and arrest both couples. Fingerprinting reveals identical matches, exposing the illegal clones. The sheriff alerts federal authorities, eager for media attention, but Charles uses his one phone call to contact Ashley, who orchestrates their escape by destroying the police station and all evidence.

At the Mexican border, identical retinal scans mean only two can cross. In a moment of redemption, Charles urges C2 to leave with E2, allowing the androids freedom in a country where they will be recognized as equals.

With no remaining evidence, Charles and Elaine avoid prosecution. Having learned empathy from their creations, they reconcile and symbolically take C2 and E2’s place in the wedding ceremony.

== Cast ==
- Shailene Woodley as Elaine / E2 / E3
- Jack Whitehall as Charles Cameron / C2
- Paul Rust as Zach
- Nick Rutherford as Ted Jr.
- Paul Jurewicz as Ashley
- David Grant Wright as Ted Cameron
- Emanuela Postacchini as Francesca
- Chelsea Edmundson as Emily Denholm
- Jackamoe Buzzell as Sheriff Bill Horton
- Samantha Ashley as Deputy Chavez
- Richard Lippert as David Schulman
- Kate Herman as Kiki Schulman

== Production ==
Emma Roberts was originally cast in June 2020, until Shailene Woodley replaced her in June of the following year.

Filming occurred in New Mexico in August 2021.

== Release ==
In April 2023, Neon acquired US and Caribbean rights to Robots. The film was released simultaneously in select theaters and on video on demand in the United States on May 19, 2023. It was also released theatrically in select European territories, beginning in Lithuania on June 6, 2023.

== Reception ==
=== Box office ===
Robots grossed $225,065 in Croatia, Lithuania, Portugal, Russia, Slovenia, and Turkey.

=== Critical response ===
On the review aggregator website Rotten Tomatoes, 18% of 11 critics' reviews are positive, with an average rating of 3.5/10. Lisa Nystrom of FilmInk said, "There are no real laugh-out-loud moments, no emotionally moving denouement, just a bland but good-natured outing you can safely forget the moment it’s over."
