= Freejack =

1992 film by Geoff Murphy

- Theatrical release poster
- Directed by: Geoff Murphy
- Screenplay by: Steven Pressfield; Ronald Shusett; Dan Gilroy
- Story by: Steven Pressfield; Ronald Shusett
- Based on: Immortality, Inc. by Robert Sheckley
- Produced by: Ronald Shusett; Stuart Oken
- Starring: Emilio Estevez; Mick Jagger; Rene Russo; Anthony Hopkins; Jonathan Banks; David Johansen
- Cinematography: Amir Mokri (Uncredited)
- Edited by: Dennis Virkler
- Music by: Trevor Jones
- Production company: Morgan Creek Productions
- Distributed by: Warner Bros.
- Release date: January 17, 1992
- Running time: 110 minutes
- Country: United States
- Language: English
- Budget: $30 million
- Box office: $37 million

Freejack is a 1992 American science fiction film directed by Geoff Murphy and starring Emilio Estevez, Mick Jagger, Rene Russo, and Anthony Hopkins.

The screenplay was written by Steven Pressfield, Ronald Shusett and Dan Gilroy, who adapted it from the 1959 science fiction novel Immortality, Inc. by Robert Sheckley. The film was produced by Morgan Creek and released by Warner Bros. in the United States on January 17, 1992. It received mostly negative reviews.

== Plot ==
In 2009, the super-wealthy achieve immortality by hiring "bonejackers", mercenaries equipped with time travel devices, to snatch people from the past, just prior to the moment of their deaths, for use as substitute bodies. Those who escape are known as "freejacks.” In this dystopian future, most people suffer from poor health as a result of drug use and environmental pollution, making them unattractive as replacement bodies.

Alex Furlong is a Formula One racer who is about to die in a 1991 crash when a time machine snatches him into 21st century New York City, now a futuristic dystopia populated by scavengers and killers. When Furlong's captors are ambushed by a hit squad, Furlong escapes from Victor Vacendak, a mercenary who has snatched him on behalf of the McCandless Corporation. Alex's former fiancée Julie Redlund is now an executive at McCandless.

Alex spends much time escaping Victor, a ruthless pursuer who nevertheless lives by a code of honor, and rekindling his relationship with Julie. Ian McCandless, Julie's boss, is revealed to have died and seeks to install his backed-up personality into Furlong's body. Besides evading Vacendak's mercenaries and McCandless police personnel, Alex and Julie flee from the private guards of McCandless's right-hand man Mark Michelette, who is gunning for McCandless's position.

After an encounter wherein Alex spares Vacendak's life, Julie rescues Alex. Tired of running, Alex pretends to take Julie hostage and negotiates with Michelette to arrange a meeting, counting on him not knowing about their past relationship; however, Michelette has seen the footage of Julie's grief after Alex's 1991 accident. After she slaps Michelette in return for his mockery, the couple flees. They are thwarted when they encounter a gunfight in the lobby between two factions: McCandless's security guards and Vacendak's mercenaries. Julie plans to leave the building through an "escape module" on the hundredth floor, but the elevator takes them automatically to the top of the building where McCandless's mind is in storage. In a virtual reality encounter with McCandless's essence, he explains his goal: to use Alex's body to satiate his love for Julie. Apologizing, he offers to die and let Alex run the company under the guise of being McCandless.

As they consider the offer, Vacendak arrives, and McCandless reveals that he was stalling for time. Alex fights the process as Michelette stumbles in, wounded from fighting Vacendak's soldiers. In the confusion, Julie grabs the gun of the soldier holding her and fires a shot that disrupts the transfer process. The results are inconclusive as to whether McCandless or Alex is in Alex's body. The scientists cannot determine the answer, but Vacendak can, as only he knows a secret code McCandless gave him.

Alex reads the code, and Michelette tries to kill him but is gunned down by Vacendak's men. Alex remarks about how he feels in his "new" body before telling Julie that she will be dressed more appropriately so that they can take a drive. Hours later, after the coup is over, Julie and Alex get into one of McCandless's favorite vehicles; Alex tells the driver that he will drive. Vacendak stops them as the car leaves the estate. The transfer was not complete; Furlong got McCandless's secret number wrong, according to Vacendak who went along with it. He simply waited until Furlong made a mistake: McCandless did not know how to drive. Vacendak admonishes Julie that "you'll have to coach him better than that", then leaves while Furlong and Julie speed away.

== Cast ==
- Emilio Estevez as Alex Furlong
- Mick Jagger as Victor Vacendak
- Rene Russo as Julie Redlund
- Anthony Hopkins as Ian McCandless
- Jonathan Banks as Mark Michelette
- Grand L. Bush as Boone
- David Johansen as Brad
- Amanda Plummer as Nun
- Wilbur Fitzgerald as Earnhart
- Frankie Faison as Eagle Man
- John Shea as Morgan
- Mike Starr as Shaggy Man
- Esai Morales as Ripper
- Jerry Hall as Newswoman
- Harsh Nayyar as Cab Driver

== Production ==
The role of Julie Redlund was originally going to be played by Linda Fiorentino, but due to scheduling conflicts she dropped out and Rene Russo signed on to replace her. Shooting took place in Atlanta, Georgia.

According to reports at the time of the production and interviews with some members of the cast and crew, the original version of the movie had a disastrous test screening, so producer Ronald Shusett was brought in to re-shoot around 40% of the movie and add more character scenes and humor. Emilio Estevez also mentioned how director Geoff Murphy let them down by focusing too much on action in his original cut of the film. Murphy claims that there was interference from production company Morgan Creek and that he asked for his possessory credit to be removed.

== Reception ==
=== Critical reception ===
On Rotten Tomatoes, Freejack has an approval rating of 29% based on reviews from 21 critics and an average rating of 4.1/10. Audiences surveyed by CinemaScore gave the film a grade B−. Metacritic, which uses a weighted average, assigned the film a score of 34 out of 100, based on 22 critics, indicating "generally unfavorable" reviews. Peter Rainer of the Los Angeles Times said the film abandons its interesting premise and instead "devolves into a standard-issue chase picture". Rainer said the only reason to watch the film was for Murphy's direction, though he said Murphy's talents were wasted. Writing for The New York Times, Janet Maslin called it "overlong and unsightly". Owen Gleiberman at Entertainment Weekly described it routine urban chase thriller with sci-fi gimmicks, and a "cheap mishmash of Blade Runner, RoboCop, and Total Recall".

At the 1993 Saturn Awards, the film was nominated for Best Science Fiction Film, Best Supporting Actress for Rene Russo and Best Costumes for Lisa Jensen.

On the Late Show with David Letterman, Anthony Hopkins called the film "terrible".

=== Box office ===
The film was a box office bomb as it grossed only $17 million in the United States and Canada and $20 million internationally for a worldwide total of $37 million, based on a $30 million budget.

== Home video releases ==
Freejack was released on VHS and Laserdisc in 1992, a DVD release following in 2002, and a Blu-ray release in November 2018 by Sony Pictures Home Entertainment.

== Other media ==
In 1992, NOW Comics published a three-part miniseries based on the movie. The adaptation was ghostwritten by Clint McElroy.
