= Emanuela Postacchini =

Italian actress

- Born: Italy
- Occupation: Actress
- Years active: 2013–present
- Partner: Eoin Macken
- Children: 1

Emanuela Postacchini is an Italian actress. Her television roles include the satire Who Is America? (2018) and her film roles include Riff Raff (2024).

== Early life ==
Born in Italy to an Italian father and a French mother, she grew up in the Marche region where she did ballet dancing as a child and became interested in acting as a 13 year-old, after seeing local actors performing theatre. She first visited the United States in 2009 and relocated to the country a few years later.

== Career ==
She appeared in the Calvin Harris music video for My Way in 2016. Her early screen roles included The Last Ship, an adaptation of Anna Karenina and the feature films Better Days, The Man Who Was Thursday and Third Person. In 2017, she joined the cast of the television series The Alienist. She appeared in the Sacha Baron Cohen satire Who Is America? (2018).

She appeared in the 2022 anthology film The Seven Faces of Jane alongside Gillian Jacobs. In 2023, she could be seen in the film Robots. That year, she joined the film Riff Raff as part of an ensemble cast featuring Jennifer Coolidge, Gabrielle Union, Pete Davidson, Ed Harris, Lewis Pullman and Bill Murray. The film premiered at the 2024 Toronto International Film Festival.

== Personal life ==
She gave evidence during a Harvey Weinstein sexual assault trial in 2020. She is in a relationship with fellow actor Eoin Macken. They have a daughter, Bianca, born in October 2024.

== Partial filmography ==
Year	Title	Role	Notes
2013	Third Person	Neapolitan beauty	Film
2013	Anna Karenina	Sasha	2 episodes
2016	The Man Who Was Thursday	Tuesday	Film
2017	The Last Ship	Cali	2 episodes
2018	The Alienist	Flora	1 episode
2018	Who Is America?	Christina	4 episodes
2019	Better Days	Mia	Film
2022	The Seven Faces of Jane	Valentina	Feature film
2023	Robots	Francesca	Feature film
2024	Riff Raff	Marina	Feature film
