= Bus bunching =

Scheduling phenomenon in public transport

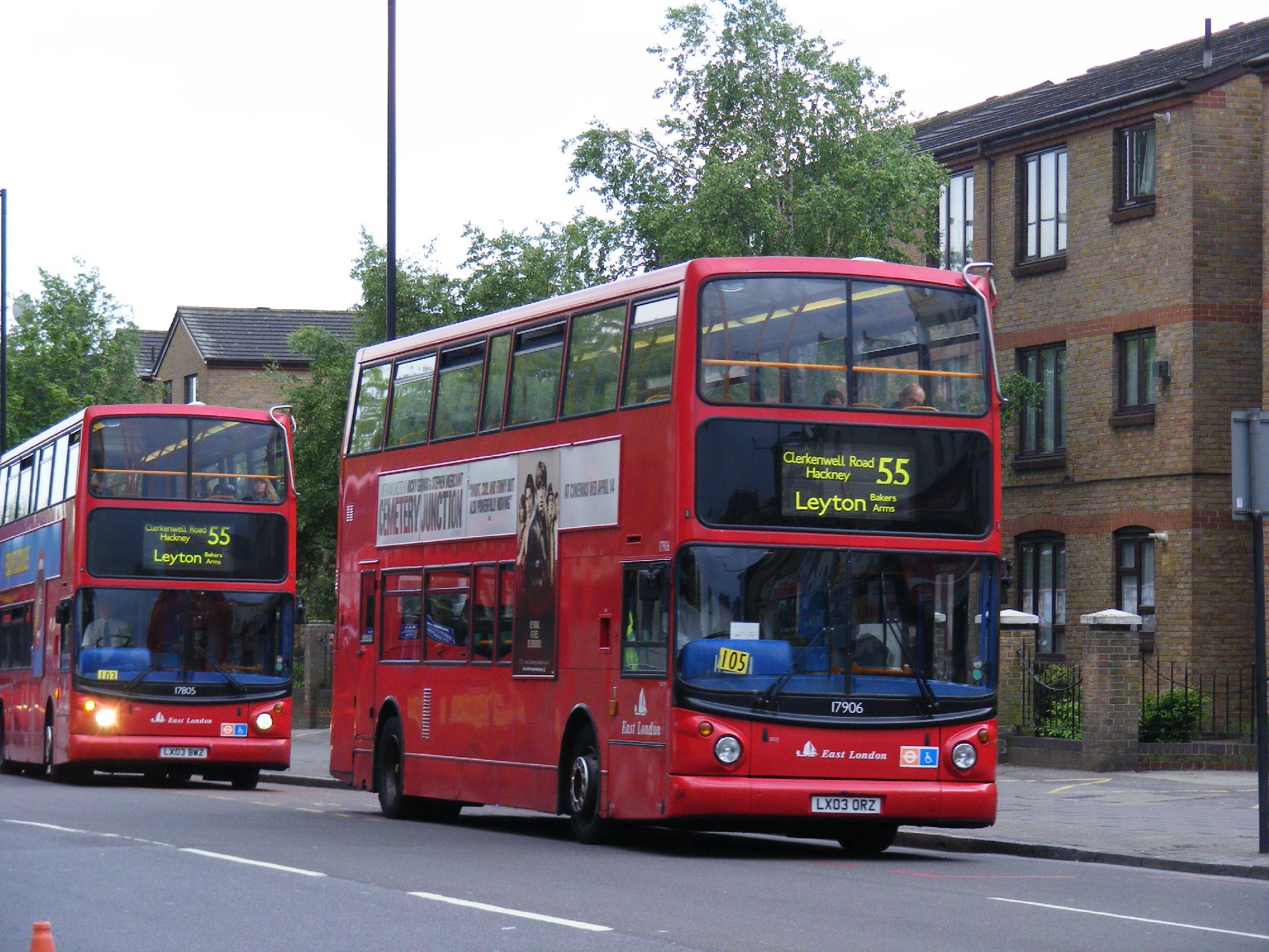
Two buses together on the same route

Graphs of distance s vs time t illustrating bus-bunching: 1 / Ideal journey; 2 / Bus B delayed by traffic congestion; 3 / B delayed by picking up passengers meant for C; 4 / C is early as B has picked up its passengers; 5 / Bus-bunching

In public transport, bus bunching, clumping, convoying, piggybacking or platooning is a phenomenon whereby two or more transit vehicles (such as buses or trains) that were scheduled at regular intervals along a common route instead bunch together and form a platoon. That occurs when the leading vehicles are unable to keep their schedule and fall behind to such an extent that trailing vehicles catch up to them.

== Description ==
A bus that is running slightly late will, in addition to its normal load, pick up passengers who would have taken the next bus if the first bus had not been late. These extra passengers delay the first bus even further. In contrast, the bus behind the late bus has a lighter passenger load than it otherwise would have had and may therefore run ahead of schedule. The classical causal model for irregular intervals is based on the observation that a late bus tends to get later and later as it completes its run, while the bus following it tends to get earlier and earlier.

Eventually, both buses form a pair, one right after the other, and the service deteriorates as the headway degrades from its nominal value. The buses that are stuck together are called a bus bunch or banana bus and may also involve more than two buses. The effect is often theorised to be the primary cause of reliability problems on bus and metro systems. Simulation studies have successfully demonstrated the extent of possible factors influencing bus bunching, and they may also be used to understand the impact of actions taken to overcome negative effects of bunching.

Clumping can be caused by random heavy usage of any particular vehicle, which results in it falling behind schedule. The leading vehicle eventually lapses towards the time slot of a later scheduled vehicle. Sometimes, the later scheduled vehicle gets ahead of its own timetable, and both vehicles meet between their scheduled times. One scheduled vehicle will most likely pass another in this case.

Clumping can be prevented or reduced as follows:

- Scheduling minimum and maximum amounts of time at each stop
- Scheduling some crowded runs to skip certain stops
- If, on a popular route with frequent service, a crowded vehicle arrives, passengers can be urged to wait for the next vehicle, which may be less crowded.
- When bunching occurs, the leading bus can be sped up, or the trailing bus can be slowed or held at specific stops. As part of this approach, a bus system may de-emphasize adherence to a target schedule and instead focus on achieving a target headway.

Another approach is to abandon the idea of a target schedule or a target headway, and dynamically adjust bus speeds according to live conditions, with the goal of minimizing the mean and variance of headways. That is used to control the buses on the campus of Northern Arizona University, which outperform the previously scheduled system.

A queueing theory paper in 1984 on multiple server cyclic queues observed the bus bunching effects and proposed a method called "dispersive schedules" to alleviate them. Merely adding more vehicles to the schedule without making other changes has been proven not to be a reliable solution to the problem of bunching.

== See also ==
- Accordion effect
- Matthew effect
- Positive feedback
- Wait/walk dilemma
