= Dimension of Miracles =

1968 novel by Robert Sheckley

- Cover of the first edition, published by Dell. Art by Paul Lehr.
- Author: Robert Sheckley
- Language: English
- Publication date: 1968

Dimension of Miracles is a 1968 satirical science fiction novel, with elements of absurdism, by American writer Robert Sheckley.

The novel concerns the odyssey of Tom Carmody, a New Yorker who wins a prize in the Intergalactic Sweepstakes.

== Plot summary ==
Thanks to a computer error, Tom Carmody, an unlucky civil servant, wins the main prize of the Galactic Lottery. Being a human from the Earth, he doesn't possess galactic status and shouldn't even be eligible. However, he obtains the Prize before the mistake is found out and is allowed to keep it. That's when his adventure begins, since, not being a space-traveling creature, he has no homing instinct that can guide him back to Earth, and so the galactic lottery organizers cannot transport him home. At the same time, his removal from his home environment has caused, by the 'universal law of predation', a predatory entity to spring into existence that perpetually pursues and aims to destroy him. So Carmody is forced to be on the run, and with the help of his Prize meets several well-meaning (but usually not very competent) aliens that attempt to find where, when and which Earth he belongs on. He ends up transporting from Earth to Earth: different phases and realities of his planet, which of course, is not in the time or condition he expects it to be.

== Similarity with The Hitchhiker's Guide to the Galaxy ==
Dimension of Miracles (1968) has been cited as similar to Douglas Adams's The Hitchhiker's Guide to the Galaxy (1978). In an interview for Neil Gaiman's book Don't Panic: The Official Hitchhiker's Guide to the Galaxy Companion, Adams said he had not read anything by Sheckley until after writing the Guide (the first volume in the series) and having seen it printed, and later found some of the parallels between the two works to be eerie, but after all a coincidence. Gaiman, in an interview two decades later, and five years after Adams' death, paraphrased Adams' comments saying that some of the resemblances had been "disturbingly close."
