= Immortality, Inc. =

1959 science fiction novel

- First edition (author's text)
- Author: Robert Sheckley
- Language: English
- Genre: Science fiction
- Published: First edition-1959 (Bantam Books), Second edition-1991 (Tor Books)
- Publisher: Bantam Books (first edition), Tor Books (1991 edition)
- Publication place: United States
- Media type: Paperback, hardcover, e-book
- Pages: 152 (first edition-paperback); 250 (1991 edition-paperback)

Immortality, Inc. is a 1959 science fiction novel by American writer Robert Sheckley, originally published in a shorter form in 1958 as Immortality Delivered. It was Sheckley's first novel and remains one of his most popular and critically acclaimed. The serialised form published under the title Time Killer in the magazine Galaxy Science Fiction was nominated for the Hugo Award for Best Novel the same year it was released (1959). The novel has been re-released in more than 50 editions since its initial publication, including a 2014 e-book.

== Premise and plot ==
The novel starts with its protagonist, Thomas Blaine, waking in an operating room during the procedure to give him a new host body and thus a new life. He is then soon conscious and aware of the fact he is living in the year 2110, a result of his mind being transferred into a new host body and the procedure completed. He must then learn to live with his new circumstances, as his last living moments were in 1958 and an existential struggle ensues with the new world he now finds himself living in.

== In film and television ==
This story was first adapted as the opening episode for the third series of the BBC science-fiction anthology series Out of the Unknown, starring Derek Benfield as Tom Clarke (a renamed Thomas Blaine). It was broadcast on 7 January 1969. The master videotape for the episode was later wiped by the corporation, and only brief video and audio clips are known to exist. The Beatles discuss watching it in the first part of The Beatles: Get Back.

The premise was loosely adapted into the 1992 film Freejack.

A famous scene from the novel involving a character lost in a future New York City and mistakenly getting in line for a suicide booth was parodied in the pilot episode of Futurama.
