= The Seven Faces of Jane =

- Directed by: Gillian Jacobs; Gia Coppola; Boma Iluma; Ryan Heffington; Alexandra Cassavetes; Julian Acosta; Ken Jeong; Alex Takacs
- Produced by: Roman Coppola; Jason Baum; Sarah Park; Allison Amon; Luke Ricci
- Starring: Gillian Jacobs
- Cinematography: Andy Catarisano; Jacob Mendel
- Edited by: Peter Cabada Hagan; Scott Hanson; Armen Harootun; Niles Howard; Jacob Mendel; Michael Wolfe
- Music by: Alex Krispin; Robert Schwartzman; Matt Sheehy; Leon Vynehall
- Distributed by: Gravitas Ventures
- Release dates: June 22, 2022 (Bentonville); January 13, 2023 (United States)
- Running time: 92 minutes
- Country: United States
- Language: English

The Seven Faces of Jane is a 2022 American anthology film. The film originates from directors Gillian Jacobs, Gia Coppola, Boma Iluma, Ryan Heffington, Alexandra Cassavetes, Julian Acosta, Ken Jeong and Alex Takacs. It consists of eight short films, all starring Jacobs as the title character.

The anthology film has eight different directors who are allowed to develop their script as they see fit. It follows Jane, who tumbles through a gauntlet of surreal, beautiful, and heartbreaking adventures, each one more unexpected than the last.

The film premiered at the 2022 Bentonville Film Festival on June 22, 2022. It was released in select theaters and on video on demand on January 13, 2023.

== Plot segments ==
The nine segments that make up the film are as follows:

=== Goodbye* ===
(both directed by Jacobs)

While dropping off her daughter Molly at a summer camp for the first time, Jane encourages her reticent child to engage in new experiences. Jane finds herself heeding her own advice.

=== Jane 2 ===
On the road, Jane stops for a coffee in a diner. She pours herself one, as no one responds to the bell. Suddenly, the diner is full, the customers ask her to serve them, know her name and insist she works there. The confused Jane puts on the apron handed to her marked with her name, but she soon leaves.

Outside, two thugs demand something from Jane, but she has no idea what they want. Just then, her double, the waitress appears, but claims to be the wrong Jane. The women fight, and the thug does a coin toss to determine which goes with him.

=== Tayo ===
Jane meets with Tayo on the beach. While she is there, she has flashbacks to ten years ago when she and Oliver, the American name he had initially used back then, were last together on a nearby beach. Jane had wanted him to meet her family, but he had abruptly left.

Now, Tayo has invited Jane to where he and his Caribbean band are practising. One of the dancers makes it abundantly clear that they are together. Later on, Tayo and Jane have an honest conversation in which he admits he was not being true to himself back then. She leaves, having gotten closure.

=== Guardian ===
As she is driving, Stan calls Jane, telling her that Sybil is in the hospital and will not survive the night. As she heads to the hospital in the night, she has a dream sequence in which the two dance together in her headlights. We see flashbacks to when Jane and Sybil spent time together, dancing and biking. Stan calls her back to let her know that she died, but assures her Sybil loved her. The saddened Jane curls up and falls asleep in the backseat.

=== The lonesome road ===
A lonely Jane picks up hitchhiker Valentina along a desert highway. Free-spirited, she does not let anything or anyone tie her down. Jane believes Valentina ought to feel lonely, but she is content to not form relationships. Jane has anxiety driving on the freeway that at any moment she could drop into an abyss.

Both women, feeling thirsty, stop to buy water from a vendor. However, when they start to approach him, he vanishes. Jane believes it is just a mirage, but it rattles Valentina. Also, Jane mentioning she is temporarily escaping her life makes her nervous. Soon afterwards, Valentina asks to be let out, as she sees a couple of attractive guys alongside the road.

=== Rose ===
Driving through a Hispanic town, Jane offers to help Rose, a dressed up teen. She tries to glue her broken heel, while the teen complains her grandmother is making her do her quinceañera, although the family has been in the US for over a century. They go to a street market, seeking new shoes. Rose explains that she feels between cultures, as neither Americans nor Mexican-Americans accept her.

Jane encourages Rose to 'own' her quinceañera, so she buys low-heeled lace-ups and puts pink streaks in her black hair. Then Rose encourages Jane to release people who have wronged her by screaming from a rooftop. Both are happier having met.

=== The one who got away ===
Jane comes across Michael as he is jogging in her neighborhood. He is in town for a conference, and they have not seen each other for eight years when they spent the night together, then he 'ghosted' her, except for the occasional late night DM.

Hiking nearby, at first Michael says that maybe in another lifetime they would have worked out. Jane starts crying, so he kisses her. Soon he confesses he had noticed her since she had started at his high school in the seventh grade. After more kissing, although Michael's marriage is finally OK and he has two small children, he proposes they run off together. Jane says they cannot do that to his kids, and drives away.

=== The audition ===
Jane is called for an audition in a columbarium. The surreal experience shows her extreme anxiety, after which, she curls up into a ball and falls asleep in a car.

=== Hello* ===
After drying her eyes, Jane picks up Molly from camp. They both have grown with their experiences.

== Cast ==
- Gillian Jacobs as Jane
  - Angelina Capozzoli as young Jane
- Breeda Wool as Jane B
- Emanuela Postacchini as Valentina
- Anthony Skordi as Pinky
- Leticia LaBelle as Mom
- Benjamin Hjelm as Cemetery John
- Chido Nwokocha as Tayo
- Sybil Azur
- Kamori Clark-McGeoy as Young Sibyl
- Daniela Hernandez
- Joel McHale
- Caroline Ducrocq
- Soledad St. Hilaire
- Joni Reiss

== Production ==
Principal photography on the film began on August 25, 2021, during the COVID-19 pandemic. Filming concluded on September 8, 2021, over 15 days.

== Reception ==
The Seven Faces of Jane has an approval rating of 35% on review aggregator website Rotten Tomatoes, based on 23 reviews, and an average rating of 5.2/10. Metacritic assigned the film a weighted average score of 47 out of 100, based on 5 critics, indicating "mixed or average reviews".
