= Specialist (short story) =

1953 short story by Robert Sheckley

"Specialist" is a science fiction short story by American writer Robert Sheckley. It was first published in 1953 and has appeared in various collections, including Untouched by Human Hands (1954) and The Golden Age of Science Fiction, edited by Kingsley Amis in 1981.

== Plot ==
A galactic deep-space cargo bioship is blown off course by a photon storm. When the crew recover, they find themselves in an unexplored region of space and their only member of the Pusher race, which allows the ship to travel faster than light, is dead.

The Crew comprises varied members of vastly different intelligent races, all in close mental rapport known as the Cooperation, and serving specialized functions; they are known as Engine, Thinker, Eye etc. But without a Pusher, they cannot sustain FTL speeds and are unlikely to reach home before most of the crew die of old age. They manage to locate a planet rich in primitive Pushers, Earth. The crew try to communicate with a man they find, but he is so violent and resistant that they are forced to bring him on board the ship to try to reason with him. The Crew, used to close cooperation, find it hard to understand his mistrust and fear.

Gradually, the man begins to realize the nature of the Crew and the pleasure to be found as a part of the Cooperation. He agrees to join the crew. Hesitantly at first, he tries to push and finally learns how it is done. The ship speeds away.
