= Riff Raff (2024 film) =

Film by Dito Montiel

- Theatrical release poster
- Directed by: Dito Montiel
- Written by: John Pollono
- Produced by: Noah Rothman; Sarah Gabriel; Marc Goldberg; Adam Paulsen
- Starring: Jennifer Coolidge; Ed Harris; Gabrielle Union; Lewis Pullman; Miles J. Harvey; Emanuela Postacchini; Michael Angelo Covino; Pete Davidson; Bill Murray
- Cinematography: Xavier Grobet
- Edited by: Tim Streeto
- Music by: Adam Taylor
- Production companies: Canopy Pictures; Signature Films
- Distributed by: Roadside Attractions; Grindstone Entertainment Group
- Release dates: September 9, 2024 (Toronto); February 28, 2025 (United States)
- Running time: 103 minutes
- Country: United States
- Language: English
- Box office: $1.9 million

Riff Raff is a 2024 American crime comedy film directed by Dito Montiel and written by John Pollono. Starring Jennifer Coolidge, Ed Harris, Gabrielle Union, Lewis Pullman, Miles J. Harvey, Emanuela Postacchini, Michael Angelo Covino, Pete Davidson, and Bill Murray, the film follows Vincent Gauthier (Harris), an ex-criminal living a quiet life with his wife Sandy (Union) and stepson DJ (Harvey). While celebrating the holidays at their vacation home in Yarmouth, Maine, they must contend with the unexpected arrival of Vincent's ex-wife Ruth (Coolidge), their son Rocco (Pullman), and his pregnant girlfriend Marina (Postacchini).

Riff Raff premiered in the Special Presentations section at the Toronto International Film Festival on September 9, 2024, and was theatrically released in the United States on February 28, 2025, to mixed reviews from critics.

== Plot ==
Before starting college, DJ spends the holidays with his mother Sandy and elderly stepfather Vincent at their vacation home in rural Maine. Vincent confides to DJ that his birth father, who died before DJ was born, had been cheating on his mother, and that Sandy deserved better.

During the night, DJ's stepbrother and Vincent's oldest son Rocco unexpectedly arrives, along with Rocco's heavily pregnant girlfriend Marina and his mother Ruth. The next day is very awkward, and secrets spill out as agitations amongst the blended family arise.

Ruth unsuccessfully propositions Vincent. Rocco tells DJ how he fell in love with Marina at first sight. Ruth recounts how criminals Leftie and Lonnie threatened her at her apartment while trying to find Rocco. Rocco explains to Vincent the trouble he's in, having killed gangster Johnny while Johnny was drunkenly threatening to kill Marina, Johnny's ex-girlfriend. Believing that they are safe, as the vacation home is owned through an alias, Vincent promises to get Rocco money the next day so that he and Marina can disappear and start a new life.

Leftie and Lonnie search for Vincent and Rocco, meeting extremely helpful people whom they casually kill. Provided directions, they arrive at the vacation home and hold everyone at gunpoint in the living room as Leftie laments the death of Johnny, his son. Leftie recounts his last conversation with Johnny, the day before he was killed: Johnny explained how he and Marina ended their relationship after failing to conceive a child, and after she became pregnant by Rocco he had himself tested and learned he was infertile and cannot produce an heir to carry on their family. Leftie had responded with ridicule and disowned Johnny.

Leftie seeks retribution, ordering Lonnie to kill Ruth and Rocco outside. Leftie tells the others that Vincent used to be a contract killer, and that Vincent killed DJ's father and made it look like an accident. Leftie encourages DJ to kill Vincent. However, DJ shoots Leftie instead and Vincent follows with several fatal shots.

Rocco stumbles inside, warning the others so that Vincent kills Lonnie. Sandy then aims a gun at Vincent. However, it is Ruth who shoots Vincent, saying that Vincent should have loved her instead.

Weeks later, Vincent awakens from a coma. The extended family gather around a table, including Rocco and Marina's newborn baby. Vincent holds the child and smiles, as DJ's voice speaks on the importance of family.

== Cast ==
- Jennifer Coolidge as Ruth, Vincent's ex-wife
- Ed Harris as Vincent
- Gabrielle Union as Sandy, Vincent's current wife
- Miles J. Harvey as DJ
- Emanuela Postacchini as Marina, Rocco's girlfriend
- Lewis Pullman as Rocco, Vincent and Ruth's son
- Bill Murray as Leftie Hannigan
- Pete Davidson as Lonnie, Hannigan's henchman
- Michael Angelo Covino as Johnnie, Hannigan's son
- Scott Michael Campbell as Old Mainer
- Roger Guenveur Smith as Sandy's father
- Lucinda Carr as Sandy's mother
- Brooke Dillman as Janet
- P.J. Byrne as Garrison

== Production ==
Producers are Canopy Media Partners' Noah Rothman and Signature Films' Marc Goldberg and Sarah Gabriel. In May 2023, Dustin Hoffman, Jennifer Coolidge, Gabrielle Union, and Brian Cox were cast in the film. In November 2023, Ed Harris, Lewis Pullman, Miles J. Harvey, and Pete Davidson joined the cast, with Harris replacing Cox. In December 2023, it was revealed that Bill Murray had joined the cast replacing Hoffman. In May 2024, it was revealed that Emanuela Postacchini joined the cast.

Principal photography was slated to begin in September 2023. By November 2023, filming was underway in New Jersey.

== Release ==
Riff Raff premiered at the Toronto International Film Festival on September 9, 2024. It played at the Victoria Film Festival on February 16, 2025. It was released in the United States on February 28, 2025, by Roadside Attractions and Grindstone Entertainment Group.

== Reception ==
=== Box office ===
In the United States and Canada, Riff Raff opened alongside Last Breath, Mobile Suit Gundam GQuuuuuuX: Beginning, My Dead Friend Zoe, and A Sloth Story. The film grossed $911,053 from 1,004 theaters, finishing 11th at the box office during the weekend of February 28–March 2.

=== Critical response ===
On the review aggregator website Rotten Tomatoes, 56% of 63 critics' reviews are positive, with an average rating of 6.1/10. The website's consensus reads: "Riff Raff assembles an incredible cast who are a pleasure to be around, but it should be a bit more fun with this much comedic talent involved." Metacritic, which uses a weighted average, assigned the film a score of 48 out of 100, based on 15 critics, indicating "mixed or average" reviews.
