= Before Eden =

- Short story by Arthur C. Clarke
- Genre: Science fiction

Publication
- Published in: Amazing Stories
- Publication type: Periodical
- Media type: Print
- Publication date: June 1961

"Before Eden" is a science fiction short story by the British author Arthur C. Clarke, first published in June 1961 in Amazing Stories. It was included in Tales of Ten Worlds, a 1962 collection of stories by Clarke, and has been translated into multiple languages.

The story, written when speculation about Venus was based entirely on observations from Earth, describes what the environment on the planet's surface could be like. A consequence of interplanetary contamination is imagined.

== Plot summary ==
Jerry Garfield, engineer-navigator, Graham Hutchins, a biologist, and George Coleman, a scientist, have travelled to Venus on the spaceship Morning Star, and are exploring, in a scout car, the surface of Venus. Above are permanent unbroken clouds. They are on the Hesperian Plateau, hoping to reach the South Pole. Thirty miles from the pole, their progress is stopped by an escarpment. They see a dried-up waterfall on the cliff ahead, evidence of lakes above: they realize that here, on a plateau near the pole, the temperature is low enough for rain, although it will be boiling. Garfield reminds the others that "wherever life has the slightest chance of surviving, you'll find it. This is the only chance it's ever had on Venus."

Garfield and Hutchins leave the car and, wearing their thermosuits, climb the escarpment. They follow a dry river bed and reach a lake, the first free water found on Venus. What seems to be a horizontal patch of black rock at the edge of the lake is moving. The plant, or colony of plants, seems to be approaching them, but retreats when they move forward, a reaction to the heat expelled from the thermosuits' refrigeration units. Hutchins takes samples and photographs of the moving carpet, and speculates on its nature. They erect a pressurized tent and relax; "the true wonder and importance of the discovery forced itself upon their minds".

There is a short final section, like an epilogue, with a detached viewpoint: After Garfield and Hutchins have left, the organism reaches the abandoned encampment and absorbs the organic material from the human waste, cigarette ends and paper cups; bacteria and viruses begin to kill it. "Beneath the clouds of Venus, the story of Creation was ended."

== Relationship with other works ==
The story played a part in the development of Clarke's 1968 novel 2001: A Space Odyssey. During 1964, Clarke and Stanley Kubrick were working on the story for the film, and it was at first envisaged that the discovery of an extraterrestrial object would be the climax. "Before Eden" was one of several of Clarke's short stories sold to Kubrick, to provide background material for the exploration of the Solar System before its discovery. It was later decided that the extraterrestrial object would be found early in the story, and the short stories were discarded; the following year, Clarke bought them back from Kubrick.

== Release ==
"Before Eden" was first published in the June 1961 issue of Amazing Stories. The following year it was one of the stories collected in Clarke's Tales of Ten Worlds, released through Harcourt Brace. "Before Eden" has also been included in collections and anthologies such as The Starlit Corridor, Yet More Penguin Science Fiction, and The Nine Billion Names of God.

The story has been translated into multiple languages that include German, Italian, French, Russian, Dutch, Serbian and Croatian.

== Adaptations ==
In 2005 the story was read on BBC Radio 4 by Tim Pigott-Smith.

== See also ==
- Venus in fiction
- Life on Venus
