= Dramocles: An Intergalactic Soap Opera =

1983 novel by Robert Sheckley

Dramocles: An Intergalactic Soap Opera is a science fiction novel by American writer Robert Sheckley, published in 1983.

== Plot summary ==
In the novel, King Dramocles of Glorn uses notes that he did not remember sending to himself in hopes of that they may help him fulfil his unknown destiny.

== Reception ==
Dave Langford reviewed Dramocles: An Intergalactic Soap Opera for White Dwarf #69, staying that it has hilarious scenes, like the completely irrelevant one in which minor characters try to gain narrative security by establish a sub-plot of their own; but overall it reads as though Sheckley was desperately making it up as he went along. Pretty good by some standards; insubstantial by Sheckley's own."

== Reviews ==
- Review by Faren Miller (1983) in Locus, #269 June 1983
- Review by Gene DeWeese (1983) in Science Fiction Review, November 1983
- Review by John Clute (1984) in Foundation, #30 March 1984
- Review [French] by Pierre-Noël Duillard? (1984) in Fiction, #350
- Review by Tom Easton (1984) in Analog Science Fiction/Science Fact, May 1984
- Review by Brian Stableford (1984) in Fantasy Review, November 1984
- Review by Alan Fraser (1985) in Paperback Inferno, #56
