= The Monsters (short story) =

- Short story by Robert Sheckley
- Country: United States
- Language: English
- Genre: Science fiction short story

Publication
- Published in: F&SF
- Publication type: Periodical
- Media type: Magazine
- Publication date: March 1953

"The Monsters" is a science fiction short story by American writer Robert Sheckley. It was first published in 1953 in F&SF and has appeared in various collections, including Untouched by Human Hands (1954) and The Starlit Corridor, edited by Roger Mansfield in 1967. The story deals with first contact between human beings and an alien species, as told from the point of view of the aliens.

== Plot ==
A distant planet is inhabited by sentient aliens that call themselves "humans," although they bear little physical resemblance to humans from Earth; they are vaguely reptilian in nature, oviparous, with smooth bodies, cyclopean eyes, tails, and tentacled limbs. While the aliens consider themselves to be both rational and ethical beings, they are highly argumentative, inclined toward physical violence, and routinely kill each other over even minor disagreements. They also hold the concept of truth in high regard, and consider lying - telling a "deliberate untruth" - to be a grievous, blasphemous crime.

The aliens have a patriarchal social structure in which females are regarded as an expendable resource. This is due to a severe population imbalance; on average, around eight females are hatched for every male. As a result, females are effectively treated as livestock, with nameless "surplus" females kept in pens until a male is ready to take one as his wife. The wife tends to the male's home, gathers and prepares food, and lays eggs over a period of 25 days; on the 25th day, the female is summarily executed, and the male recruits another wife from the pens. Both sexes regard this arrangement as entirely logical and perfectly moral.

One day, a spaceship arrives carrying a group of human explorers (from Earth). They are described as hideous monsters, from the aliens' perspective. The aliens deduce from the appearance and operation of their spaceship that humans are probably intelligent, but wonder if they also possess any concept of truth and morality. When the humans attempt to communicate, Hum, an adolescent alien, volunteers to learn their language. Over the next few weeks, Hum develops rudimentary communication with the humans. He informs the other aliens that the humans mean no harm and would like to visit their village. Hum also notes that human females may be differentiated from males by way of their "very red mouths" (i.e., lipstick).

The next day - the 25th after their arrival - the humans visit the alien village in order to observe their behavior. During their survey, Rantan, a village elder, casually kills his wife, shocking the humans. Rantan then kills a human woman (having concluded that since the humans have not yet killed any of their own females, they may be inviting others to do so), prompting the humans to retaliate by killing him with a ray gun. After another alien kills his wife in plain view of the landing party, the clearly distressed humans communicate a demand that no more females be killed. The aliens react in total disbelief, as the very idea of not killing their wives violates their every social norm. The humans make a fighting retreat toward their spaceship, killing many aliens in the process.

This incident enrages the aliens, both male and female alike, who are now convinced that the humans are murderous monsters and liars besides, seeking to corrupt their society and undermine their traditional values. They attack the human landing site en masse, hurling boulders at the spaceship, and are met by weapons fire as the ship lifts off and leaves the planet. Over 50 females and more than a dozen males are killed in the fighting. The aliens speculate about where the humans have gone and muse that the loss of so many males will make it necessary to kill their wives sooner than every 25th day, "just until things get back to normal." From their place in the pens, the surviving females wildly applaud.
