= Feeding Time =

2014 video game by Incubator Games

- Developer: Incubator Games
- Publisher: Incubator Games
- Platform: iOS
- Release: June 25, 2014

Feeding Time is an indie iOS video game developed by Incubator Games and released on June 25, 2014.

== Gameplay ==
Feeding Time is a grid-based puzzle video game about feeding animals. The user taps on animal heads that will "eat" food icons that are matched to their color. Multiple combo chains can be started at once, allowing players to rapidly score points within the 90-second time limit. Players are tasked with various challenges to accomplish, which can unlock bonus mini-games and earn experience which gains access to power-ups. There are three levels in the game, including a backyard, safari and tundra.

== Reception ==
Reviews have been generally positive. Gamezebo gave the game a score of 9/10, saying "If a complaint can be levelled at Feeding Time, it'd be that unlocking new stages takes a long time, and a lot of games. There's no free to play-style energy system to contend with, however, so you can put in plenty of games." Post Arcade wrote "Despite falling into a genre and being released on the kind of gaming platform I typically ignore, I've found Feeding Time's gameplay to be surprisingly compelling." AppAdvice likewise had a positive impression of the game, but agreed with Gamezebo that unlocking extra features took too long.

Feeding Time received several award nominations for the 2014 Canadian Videogame Awards, including Best iOS Game.
