= Pilgrimage to Earth =

1957 collection of science fiction short stories by Robert Sheckley

- Cover of the first edition
- Author: Robert Sheckley
- Language: English
- Genre: Science fiction
- Publisher: Bantam Books
- Publication date: 1957
- Publication place: United States
- Media type: Print (paperback)
- Preceded by: Citizen in Space
- Followed by: Notions: Unlimited

Pilgrimage to Earth is a collection of science fiction short stories by Robert Sheckley. It was first published in 1957 by Bantam Books (catalogue number 1672). It includes the following stories (magazines in which the stories originally appeared given in parentheses):

1. "Pilgrimage to Earth" (Playboy 1956/9; also known as "Love, Incorporated")
2. "All the Things You Are" (Galaxy 1956/7)
3. "Trap" (Galaxy 1956/2)
4. "The Body" (Galaxy 1956/1)
5. "Early Model" (Galaxy 1956/8)
6. "Disposal Service" (Bluebook 1955/1)
7. "Human Man's Burden" (Galaxy 1956/9)
8. "Fear in the Night" (Today's Woman 1952)
9. "Bad Medicine" (Galaxy 1956/7)
10. "Protection" (Galaxy 1956/4)
11. "Earth, Air, Fire and Water" (Astounding 1955/7)
12. "Deadhead" (Galaxy 1955/7)
13. "The Academy" (If 1954/8)
14. "Milk Run" (Galaxy 1954/9)
15. "The Lifeboat Mutiny" (Galaxy 1955/4)
