= Wait/walk dilemma =

Problem about bus travel

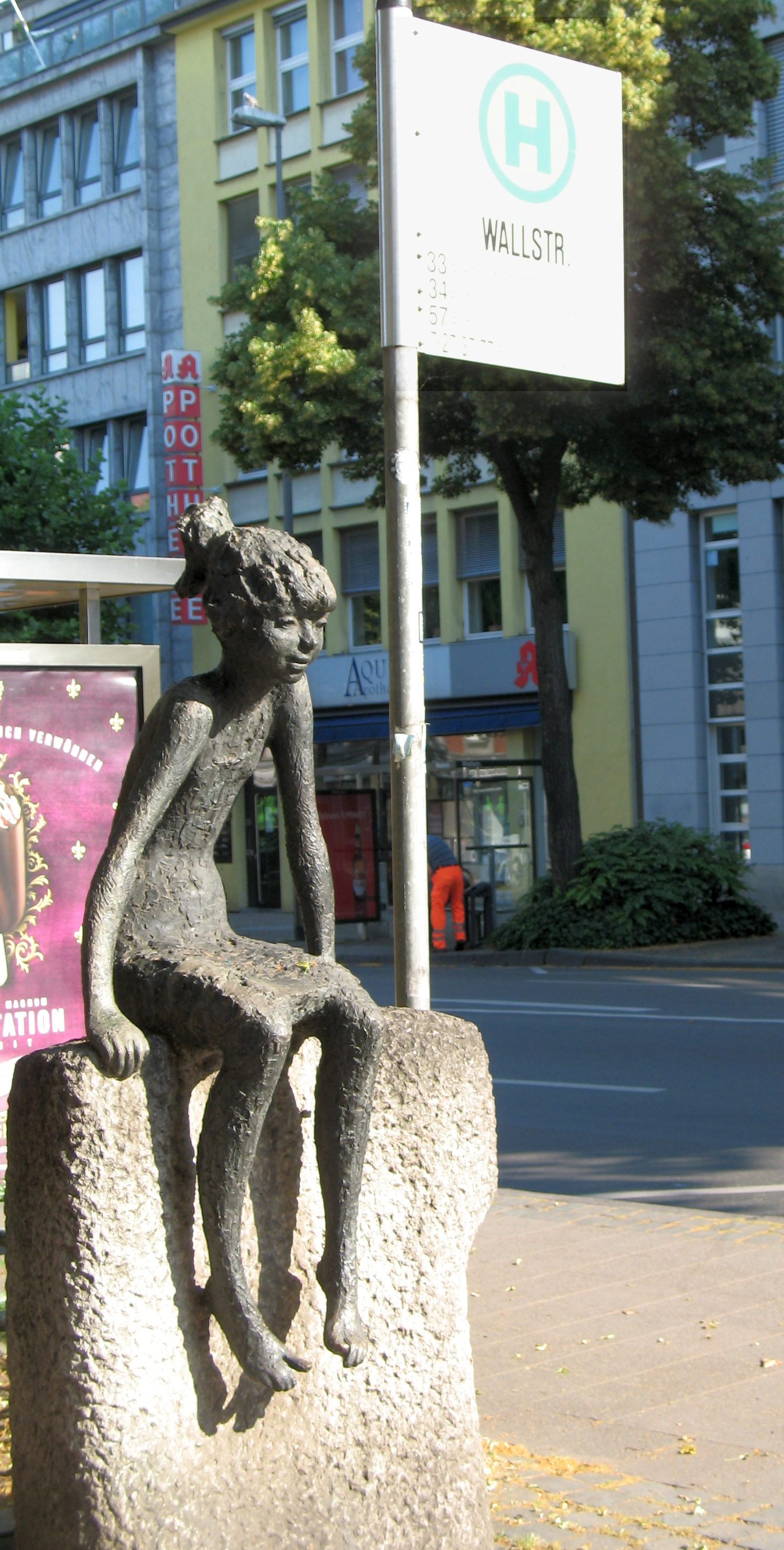
Waiting girl sculpture at a bus stop in Aachen, Germany

The wait/walk dilemma occurs when waiting for a bus at a bus stop, when the duration of the wait may exceed the time needed to arrive at a destination by another means, especially walking. Some work on this problem was featured in the 2008 "Year in Ideas" issue of The New York Times Magazine.

== Research ==
The dilemma has been studied in an unpublished report entitled "Walk Versus Wait: The Lazy Mathematician Wins." Anthony B. Morton's paper "A Note on Walking Versus Waiting" supports and extends Chen et al.'s results. Ramnik Arora's "A Note on Walk versus Wait: Lazy Mathematician Wins" discusses what he believes to be some of the errors in Chen et al.'s argument; the result of Chen et al.'s paper still holds following Arora's alleged corrections. As early as 1990, writer Tom Parker had observed that "walking is faster than waiting for a bus if you're going less than a mile".

As an undergraduate mathematics major at Harvard, Scott D. Kominers first began fixating on the problem while walking from MIT to Harvard, which are more than a mile apart in Cambridge, Massachusetts along MBTA bus route 1. He enlisted the help of Caltech physics major Justin G. Chen and Harvard statistics major Robert W. Sinnott to perform the analysis.

Their paper concludes that it is usually mathematically quicker to wait for the bus, at least for a little while. But once made, the decision to walk should be final instead of waiting again at subsequent stops. The paper also showed potential applications to the field of cryptography.

== Interstellar travel ==
The corresponding problem in interstellar travel is called the wait calculation, which tries to determine the optimal time to wait for technological progress to improve spaceship speeds before committing to the journey.

== See also ==
- Bus bunching
- Rendezvous problem
