= The People Trap =

Short story collection by Robert Sheckley

The People Trap and other Pitfalls, Snares, Devices and Delusions, as Well as Two Sniggles and a Contrivance
- First edition
- Author: Robert Sheckley
- Language: English
- Genre: Science fiction
- Publisher: Dell Publishing
- Publication date: 1968

The People Trap (full title The People Trap and other Pitfalls, Snares, Devices and Delusions, as Well as Two Sniggles and a Contrivance) is a collection of science fiction short stories by American writer Robert Sheckley. It was first published in 1968 by Dell.

== Stories ==
It includes the following stories (magazines in which the stories originally appeared given in parentheses):

- "The People Trap" (The Magazine of Fantasy & Science Fiction 1968/6)
- "The Victim from Space" (Galaxy 1957/4)
- "Shall We Have a Little Talk?" (Galaxy 1965/10)
- "Restricted Area" (Amazing Stories 1953/6&7)
- "The Odor of Thought" (Star Science Fiction Stories No.2, edited by Frederik Pohl, 1953)
- "The Necessary Thing" (Galaxy 1955/6)
- "Redfern's Labyrinth"
- "Proof of the Pudding" (Galaxy 1952/8)
- "The Laxian Key" (Galaxy 1954/11)
- "The Last Weapon" (Star Science Fiction Stories No.1, edited by Frederik Pohl, 1953)
- "Fishing Season" (Thrilling Wonder Stories 1953/8)
- "Dreamworld"
- "Diplomatic Immunity" (Galaxy 1953/8)
- "Ghost V" (Galaxy 1954/10)
