= Store of Infinity =

Collection of science fiction short stories

- Author: Robert Sheckley
- Publisher: Bantam Books
- Publication date: 1960

Store of Infinity is a collection of science fiction short stories by Robert Sheckley. It was first published in 1960 by Bantam Books. It includes the following stories:

1. "The Prize of Peril"
2. "The Humours" (first published as "Join Now" by Finn O'Donnevan)
3. "Triplication"
4. "The Minimum Man"
5. "If the Red Slayer"
6. "The Store of the Worlds" (also known as "World of Heart's Desire")
7. "The Gun Without a Bang"
8. "The Deaths of Ben Baxter"
