= Don't Panic: The Official Hitchhiker's Guide to the Galaxy Companion =

1986 book by Neil Gaiman

- Book cover - United States edition
- Author: Neil Gaiman; David K. Dickson; M. J. Simpson; Guy Adams
- Language: English
- Subject: Science fiction
- Genre: Non-fiction
- Publisher: Simon & Schuster
- Publication date: 1988
- Publication place: United States and United Kingdom
- Media type: Print (hardback & paperback)
- Pages: 208
- ISBN: 0-671-66426-3
- OCLC: 17932973

Don't Panic: The Official Hitchhiker's Guide to the Galaxy Companion is a book by Neil Gaiman about Douglas Adams and The Hitchhiker's Guide to the Galaxy. The book was originally published in 1986 in the United States and United Kingdom (ISBN 1-85286-013-8) by Titan Books.

A second edition, retitled Don't Panic: Douglas Adams & The Hitch Hiker's Guide to the Galaxy was published in the United Kingdom in July 1993, containing additional material by David K. Dickson (ISBN 1-85286-411-7).

A third edition, with another slight title revision (now known as Don't Panic: Douglas Adams & The Hitchhiker's Guide to the Galaxy) was published in the UK by Titan Books in June 2002, and contains further additional material, this time by M. J. Simpson (ISBN 1-84023-501-2).

An updated edition was published by Titan Books in October 2003 (ISBN 1-84023-742-2).

A further edition was published by Titan Books in September 2009 (ISBN 9781848564961).
