= Untouched by Human Hands =

1954 collection of science fiction short stories by Robert Sheckley

- Cover of the first paperback edition, illustration by Jack Coggins
- Author: Robert Sheckley
- Language: English
- Genre: Science fiction
- Publisher: Ballantine Books
- Publication date: 1954
- Publication place: United States
- Media type: print (paperback)
- Pages: 169
- ISBN: 978-1-345-00437-3
- Followed by: Citizen in Space

Untouched by Human Hands is a collection of science fiction short stories by American writer Robert Sheckley. It was first published in 1954 simultaneously by Ballantine Books (catalogue number 73), both in hardback and paperback.

== Contents ==
The collection includes the following stories (magazines in which the stories originally appeared given in parentheses):

- "The Monsters" (The Magazine of Fantasy & Science Fiction, March 1953)
- "Cost of Living" (Galaxy, December 1952)
- "The Altar" (Fantastic, July/August 1953)
- "Keep Your Shape" (Galaxy, November 1953; also known as "Shape")
- "The Impacted Man" (Astounding SF, December 1952)
- "Untouched by Human Hands" (Galaxy, December 1953; also known as "One Man's Poison")
- "The King's Wishes" (F&SF, July 1953)
- "Warm" (Galaxy, June 1953)
- "The Demons" (Fantasy Magazine, March 1953)
- "Specialist" (Galaxy, May 1953)
- "Seventh Victim" (Galaxy, April 1953)
- "Ritual" (Climax, 1953; also known as "Strange Ritual")
- "Beside Still Waters" (Amazing Stories, October/November 1953)

== Reception ==
Critic Groff Conklin reviewed the collection for Galaxy Science Fiction in 1954; although generally favorable, the review claimed that Sheckley was "still trying to discover his own particular bent" and that he "hasn't quite found his footing." Sheckley himself, according to a 1980 interview, was aware of the extreme stylistic diversity of the collection and the fact that some stories were not science fiction in the usual sense of the word:

I felt I wasn't really writing science fiction. I was in some way writing a commentary on science fiction, and this sometimes made me feel, a little sadly, that I was not really into it.

Writing in The New York Times, Villiers Gerson wrote that Sheckley was "a writer not quite like any other [whose] forte is his own brand of strange and wonderful humor."Boucher and McComas found it "as brightly individual and entrancing a group of science-fantasies as we've seen in some time." P. Schuyler Miller compared Sheckley to Ray Bradbury, citing his "fresh point of view", his "wry distortions of the familiar", and his "touch of the same poetry." Science fiction historian Michael Ashley, in his 2005 volume on the history of science fiction magazines, praised Sheckley's early work, including "Untouched by Human Hands", for the "sheer lack of sophistication—his ability to run circles around the establishment. [...] Sheckley's work highlights the fact that man's worst enemy is himself."

== Publication history ==
The collection was reprinted several times by different publishers. In 1965 the story "Seventh Victim" was adapted into The 10th Victim, an Italian film starring Marcello Mastroianni and Ursula Andress, also known as La decima vittima. Sheckley wrote a novelization of the film in 1966 (The Tenth Victim), and, in late 1980s, two more novels set in the same world.
