= Can You Feel Anything When I Do This? =

Book by Robert Sheckley

- First edition cover
- Author: Robert Sheckley
- Cover artist: Margo Herr
- Language: English
- Genre: science fiction short stories
- Publisher: Doubleday Books
- Publication date: 1971
- Publication place: United States
- Media type: Print (hardback & paperback)
- Pages: 191
- OCLC: 214909

Can You Feel Anything When I Do This? is a collection of fantasy and science fiction short stories by American writer Robert Sheckley, published in December 1971 by Doubleday. It was also published by Pan Books under title The Same To You Doubled.

== Stories ==
The book contains the following stories (magazines in which the stories originally appeared given in parentheses):

- "The Same to You Doubled" (Playboy 1970/3)
- "Cordle to Onion to Carrot" (Playboy 1969/12)
- "The Petrified World" (If 1968/2)
- "Game: First Schematic"
- "Doctor Zombie and His Little Furry Friends"
- "The Cruel Equations"
- "Can You Feel Anything When I Do This?" (Playboy 1969/8)
- "Starting from Scratch" (The Magazine of Fantasy & Science Fiction 1970/11)
- "The Mnemone"
- "Tripout"
- "Notes on the Perception of Imaginary Differences"
- "Down the Digestive Tract and into the Cosmos with Mantra, Tantra and Specklebang" (Galaxy 1971/2)
- "Pas de Trois of the Chef and the Waiter and the Customer" (Playboy 1971/8)
- "Aspects of Langranak"
- "Plague Circuit"

== Reception ==
Theodore Sturgeon, reviewing the collection for The New York Times, said "[Sheckley] is a reliable writer who enjoys what he says, and so will you."
