= Citizen in Space =

1955 collection of science fiction short stories by Robert Sheckley

- First edition
- Author: Robert Sheckley
- Cover artist: Richard M. Powers
- Language: English
- Genre: Science fiction
- Publisher: Ballantine Books
- Publication date: 1955
- Publication place: United States
- Media type: Print (paperback)
- ISBN: 978-0-441-10595-3 (US edition), 978-0-450-00230-4 (UK edition)
- Preceded by: Untouched by Human Hands
- Followed by: Pilgrimage to Earth

Citizen in Space is a collection of science fiction short stories by American writer Robert Sheckley. It was first published in 1955 by Ballantine Books (catalogue number 126).

== Contents ==
The book includes the following stories (magazines in which the stories originally appeared given in parentheses):

- "The Mountain Without a Name" (1955)
- "The Accountant" (The Magazine of Fantasy & Science Fiction, July 1954)
- "Hunting Problem" (Galaxy, September 1955)
- "A Thief in Time" (Galaxy, July 1954)
- "The Luckiest Man in the World" (Fantastic Universe 1955/2; also known as "Fortunate Person")
- "Hands Off" (Galaxy, April 1954)
- "Something for Nothing" (Galaxy, June 1954)
- "A Ticket to Tranai" (Galaxy, October 1955)
- "The Battle" (If, September 1954)
- "Skulking Permit" (Galaxy, December 1954)
- "Citizen in Space" (Playboy September 1955; also known as "Spy Story")
- "Ask a Foolish Question" (Science Fiction Stories No. 1, 1953)

== Reception ==
Galaxy reviewer Floyd C. Gale praised the stories as "very high in inventiveness, ingenuity and reader appeal."
