= The Robot Who Looked Like Me =

Collection of sci-fi short stories by Robert Sheckley

- First edition Cover art by Peter Goodfellow
- Author: Robert Sheckley
- Language: English
- Publisher: Sphere Books
- Publication date: 1978

The Robot Who Looked Like Me is a collection of science fiction short stories by Robert Sheckley. It was first published in 1978 by Sphere Books. As with much of Sheckley's work in general, many of the stories are satirical and express the writer's criticism of modern American society.

It includes the following stories (magazines in which the stories originally appeared given in parentheses):

1. "The Robot Who Looked Like Me" (Cosmopolitan, 1973) A man builds a robot version of himself to free up extra spare time.
2. "Slaves of Time" (Nova 4, 1974)
3. "Voices" (Playboy, Oct 1973)
4. "A Supplicant in Space" (Galaxy, Nov 1973, as "A Suppliant in Space".)
5. "Zirn Left Unguarded, The Jenghik Palace in Flames, Jon Westerly Dead" (Nova 2, 1972) A status report from a military outpost in space.
6. "Sneak Previews" (Penthouse, Aug 1977)
7. "Welcome to the Standard Nightmare" (Nova 3, 1973)
8. "End City" (Galaxy, May 1974, with a different ending.)
9. "The Never-Ending Western Movie" (Science Fiction Discoveries, 1976) A day in the life of a television star who has been featured in a western for the last 20+ years.
10. "What is Life?" (Playboy, Dec 1976) A traveler in Nepal is asked the title question by a Voice from the mountain
11. "I See a Man Sitting on a Chair, and the Chair is Biting His Leg" (The Magazine of Fantasy & Science Fiction, Jan 1968; co-authored with Harlan Ellison, although Ellison is not credited in the book edition) Concerns a man who is chased through a futuristic Las Vegas-like city by inanimate objects with an unnatural affection for him.
12. "Is That What People Do?" (Anticipations, 1978) A man finds a pair of binoculars and uses them to observe people in nearby highrise buildings.
13. "Silversmith Wishes" (Playboy, May 1977)

== See also ==
- Robots (2023 film)
