= Shards of Space =

1962 collection of short stories by Robert Sheckley

- Author: Robert Sheckley
- Publisher: Bantam Books
- Publication date: 1962

Shards of Space is a collection of science fiction short stories by American writer Robert Sheckley. It was first published in 1962 by Bantam Books.

== Contents ==
The collection includes the following stories (magazines in which the stories originally appeared given in parentheses):

- "Prospector's Special" (Galaxy, December 1959)
- "The Girls and Nugent Miller" (The Magazine of Fantasy & Science Fiction, March 1960)
- "Meeting of the Minds" (Galaxy, February 1960)
- "Potential" (Astounding SF, November 1953)
- "Fool's Mate" (Astounding SF, March 1953)
- "Subsistence Level" (Galaxy, August 1954, under the pseudonym Finn O'Donnevan)
- "The Slow Season" (F&SF, October 1954)
- "Alone at Last" (Infinity Science Fiction, February 1957)
- "Forever" (Galaxy, February 1959, under the pseudonym Ned Lang)
- "The Sweeper of Loray" (Galaxy, April 1959)
- "The Special Exhibit" (Esquire, October 1953)

== Reception ==
The Hartford Courant reviewed the collection favorably, describing Sheckley as "one of the best in the science-fantasy field."
