= Notions: Unlimited =

1960 collection of science fiction short stories by Robert Sheckley

- First edition cover
- Author: Robert Sheckley
- Language: English
- Genre: Science fiction
- Publisher: Bantam
- Publication date: 1960
- Publication place: United States

Notions: Unlimited is a collection of science fiction short stories by American writer Robert Sheckley. It was first published in 1960 by Bantam Books.

== Contents ==
The collection includes the following stories (the original publication is given in parentheses):

- "Gray Flannel Armor" (Galaxy SF 1957/11)
- "The Leech" (Galaxy SF, 12/1952)
- "Watchbird" (Galaxy SF, 2/1953)
- "A Wind Is Rising" (Galaxy SF, 7/1957)
- "Morning After" (Galaxy SF, 11/1957)
- "The Native Problem" (Galaxy SF, 12/1956)
- "Feeding Time" (Fantasy Magazine, 2/1953)
- "Paradise II" (Time to Come, collection edited by August Derleth, 1954)
- "Double Indemnity" (Galaxy SF, 10/1957)
- "Holdout" (The Magazine of Fantasy & Science Fiction, 12/1957)
- "Dawn Invader" (The Magazine of Fantasy & Science Fiction, 3/1957)
- "The Language of Love" (Galaxy SF, 5/1957)
