= Robert Sheckley =

American writer

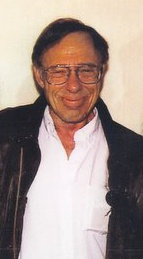
- Sheckley in the mid-1990s
- Born: July 16, 1928; Brooklyn, New York City, U.S.
- Died: December 9, 2005 (aged 77); Poughkeepsie, New York, U.S.
- Occupations: Writer, Humorist
- Writing career
- Period: 1952–2005
- Genres: Science fiction, fantasy, mystery
- Notable works: Immortality, Inc., "Seventh Victim"
- Website: sheckley.com

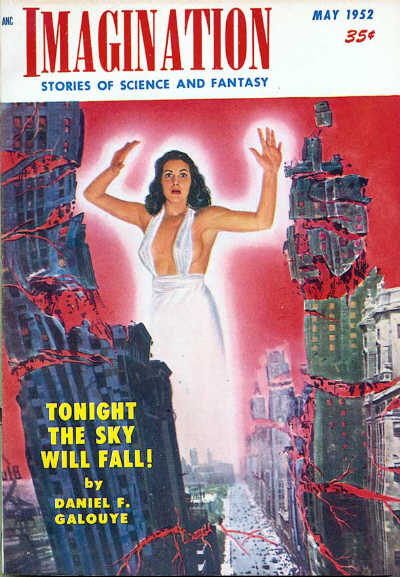
Sheckley's first story, "Final Examination", was published in the May 1952 issue of Imagination

Robert Sheckley (July 16, 1928 – December 9, 2005) was an American writer. First published in the science-fiction magazines of the 1950s, his many quick-witted stories and novels were famously unpredictable, absurdist, and broadly comical.

Nominated for Hugo and Nebula Awards, Sheckley was named Author Emeritus by the Science Fiction and Fantasy Writers of America in 2001.

== Biography ==
Sheckley was born to a Jewish family in Brooklyn, New York City. In 1931, the family moved to Maplewood, New Jersey. Sheckley attended Columbia High School, where he discovered science fiction. He graduated in 1946 and hitchhiked to California the same year, where he tried numerous jobs: landscape gardener, pretzel salesman, barman, milkman, warehouseman, and general laborer "board man" in a hand-painted necktie studio. Still in 1946, he joined the U.S. Army and was sent to Korea. During his time in the army, he served as a guard, an army newspaper editor, a payroll clerk, and as a guitarist in the Army Band. He left the service in 1948.

Sheckley graduated with an arts degree from New York University in 1951. The same year he married, for the first time, to Barbara Scadron. The couple had one son, Jason. Sheckley worked in an aircraft factory and as an assistant metallurgist for a short time, but his breakthrough came quickly: in late 1951, he sold his first story, "Final Examination", to Imagination magazine. He quickly gained prominence as a writer, publishing stories in Imagination, Galaxy, and other science fiction magazines. The 1950s saw the publication of Sheckley's first four books: short story collections Untouched by Human Hands (Ballantine, 1954), Citizen in Space (1955), and Pilgrimage to Earth (Bantam, 1957), and a novel, Immortality, Inc. (first published as a serial in Galaxy, 1958).

Sheckley and Scadron divorced in 1956. The writer married journalist Ziva Kwitney in 1957. The newly married couple lived in Greenwich Village. Their daughter, Alisa Kwitney, born in 1964, would herself become a successful writer. Applauded by critic Kingsley Amis, Sheckley was now selling many of his deft, satiric stories to mainstream magazines such as Playboy. In addition to his science fiction stories, in the 1960s Sheckley started writing suspense fiction. More short story collections and novels appeared in the 1960s, and a film adaptation of an early story by Sheckley, The 10th Victim, was released in 1965.

Sheckley spent much of 1970s living on Ibiza. He and Kwitney divorced in 1972 and the same year Sheckley married Abby Schulman, whom he had met in Ibiza. The couple had two children, Anya and Jed. The couple separated while living in London. In 1980, the writer returned to the United States and became fiction editor of the newly established Omni magazine. Sheckley left Omni in 1981 with his fourth wife, writer Jay Rothbell: they subsequently traveled widely in Europe, finally ending up in Portland, Oregon, where they separated. He married Gail Dana of Portland in 1990. Sheckley continued publishing further science fiction and espionage or mystery stories, and collaborated with other writers including Roger Zelazny, Harlan Ellison and Harry Harrison.

During an April 2005 visit to Ukraine for the Ukrainian Sci-Fi Computer Week, an international event for science fiction writers, Sheckley fell ill and had to be hospitalized in Kyiv. His condition was very serious for a week, but he appeared to be slowly recovering. Sheckley's official website ran a fundraising campaign to help cover his treatment and his return to the United States. He settled in Red Hook, in northern Dutchess County, New York, to be near his daughters Anya and Alisa. On November 20 he had surgery for a brain aneurysm; he died in a Poughkeepsie hospital on December 9, 2005.

== Works ==
Sheckley was a prolific and versatile writer. His works include not only original short stories and novels, but also TV series episodes (Captain Video and His Video Rangers), novelizations of works by others (Babylon 5: A Call to Arms, after the film), stories in shared universes such as Heroes in Hell, and collaborations with other writers. He was best known for his several hundred short stories, which he published in book form as well as individually. Typical Sheckley stories include "Bad Medicine" (in which a man is mistakenly treated by a psychotherapy machine intended for Martians), "Protection" (whose protagonist is warned of deadly danger unless he avoids the common activity of "lesnerizing", a word whose meaning is not explained), and "The Accountant" (in which a family of wizards learns that their son has been taken from them by a more sinister trade—accountancy). In many stories Sheckley speculates about alternative (and usually sinister) social orders, of which a good example is the story "A Ticket to Tranai" (which tells of a sort of Utopia designed for human nature as it actually is, which turns out to have terrible drawbacks).

Sheckley's early stories include the far future AAA Ace detective agency series. In these tales, the two partners face unusual problems often related to human incompetence or laziness.

In the 1990s, Sheckley wrote a series of three mystery novels featuring detective Hob Draconian, as well as novels set in the worlds of Star Trek: Deep Space Nine and Alien. Before his death Sheckley had been commissioned to write an original novel based on the TV series The Prisoner for Powys Media, but died before completing the manuscript.

His novel Dimension of Miracles is often cited as an influence on Douglas Adams's The Hitchhiker's Guide to the Galaxy, although in an interview for Neil Gaiman's book Don't Panic: The Official Hitchhiker's Guide to the Galaxy Companion, Adams said he had not read it until after writing the Guide.

== Film, TV, and radio adaptations ==
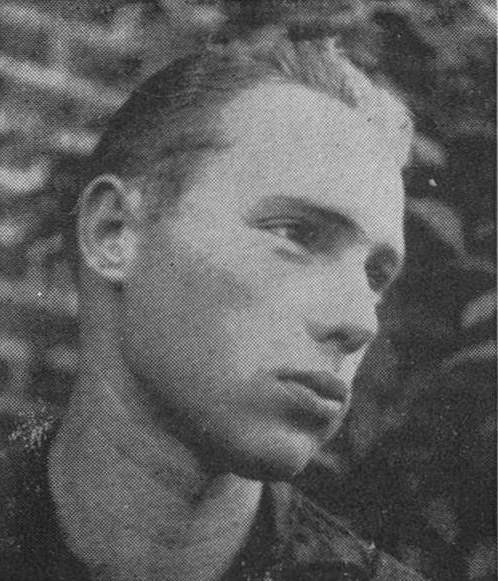
Robert Sheckley c. 1954

One of Sheckley's early works, the April 1953 Galaxy short story "Seventh Victim", was the basis for the film The 10th Victim, also known by the original Italian title La decima vittima. The film starred Marcello Mastroianni and Ursula Andress. A novelization of the film, also written by Sheckley, was published in 1966. The satirical premise is that in the future killings are legal and televised, and that potential victims or hunters can get corporate sponsors and extra perks to assist them in succeeding as a professional, corporate-sponsored, celebrity killer.

His 1953 short story "Watchbird" was adapted for the short-lived TV series Masters of Science Fiction. It did not initially air in the US, but on February 12, 2012, the Science Channel began airing the episodes, under the title Stephen Hawking's Sci-Fi Masters, beginning with the first domestic airing of the episode "Watchbird". It was included on the DVD set for the series.

The 1954 story "Ghost V" and the 1955 story "The Lifeboat Mutiny" were adapted into two episodes of the USSR science fiction TV series This Fantastic World. "Ghost V" was staged also by Estonian TV channel ETV in 1997.

The 1958 short story "The Prize of Peril" was adapted in 1970 as the West German TV movie Das Millionenspiel, and again in 1983 as the French movie Le Prix du Danger. Written about a man who goes on a TV show in which he must evade people out to kill him for a week in order to win a large cash prize, it is perhaps the first-ever published work predicting the advent of reality television. There are many similarities between Sheckley's story and Stephen King's novel The Running Man, published later in 1982, of which a film adaptation was later made.

The 1958 short story "The Store of the Worlds" from the collection Store of Infinity was adapted twice as a short film, first in Hungary in 1975 with its original title translated to Hungarian ("Világok boltja"). The second was titled The Escape by the filmmaker Paul Franklin, starring Julian Sands, Art Malik, Olivia Williams and Ben Miller. This film had its premiere at the 2017 Tribeca Film Festival in New York.

Sheckley's 1959 novel Immortality, Inc.—about a world in which the afterlife could be obtained via a scientific process—was very loosely adapted into a film, the 1992 Freejack, starring Mick Jagger, Emilio Estevez, Rene Russo, and Anthony Hopkins. It was also adapted into the first episode of the third season of the British BBC series Out of the Unknown. This episode is lost due to the then common practice of wiping the shows after broadcast.

His 1962 novel, The Man in the Water was filmed under that title and was also released as Escape from Hell Island.

The Game of X (1965) was loosely adapted as the 1981 Disney film, Condorman.

The 2023 film titled Robots, starring Shailene Woodley is based on the short story "The Robot That Looked Like Me".

A number of Sheckley's works, some of which under the pseudonym "Finn O'Donnevan", were also adapted for the radio show X Minus One in the late 1950s, including the above-mentioned "Seventh Victim," "Bad Medicine," "Protection," and "The Native Problem," the last of which was an exploration of Zimmer's Law, or the waiting time paradox. The radio show Tales of Tomorrow also in the late 1950s did a version of "Watchbird" and South Africa radio did their version of "Watchbird" on the series SF68.

In 2007, Chris Larner and David Gilbert created the radio show "The Laxian Key" based on Sheckley's short stories. It was broadcast on BBC Radio 4 Extra.

== Published works ==
=== Science fiction and fantasy ===
==== Novels ====
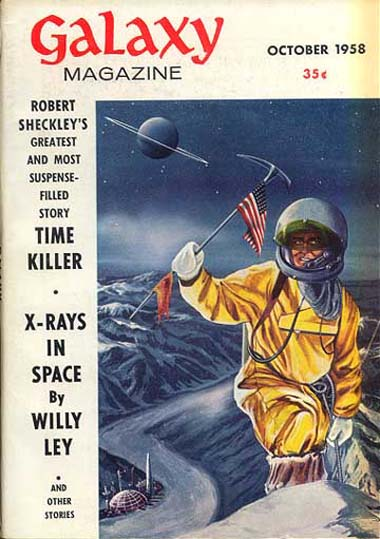
Sheckley's novel Immortality, Inc. was serialized in Galaxy Science Fiction in 1958 as "Time Killer"

- Immortality, Inc., as Immortality Delivered Avalon (1958), Bantam A1991 (1959), Gollancz (1963), Penguin (1978), Ace (1978), Tor (1991)
- The Status Civilization, serialized as Omega. Signet S1840 (1960), Gollancz (1976), Ace (1979), Penguin (1979), Wildside (2007)
- The Man in the Water, Regency (1961)
- Journey Beyond Tomorrow, serialized as Journey of Joenes (1962), Signet D2223 (1963), Corgi (1966), Dell 4268 (1969); as Journey of Joenes, Sphere (1978), Ace (1979)
- Mindswap, featured as complete short novel in Galaxy magazine June 1965, Delacorte (1966), Dell 5643 (1967), Mayflower-Dell (1968), Pan (1973), Ace (1978), Grafton (1986)
- The 10th Victim, Ballantine U5050 (1965), Mayflower-Dell 8604 (1966), Ace (1979), Signet (1987), Methuen (1987) – based on the short story "Seventh Victim"
- Dimension of Miracles, Dell (1968), Gollancz (1969), Mayflower (1971), Panther (1977), Ace (1979) Open Road Media (2014)
- Options, Pyramid (1975), Pan (1977), Grafton (1986)
- The Alchemical Marriage of Alistair Crompton, Michael Joseph (1978), Sphere (1979), also known as Crompton Divided, Holt, Rinehart and Winston (1978), Bantam (1979)
- Dramocles Holt, Rinehart and Winston (1983), New English Library (1984)
- Pop Death (1986)
- Victim Prime, Signet (1987)
- Hunter / Victim, Signet (1988)
- Bill, the Galactic Hero on the Planet of Bottled Brains (with Harry Harrison, 1990)
- Minotaur Maze (short novel, 1990)
- Xolotl (short, 1991)
- Alien Starswarm (short, 1991)
- Millennial Contest series (with Roger Zelazny):
  - Bring Me the Head of Prince Charming (1991)
  - If at Faust You Don't Succeed (1993)
  - A Farce to Be Reckoned With (1995)
- Star Trek: Deep Space Nine: The Laertian Gamble (1995)
- Aliens: Alien Harvest (1995)
- Godshome, Tor (1999)
- Babylon 5: A Call to Arms (1999)
- The Grand-Guignol of the Surrealists (2000)
- Dimension of Miracles Revisited (2000; self-published in English; published in France by Rivière Blanche, translated by Jean-Marc Lofficier)

==== Short story collections ====
- Untouched by Human Hands Ballantine H-73 (1954)
- Citizen in Space Ballantine H-126 (1955)
- Pilgrimage to Earth Bantam A1672 (1957)
- Notions: Unlimited Bantam A2003 (1960)
- Store of Infinity Bantam A2170 (1960)
- Shards of Space Bantam J2443 (1962)
- The People Trap and other Pitfalls, Snares, Devices and Delusions, as Well as Two Sniggles and a Contrivance Dell 6881 (1968)
- Can You Feel Anything When I Do This? Doubleday (1971), DAW 99 (1973), also known as The Same to You Doubled Pan (1974)
- The Robot Who Looked Like Me Sphere (1978), Bantam (1982)
- Uncanny Tales Five Star (2003)

==== Short story compilations ====
- The Wonderful World of Robert Sheckley Bantam (1979), Sphere (1980)
- The Sheckley Omnibus (1979)
- Is THAT What People Do? Holt, Rinehart and Winston (1984; 23 previously published stories and 16 new)
- The Collected Short Fiction of Robert Sheckley Pulphouse (1991; 5 volumes, vol. 5 includes new material)
- The Masque of Mañana NESFA (2005)
- Store of the Worlds NYRB (2012)

=== Mystery and espionage ===
- The Game of X Delacorte (1965) Dell 2788 (1966). It was loosely adapted as the 1981 Disney film, Condorman: Sheckley also wrote the novelization of this film.
- Stephen Dain series:
  - Calibre .50 Bantam A2216 (1961)
  - Dead Run Bantam A2240 (1961)
  - Live Gold Bantam J2401 (1962)
  - White Death Bantam J2685 (1963)
  - Time Limit Bantam F3381 (1967)
- Hob Draconian series:
  - The Alternative Detective Tor (1993)
  - Draconian New York Tor (1996)
  - Soma Blues Tor (1997)

=== Other works ===
- The Man in the Water Regency 112 (1962)

=== Books as editor ===
- After the Fall (1980)

=== Non-fiction ===
- "Futuropolis: Impossible Cities of Science Fiction and Fantasy" (1978, A&W Visual Library)
- "On Working Method" (1978, Vector 1978/9. Revised version published later as "How Pro Writers Really Write — Or Try To")
- "How Pro Writers Really Write — Or Try To" (1982, Is THAT What People Do?)
- "Immortality and Car Chases" (1992, Dark Side 1992/7)
- "Memories of the Fifties" (1992, New York Review of SF 1992/8)
- "Journal of Robert Sheckley" (1998, Galaxy eZine (Internet))
- "Philosophy & Science Fiction" (1999, Greenwich Village Gazette (Internet))
- "My Life in Oregon" (2000, Greenwich Village Gazette (Internet))
- "The World Out There: Muslim" (2001, BIGNews (also on Internet) 2001/12)
- "The World Out There: An Afghanistan Frame of Mind" (2002, BIGNews (also on Internet) 2001/1)
- "The World Out There: Rain, Melancholy, Travel" (2002, BIGNews (also on Internet) 2001/2)
- "On Lying" (2003, BIGNews (also on Internet) 2003/4)
- "The New Interactive Diary" (2003, BIGNews (also on Internet) 2003/10)
