= The Martian Chronicles (disambiguation) =

The Martian Chronicles is a 1950 science fiction short story fixup by Ray Bradbury.

The Martian Chronicles may also refer to:

- The Martian Chronicles (miniseries), a 1980 television miniseries based on the Bradbury book
- The Martian Chronicles (video game), a 1996 game based on the Bradbury book
- "The Martian Chronicles" (Supergirl), a 2017 episode of the TV series Supergirl

== See also ==
- Crónicas marcianas, a Spanish late-night talk show which ran from 1997 to 2005
- Cronache marziane, an Italian adaptation of the Spanish talk show which ran from 2004 to 2005
- Martian (disambiguation)
