= There Will Come Soft Rains =

There Will Come Soft Rains may refer to:

- "There Will Come Soft Rains" (poem), by Sara Teasdale
- "There Will Come Soft Rains" (short story), by Ray Bradbury
