= Allendale, California =

Allendale, California may refer to:

- Allendale, Oakland, California
- Allendale, Solano County, California
- Allendale, California, possibly one of the above, a community destroyed by nuclear war in Ray Bradbury's science fiction story "There Will Come Soft Rains", featured in his book The Martian Chronicles
