= I Sing the Body Electric! (short story collection) =

Book by Ray Bradbury

- cover of the first edition
- Author: Ray Bradbury
- Language: English
- Genre: Science fiction short stories
- Publisher: Knopf
- Publication date: 1969
- Publication place: United States
- Media type: Print (Hardcover)
- Pages: 305 pp.
- ISBN: 0-394-42985-0 (reprint)
- OCLC: 20058318

I Sing the Body Electric! is a 1969 collection of short stories by Ray Bradbury. The book takes its name from an included short story of the same title, which in turn took the title from a poem by Walt Whitman published in his collection Leaves of Grass.

== Contents ==
The collection includes these stories:

"The Kilimanjaro Device" (originally titled "The Kilimanjaro Machine", first appeared in Life Magazine, January 1965)
After a long drive, a man arrives in Idaho and begins to ask questions about a local who has died. In a bar, he finally finds someone who was familiar with the person he is looking for. Though the latter is never referred to by name, it becomes clear that he is none other than Ernest Hemingway. When asked why he's looking for him, the traveler reveals that his truck has the ability to travel in time. He goes further to explain that there are right graves and wrong graves; that people do not always die at the right time, and this local man is one of them. The traveler then departs to search for Hemingway, hoping to help him find a better end.
"The Terrible Conflagration Up at the Place"
A band of rebels plot to overthrow the local lordship and express their own freedom by burning down his stately home. Before they can get on with it, the lordship himself catches them in the act and invites them inside. Offering drinks, he resigns himself to let them burn his house, though bargains with them to do it the following night, so that he and his wife may still attend the theatre. The rebels ultimately agree that it is the only decent thing to do. However, before they leave the house, the lordship asks that they also spare the priceless works of art resting in the house. Before long, the complications of burning the house become too much, and the Lordship too friendly, leaving the rebel plans long forgotten.
"Tomorrow's Child"
Peter and Polly are excited about the birth of their first child, but the doctor has unfortunate news. Because of a series of malfunctions in the new birthing machines, their newborn child has been born into another dimension. While ultimately healthy, the baby's appearance is that of a small blue pyramid with tentacle-like appendages. Peter and Polly decide to take the baby home on the condition that the doctors continue ongoing work and research to try to bring their child back into his rightful dimension. Time passes, with both Peter and Polly dealing with the burden of raising their abnormal child; Polly takes it especially hard and begins drinking heavily. After almost exactly a year, the doctors give them a difficult choice. Their attempts to retrieve the baby have proved futile, but they can send Peter and Polly to the same dimension, where they would be reunited with their child, but their altered appearance would force them into solitude from the rest of society.
"The Women" (originally published in Famous Fantastic Mysteries, October 1948)
A man and his wife are at the beach, but something sinister has awakened in the water. Calling out for the man to step in the ocean, the water entity attempts to draw him to the depths. Increasingly aware of the danger, his wife does all she can to distract him from the call of the ocean. Time ticks by, the intelligence in the water growing desperate, knowing that if it cannot lure the man before he leaves today, it will be over. Storm clouds roll in, and wife believes she has won; her husband does not understand why she seems to be cheerful that their last day at the beach has been ruined. As they begin to walk away, the husband suddenly hears a drowning voice call out for help, and rushes into the water to save it. The entity envelops the man, and hours later releases his body to wash up on shore.
"The Inspired Chicken Motel"
The narrator recalls the time he spent traveling with his family during the Great Depression. In particular, he looks back fondly on a motel where the owner was the proud owner of a chicken with the ability to tell fortunes. When the family arrives, the owner presents them with two eggs, laid only days before their arrival. On one is the raised image of a longhorn steer, and the other contains the message "Rest in peace. Prosperity is near." Unsure what to make of the message, but ultimately given new hope, the family sets back out on the road.
"Downwind from Gettysburg" (originally published in Playboy Magazine, June 1969)
When a robotic recreation of Abraham Lincoln is shot dead in a movie theater, Bayes finds the dead Lincoln in a seat on the stage, and reminisces of the past when he and Phipps worked together to create him. Bayes confronts the killer, Mr. Booth, a self-pitying man who takes pleasure in doing harm. Bayes interrogates him, finding Mr. Booth killed Lincoln to gain attention and pleasure. Bayes then takes that away from the killer, ensuring that he will gain no attention for the murder. The killer fights back, but Bayes intimidates him, to the point where he threatens him with death should he ever talk about the murder. Mr. Booth flees from the theater, while Bayes reflects on himself over letting the killer go.
"Yes, We'll Gather at the River"
A small town is confronted with the reality of a new roadway being built. The new road bypasses the town completely, and threatens the livelihood of all the town's businesses. The store owners reflect on how things have changed; roads used to take years to build, but now take only a matter of hours. They each know that even though they will move onward, a part of them will die with the town; they ultimately accept this without ill feeling, seeing the inevitably changing course of the road like that of a flowing river.
"The Cold Wind and the Warm" (originally published in Harper's Magazine, July 1964)
In Dublin, Ireland, David and his team of strange travelers arrive at the Royal Hibernian Hotel, with the intention of "doing something mysterious". They meet a few of the townspeople, some of which find the visitors bizarre. The townspeople find the visitors suspicious, and they observe the travelers, finding them standing still in the park, watching the leaves change colors. They report their findings back at the tavern, only to have David walk into the tavern himself. He tells the story of two races travelling to the other's countries, to escape the heat or cold, and reveals that he himself was trying to escape the heat of the equatorial countries and visit a colder country like Ireland. The townspeople watch the leaves change colors as David and his team travel back to their countries.
"Night Call, Collect"
A man stranded on Mars sits in an empty town, in an empty house. A phone rings, and when he picks up he hears his own voice. He spent all his early years recording messages for his older self, years setting up the connections so that he might never feel alone. Now, years later, the calls all begin to come at once. At first they are comforting, but quickly they become a maddening reminder of all that he has lost. His youthful self sits out of the reach of time, mocking him as he grows only older. Maddened, he sets off across the planet, attempting to destroy every vestige of his own voice. On his way, he gets a call from a passing ship; is he finally rescued, or is it simply another trick played on him by his own voice?
"The Haunting of the New"
Nora, a rich owner of an illustrious house, invites Charlie to investigate her house after it seemingly causes her previous party to die down and end quickly. As Charlie drives to her house, he reminisces of the time he and Nora had spent together, and when he investigates the house, he finds a few good memories from his past. Nora then reveals that the real house had burnt down 4 years ago, but she had recreated it down to the finest details with the help of numerous artisans. She also wants Charlie to own the house, saying that she was too sinful and old for the house, claiming that her sins caused the original house to burn down in the first place. Charlie refuses, and he and Nora drive to her other home, while holding hands.
"I Sing the Body Electric!" (originally titled "The Beautiful One Is Here", first appeared in McCall's Magazine, August 1969; initially a screenplay by the author appearing on the TV series The Twilight Zone with an original air date of May 18, 1962)
Following the untimely death of their mother, a family decides to buy an electric grandmother in order to help around the house and serve as a nanny for the three children. Thrilled at the idea, Tom, Timothy and Agatha go with their father to the Fantoccini company showroom in order to custom-build their new grandmother. The children take turns selecting her parts, the color of her eyes, even the tone of her voice. Weeks later, a mysterious package arrives, a sarcophagus containing their factory-fresh electric grandmother. At the turn of a key, she springs to life and quickly becomes an essential part of the family. Tom, Timothy and their father immediately begin to love her, but Agatha remains distant, untrusting. It slowly becomes clear that Agatha does not believe that the grandmother will always be there for them; she is afraid that she will leave them, just as their mother did when she died. One day, Agatha runs from the house in tears straight into traffic. In a flash, the grandmother pushes her to safety, only to be hit by the car herself. Agatha cries, but finds herself comforted by the grandmother, who is unscathed by the accident. The grandmother insists that she will never leave her and that not even death could separate them. Agatha realizes that the grandmother is the only one who can keep that promise and finally opens up to her.
"The Tombling Day" (originally published in Shenandoah, Fall 1952)
In a small town in Missouri, an unused graveyard will be emptied to later be part of a new road. The locals agreed to remove the old bones. An old woman exhumes her fiancé of youth and brings his coffin home for a final requiem. She is astonished to discover that her beloved remains exactly as he was buried 60 years ago: a jolly 23-year-old man. The woman suddenly feels her old age oppressive, as she is unable to match her past beauty.
"Any Friend of Nicholas Nickleby's Is a Friend of Mine" (originally titled "Charlie Is My Darling", first appeared in McCall's Magazine, January 1966)
A man calling himself Charles Dickens arrives in a small, Midwest American town and moves into the boarding house run by the mother of the narrator, a young boy. He proceeds to "write" the novels of Dickens, sometimes dictating them to the boy and sometimes with a pen and paper. To the boy, the man is an inspiration; to the town's adults, he is a fraud.
"Heavy-Set" (originally published in Playboy Magazine, October 1964)
An aloof 30-year old man still lives with his mother. His mother worries and cares for his wellbeing, but there is something sinister about him, about exercising heavily each night, about dismissing most social activity invitations.
"The Man in the Rorschach Shirt" (originally published in Playboy Magazine, October 1966)
After retiring as a professional psychiatrist, a man decides to bring his expertise as an outdoor hobby. To this end, he wears shirts with Rorschach test themes while asking people around him what they see in his shirt.
"Henry the Ninth" (originally titled "A Final Sceptre, a Lasting Crown", first appeared in Fantasy & Science Fiction, October 1969)
Due to harsh and worsening weather, people from the northern hemisphere decide to migrate permanently to warmer climates. The whole of Great Britain will be evacuated shortly, save for a reluctant man who has decided to take care of the now-abandoned land.
"The Lost City of Mars" (originally published in Playboy Magazine, January 1967)
Tired of the usual luxuries, a rich businessman wants a new adventure: discover the fabled lost city of Mars, Dia-Sao, the City of Doom. He organizes an odd crew and floods the long-dry Martian watercourses, as Mars has never been explored by boat. Indeed, the crew finds the city hidden in a mountain, but what sinister secret in it drove away its original inhabitants in fear?
"Christus Apollo"
Cantata celebrating the eighth day of creation and the promise of the ninth.

== I Sing the Body Electric! and Other Stories ==
In 1998, Avon Books published I Sing the Body Electric! and Other Stories, which includes all the stories from the original collection as well as the following stories from Long After Midnight:

- "The Blue Bottle"
- "One Timeless Spring"
- "The Parrot Who Met Papa"
- "The Burning Man"
- "A Piece of Wood"
- "The Messiah"
- "G.B.S - Mark V"
- "The Utterly Perfect Murder"
- "Punishment Without Crime"
- "Getting Through Sunday Somehow"
- "Drink Entire: Against the Madness of Crowds"

== Reception ==
Joanna Russ noted that Bradbury "presents almost everything either in lyrical catalogue or dramatically, and while the lyrical catalogues sometimes fall flat, the dramatic dialogue hardly ever does. This gives his work tremendous immediate presence." She also said, "This is third-rate Bradbury, mostly. It is silly. It totally perverts the quotation from Whitman which it uses in its title. It is very good". The New York Times also received Body Electric favorably, saying "Whatever the premise, the author retains an enthusiasm for both the natural world and the supernatural that sends a tingle of excitement through even the flimsiest conceit."

== Adaptations ==
The title story, "I Sing the Body Electric!", was adapted from a 1962 Twilight Zone episode of the same name, which Bradbury had written. It was later adapted as a 1982 television movie, The Electric Grandmother, starring Maureen Stapleton.
