= The Electric Grandmother =

- Directed by: Noel Black
- Screenplay by: Ray Bradbury; Jeff Kindley
- Based on: "I Sing the Body Electric" by Ray Bradbury
- Starring: Maureen Stapleton; Edward Herrmann; Paul Benedict; Charlie Fields; Tara Kennedy; Robert MacNaughton; Madeleine Sherwood
- Cinematography: Mike Fash
- Edited by: Dennis M. O'Connor
- Music by: John Morris
- Production company: Highgate Pictures
- Release date: January 17, 1982 (USA)
- Running time: 60 minutes
- Country: United States
- Language: English

The Electric Grandmother is a television movie that originally aired January 17, 1982, on NBC as a 60-minute Project Peacock special, based on the 1969 science fiction short story "I Sing the Body Electric" by Ray Bradbury. It stars Maureen Stapleton and Edward Herrmann and was directed by Noel Black. Bradbury's story was originally written as a teleplay in 1962 as "I Sing the Body Electric", an episode of The Twilight Zone. The film was distributed on VHS by Coronet Video.

== Plot ==
Widower Henry purchases an android built in the form of a grandmother as a surrogate to his three children: Tom, Timothy, and Agatha. The two boys accept the gynoid grandmother but Agatha does not until she saves her life. When the children have grown up, and no longer need her, the grandmother returns to the factory where she was built and spends time with other electric grandmothers no longer needed. She is recalled to service to help the elderly Tom, Timothy and Agatha.

== Cast ==
- Maureen Stapleton as Grandmother
- Edward Herrmann as Henry
- Paul Benedict as Guido Fantoccini
- Tara Kennedy as Agatha
- Robert MacNaughton as Tom
- Charlie Fields as Timothy
- Madeleine Sherwood as Aunt Clara

== Awards ==
The Electric Grandmother received an Emmy Award nomination for Outstanding Children's Program, and won a Peabody Award. It has been recognized by Chicago International Children's Film Festival, International Film Festival for Children and Youth, American Film Festival and the Southern California Motion Picture Council. Additionally, 10-year-old actress Tara Kennedy was nominated for a Young Artist Award in the category Best Young Actress in a Movie Made for Television.

== Reviews ==
"Devotees of science fiction of any age, in school classes or public library programs, will find it a fascinating interpretation of Bradbury's fiction." — School Library Journal

== Popular culture and other versions ==
Washington DC musical duo The Electric Grandmother took their name from the film.

The 1987 telemovie Elektroninė senelė (Electronic Grandmother), also based on the Ray Bradbury story, aired on Central Television in Russia. Directed by Algimantas Puipa, it starred Lithuanian actress Ingeborga Dapkūnaitė in the lead role.
