= I Sing the Body Electric (The Twilight Zone) =

- The Twilight Zone episode
- Episode no.: Season 3 Episode 35
- Directed by: James Sheldon; William F. Claxton
- Written by: Ray Bradbury
- Production code: 4826
- Original air date: May 18, 1962

Guest appearances
- Josephine Hutchinson; David White; Vaughn Taylor; Doris Packer; Veronica Cartwright; Susan Crane; Charles Herbert; Dana Dillaway; Paul Nesbitt; Judee Morton

Episode chronology
| ← Previous "Young Man's Fancy" | Next → "Cavender Is Coming" |
- The Twilight Zone (1959 TV series) (season 3)

"I Sing the Body Electric" is episode 100 of the American television anthology series The Twilight Zone. The 1962 script was written by Ray Bradbury, and became the basis for his 1969 short story of the same name, itself named after an 1855 Walt Whitman poem. Although Bradbury contributed several scripts to The Twilight Zone, this was the only one produced.

== Opening narration ==
They make a fairly convincing pitch here. It doesn't seem possible, though, to find a woman who must be ten times better than mother in order to seem half as good, except, of course, in the Twilight Zone.

== Plot ==
Mr. Rogers, the widowed father of three children (Anne, Karen, and Tom), is dealing with the departure of Aunt Nedra, who says the children are too hard to manage. The father takes his children to a factory, Facsimile Ltd., to select a new robotic grandmother. When she arrives, young Tom and Karen are quickly smitten by the magical "grandmother". But older daughter Anne will not accept her; "Grandma" reminds her too much of her own mother, who died and left her a bitter young girl. Anne tries to run away. She runs into the path of an oncoming van which she does not see. Grandma pushes Anne out of the way and is struck, saving the girl. Grandma is stunned, but the sturdily constructed robot soon gets up, and Anne grows to love her when she realizes that Grandma is indestructible and will not leave them like their own mother had. Mr. Rogers also realizes how empathetic Grandma can be when she correctly deduces that he lost his own mother at a young age and, like Anne, never forgave her.

As of this moment, the wonderful electric grandmother moved into the lives of children and father. She became integral and important. She became the essence. As of this moment, they would never see lightning, never hear poetry read, never listen to foreign tongues without thinking of her. Everything they would ever see, hear, taste, feel would remind them of her. She was all life, and all life was wondrous, quick, electrical – like Grandma.

The children grow up and are ready for college. Now, it is time for Grandma to move on to another family as she is apparently not needed anymore. Grandma expresses her sadness about leaving, yet reassures the children that they brought her just as much joy as she brought them. She will return to the factory where she will either be sent to another family, or possibly have her mind stored where she and the other grandmothers like her can talk and share their experiences. After repeating this process many times, if she keeps being a good grandmother to other children, she ultimately will be rewarded with the gift of life and humanity. The children say their farewells, and Grandma leaves the house for good.

== Closing narration ==
A fable? Most assuredly. But who's to say at some distant moment there might be an assembly line producing a gentle product in the form of a grandmother whose stock in trade is love? Fable, sure, but who's to say?

== Cast ==
- Josephine Hutchinson as Grandma
- David White as Mr Rogers
- Vaughn Taylor as Salesman
- Doris Packer as Nedra
- Veronica Cartwright as Anne (age 13)
- Susan Crane as Anne (age 21)
- Charles Herbert as Tom (age 12)
- Paul Nesbitt as Tom (age 20)
- Dana Dillaway as Karen (age 10)
- Judee Morton as Karen (age 18)

== Narration ==
In addition to opening and closing the show as usual, Rod Serling's narration occurs in the middle of the story, to describe how the children spent years happily with their Gynoid grandmother and eventually grow up. Other episodes to feature mid-show narration from Serling are all from the first half of season one: "Walking Distance", "Time Enough At Last" and "I Shot an Arrow into the Air".

This is one of the few episodes of the series where Rod Serling does not mention the name of the show in the closing narration.

== Other adaptations ==
In 1982, the hour-long NBC television movie The Electric Grandmother was also based on the short story.

It was also adapted for radio in 2011 in The Twilight Zone Radio Dramas by Falcon Picture Group and starred Dee Wallace.

== Bibliography ==
- DeVoe, Bill. (2008). Trivia from The Twilight Zone. Albany, GA: Bear Manor Media. ISBN 978-1-59393-136-0
- Grams, Martin. (2008). The Twilight Zone: Unlocking the Door to a Television Classic. Churchville, MD: OTR Publishing. ISBN 978-0-9703310-9-0
