= The Machineries of Joy =

1964 collection of short stories by Ray Bradbury

- Dust-jacket from the first edition
- Author: Ray Bradbury
- Language: English
- Genre: Science fiction
- Publisher: Simon & Schuster
- Publication date: February 17, 1964
- Publication place: United States
- Media type: Print (hardback)
- Pages: 255

The Machineries of Joy (1964) is a collection of short stories by American writer Ray Bradbury.

== Contents ==
- "The Machineries of Joy"
- "The One Who Waits"
- "Tyrannosaurus Rex"
- "The Vacation"
- "The Drummer Boy of Shiloh"
- "Boys! Raise Giant Mushrooms in Your Cellar"
- "Almost the End of the World"
- "Perhaps We Are Going Away"
- "And the Sailor, Home from the Sea"
- "El Día de Muertos"
- "The Illustrated Woman"
- "Some Live Like Lazarus"
- "A Miracle of Rare Device"
- "And So Died Riabouchinska"
- "The Beggar on O'Connell Bridge"
- "Death and the Maiden"
- "A Flight of Ravens"
- "The Best of All Possible Worlds"
- "The Lifework of Juan Díaz"
- "To the Chicago Abyss"
- "The Anthem Sprinters"

== Sources ==
- Tuck, Donald H. (1974). The Encyclopedia of Science Fiction and Fantasy. Chicago: Advent. p. 62. ISBN 0-911682-20-1.
