= There Will Come Soft Rains (short story) =

1950 short story by Ray Bradbury

- Short story by Ray Bradbury
- Country: United States
- Language: English
- Genres: Science fiction, post-apocalyptic fiction

Publication
- Published in: Collier's Weekly
- Publication type: Periodical
- Media type: Print magazine
- Publication date: May 6, 1950 (issue date)

Chronology
April 2057: The Long Years	October 2057: The Million-Year Picnic

"There Will Come Soft Rains" is a science fiction short story by author Ray Bradbury written as a chronicle about a lone house that stands intact in a California city that has otherwise been obliterated by a nuclear bomb. The title is from a 1918 poem of the same name by Sara Teasdale that was published during World War I and the Spanish flu pandemic. The story was first published in 1950 in two different versions in two separate publications, a one-page short story in Collier's magazine and a chapter of the fix-up novel The Martian Chronicles.

The author regarded it as "the one story that represents the essence of Ray Bradbury". Bradbury's foresight in recognizing the potential for the complete self-destruction of humans by nuclear war in the work was recognized by the Pulitzer Prize Board in conjunction with awarding a Special Citation in 2007 that noted, "While time has (mostly) quelled the likelihood of total annihilation, Bradbury was a lone voice among his contemporaries in contemplating the potentialities of such horrors." The author considered the short story as the only one in The Martian Chronicles to be a work of science fiction.

== Plot summary ==
A nuclear catastrophe has left the city of Allendale, California entirely desolate. However, within one miraculously preserved house, the daily routine continues: automatic systems within the home prepare breakfast, clean the house, make beds, wash dishes, and address the former residents without any knowledge of their current state as burnt silhouettes on one of the walls.

The automated house system chimes the date by saying, "Today is August 4, 2026".

A sickly and emaciated dog, having previously belonged to the family, enters the house. It is unable to enter the kitchen, where the automated systems are making pancakes. It runs around in a frenzy, before dying. After an hour, the automated systems remove the dog's body, incinerating it.

That evening, the house recites to the absent hostess a random selection by her favorite poet, "There Will Come Soft Rains" by Sara Teasdale. A windstorm blows a tree branch through a window in the kitchen, starting a fire. The house's systems desperately attempt to put out the fire, but the doomed home burns to the ground in a night. The following dawn, all that remains is a single wall, which contains an automated system that endlessly reads aloud the date by repeatedly saying, "Today is August 5, 2026".

== Publication history ==
The short story first appeared in the May 6, 1950 issue of Collier's magazine, set as April 28, 1985, and was revised and included as a chapter titled "August 2026: There Will Come Soft Rains" in Bradbury's The Martian Chronicles that was also first published in May 1950. The official publication dates for the two versions were only two days apart. The 1997 edition of The Martian Chronicles advanced all dates in the 1950 edition by 31 years, changing the title to "August 2057: There Will Come Soft Rains".

It was published as stand alone in 1984 in an anthology of short stories published in English Top Science Fiction and in Spanish La crema de la ciencia ficción with an introduction by Ray Bradbury himself, writing that he wrote this short history after he saw a picture of a Hiroshima wall with the preserved shadows of people the bomb had killed.

== Adaptations ==
- An adaptation was broadcast on June 17, 1950, as the 11th episode of Dimension X, a science-fiction radio program.
- In 1953, an adaptation of the story was published in issue 17 of the comic book Weird Fantasy, with art by Wally Wood.
- The story was made into a radio play for the X Minus One series and broadcast on December 5, 1956.
- In 1962, actor Burgess Meredith recorded this story, which was released on LP by Prestige Lively Arts (30004), along with "Marionettes, Inc.", also by Bradbury.
- in 1962, the BBC Third Programme broadcast a dramatization by Nasta Pain, with original music by John Carol Case.
- In 1975, actor Leonard Nimoy's narrations of this story and Ray Bradbury's Usher II, also from The Martian Chronicles, were released on Caedmon Records.
- In 1977, August the Fourth, 2026: There Will Come Soft Rains was broadcast on BBC Radio 4. It used the resources of the BBC Radiophonic Workshop under the direction of Malcolm Clarke.
- In 1984, the Soviet studio Uzbekfilm produced "There Will Come Soft Rains" as a short animated film. (ru)
- In 1984, an anthology of short science stories with introductions by its authors Top Science Fiction (English edition) and La crema de la ciencia ficción (Spanish) published it as stand alone, and the author's introduction tells what inspired Bradbury.
- In 1992, Lebbeus Woods adapted the story to the third issue of the comic book series Ray Bradbury Chronicles.
- In 2008, the post-apocalyptic game Fallout 3, which takes place in the irradiated remnants of Washington, D.C., featured a robot in a house in Georgetown which, upon entering a command in a terminal in the house, would hover in the bedroom of the occupant's children and recite the poem for which this story is named.
- In 2015, shortly after Leonard Nimoy's death, the concept album Soft Rains was released featuring Nimoy's 1975 reading, set to music by producer Carwyn Ellis under the pseudonym Zarelli.

== See also ==
- List of stories set in a future now in the past
- "The Long Years", another story collected in The Martian Chronicles also originally set in 2026
