= The Martian Chronicles (video game) =

1995 video game

- Developer: Byron Preiss Multimedia Company
- Publisher: Simon & Schuster
- Platforms: Windows, Macintosh
- Release: NA: 1995
- Genre: Adventure

The Martian Chronicles is a 1995 video game developed by Byron Preiss Multimedia Company, released for Windows and Mac OS.

== Gameplay ==
The Martian Chronicles is an adventure game based on the works of Ray Bradbury.

== Reception ==
In 1996, Computer Gaming World declared The Martian Chronicles the 16th-worst computer game ever released. It received a largely negative review from Computer Game Review, whose writers called it "dull and lifeless".
