= There Will Come Soft Rains (poem) =

1918 poem by Sara Teasdale

- by Sara Teasdale
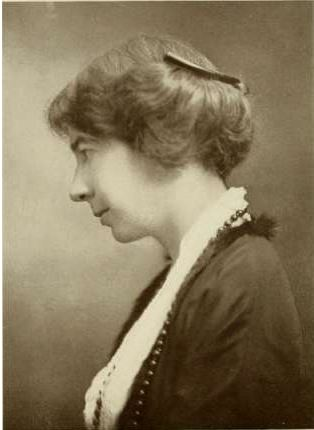
- Portrait of Sara Teasdale, 1914
- Genre: Lyric poetry
- Meter: Irregular tetrameter
- Rhyme scheme: Couplet
- Publisher: Harper's Magazine
- Publication date: July 1918
- Media type: Print magazine
- Lines: 12

"There Will Come Soft Rains" is a lyric poem by Sara Teasdale published just after the start of the 1918 German Spring Offensive during World War I, and during the 1918 flu pandemic about nature's establishment of a new peaceful order that will be indifferent to the outcome of the war or mankind's extinction. The work was first published in the July 1918 issue of Harper's Monthly Magazine, and later revised and provided with the subtitle "War Time" in her 1920 collection Flame and Shadow (see 1920 in poetry). The "War Time" subtitle refers to several of her poems that contain "War Time" in their titles published during World War I, in particular to "Spring In War Time" that was published in her 1915 anthology Rivers to the Sea (see 1915 in poetry). The two poems, to the exclusion of all other of Teasdale works, appeared together in two World War I poetry anthologies, A Treasury of War Poetry: British and American Poems of the World War, 1914–1917 published in 1917, and Poems of the War and the Peace published in 1921.

== Text ==
The original publication of "There Will Come Soft Rains" in Harper's Monthly Magazine does not contain the subtitle "War Time" that appears in the Flame and Shadow anthology, and "circling" in the second line was "calling" in the magazine. Quotation marks are included in the title, which is a stylistic convention used by the author that indicates the title is a phrase appearing in the first line of the poem.

"There Will Come Soft Rains"
(War Time)

There will come soft rains and the smell of the ground,
And swallows circling with their shimmering sound;

And frogs in the pools singing at night,
And wild plum-trees in tremulous white;

Robins will wear their feathery fire
Whistling their whims on a low fence-wire;

And not one will know of the war, not one
Will care at last when it is done.

Not one would mind, neither bird nor tree
If mankind perished utterly;

And Spring herself, when she woke at dawn,
Would scarcely know that we were gone.

The poem includes six stanzas, each made up of a rhyming couplet in irregular tetrameters.

== Themes ==
=== Anti-war message ===
In Flame and Shadow, "There Will Come Soft Rains" is the first of the six poems in section VIII that dwell on loss caused by war—all of which reflect pacifist sentiments. The subtitle "(War Time)" of the poem, which appears in the Flame and Shadow version of the text, is a reference to Teasdale's poem "Spring In War Time" that was published in Rivers to the Sea about three years earlier. "There Will Come Soft Rains" addresses four questions related to mankind's suffering caused by the devastation of World War I that appear in "Spring in War Time". The questions together ask how Nature can permit the Spring season to start while the war continues.

Spring in War Time

I feel the Spring far off, far off,
The faint far scent of bud and leaf—
Oh how can Spring take heart to come
To a world in grief,
Deep grief?

The sun turns north, the days grow long,
Later the evening star grows bright—
How can the daylight linger on
For men to fight,
Still fight?

The grass is waking in the ground,
Soon it will rise and blow in waves—
How can it have the heart to sway
Over the graves,
New graves?

Under the boughs where lovers walked
The apple-blooms will shed their breath—
But what of all the lovers now
Parted by death,
Gray Death?

"There Will Come Soft Rains" expresses an anti-war message in that Nature, as personified by Spring, ignores the four questions asked by the poet in "Spring In War Time" by awakening even as war may destroy any meaning for mankind's existence because such meaning, if it exists at all, only resides within mankind itself. In the poem, Nature proceeds indifferently to the outcome of war or human extinction as the personified Spring would "not mind" because Spring "would scarcely know that we were gone".

=== The "War Time" subtitle and battlefield imagery ===
The Sedition Act of 1918 enacted two months before the original publication of "There Will Come Soft Rains" made it a criminal offense to "willfully utter, print, write, or publish any disloyal, profane, scurrilous, or abusive language about the form of the Government of the United States" and forced Teasdale to express her opposition to World War I "obliquely" in what might appear to be a pastoral poem. Flame and Shadow fell under the same regime of censorship since the Sedition Act was not repealed until December 13, 1920, but Teasdale revised her work to improve the chance that readers would perceive the implied battlefield imagery that, if made explicit, could have exposed her to criminal prosecution.

== Influences ==
Teasdale's point of view in "There Will Come Soft Rains" that the universe has no caring interest in the existence or any actions of human beings developed from her readings of the works of Charles Darwin, which began in earnest in 1913. The same principle applies to all of the other living things mentioned in the poem. Thus, given that swallows, frogs, and robins must kill other creatures to feed themselves, the serenity in the poetic settings for them symbolizes the absence in their natures of war that is in human nature and not an idyllic world without violence.

== Adaptations ==
Choral settings that incorporate all or parts of Teasdale's poem as lyrics have been published by several composers and performed by numerous organizations. These include:

- Tom Vignieri, SSSAA with string orchestra, (publisher unknown 2010)
- Ivo Antognini, SSAATTBB a cappella, Alliance Music (2012)
- Eriks Esenvalds, SSAATTBB a cappella, Music Baltica (2016)
- Christopher Tin, SSAATTBB with string orchestra, piano, and others, Decca Classics (2022)

A 1950 short story by Ray Bradbury shares the title and themes of the poem, and quotes it.

== See also ==
- The World Without Us
- Life After People
- Aftermath: Population Zero
- Zone Rouge: Former World War I battlefields reclaimed by nature
