= Long After Midnight =

1976 short story collection by Ray Bradbury

- dust-jacket from the first edition
- Author: Ray Bradbury
- Cover artist: Henry Fuseli; The Nightmare - 1781
- Language: English
- Genre: Science fiction
- Publisher: Knopf
- Publication date: 1976
- Publication place: United States
- Media type: Print (hardback)
- Pages: vii, 271 pp
- ISBN: 0-394-47942-4
- OCLC: 2452448
- Dewey Decimal: 813/.5/4
- LC Class: PZ3.B72453 Lo PS3503.R167

Long After Midnight is a short story collection by American writer Ray Bradbury. Several of the stories are original to this collection. Others originally appeared in the magazines Planet Stories, Collier's Weekly, Playboy, Esquire, Welcome Aboard, Other Worlds, Cavalier, Gallery, McCall's, Woman's Day, Harper's, Charm, Weird Tales, Eros, and Penthouse.

== Contents ==
1. "The Blue Bottle"
2. "One Timeless Spring"
3. "The Parrot Who Met Papa"
4. "The Burning Man"
5. "A Piece of Wood"
6. "The Messiah"
7. "G.B.S.-Mark V"
8. "The Utterly Perfect Murder"
9. "Punishment Without Crime"
10. "Getting Through Sunday Somehow"
11. "Drink Entire: Against the Madness of Crowds"
12. "Interval in Sunlight"
13. "A Story of Love"
14. "The Wish"
15. "Forever and the Earth"
16. "The Better Part of Wisdom"
17. "Darling Adolf"
18. "The Miracles of Jamie"
19. "The October Game"
20. "The Pumpernickel"
21. "Long After Midnight"
22. "Have I Got a Chocolate Bar for You!"

== Reception ==
=== Reviews ===
Writing in The New York Times, Gerald Jonas gave the collection a scathing review, saying that the stories "reveal Bradbury at his worst -- dressing up the sentimental cliches of mass magazine fiction in various s.f. or fantasy disguises." Jonas noted that Long After Midnight contained little recent work, but was mostly decades-old fiction passed over when compiling prior collections. Associated Press books editor Phil Thomas, however, praised the collection as "filled with the sense of wonder that marks so much of Bradbury's work."

=== Awards ===
It was nominated for the 1977 World Fantasy Awards category of "Best Collection/Anthology".

== Adaptations ==
=== Television miniseries ===
In 1979 NBC partnered with the BBC to commission The Martian Chronicles, a three-episode miniseries adaptation running just over four hours. It was written by Richard Matheson and was directed by Michael Anderson. The story "The Messiah" was incorporated into the mini-series and rewritten to be part of "The Martian" segment.

=== Television adaptations of individual stories ===
The cable television series The Ray Bradbury Theater adapted two individual short stories from Long After Midnight, "The Utterly Perfectly Murder" and "Punishment Without Crime". The 1985 The Twilight Zone revival adapted one short story from Long After Midnight, "The Burning Man".

== Sources ==
- "Library of Congress Online Catalog".
- Contento, William G. "Index to Science Fiction Anthologies and Collections, Combined Edition". Archived from the original on January 6, 2007.
