= Yunfeng Financial =

Chinese financial services company

Yunfeng Financial Group Limited
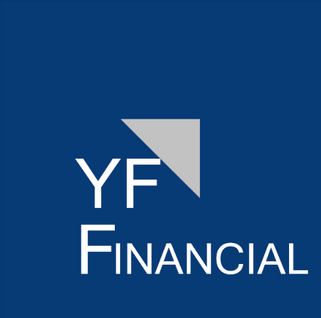
- Native name: 云锋金融集团
- Type: Public
- Traded as: SEHK: 376
- Industry: Financial services
- Founded: 4 August 1982; 44 years ago
- Headquarters: Hong Kong
- Key people: David Feng Yu (Chairman)
- Net income: ▲HK$777.57 million (2024)
- Total assets: ▲HK$96.04 billion (2024)
- Total equity: ▼HK$15.69 billion (2024)
- Owner: Yunfeng Capital
- Number of employees: 545 (2024)
- Website: www.yff.com

Yunfeng Financial Group Limited (YFF) is a publicly listed Chinese financial services company. It is backed by Alibaba Group founder Jack Ma and is considered to be his venture into the financial sector.

== Background ==
The origins of YFF can be traced to a securities brokerage firm in Hong Kong established by HSBC, Hang Seng Bank and Far East Bank. It underwent name changes several times although it was most prominently known as Mansion House Securities.

On 17 July 1987, the brokerage was listed on the main board of the Hong Kong Stock Exchange.

During the 1980s and 1990s, Mansion House Securities was among the top 50 largest local brokerages in Hong Kong.

The brokerage was hit hard during the 1997 Asian financial crisis and its holding company was sold to Asia Telemedia in 2001. However Asia Telemedia also got into financial trouble and went bankrupt in 2008. After restructuring, the listed holding company was renamed Reorient Group. Despite the financial difficulties of the holding companies, the brokerage itself was still able to operate without issue and still served around 4,000 active clients.

In 2015, Yunfeng Capital through several investment vehicles acquired a majority stake in Reorient Group for HK$2.7 billion. Although Alibaba Group did not hold any direct equity, the acquisition was considered to be Jack Ma's venture into the financial sector. In November 2016, Reorient Group was renamed to Yunfeng Financial Group.

In August 2017, YFF agreed to acquire the Asia unit of MassMutual for US$1.7 billion which was completed in November 2018. In March 2019, the unit was rebranded to YF Life.

In September 2025, YFF acquired 10,000 units of Ethereum for US$44 million. The company stated it was strategic reserves used to provide key infrastructure support for tokenised real-world asset projects. YFF also entered a partnership with Ant Group.
