= Ben Hardy (actor) =

English actor (b. 1991)

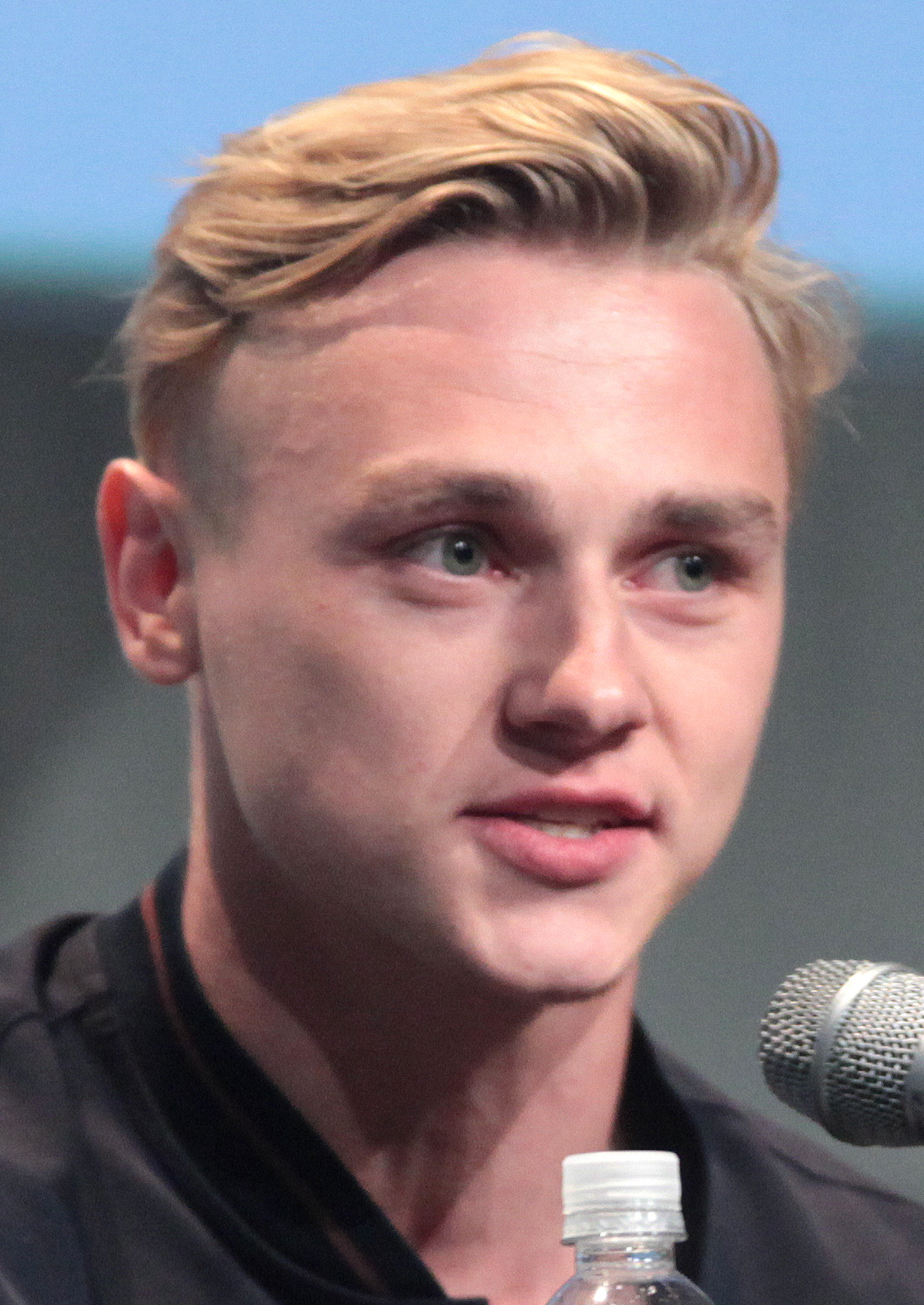
- Hardy in 2015
- Born: Ben Jones; 2 January 1991 (age 35); Bournemouth, Dorset, England
- Education: Royal Central School of Speech and Drama
- Occupation: Actor
- Years active: 2012–present

Ben Hardy (born Ben Jones; 2 January 1991) is an English actor. A graduate of the Royal Central School of Speech and Drama, he began his professional career on stage before moving into television and film.

He made his film debut as Archangel in X-Men: Apocalypse (2016) and portrayed Queen drummer Roger Taylor in the biographical film Bohemian Rhapsody (2018) for which the cast received an Screen Actors Guild Award nomination. His other film roles include Only the Brave (2017), 6 Underground (2019), The Voyeurs (2021), Love At First Sight (2023) and The Conjuring: Last Rites. (2025)

On television, Hardy has appeared in the miniseries The Woman in White (2018) and The Girl Before (2021). Earlier in his career, he played Peter Beale in the BBC soap opera EastEnders (2013–2015).

== Early life ==
Hardy was born 2 January 1991 in Bournemouth, Dorset, and grew up in Sherborne. He attended Sherborne Abbey Primary School and the Gryphon School. As a student at Gryphon, Hardy starred as Sergeant Francis Troy in a school film adaptation of Far from the Madding Crowd.

== Career ==
=== Early Career ===
In 2012, Hardy starred as Arthur Wellesley in the David Hare play The Judas Kiss, also featuring Rupert Everett. The production initially had a limited run at the Hampstead Theatre from September to October 2012 followed by a short tour to Bath, Richmond, Brighton and Cambridge before, after rave reviews, transferring to the West End's Duke of York's Theatre in January 2013.

On 19 April 2013, it was announced that Hardy would play Peter Beale in the long-running BBC soap opera EastEnders. He made his first appearance on 7 June 2013. On 19 November 2014, it was announced that Hardy would leave the series. He made his final appearance on 24 February 2015.

=== Film and Television (2016–present) ===
Hardy made his film debut in Bryan Singer's superhero film X-Men: Apocalypse, released on 27 May 2016, co-starring as the winged mutant Archangel. He subsequently portrayed John William Polidori in Haifaa Al-Mansour's period romance film Mary Shelley and Granite Mountain Hotshots firefighter Wade Parker, who lost his life in the 2013 Yarnell Hill Fire, in Joseph Kosinski's action-drama Only the Brave. Both films were released in 2017.

In 2018, he played the lead role of Walter Hartright in the BBC adaptation of the Wilkie Collins novel The Woman in White. That year, he also portrayed Queen drummer Roger Taylor in the biographical film Bohemian Rhapsody. Hardy and the film's ensemble were nominated for Outstanding Performance by a Cast in a Motion Picture at the 25th Screen Actors Guild Awards.

Hardy next appeared in the Netflix action thriller film 6 Underground, directed by Michael Bay. The film was released on 13 December 2019. In 2020, he played Frank in the movie Pixie, alongside Olivia Cooke and Daryl McCormack, among others and directed by Barnaby Thompson.

In 2021, he starred opposite Sydney Sweeney in the Amazon Prime Video Thriller The Voyeurs and appeared in the HBO Max and BBC psychological thriller miniseries The Girl Before.

In 2023, he starred in the romantic comedy Love at First Sight, an adaptation of Jennifer E Smith's novel The Statistical Probability of Love at First Sight. The film topped Netflix's global English language film chart during each of its first two weeks of release.

That year, Hardy starred in the drama Unicorns, directed by Sally El Hosaini and James Krishna Floyd. Hardy portrayed Luke, a single father who begins a relationship with a British Indian drag performer. The film premiered at the Toronto International Film Festival. Hardy and co-star Jason Patel were nominated for Best Joint Lead Performance at the British Independent Film Awards.

In 2025, Hardy portrayed Tony Spera in Michael Chaves' supernatural horror film The Conjuring: Last Rites, the ninth installment in The Conjuring Universe.

== Filmography ==
Key
†	Denotes works that have not yet been released

=== Film ===
Year	Title	Role	Notes
2016	X-Men: Apocalypse	Warren Worthington III / Archangel	
2017	Mary Shelley	John William Polidori	
2017	Only the Brave	Wade Parker	
2018	Bohemian Rhapsody	Roger Taylor	
2019	6 Underground	"Four"	
2020	Pixie	Frank	
2021	The Voyeurs	Seb	
2023	Unicorns	Luke	
2023	Love at First Sight	Oliver	
2025	The Conjuring: Last Rites	Tony Spera	
TBA	Eleven Missing Days †		Filming

=== Television ===
Year	Title	Role	Notes
2012	Call the Midwife	Reporter	Uncredited; 1 episode
2013–2015	EastEnders	Peter Beale	Series regular; 192 episodes
2017	Drunk History	King Arthur	Episode: "King Arthur/Eric Liddell"
2018	The Woman in White	Walter Hartright	Miniseries; main role
2021	The Girl Before	Simon Wakefield	Miniseries; main role
2027	The Cadburys	Francis Fry	

=== Stage ===
Year	Title	Role	Notes
2012	The Judas Kiss	Arthur Wellesley	Hampstead Theatre and Duke of York's Theatre

== Awards and nominations ==
Year	Award	Category	Nominee/work	Result	Ref.
2013	Inside Soap Award	Best Newcomer	EastEnders	Shortlisted	
2014	TV Choice Award	Best Soap Actor	EastEnders	Longlisted	
2017	Kids' Choice Award	#Squad	X-Men: Apocalypse	Nominated	
2019	Screen Actors Guild Award	Outstanding Performance by a Cast in a Motion Picture	Bohemian Rhapsody	Nominated	
2024	British Independent Film Awards	Best Joint Lead Performance	Unicorns	Nominated	
