= Jack in the Box (disambiguation) =

A jack-in-the-box is a children's toy dating back to the 16th century.

Jack in the Box is an American restaurant chain.

Jack in the Box or Jack-in-the-Box may also refer to:

== Music ==
- Jack in the Box (Satie), a work for a pantomime-ballet
- Jack in the Box (album), 2022 studio album by South Korean rapper J-Hope
- "Jack in the Box" (song), a 1971 song by Clodagh Rodgers
- "Jack in the Box", a 1977 song by The Moments

== Literature ==
- Jack-in-the-Box (novel), 1944 detective novel by J.J. Connington
- "Jack-in-the-Box" (short story), a 1947 short story by Ray Bradbury
- Jack-in-the-Box (Marvel Comics) (real name Jack Mead), a mutant superhero in Marvel Comics publications
- Jack-in-the-Box, a character in Astro City

== Other uses ==
- The Jack in the Box, a 2019 British horror film
- Jack-in-the-box effect, an armored vehicle's turret becoming displaced after a sympathetic detonation

== See also ==
- Jack Box, the mascot for the Jack in the Box restaurant
- Jackinabox, a 2005 album by Turin Brakes
