= The Woman in the Wall =

British television series

- Genre: Psychological thriller; Crime drama
- Created by: Joe Murtagh
- Directed by: Harry Wootliff; Rachna Suri
- Starring: Ruth Wilson; Daryl McCormack
- Country of origin: United Kingdom
- Original language: English
- No. of series: 1
- No. of episodes: 6

Production
- Executive producers: Ruth Wilson; Joe Murtagh; Sam Lavender; Simon Maxwell; Harry Wootliff
- Running time: 57 minutes
- Production company: Motive Pictures

Original release
- Network: BBC One
- Release: 27 August – 24 September 2023

The Woman in the Wall is a six-part mystery drama television series created by Joe Murtagh and starring Ruth Wilson and Daryl McCormack. It premiered on 27 August 2023 on BBC One.

== Synopsis ==
Lorna (Wilson) wakes up to find the apparently dead body of a woman in her house. Lorna has a long history of trauma-based sleepwalking that stretches back to her time spent in Ireland’s controversial Magdalene laundries.

== Cast ==
- Ruth Wilson as Lorna Brady
  - Abby Fitz as Young Lorna
- Daryl McCormack as Detective Colman Akande
  - Nicolas Nunes de Souza as Young Colman
- Simon Delaney as Sergeant Aidan Massey
- Philippa Dunne as Niamh
- Mark Huberman as Michael Kearney
- Hilda Fay as Amy Kane
- Frances Tomelty as Sister Eileen
  - Aoibhinn McGinnity as Young Sister Eileen
- Dermot Crowley as James Coyle
- Caoimhe Farren as Clemence Tooley
  - Ciara Stell as Young Clemence
- Cillian Lenaghan as Conor Skelly
- Stephen Brennan as Father Percy Sheehan
  - Michael O'Kelly as Young Father Percy
- Liam Heslin as Luke Drennan
- Lynn Rafferty as Anna
- Chizzy Akudolu as Lola Akande
- Eimear Morrissey as Superintendent Louise Byrne
- Charles Abomeli as Tayo Akande
- Helen Roche as Peggy
- Anne Kent as Deirdre
- Fiona Bell as Aoife
  - Orla Gaffney as Young Aoife Cassidy
- Ardal O'Hanlon as Dara
- Aisling O'Neill as Mrs. Moran

== Episodes ==
No.	Title	Directed by	Written by	Original release date	U.K. viewers (millions)
1	"Back to Life"	Harry Wootliff	Joe Murtagh	27 August 2023	4.70
2	"Show Thyself"	Harry Wootliff	Joe Murtagh	28 August 2023	3.33
3	"Knock, Knock"	Rachna Suri	Joe Murtagh & Margaret Perry	3 September 2023	3.44
4	"The Cruelty Man"	Rachna Suri	Joe Murtagh	10 September 2023	3.53
5	"Ex Gratia"	Harry Wootliff	Joe Murtagh	17 September 2023	3.58
6	"A Little Resurrection"	Harry Wootliff	Joe Murtagh	24 September 2023	4.04

== Production ==
The project was announced in August 2022 as a joint BBC and Showtime project with Joe Murtagh as writer and creator alongside Harry Wootliff and Rachna Suri directing, with Ruth Wilson and Daryl McCormack in the lead roles and Wilson also as an executive producer. Also acting as executive producers were Sam Lavender, Simon Maxwell, Joe Murtagh, and Harry Wootliff. The series is produced by Motive Pictures.

Filming took place on location in Portaferry, County Down, in Northern Ireland and also the Republic of Ireland, namely County Mayo.

Producers are Simon Maxwell, Sam Lavender, Joe Murtagh, Ruth Wilson, and Harry Wootliff, with Lucy Richer for BBC.

Ruth Wilson told Boyd Hilton when interviewed on the Pilot TV podcast that one of her inspirations for the voice of her character was Cora Staunton, a ladies' Gaelic footballer.

== Release ==
Several months after its original premiere on BBC One the series aired on Showtime in the United States starting on 21 January 2024.

== Reception ==
The review aggregator website Rotten Tomatoes reported a 70% approval rating with an average rating of 7.40/10, based on 10 critic reviews.

=== Accolades ===
In March 2024, the series was nominated for Best Drama and Best script at the IFTA Film & Drama Awards with Darryl McCormack nominated for Best Actor, Simon Delaney for Best Supporting Actor and Hilda Fay for Best Supporting Actress. The series was nominated for Best Drama Series and Wilson for Best Actress at the 2024 Broadcasting Press Guild Awards.
