= Popup =

Popup, Pop up or pop-up may refer to:

== Arts, entertainment, and media ==
- Pop Up (album), a 2007 album by Yelle
- Pop Up (video game), a video game also known as Bumpy
- Pop-up book, a book with three-dimensional pages
- Pop-Up, an episode of the Canadian television comedy series The Office Movers

== Computing ==
- Pop-up (video gaming), or pop up graphics, a phenomenon associated with limited draw distance in 3D video games
- Pop-up ad, a form of web advertising that appears in a new window
- Context menu or pop-up menu, an element of computer interaction
- Modal window or pop-up dialog boxes, a child window that blocks user interaction to the parent window

== Sports ==
- Pop-up, a kind of batted ball in baseball
- Pop-up, an easily attackable ball in the sport of pickleball
- Boilie, a buoyant fishing bait also known as pop-ups

== Temporary events ==
- Pop-up exhibition, a temporary art exhibition
- Pop-up hotel, a temporary lodging establishment
- Pop-up restaurant, a temporary restaurant
- Pop-up retail, short-term sales space

== Other uses ==
- Pop-up, a type of air tactic employed in standoff situations
- Pop-up Globe, a theatre in new Zealand
- Pop-up headlamps or hidden headlights
- Popup camper, a type of recreational vehicle

== See also ==
- Jack in the Box (disambiguation)
