= Daryl McCormack =

Irish actor (born 1993)

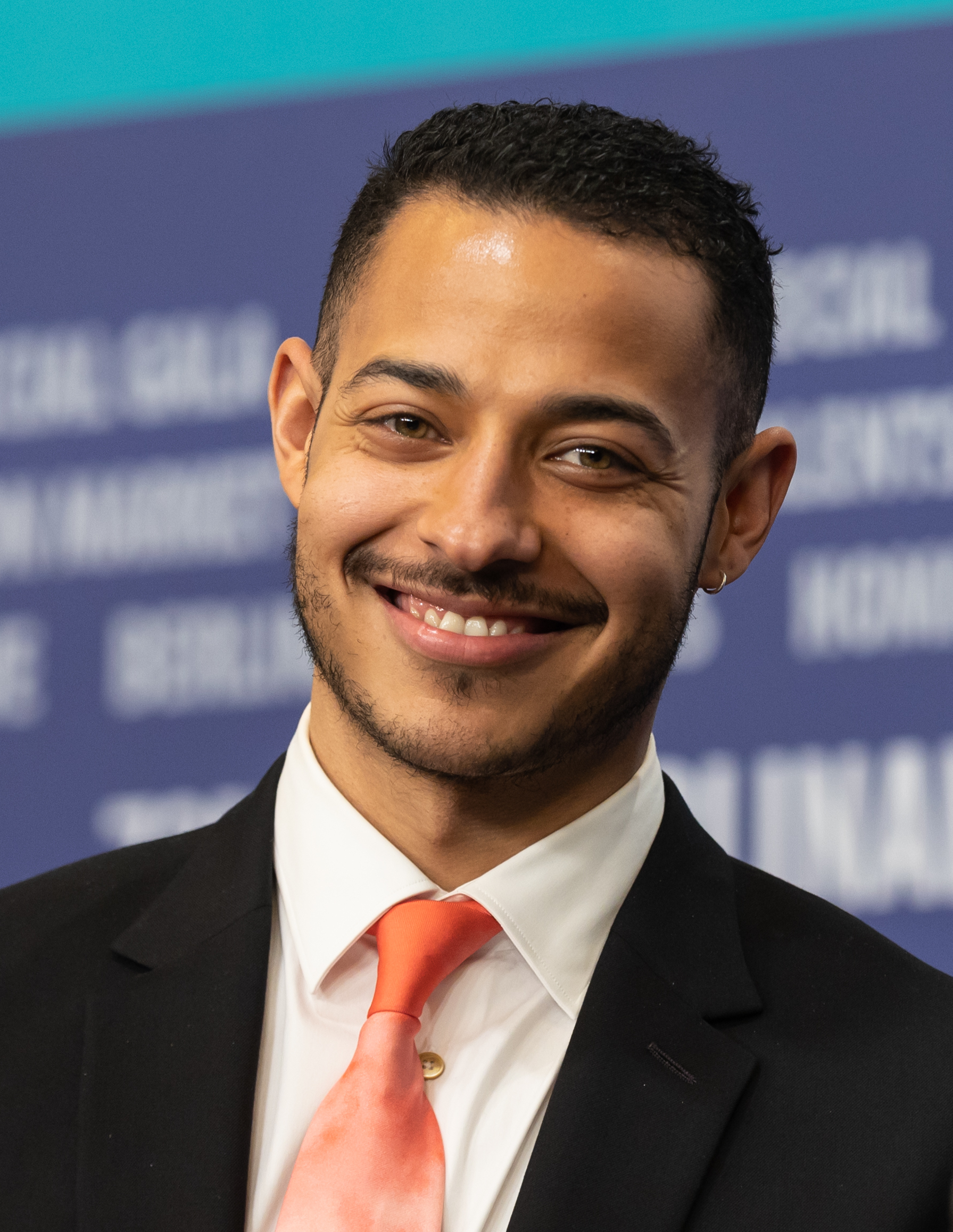
- McCormack at the Berlinale 2022
- Born: 22 January 1993 (age 33); Nenagh, County Tipperary, Ireland
- Education: Dublin Institute of Technology; Gaiety School of Acting
- Occupation: Actor
- Years active: 2015–present

Daryl McCormack (born 22 January 1993) is an Irish actor. Trained at the DIT Conservatory of Music and Drama and the Gaiety School of Acting, he made his acting debut in the soap opera Fair City (2015–2016). He appeared in the BBC series Peaky Blinders (2019–2022), the film Pixie (2020), and the Apple TV+ series Bad Sisters (2022). His portrayal of the title role in the sex comedy-drama Good Luck to You, Leo Grande (2022) earned him a nomination for the BAFTA Award for Best Actor in a Leading Role. In 2023, he won the Trophée Chopard from the Cannes Film Festival.

== Early life and education ==
McCormack was born on 22 January 1993 in Nenagh, County Tipperary. He is the son of an Irish mother, Theresa McCormack, and an African-American father, Alfred Thomas, from Baltimore. He maintains a good relationship with the paternal side of his family, especially his grandfather Percy Thomas, who would visit McCormack and take him to the theatre.

McCormack attended Gaelscoil Aonach Urmhumhan and St. Joseph's CBS. He played basketball and participated in the Choral Society. He went on to study at the Gaiety School of Acting, and at Dublin Institute of Technology's Conservatory of Music and Drama (now TU Dublin Conservatoire) graduating with a Bachelor of Arts in drama 2014.

== Career ==
McCormack made his West End debut in 2018 as Brendan in The Lieutenant of Inishmore. In his early career, he was almost cast in Star Wars: The Force Awakens. In 2019, he starred alongside Olivia Cooke and Ben Hardy in Barnaby Thompson's comedy-thriller film Pixie and joined the cast of Peaky Blinders for its fifth series as Isaiah Jesus.

In 2021 he was named as a Screen International star of tomorrow. He had a recurring role as Aram in the first season of the Amazon Prime fantasy series The Wheel of Time in 2021. In 2022, he starred as Matthew Claffin in Sharon Horgan's Apple TV+ series Bad Sisters and opposite Emma Thompson as the titular character of Sophie Hyde's film Good Luck to You, Leo Grande, the latter of which earned him nominations for two British Academy Film Awards and a British Independent Film Award.

In 2023, he starred in Alice Troughton's thriller film The Lesson and the BBC thriller series The Woman in the Wall.

McCormack appeared in Lee Isaac Chung's Twisters in 2024, and in 2025 he had roles in the family thriller Anniversary and in Rian Johnson's Wake Up Dead Man.

== Acting credits ==
=== Film ===
Year	Title	Role	Notes
2016	The Randomer	Ray	
2019	How to Fake a War	Matt	
2019	A Good Woman Is Hard to Find	PC Reeves	
2020	Pixie	Harland McKenna	
2022	Good Luck to You, Leo Grande	Leo Grande	
2023	The Lesson	Liam Sommers	
2024	Twisters	Jeb	
2025	Wake Up Dead Man	Cyrus "Cy" Draven	
2025	Anniversary	Rob Taylor	
2026	I See Buildings Fall Like Lightning	Conor	
2026	Rogue Trooper	Helm (voice)	
TBA	Cry to Heaven †		Post-production

=== Television ===
Year	Title	Role	Notes
2015–2016	Fair City	Pierce Devlin	36 episodes
2016	Dawn	Ukkanaak	Television film
2017	Vikings	Young Man	Episode: "The Prisoner"
2018	Immortality	Pio	Miniseries
2018	A Very English Scandal	Luke Mackenzie	Episode #1.1
2019	Cleaning Up	Ryan	Episode #1.5
2019–2022	Peaky Blinders	Isaiah Jesus	11 episodes
2021	I Am...	David	Episode: "I Am Maria"
2021	The Wheel of Time	Aram	3 episodes
2022–2024	Bad Sisters	Matthew Claffin	12 episodes
2023	The Woman in the Wall	Colman Akande	6 episodes
2026	Pride and Prejudice	Mr. Bingley	

=== Theatre ===
Year	Title	Role	Notes
2014	The Grapes of Wrath	Casey	Project Arts Centre, Dublin
2015	Romeo and Juliet	Romeo	Gate Theatre, Dublin
2015	Othello	Othello	Theatre Royal Waterford
2015	Enjoy		Project Arts Centre, Dublin
2017	A Whisper Anywhere Else	Garda	Peacock Stage, Abbey Theatre, Dublin
2017	The Mouth of a Shark		The Complex, Dublin
2018	The Lieutenant of Inishmore	Brendan	Noël Coward Theatre, London
2019	Citysong		Abbey Theatre, Dublin
2024	Long Day's Journey into Night	James Jr	Wyndham's Theatre, London

=== Music videos ===
Year	Song	Artist	Notes
2018	"Half a Life"	Roisin El Cherif	

== Awards and nominations ==
Year	Award	Category	Nominated work	Result	Ref.
2022	Peabody Awards	Entertainment	Bad Sisters	Won	
2022	British Independent Film Awards	Best Joint Lead Performance (shared with Emma Thompson)	Good Luck to You, Leo Grande	Nominated	
2022	Online Association of Female Film Critics	Best Breakthrough Performance	Good Luck to You, Leo Grande	Nominated	
2022	Women Film Critics Circle	Best Screen Couple (shared with Emma Thompson)	Good Luck to You, Leo Grande	Nominated	
2023	Cannes Film Festival	Trophée Chopard		Won	
2023	British Academy Film Awards	Best Actor in a Leading Role	Good Luck to You, Leo Grande	Nominated	
2023	British Academy Film Awards	Rising Star Award		Nominated	
2023	Black Reel Awards	Outstanding Breakthrough Performance, Male	Good Luck to You, Leo Grande	Nominated	
