= Crouching Tiger, Hidden Dragon: Sword of Destiny =

2016 American-Chinese wuxia film directed by Yuen Woo-ping

- Theatrical release poster
- Directed by: Yuen Woo-ping
- Screenplay by: John Fusco
- Based on: Iron Knight, Silver Vase by Wang Dulu
- Produced by: Charlie Nguyen; Harvey Weinstein
- Starring: Donnie Yen; Michelle Yeoh
- Cinematography: Newton Thomas Sigel
- Edited by: Jeff Betancourt
- Music by: Shigeru Umebayashi
- Production companies: The Weinstein Company; China Film Group; Pegasus Taihe Entertainment; Yucaipa Films
- Distributed by: Netflix; The Weinstein Company
- Release dates: February 18, 2016 (Hong Kong); February 19, 2016 (China); February 26, 2016 (United States)
- Running time: 101 minutes
- Countries: United States; China
- Language: English
- Box office: US$38.6 million

Crouching Tiger, Hidden Dragon: Sword of Destiny (Chinese: 卧虎藏龙：青冥宝剑) is a 2016 wuxia film directed by Yuen Woo-ping and written by John Fusco, based on the novel Iron Knight, Silver Vase by Wang Dulu. It is also a sequel to the 2000 film Crouching Tiger, Hidden Dragon. The film stars Donnie Yen, Michelle Yeoh, Harry Shum Jr., Natasha Liu Bordizzo, Jason Scott Lee and Eugenia Yuan. The film was released in Hong Kong on February 18, in mainland China on February 19 and worldwide on Netflix outside China on February 26, 2016.

== Plot ==
After eighteen years of solitude, Shu Lien emerges from retirement and travels to Peking, where the Green Destiny is located. In the forest, Shu Lien's carriage is attacked by warriors from the West Lotus clan. As she fights them, a masked horseman comes to her aid, and together they defeat the attackers, revealing one of them to be Wei Fang, a young man.

At the tower of the West Lotus warlord Hades Dai, a young woman named Snow Vase arrives. She attempts to kill Hades Dai, who fights her off, and she escapes. While fleeing from Shu Lien, Wei Fang is approached by a blind enchantress, who orders him to take her to Dai. She tells Dai that his great sword is surpassed by the Green Destiny, and prophesizes that if he is to rule the Martial World, he must obtain the sword. Dai is reluctant to storm the home of the emperor's brother, but the enchantress tells him to send Wei Fang, as the boy and the sword are bound by destiny itself.

Shu Lien arrives in Peking, and is taken to the house of Sir Te, who has recently died. Te's son greets her and reveals that the Green Destiny is kept on display at the house. That night, Wei Fang breaks into the house and attempts to steal the sword; Snow Vase appears and fights him. Shu Lien eventually arrives and captures the boy. Snow Vase asks Shu Lien to train her in the Iron Way.

At a tavern, Meng Sizhao (known as Silent Wolf in the West), the horseman who came to Shu Lien's aid, posts a warrant for warriors to join him protecting the House of Te. One warrior offers his thirty swordsmen for a high price, and attacks when rebuffed. Four warriors join Silent Wolf in the fight, and he recruits them to his cause: Flying Blade; Thunder Fist Chan; Silver Dart Shi; and Turtle Ma.

Shu Lien begins Snow Vase's training. That night, Silent Wolf and his warriors arrive at the Te compound. Shu Lien is shocked to see Silent Wolf, her former betrothed, as he was thought to have been killed by Hades Dai years before. He explains that he was in love with Shu Lien, but knew that Mu Bai was her true love, and had feigned his demise to seek a life of enlightenment in the mountains, as he knew that as long as he was alive, Li Mu Bai would not have asked Shu Lien for her hand.

Hades Dai rages that Wei Fang has failed in his raid, and sends his elite warrior, Mantis, to retrieve the sword. She arrives with her raiding party, and Silver Dart Shi and Turtle Ma are killed in the attack. Snow Vase attempts to free Wei Fang from his cage in the courtyard, but she is attacked by Mantis, and Wei Fang reveals the sword's location. The blind enchantress fights Shu Lien in the sword chamber, killing Sir Te's son when Shu Lien refuses to relinquish the sword.

Snow Vase later explains her connection to Wei Fang's past. His birth mother was the legendary swordswoman Han Mei. However, as a baby, he was swapped for the infant Snow Vase by her mother, a concubine. Han Mei raised Snow Vase as her own daughter, but never stopped looking for her son. Eventually finding him at West Lotus, she was mortally wounded by Hades Dai and, as she died, implored Snow Vase to find Wei Fang.

Knowing that Dai will send people to kill Wei Fang, Snow Vase frees Wei Fang, who steals the sword. Wei Fang's master, Iron Crow, arrives and helps Wei Fang escape and reach West Lotus. There, Wei Fang attempts to kill Hades Dai with the sword to avenge his mother. Shu Lien and the others arrive and fight Dai's army. Shu Lien fights the enchantress and kills her. Mantis kills Flying Blade and Thunder Fist, then fights Snow Vase, who defeats her. Silent Wolf fights and kills Hades Dai.

Snow Vase joins Shu Lien, Silent Wolf and Wei Fang as they take the Green Destiny to the Wudang Mountains. There, it will be kept safe yet again.

== Cast ==
- Donnie Yen as Silent Wolf
- Michelle Yeoh as Yu Shu Lien
- Harry Shum Jr. as Wei Fang
- Natasha Liu Bordizzo as Snow Vase
- Jason Scott Lee as Hades Dai
- Eugenia Yuan as Blind Enchantress
- Roger Yuan as Iron Crow
- JuJu Chan as Silver Dart Shi
- Chris Pang as Flying Blade
- Woon Young Park as Thunder Fist
- Darryl Quon as Turtle Ma

== Production ==
In January 2013, it was reported that a sequel to the 2000 film Crouching Tiger, Hidden Dragon would begin shooting in May, with Harvey Weinstein producing. Fight choreography would be by Yuen Woo Ping, The script by John Fusco would be based on the fifth and final book of the Crane-Iron Series, Iron Knight, Silver Vase. On March 18, 2013, actor Donnie Yen confirmed rumors that he had been offered a role in the new film. Around the same time, there were also conflicting reports on whether Michelle Yeoh had been asked to reprise her role of Yu Shu Lien.

On May 16, 2013, it was officially announced that the sequel had been approved by the studio. Initially titled Iron Knight, Silver Vase (the same title as its source material), the film was then re-titled Crouching Tiger, Hidden Dragon: The Green Legend. Donnie Yen was confirmed to star as Silent Wolf while Michelle Yeoh was confirmed to be reprising her role as Yu Shu Lien.

On August 20, 2013, it was reported that Zhang Ziyi was in talks to reprise her role as Jen Yu, but Zhang's agent Ji Lingling told the media that that was not true and stated, "Zhang would reprise her role only if the director was Ang Lee". If talks happened they did not result with Zhang's addition to the production. Instead Shuya Chang was cast while the character appears to have been renamed Han Mei, who is very similar in background as a rogue swordswoman of Wudan to the Jen Yu character.

On June 16, 2014, it was announced that the film would be co-produced by Pegasus Media, China Film Group Corporation, and The Weinstein Company, with a release date in 2016. On July 30, 2014, actor Harry Shum, Jr. was cast in the role of Wei-Fang.

While it was initially announced that production on the film would begin in June 2014 with location shooting in New Zealand and China, shooting was later bumped to August 2014. In September 2014, Variety reported that principal photography was underway in New Zealand.

The leaked order from the State Administration of Press, Publication, Radio, Film, and Television (SAPPRFT) Department of Film Management revealed the film's production was approved with amendments, including replacing the White Lotus Society with a fictitious martial arts faction, downplaying "Oppose the Qing, Restore the Ming" content, controlling the amount of gore and violence, and amending Yu Xiulian's line "A superior army breaks its enemy without fighting," to "The army which breaks its enemy without fighting is the superior one."

The film was shot in English and dubbed into Mandarin, unlike its predecessor which was the other way around.

== Release ==
On September 29, 2014, it was announced that Netflix and The Weinstein Company's Harvey Weinstein had made a deal to release the feature film Crouching Tiger, Hidden Dragon II: The Green Legend on Netflix. The sequel would be released via RADiUS-TWC simultaneously on Netflix and in selected IMAX theatres on August 28, 2015. The day after Netflix's announcement, American cinema chain Regal Entertainment Group announced that they would not show the film in their theaters. Regal's Russ Nunley declined to be part of "an experiment where you can see the same product on screens varying from three stories tall to 3 inches wide on a smart phone", as opposed to a regular theater experience. The same day, AMC, Carmike Cinemas, Cinemark Theatres, and Cineworld also announced they would not show the film. IMAX's CEO Richard Gelfond argued on the rejection by some chains, saying, "This is a test, and I can't tell you for sure that it's going to work, but I can tell you for sure that attempting to innovate is a good idea because as technology changes, viewers change, and we have to figure out what does or doesn't work". On July 7, 2015, the film was removed from the August 28, 2015 slot and was moved back to a fourth-quarter day and date release. The film was scheduled to be released in China on February 8, 2016, but was pushed back to February 19. The film was released worldwide outside China on Netflix and in 10–15 IMAX screens in the United States on February 26, 2016.

== Reception ==
The film grossed US$20.8 million on its opening weekend in China.

=== Critical reception ===
On the review aggregator website Rotten Tomatoes, 23% of 35 critics' reviews are positive, with an average rating of 5.15/10. The website's consensus reads: "Paling in comparison to its predecessor in every conceivable way, Sword of Destiny is a lazy sequel that never justifies its own cynical existence." Metacritic, which uses a weighted average, assigned the film a score of 47 out of 100, based on 13 critics, indicating "mixed or average" reviews.

Justin Chang of Variety wrote: "Trading on the pedigree of Ang Lee's 2000 Oscar winner but capturing none of its soulful poetry, this martial-arts mediocrity has airborne warriors aplenty but remains a dispiritingly leaden affair with its mechanical storytelling, purely functional action sequences and clunky English-language performances."

== Novel ==
In March 2015, Weinstein Books announced that a film tie-in novel had been written by Justin Hill. The novel was released on January 26, 2016.
