= The Jack in the Box: Awakening =

- Directed by: Lawrence Fowler
- Written by: Lawrence Fowler
- Produced by: Geoff Fowler; Lawrence Fowler
- Starring: Matt McClure; James Swanton; Mollie Hindle; Nicola Wright; Michaela Longden; Jason Farries; Victor Mellors; Erina Mashate
- Edited by: Lawrence Fowler
- Production company: Fowler Media
- Release date: January 3, 2022 (United Kingdom)
- Running time: 81 minutes
- Country: United Kingdom
- Language: English

The Jack in the Box: Awakening is a 2022 British supernatural horror film written and directed by Lawrence Fowler. It is the sequel to the 2019 film The Jack in the Box.

== Plot ==
Olga Marsdale, American owner of a derelict English country manor has only weeks left to live. She buys an ancient Jack-in-the-Box from a dealer, Mr Huxley. The deal is done but as he leaves he is attacked and killed by the Jack in the Box demon. Olga tells her son Edgar that she has done a deal with the demon; Edgar will supply five more victims to the demon and in exchange she will be cured of her terminal illness.

Amy, a new worker arrives to start work at the manor. She is told that no one is allowed to enter or leave the manor after 9pm every evening. She signs her contract and starts work. Amy meets the other staff members who work at the manor, Frank and Janet. It emerges that they are having an affair. They slip away to an outbuilding for some privacy but as Janet leaves, Edgar, who has been watching them, shuts Frank in the building with the Jack-in-the-Box and Frank is killed.

Edgar goes to see his girlfriend, Stacey and discovers that she has been cheating on him. He decides to make her one of the victims. Edgar tells Amy that Frank has left the manor. Amy has a conversation with Janet who is upset with Frank leaving. Olga tells Edgar the story of the Demons creation; how he started off as a human clown, and he was tricked into becoming the demon in the box.

Stacey comes to the manor. Edgar uses chloroform to disable her and she wakes up in an old attic with the Jack-in-the-Box. The Demon appears. Back in the manor, Janet and Amy have a conversation. Janet tells Amy she thinks Frank is weird. She is persuaded to tell Amy Edgar’s secret that he killed his own father. Edgar overhears Janet telling Amy this. Edgar goes back to see what has become of his girlfriend. He finds her with her eyes ripped out. He leaves, and she is dragged into the box by the Demon.

Amy is wandering around the house, trying to get a phone signal. When she comes across the Demon. The next thing she knows, she is waking up in bed. Edgar is in the room. She tells him she wants to go home. Edgar asks her why but she refuses to say. Edgar calls a doctor to attend her. The doctor intends to give her some pills, but instead decides to tell her to rest. Edgar meets him coming out of Amy‘s room and has an altercation in which it is obvious that Frank paid the doctor to give her the pills. The doctor leaves but can't get through the manor gates. He goes back to the house and is killed by the Demon.

Janet and Amy decide to escape from the Manor. They search for the key to the gates’ locking mechanism. During the search Janet is cornered by the Demon and is killed. Amy discovers Janet’s severed hand. Amy finds the key in Olga’s room, but is discovered by Olga who holds her at knifepoint. Amy stabs Olga with the knife and runs out of the house. She is caught by the Demon in the garden and during a struggle Amy stabs the Demon with a knife.

Edgar discovers his mother dying in her room. Amy crawls out of the gates and is rescued by a passer-by. Edgar comforts his mother as the Demon creeps out behind him. He accepts his fate as the Demon kills him. The Demon drags Edgar into the box, making the sixth victim. The deal has been completed and Olga lives.

== Cast ==
- Matt McClure as Edgar Marsdale
- James Swanton as Jack
- Mollie Hindle as Amy Proctor
- Nicola Wright as Olga Marsdale
- Michaela Longden as Janet
- Jason Farries as Frank
- Victor Mellors as Isaac Huxley
- Erina Mashate as Stacey

== Reception ==
Critics liked the English gothic horror feel of the film. As Phil Hoad of British national newspaper The Guardian said, "Despite the Hollywood precursors, there’s a distinct strain of English gothic here. Not just in the fusty bedrooms and cellars with blinking lights, which Fowler exploits atmospherically, but in the claustrophobic mother-son relationship".

Other reviewers were not so impressed, Guillermo Courau of Argentinian national newspaper La Nacion thought that "The second part of this unexpected low-budget success, without the surprise of the first instalment in relation to the physiognomy and customs of the murderous demon, decides to invent a new purpose and fails admirably."

Roger Crow of On: Yorkshire Magazine said "Faustian tale which starts with a great set-up, and a killer jump scare. But everything is just a bit stagey"

Kevin Wetmore of Horrorbuzz also highlighted the strange mother son relationship: "The actors handle the material well, with kudos given to McClure for making Edgar a more full character than the stereotype he could be. Showing the film often from his perspective offers a different understanding of the story, and when it works, it works well.

Neil Vagg of Get your Comic on said "Jack in the Box: Awakening is a compelling horror buried in the trappings of a gothic fairytale."

The Jack in the Box: Awakening was selected for the British Horror film Awards 2022.
