= Yunfeng Capital =

China-based private equity firm

Yunfeng Capital Limited
- Native name: 云锋基金
- Type: Private
- Industry: Investment management
- Founded: 2010; 16 years ago
- Founders: Jack Yun Ma; David Feng Yu
- Headquarters: Shanghai, China
- Products: Private equity Venture capital
- AUM: US$20 billion (2021)
- Subsidiaries: Yunfeng Financial
- Website: yfc.cn

Yunfeng Capital (YF Capital; Chinese: 云锋基金; pinyin: Yúnfēng jījīn) is a Shanghai-based private equity firm founded in 2010. It was founded by Jack Ma (founder and former executive chairman of Alibaba) and David Yu (founder of Target Media).

Yunfeng Capital is headquartered in Shanghai with additional offices in Beijing, Hangzhou and Hong Kong.

== Background ==
Yunfeng Capital was founded in 2010 by Jack Ma and David Yu. 'Yunfeng' is the result of combining the Chinese first names of Jack (Yun) Ma and David (Feng) Yu. Ma currently owns 40% of Yunfeng Capital although the firm has issued a statement that states "is not involved in the decision-making or operation".

The firm focuses on early and growth stage investments in companies from various sectors such as technology, healthcare, financial services and media. In addition, it provides consultation and advisory services to its selected portfolio companies.

In 2015, YF Capital (through Yunfeng Financial Holdings and several other investment vehicles) acquired Reorient Group Limited, a brokerage firm listed in Hong Kong. In November 2016 Reorient Group Limited was renamed to Yunfeng Financial.

In October 2022, The Information reported the firm was struggling to raise money in China due to domestic investors being concerned on the political risks of backing a firm affiliated with Ma.

Notable investments made by YF Capital include Kuaishou, Xiaomi, XPeng and Youku.
