= The Voyeurs =

2021 film directed by Michael Mohan

- Release poster
- Directed by: Michael Mohan
- Written by: Michael Mohan
- Produced by: Greg Gilreath; Adam Hendricks
- Starring: Sydney Sweeney; Justice Smith; Ben Hardy; Natasha Liu Bordizzo
- Cinematography: Elisha Christian
- Edited by: Christian Masini
- Music by: Will Bates
- Production company: Divide/Conquer
- Distributed by: Amazon Studios
- Release date: September 10, 2021
- Running time: 116 minutes
- Country: United States
- Language: English

The Voyeurs is a 2021 American erotic thriller film written and directed by Michael Mohan. Shot and set in Montreal, Quebec, Canada, it stars Sydney Sweeney and Justice Smith as a young couple who spy on and become obsessed by the lives of their neighbors across the street (Ben Hardy and Natasha Liu Bordizzo). Greg Gilreath and Adam Hendricks serve as producers under their Divide/Conquer banner.

The film was released by Amazon Studios on Amazon Prime Video on September 10, 2021. Despite receiving mixed reviews from critics, the film's streaming performance exceeded Amazon Studios' expectations.

== Plot ==
A young couple, Pippa and Thomas, move into their first apartment together in Montreal. They soon realize they can see directly into the apartment across the street, where a man with a professional studio is photographing a woman. Pippa and Thomas watch the couple have sex. They jokingly give their neighbors the pseudonyms Margot and Brent. That night, Thomas falls asleep early, preventing Pippa from seducing him which leaves her sexually frustrated.

Pippa, who works as a trainee optometrist at L'Optique, receives a bird feeder from her boss as a housewarming gift. She buys a pair of binoculars so she and Thomas can watch the couple. They often see Brent having sex with models while Margot is out. Growing bored in her relationship with Thomas, Pippa witnesses Brent standing shirtless at the window and is very clearly aroused by him.

Pippa expresses interest in knowing what the neighbors are saying and learns that Thomas knows a way to listen in on another room using a laser pointer; the process requires a reflective surface to send the laser beam back to them. When Brent and Margot throw a Halloween costume party in their apartment, Pippa and Thomas sneak in, posing as guests. Pippa plants a mirror in the apartment to allow her and Thomas to listen in on their conversations. They are unsettled to hear Margot confront Brent about his adultery; Brent denies it, assaults Margot, and rebukes her for her suspicions.

The next day, "Margot", whose real name is Julia, visits L'Optique, where she receives an eye exam from Pippa and orders a new set of glasses recommended by her. Julia invites Pippa to hang out. Pippa wants to warn Julia about "Brent's" adultery, but Thomas insists that she stop spying on them. Later, Pippa and Julia meet at a spa; Julia reveals that her husband is named Sebastian, or Seb, and is a well-known photographer.

Pippa observes Seb having a threesome and throwing a condom away afterward. She later discovers how to access Julia's wireless printer, which she uses to announce Seb's infidelity, mentioning the condom as proof. Thomas angrily confronts Pippa about being so invested in Julia's and Seb's lives. The next morning, Pippa apologizes to Thomas and promises to stop watching the neighbors. Then they see Seb discover Julia's body in the bathroom after she seemingly slit her own throat. Thomas blames Pippa for Julia's death, breaks up with her, and leaves.

Though heartbroken, Pippa continues to watch Seb, and one evening follows him to a bar. Seb sits by Pippa and they talk. He persuades her to pose nude for him at his apartment. To make her feel more comfortable, Seb also strips naked and they have passionate sex, finally satisfying her lust for him. Upon returning home to reconcile, Thomas consumes part of a drink in the refrigerator and pours the rest into the bird feeder. He sees Pippa having sex with Seb across the street. The next morning, Pippa finds Thomas dead in their apartment, having apparently hanged himself.

Pippa and her friend Ari attend Seb's exhibition, which turns out to be a collaboration with Julia, who is alive. Pippa and Thomas are revealed to be the subjects of the exhibition. Seb and Julia divulge that they own the apartment rented by Pippa and Thomas (whose lease included a clause saying that they consented to be photographed) and knew they were being watched. Pippa storms off, finds Seb's studio above her apartment, and trashes it. As she moves out, she notices dead birds on a grate below her bird feeder.

After an interview promoting their exhibition, Seb and Julia return home to find a congratulatory bottle of wine by their door. As they drink it, Pippa sends a message to the printer saying she knows they killed Thomas. They see her spying on them from the rooftop and chase her into L'Optique, where she tells them she deduced that, while she was having sex with Seb, Julia drugged Thomas's drink and staged his suicide. Pippa also reveals that she spiked their wine, causing first Julia and then Seb to pass out. Before he does so, Pippa tells Seb that she is going to make sure that she is the last thing either of them will ever see. Pippa then places the two under a LASIK machine and burns their corneas.

Two men move into Pippa and Thomas's former apartment. They observe Seb and Julia, both of whom are now blind and unaware of being watched. Pippa watches Seb and Julia from the rooftop before leaving her binoculars behind.

== Cast ==
- Sydney Sweeney as Pippa
- Justice Smith as Thomas
- Ben Hardy as Sebastian
- Natasha Liu Bordizzo as Julia
- Katharine King So as Ari
- Cameo Adele as Joni
- Jean Yoon as Dr. Sato

== Production ==
In September 2019, it was announced that Michael Mohan would direct the film from a screenplay he wrote, with Greg Gilreath and Adam Hendricks serving as producers under their Divide/Conquer banner, and Amazon Studios distributing. In November 2019, Sydney Sweeney, Justice Smith, Natasha Liu Bordizzo and Ben Hardy joined the cast of the film.

Principal photography began on October 29, and concluded in early December in Montreal, Canada.

== Release ==
The Voyeurs was released on September 10, 2021, on the Amazon Prime Video streaming service. This film's streaming performance exceeded Amazon Studios' expectations.

== Critical response ==
The film received mixed reviews from critics, who compared it unfavorably to its forebears in the voyeuristic thriller genre, such as Rear Window (1954) and Body Double (1984). On Rotten Tomatoes, The Voyeurs holds a 45% approval rating based on 38 reviews, with an average rating of 5.7/10. On Metacritic, the film has a weighted average score of 54 out of 100, based on 9 critics, indicating "mixed or average reviews".

Writing for the Chicago Sun-Times, Richard Roeper called The Voyeurs a "salacious and wildly implausible story that holds our interest for a while before flying off the cliff and into an abyss of creepy, ludicrous and ultimately ridiculous twists and turns". Nick Schager of Variety was also critical of the film, which he found "plays like rehashed leftovers cooked up for young viewers who've never seen any of its superior inspirations", such as Rear Window. In the San Francisco Chronicle, G. Allen Johnson called Mohan's script "pedestrian" and unfavorably compared his direction to that of David Lynch and Brian De Palma. "One suspects they would have a bit more fun and taken us further down the moral rabbit hole", Johnson wrote. "And the sex would have been better too."

Charles Bramesco of The Guardian was more appreciative of The Voyeurs. In a four-out-of-five star review, he called the film "the real deal, an ideal cocktail of funny, diabolical and perverted", and a timely update of Rear Window. "At last, an homage that dares to ask", Bramesco quipped, "what if Grace Kelly had been able to give the wheelchair-bound Jimmy Stewart a hand job the first time they both looked in on his neighbours across the way?"
