= Pixie (film) =

2020 film by Barnaby Thompson

- Theatrical release poster
- Directed by: Barnaby Thompson
- Written by: Preston Thompson
- Produced by: James Clayton; Barnaby Thompson
- Starring: Olivia Cooke; Ben Hardy; Daryl McCormack; Colm Meaney; Alec Baldwin
- Cinematography: John de Borman
- Edited by: Robbie Morrison
- Music by: David Holmes; Gerry Diver
- Production companies: Fragile Films; Ingenious Media; Northern Ireland Screen; Endeavor Content
- Distributed by: Paramount Pictures
- Release date: 23 October 2020
- Running time: 93 minutes
- Country: United Kingdom
- Language: English
- Box office: $688,554

Pixie is a 2020 British comedy thriller film directed by Barnaby Thompson. The film stars Olivia Cooke, Ben Hardy, Daryl McCormack, Colm Meaney, and Alec Baldwin.

== Plot ==
In Sligo, criminals Fergus and Colin gun down a gang of drug-trafficking priests, stealing fifteen kilos of MDMA. Discovering Fergus's plan to abscond to San Francisco with his ex-girlfriend Pixie, a jealous Colin kills Fergus and escapes with the drugs.

Left waiting for Fergus at the airport, Pixie drowns her sorrows at a club, where she catches the interest of best friends Frank and Harland. The friends' drug dealer Daniel reveals that Pixie is an aspiring photographer, leading Frank to visit her for an intimate portrait session. Waiting outside in the car, Harland drives over Colin when he arrives brandishing a gun, and he and Frank depart with Colin's body and the drugs.

Since her mother's death, Pixie remains close to her stepfather Dermot O'Brien, a local gangster and Fergus and Colin's boss, and her stepsister Summer. Dermot's son Mickey suspects Pixie of being involved in the robbery, which Dermot's psychotic enforcer Seamus is dispatched to investigate. Daniel sends Frank and Harland to his uncle Raymond in Dingle to sell the drugs, and Pixie forces the two friends to accept her help.

On the road with the drugs and Colin's body in the boot of the car, the trio stop at a petrol station. Pixie flirts with the clerk and impulsively robs the till, while Frank urges an altar boy to reconsider celibacy. They arrive in Dingle and meet with Raymond, who decides to rob them instead, but they escape after Pixie stabs him in the hand. Pixie reveals that she masterminded the robbery of the priests, but planned to betray both Fergus and Colin and flee to San Francisco alone.

Pixie seduces Frank and Harland together, but they are captured by Seamus, who has killed the petrol station clerk and Raymond to hunt them down. Forcing Frank and Harland to dig their own graves, Seamus opens the boot to find Colin still alive, and they gun each other down. Pixie confronts a dying Colin with his own betrayal: her mother was battling cancer and died in hospital, but was actually suffocated by Colin. He admits he was acting on Mickey's orders, and she finishes both him and Seamus off, before arranging to sell the drugs back to Father Hector McGrath, the corrupt priests' leader and Dermot's nemesis.

The trio lie in wait at a church, where Hector and his gang of clergy find themselves in a standoff with Dermot and his men. A shootout ensues, and Mickey prepares to kill Pixie, having hated her and her mother out of jealousy, but is distracted by her ex-boyfriend Gareth, Hector's son. A vengeful Pixie shoots Mickey in the leg before sharing a kiss with Gareth, and she is held at gunpoint by Hector, who is killed by Dermot. Harland manages to retrieve the money from the deal, and Pixie bids farewell to Summer before the trio drive away.

At the airport, Pixie and the friends part ways, and Frank and Harland open the bag of cash to discover Pixie's photos of Frank instead. Having avenged her mother and finally got the better of everyone, Pixie sets off for San Francisco.

== Cast ==
- Olivia Cooke as Pixie Hardy
- Ben Hardy as Frank McCullen
- Daryl McCormack as Harland McKenna
- Rory Fleck Byrne as Colin
- Fra Fee as Fergus
- Turlough Convery as Mickey
- Chris Walley as Daniel
- Pat Shortt as Father Daly
- Frankie McCafferty as Father McGinley
- Ned Dennehy as Seamus
- Dylan Moran as Raymond
- Sebastian de Souza as Gareth
- Colm Meaney as Dermot O'Brien
- Alec Baldwin as Father Hector McGrath

== Production ==
In August 2019, it was announced that shooting for the film had begun in Northern Ireland, with Barnaby Thompson directing. Olivia Cooke, Ben Hardy and Alec Baldwin were among the announced cast. Locations include Killough.

== Release ==
Pixie was released in the United Kingdom on 23 October 2020 by Paramount Pictures.

== Reception ==
=== Critical response ===
On the review aggregator website Rotten Tomatoes, the film holds an approval rating of 76% based on reviews from 55 critics, with an average rating of 6.3/10. The website's critics consensus reads, "Pixie borrows shamelessly from multiple like-minded heist thrillers; fortunately, Olivia Cooke's outstanding lead performance makes for a great getaway vehicle." Metacritic, which uses a weighted average, assigned a score of 45 out of 100, based on 8 reviews indicating "mixed or average reviews".
