= Zhejiang Hupan Entrepreneurship Research Center =

Private enterprise in Hangzhou, China

Zhejiang Hupan Entrepreneurship Research Center (Chinese: 浙江湖畔创业研学中心) is a private enterprise in Hangzhou, Zhejiang, China. Despite the early use of "university" as a suffix, the enterprise has never been accredited or registered as an educational institution.

It was founded in 2015 by Jack Ma, founder of Alibaba Group.

== History ==
In 2015, Jack Ma and several fellow business executives decided to found a business school based in China. This organization has 8 co-founders including Jack Ma, Feng Lun, Guo Guangchang, Shi Yuzhu, Shen Guojun, Qian Yingyi, Cai Hongbin and Shao Xiaofeng.

Ma took the name Hupan, which means “lakeside,” from the apartment he lived in when he co-founded Alibaba in 1999. Lakeside Gardens is where the first 18 Alibaba employees worked together in the company’s early days.

The institution also offers online classes.

Jack Ma stepped down from presidency of the enterprise in 2021. The organization announced it would restructure, including changing its name to Zhejiang Hupan Entrepreneurship Research Center and disassociating itself from Ma.

== Former students ==
- Justin Sun, cryptocurrency business owner
- Tiger Hu, singer-songwriter and producer
