= Gong Shou Dao =

On That Night... While We Dream
- Traditional Chinese: 功守道
- Simplified Chinese: 功守道
- Hanyu Pinyin: Gōng Shǒu Dào
- Directed by: Wen Zhang
- Written by: Wen Zhang
- Produced by: Jet Li
- Starring: Jack Ma; Jet Li; Donnie Yen; Wu Jing; Tony Jaa; Jacky Heung; Asashōryū Akinori; Zou Shiming; Natasha Liu Bordizzo
- Cinematography: Yang Jun
- Edited by: Angie Lam
- Music by: An Wei
- Production company: Alibaba Group
- Distributed by: Youku
- Release date: 11 November 2017 (China)
- Running time: 20 minutes
- Country: China
- Language: Mandarin

Gong Shou Dao (Chinese: 功守道), also known as On That Night... While We Dream is a 2017 Chinese kung fu short film directed by Wen Zhang and produced by Jet Li. The film stars Jack Ma, Jet Li, Donnie Yen, Wu Jing, Tony Jaa, Jacky Heung, Asashōryū Akinori, Zou Shiming, and Natasha Liu Bordizzo. The film was released on November 11, 2017, during the Double 11 Shopping Carnival.

== Plot ==
One day, Master Ma is walking down the street, when suddenly he sees the words "Huashan Sect" (华山派) on a sign. He closes his eyes and imagines himself duelling different martial arts masters.

== Cast ==
- Jack Ma as Master Ma
- Jet Li as Old Servant
- Donnie Yen as Master Yen
- Wu Jing as Master Jing
- Tony Jaa as Master Jaa
- Jacky Heung as Master Zuo
- Asashōryū Akinori as Master Long
- Zou Shiming as Master Zou
- Natasha Liu Bordizzo as Master Yu
- Tong Dawei as Policeman Tong
- Mark Huang as Policeman Ming
- Li Chen as Policeman Chen
- Shao Xiaofeng as Police Inspector

Jason Statham, Manny Pacquiao and Gennady Golovkin appear as themselves in separately filmed video messages for Ma in the end credits.

== Production ==
Wen Zhang was hired as the director. Yuen Woo-ping, Sammo Hung and Tony Ching were hired as choreographers. The film is Chinese e-commerce tycoon Jack Ma's debut.

== Music ==
The theme song Feng Qing Yang (《风清扬》) is sung by singer Faye Wong and Jack Ma. The song's title Feng Qing Yang is the name of a top martial artist in another one of Louis Cha's wuxia novels, The Smiling, Proud Wanderer.

== Release ==
On October 28, 2017, Jack Ma released a poster in his Sina Weibo. The movie was released in China on November 11, 2017, and was watched 170 million times online in a couple months, according to Alibaba.
