= Jack Ma Foundation =

Philanthropic foundation

The Jack Ma Foundation (JMF) is the philanthropic foundation of Chinese businessman Jack Ma. It was established in 2014.

== History ==
In September 2018, Ma announced that he would retire from the company he founded and the source of his wealth, internet merchandiser Alibaba, in order to pursue educational work, philanthropy, and environmental causes.

In 2019, the JMF started the Netpreneur Initiative that grants 10 prizes of $1 million each to 10 African entrepreneurs per year and launched a fund with $14.6 million to develop education in Tibet.

In 2020, the JMF was announced as one of the alliance partners of Prince William's Earthshot Prize to find solutions to environmental issues.

In January 2025, the JMF marked the 10th anniversary of the Rural Teachers Initiative, with Ma addressing a group of educators as a former teacher. He also accepted an honorary professorship from the University of Hong Kong's business school in November 2024.

=== Coronavirus ===
In response to the coronavirus pandemic, the Jack Ma Foundation announced its intention to donate a total of 500,000 testing kits and one million masks to the United States, stating "we join hands with Americans in these difficult times." The Foundation, along with the Alibaba Group, also donated similar materials to Iran, Italy, Spain, Belgium, Japan, and South Korea. Ma also announced a donation of 1.1 million tests, six million masks, and 60,000 protective suits to all African countries to combat the pandemic. For instance, in Nigeria, senior health official Abdulaziz Abdullahi said that the country had received 100,000 face masks, 1,000 protective gowns, and 20,000 test kits.

In March 2020, the JMF published Handbook of COVID-19 Prevention and Treatment, a detailed 68-page book edited by Tingbo Liang that documents the clinical experience obtained at the First Affiliated Hospital of the Zhejiang University School of Medicine in the fight against the COVID-19 pandemic.

While Ma is a member of the Chinese Communist Party, some analysts nevertheless believe that the Chinese government may view Ma's philanthropic efforts unfavorably.
