= Anniversary (2025 film) =

American film by Jan Komasa

- Theatrical release poster
- Directed by: Jan Komasa
- Screenplay by: Lori Rosene-Gambino
- Story by: Jan Komasa; Lori Rosene-Gambino
- Produced by: Nick Wechsler; Steve Schwartz; Paula Mae Schwartz; Kate Churchill
- Starring: Diane Lane; Kyle Chandler; Madeline Brewer; Zoey Deutch; Phoebe Dynevor; Mckenna Grace; Daryl McCormack; Dylan O'Brien
- Cinematography: Piotr Sobociński Jr.
- Edited by: Michał Czarnecki
- Music by: Danny Bensi; Saunder Jurriaans
- Production companies: Fifth Season; Chockstone Pictures; Churchill Films; Metropolitan Films International
- Distributed by: Lionsgate Films; Roadside Attractions
- Release date: October 29, 2025
- Running time: 111 minutes
- Country: United States
- Language: English
- Budget: $7 million
- Box office: $672,711

Anniversary is a 2025 American dystopian political thriller film directed by Jan Komasa and starring Diane Lane, Kyle Chandler, Madeline Brewer, Zoey Deutch, Phoebe Dynevor, Mckenna Grace, Daryl McCormack, and Dylan O'Brien. It was released on October 29, 2025.

== Plot ==
The affluent Taylor clan gathers for the 25th wedding anniversary of liberal Georgetown professor Ellen and restaurateur Paul. Attending are their four children: Cynthia, an environmental lawyer like her husband Rob; Anna, a caustic lesbian comic; the teenager Birdie, a bohemian would-be wildlife scientist; and Josh, an unsuccessful novelist – and his poised fiancée Liz Nettles, who practices greetings in a mirror before meeting the family.

Liz is polite, but Ellen realizes she was a student who left Georgetown after Ellen challenged her totalitarian ideas in a paper advocating a one-party state. Liz shocks Ellen by gifting her new book, written with Josh's help, The Change: The New Social Contract, the cover showing an American flag with the stars placed at the center, supposedly to represent Americans uniting in the political center. Leaving, Liz tells Ellen privately that she is not afraid of Ellen anymore.

Two years later, The Change has become hugely influential; at the Taylors' Thanksgiving gathering, Anna's assistant/lover says it helped her reconnect to her parents. Liz is now pregnant with twins, and Josh, with whom she's now married, with a makeover, having grown more confident, even arrogant. However, the four Taylor women are not enthusiastic about Liz or the book, which is sponsored by the Cumberland Corporation. Josh reveals that Liz has been invited to be a guest lector at Georgetown and she asks Ellen to do her introduction, something she is strongly against.

Liz gives Birdie a password to a noted virology database. Shortly after, a video of Ellen vandalizing a neighbor's "Change" American flag goes viral. In the confrontational atmosphere, Liz first feels sick, then appears to break water and go to the hospital, though later, it seems she only urinated from stress.

The following year, Ellen has lost her Georgetown job. A totalitarian "Change" society is in place. Anna, beaten up when making fun of the "Change" movement at a show, has been in hiding for the past six months, with the family hiring a private investigator to find out her whereabouts. Birdie's journalist-student boyfriend Moses drops by at the celebration of Paul's 60th birthday to help her track Anna using the dark web, but feels threatened by Josh mentioning a journalist who was dismembered, and leaves. Liz offers Birdie an internship at Cumberland studying virology, which disgusts Ellen, who threatens to kill Liz. Rob joyfully announces that Cynthia is pregnant; however, when they leave, she reveals she had an abortion, fearful of bringing a child into the currently troubled world. Enraged and grieving, Rob drives off and leaves her behind. Josh offers to support Paul's failing restaurant, but Paul suspects he does it to find Anna. Josh and Liz's au pair Gerda shows Ellen a message from Anna as proof of life.

A year later, things have become worse. There is a census to track Americans, Birdie's boyfriend Moses and his parents fled the country among many journalists, scientists, academics, intellectuals, artists and free thinkers. The Taylor clan hasn't celebrated any birthday, anniversary or holiday together. Rob has joined the "Change". Cynthia, now addicted to sleeping pills, lives with her parents. Census-takers ("Enumerators") arrive and ask Ellen and Paul, whose restaurant has closed, questions designed to find Anna, enraging them. The Enumerators show photos of Birdie at a protest, threatening jail; Ellen capitulates and endorses the "Change", angering Birdie, who says Ellen has sold out.

The next year, at the Taylors' 30th anniversary party, Liz, dressed in red as Ellen was at the first anniversary, speaks privately to Ellen, asking her to help with Josh's unspecified strange behavior; Ellen slaps her. Liz and Josh then invite Ellen and Paul to dance to a favorite song. While they dance, a clown unexpectedly arrives. The clown enters the house and turns out to be Anna, who speaks to the confused, despondent Cynthia.

Josh gets alerted by a partygoer about an attack on Cumberland and enters the house. The television news announces a horrific bio-weapon attack at the Washington, D.C. Cumberland headquarters, where Birdie works; Birdie appears on camera and performs a suicide bombing. Ellen and Paul are devastated, sobbing; Anna joins them. Josh notifies the police of Anna’s whereabouts.

Cynthia stabs Josh, though not fatally. She then exits the house with the bloody knife, and police officers open fire. The police also shoot at Anna, who runs from the house and dives into the sea.

The police enter the house and put bags over Ellen's and Paul's heads; Paul tries to soothe Ellen by reminding her of when he first met Ellen, in front of René Magritte's The Lovers painting, which shows lovers with cloth-covered heads. Josh asks a policeman to keep his parents together, but the police ignore him and wrestle him to the ground. A policeman asks Liz what to do; she says that Josh is with his parents. The police remove the Taylors.

Liz, having destroyed the Taylor family, looks at a picture of them in happier days; she looks distraught, but her reverie is interrupted by a small smile.

== Cast ==
- Diane Lane as Ellen Taylor, a professor
- Kyle Chandler as Paul Taylor, Ellen's husband
- Zoey Deutch as Cynthia Taylor, Ellen and Paul's daughter
- Mckenna Grace as Birdie Taylor, Ellen and Paul's teenage daughter
- Dylan O'Brien as Josh Taylor, Ellen and Paul's only son
- Daryl McCormack as Rob Thompson, Cynthia's husband
- Madeline Brewer as Anna Taylor, Ellen and Paul's daughter
- Phoebe Dynevor as Liz Nettles, Josh's fiancée
- Sky Yang as Moses
- Rebecca O'Mara as Enumerator

== Production ==
It was announced in May 2023 that Jan Komasa would be directing the film. Lori Rosene-Gambino wrote the screenplay. The cast includes Diane Lane, Kyle Chandler, Madeline Brewer, Zoey Deutch, Phoebe Dynevor, Mckenna Grace, and Daryl McCormack. Filming began in Dublin, Ireland, in July 2023. Production was initially affected as a result of the 2023 WGA/SAG-AFTRA strike, but the film was later granted a waiver to continue production.

== Release ==
Anniversary was released by Lionsgate Films on October 29, 2025. Shortly after its release, Frank Wuliger, a partner at Gersh representing director Jan Komasa, said that he believed that Lionsgate "buried [Anniversary] because it is incendiary", while producer Nick Wechsler said that the film was difficult to market due to audiences being "afraid" of political films.

Anniversary started streaming on UK and Ireland Netflix on February 1, 2026. It entered the Film Chart at No 2, and then immediately went to No 1 where it stayed for most of that first week. As of February 12, 2026, it was still in the Top 4 films.

Anniversary started streaming on Hulu in the U.S. on March 13, 2026. It entered the Film Chart at No 8, and quickly went to No 1 the next day (March 14).

== Reception ==
=== Critical response ===
On the review aggregator website Rotten Tomatoes, 67% of 69 critics' reviews are positive, with an average rating of 6.5/10. The website's consensus reads: "Parlaying a strained state of the union into narrative suspense, Anniversary's effectiveness as a political parable comes to a split decision while its status as a solid thriller wins plenty of support." Metacritic, which uses a weighted average, assigned the film a score of 57 out of 100, based on 13 critics, indicating "mixed or average" reviews. The ensemble cast's performances were highly praised, especially Lane who received a Satellite Award nomination for Best Actress in a Motion Picture – Drama.

Sheri Linden of The Hollywood Reporter praised the film in her review, writing: "Lane is fantastic at expressing Ellen's seething, unbound disdain for Liz and everything she represents. In comparison to her reactiveness and condescension, Paul, beautifully underplayed by Chandler [...] O'Brien delivers a blood-chilling metamorphosis. He holds the screen with a tightly bound menace." Deadline Hollywood's Pete Hammond praised Lane and Chandler's performances, writing: "Lane is still one of the most talented actors out there and carries this off in style. Chandler is well-matched here as well [...] With this cast, it's a shame it doesn't have much more of a profile. What it has to say is important, to say the least." Matt Zoller Seitz of RogerEbert.com gave the film 3.5 out of 4 stars, praising its boldness, writing: "That Anniversary depicts oppressed and terrorized Americans doing riskier things under far bleaker circumstances saves it from doomerism, leaving viewers with shreds of hope." The Film Stage's Rory O'Connor praised Komasa's bold transition to English-language filmmaking, calling the film "relentlessly watchable" and comparing its energy to a "battering ram". He also highlighted the performances from Lane, Chandler and Dynevor, though noted occasional overacting and uneven tone, describing the film as "a nasty exploitation flick in prestige clothing".

Some critics rejected the film's deliberate avoidance of political specificity, wishing instead for it to declare itself more openly in 2025's ideological conflict. Ross McIndoe of Slant Magazine wrote that the film "strains credulity", adding: "This is an overtly political film that's hesitant to express its own political views." McIndoe still praised the acting, calling Brewer's performance "delightfully spiky" and O'Brien's performance "a skin-crawling portrayal, and one with far too many real-life parallels". IndieWire's David Ehrlich also highlighted the acting, but took issue with the film's refusal to take a clearer political stance, seeing its dystopian abstraction as incomplete if not evasive, writing: "Taut and well-acted as this queasy little thriller can be, its unflinching tale of corporate authoritarianism is much too streamlined to reflect the emotional truth of watching totalitarianism in motion." Pavel Snapkou of Showbiz by PS was more critical, writing that the film "tries to be about everything at once" and lacks a clear stance on its political themes. He also found it "too self-important and out of touch," despite praising the Thanksgiving dinner sequence and the cast's performances, ultimately calling the film "a safe and slightly tone-deaf political thriller".

=== Accolades ===
Award	Date of ceremony	Category	Recipient	Result	Ref.
Satellite Awards	March 8, 2026	Best Actress in a Motion Picture – Drama	Diane Lane	Nominated	
Washington D.C. Area Film Critics Association	December 7, 2025	Joe Barber Award for Best Portrayal of Washington, D.C.	Anniversary	Nominated	

== See also ==
- All About Eve (1950): Joseph L. Mankiewicz film about a young understudy pathologically supplanting an older role model/rival.
- Teorema (1968): Pier Paolo Pasolini film about a seductive stranger invading a wealthy bourgeois family and driving them to madness and destruction.
