= Mad About the Boy: The Noel Coward Story =

2023 documentary film

Mad About the Boy: The Noël Coward Story is a 2023 documentary film about the life of Noël Coward. It was directed by Barnaby Thompson.
