= John Thompson (journalist) =

British journalist (1928–2017)

John Thompson CBE
- Born: John Brian Thompson; 8 June 1928; Bangor, County Down, Northern Ireland
- Died: 18 May 2017 (aged 88)
- Education: Pembroke College, Oxford
- Occupations: Journalist and radio regulator
- Known for: First director of radio of the Independent Broadcasting Authority
- Notable credit: The Observer
- Spouse: Sally Waterhouse
- Children: 3, including Barnaby Thompson

John Brian Thompson CBE (8 June 1928 – 18 May 2017) was a British journalist and radio regulator who was influential in the development of independent radio in the United Kingdom, becoming known as "the father of independent radio". He had a career on The Daily Express and The Observer, where he was early editor of the colour magazine, before becoming the first director of radio of the Independent Broadcasting Authority (IBA) from 1972 to 1987. He was succeeded by his deputy Peter Baldwin.

== Background ==
Thompson was born in Bangor, County Down, to Lilian (nee Sutton) and John Thompson, and was eight years old when he moved with his family moved to south London. He was educated at St Paul's School, and went on to read history at Pembroke College, Oxford.

He began a career in journalism and in 1957 was sent to New York to write a column for Lord Beaverbrook's Daily Express. Joining The Observer in 1962 after his return to London, Thompson became the paper's news editor before, from 1966 until 1970, he served as editor of The Observer's colour magazine, being remembered for putting rock band The Who on its front cover and for taking on cookery writer Jane Grigson, then a young unknown.

From 1973 to 1987, Thompson was director of radio at the Independent Broadcasting Authority (IBA), responsible for creating commercial local radio in the UK.

== Personal life ==
Thompson was married to Sally Waterhouse, a BBC producer, and they had three children: Piers, Barnaby and Eliza.

== Awards and recognition ==
Thompson was appointed a CBE in 1980 for services to radio. On his retirement from the IBA he was honoured with a Fellowship at the Radio Academy.
