= Jack Ma =

Chinese business magnate and investor (born 1964)

- 马云
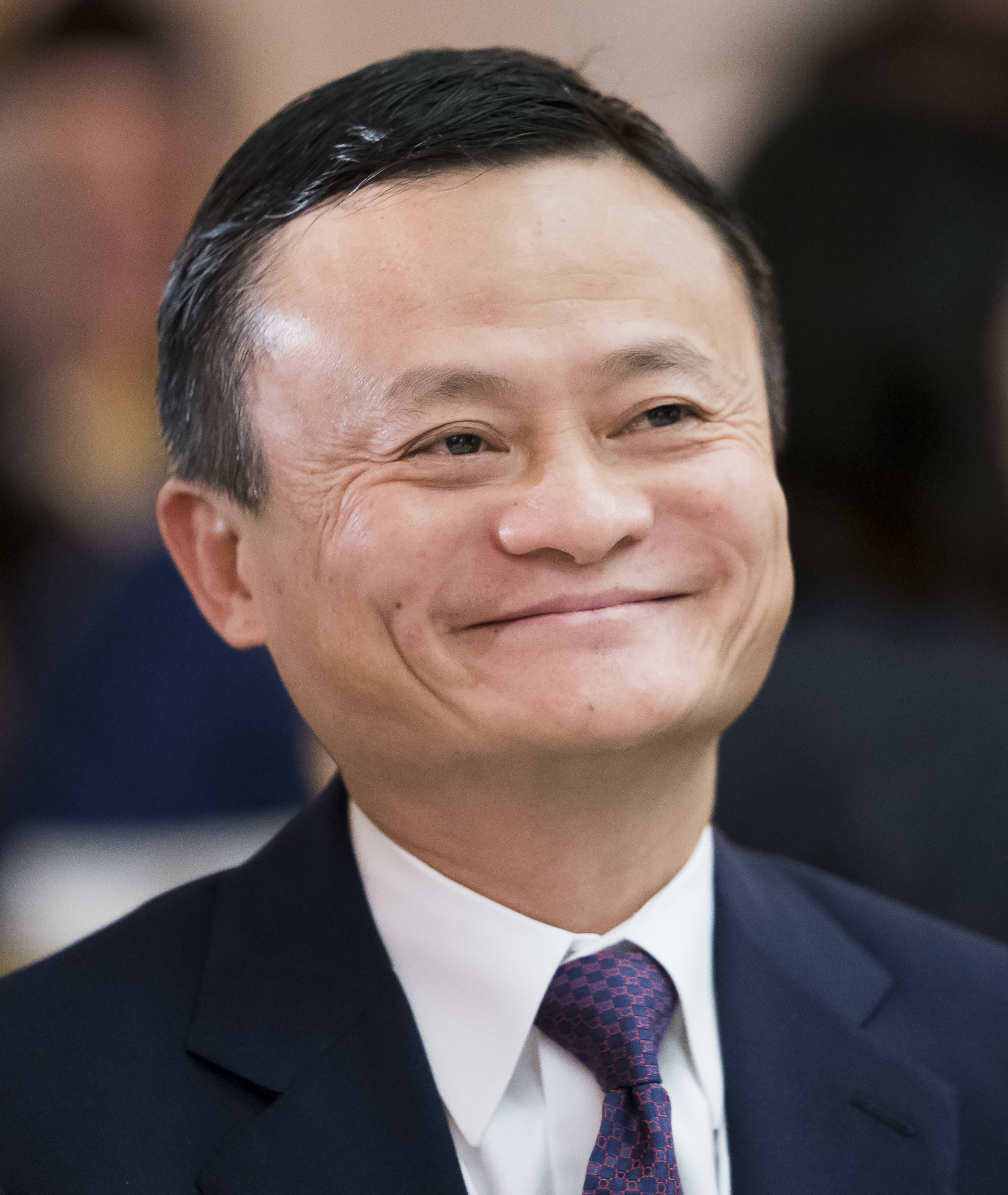
- Ma in 2018
- Born: Ma Yun; 10 September 1964 (age 62); Hangzhou, Zhejiang, China
- Education: Hangzhou Normal University (BA)
- Occupations: Business magnate; Investor; Philanthropist; Teacher
- Known for: Co-founder of Alibaba Group
- Title: Founder of Jack Ma Foundation; Co-founder of Yunfeng Capital
- Political party: Chinese Communist Party
- Spouse: Zhang Ying
- Children: 2 (a son and a daughter)

Chinese name
- Simplified Chinese: 马云
- Traditional Chinese: 馬雲
Transcriptions
Standard Mandarin
- Hanyu Pinyin: Mǎ Yún
- Bopomofo: ㄇㄚˇ ㄩㄣˊ
- Gwoyeu Romatzyh: Maa Yun
- Wade–Giles: Ma^{3} Yün^{2}
- Tongyong Pinyin: Mǎ Yún
- IPA: [mà y̌n]
Wu
- Suzhounese: Mo^{6} Yun^{2}
Yue: Cantonese
- Yale Romanization: Máh Wàhn
- Jyutping: Maa5 Wan4
- IPA: [ma˩˧ wɐn˩]

Ma Yun (Chinese: 马云; pinyin: Mǎ Yún; born 10 September 1964), also known as Jack Ma, is a Chinese businessman and philanthropist. He is the founder of the Jack Ma Foundation, and co-founder of Alibaba Group and Yunfeng Capital. He is one of the richest men in China with a net worth of approx US$27.5 billion.

After taking the gaokao three times, Ma earned a bachelor's degree in English from Hangzhou Normal University in 1988 and was assigned as a lecturer at Hangzhou Dianzi University. A pioneer of Internet business in China, he founded a translation agency in 1994 and launched its website the following year, before leaving his university position to run an online yellow pages service, which was acquired by China Telecommunications Corporation in 1996. Following an uneasy collaboration with the state-owned enterprise, Ma left the company in 1997 and went on to develop websites for China's Ministry of Foreign Trade and Economic Cooperation. In 1999, he co-founded Alibaba Group, initially as a business-to-business (B2B) e-commerce marketplace and later expanded into a multinational conglomerate.

Ma has been the face of Chinese entrepreneurship. His influence declined after Chinese authorities halted the anticipated initial public offering (IPO) of his financial technology company, Ant Group, in 2020, following his public criticism of regulators for prioritizing risk aversion over innovation.

== Early life and education ==
Ma was born in Hangzhou, Zhejiang, on 10 September 1964. He became interested in learning the English language as a young boy and began practicing it with English-speaking visitors who frequented the Hangzhou International Hotel. At the age of 12, Ma bought a pocket radio and began listening to English radio stations frequently. For nine years, Ma rode 27 km (17 miles) on his bicycle every day to work as a tour guide of Hangzhou for foreigners in order to practice his English. He became pen pals with one of those foreigners, who nicknamed him "Jack" because he found it hard to pronounce his Chinese name. When Ma was 13 years old, he was forced to transfer to Hangzhou No. 8 Middle School as he kept getting in fights. In his primary school days, Ma struggled academically, and it took two years for him to gain acceptance at an ordinary Chinese high school, as he only got 31 points in mathematics on the Chinese high school entrance exam.

In 1980, while he was riding his bike to practice English with tourists, he met Ken Morley, who was traveling with his family with the Australia-China Friendship Society. Ken's son, David, became pen pals with Ma and kept in touch after the family left China. Years later, the Morleys hosted Ma in Australia, changing the course of his life completely. Ma later said: "Those 29 days in Newcastle were crucial in my life. Without those 29 days, I would never have been able to think the way I do today."

In 1982, at the age of 18, Ma failed the Chinese college entrance exam on his initial attempt, obtaining only 1 point in mathematics. Afterwards, he and his cousin applied to be waiters at a nearby hotel. His cousin was hired, but Ma was rejected on the grounds that he was "too skinny, too short, and in general, protruded a bad physical appearance that may have potentially ended up hurting the restaurant's image and possibly tarnishing its reputation."

In 1983, Ma failed his college entrance exam for the second time. However, his math score improved, increasing from his previous attempt to 19 points. The following year, Ma remained relentlessly determined to pursue higher education despite strong opposition from his family, who wanted him to choose a different career path. Undeterred, he decided to take the entrance exam a third time in 1984. On his third attempt, Ma scored 89 points on the math section, marking a significant improvement from his previous two attempts. Nonetheless, the minimum benchmark entrance requirement would have rendered Ma ineligible to be accepted into university, since his score was five points below the standardized minimum threshold for him to qualify.

However, Ma's academic fortunes changed since the enrollment target for prospective majors in Hangzhou Normal University's Department of English was not met, as some prospective students had the opportunity to be accepted and promoted into it, with Ma himself having ended up being promoted to the department's foreign language major. Having realized his aspirations to pursue higher education after enrolling at Hangzhou Normal University, Ma's academic performance began to improve substantially as he steadily achieved scholarly excellence over the course of his undergraduate studies. In recognition of his merits as evinced by his burgeoning academic achievements, Ma distinguished himself scholastically by consistently being ranked as among the top five students in Hangzhou Normal University's foreign language department due to the extensive English-language skills that he honed. He was also elected as the chairman of the student union and later became the chairman of the Hangzhou Federation of Students, serving in that capacity for two terms.

In 1988, Ma earned a BA degree in English from Hangzhou Normal University. After graduation, he became a lecturer in English and international trade at Hangzhou Dianzi University. Ma also claims to have applied to Harvard Business School ten times consecutively, being rejected every time.

== Business career ==
=== Early career ===
According to Ma's autobiographical speech, after graduating from Hangzhou Normal University in 1988, Ma applied for 31 different odd entry-level jobs and was rejected for every single one. "I went for a job with the KFC; they said, 'you're no good'", Ma told interviewer Charlie Rose. "I even went to KFC when it came to my city. Twenty-four people went for the job. Twenty-three were accepted. I was the only guy [rejected] ...". During this period, China was nearing the end of its first decade following Deng Xiaoping's reform and opening up.

In 1994, Ma heard about the Internet and also started his first company, Hangzhou Hope Translation Agency (杭州海博翻译社), and launched its website the next year. In early 1995, he travelled abroad to the United States on behalf of the Hangzhou municipal government with colleagues who had helped introduce him to the Internet. Although he found information related to beer from many countries, he was surprised to find none from China. He also tried to search for general information about China and again was surprised to find none. So he and his friend created an "ugly" website pertaining to information regarding Chinese beer. He launched the website at 9:40 am, and by 12:30 pm he had received emails from prospective Chinese investors wishing to know more about him and his website. This was when Ma realized that the Internet had something great to offer. In April 1995, Ma, along with his business partner He Yibing, a computer instructor, opened his second company, Hangzhou Hope Computer Services (杭州海博网络公司). One of China's earliest Internet start-ups, the company ran a website, China Pages (中国黄页), as an online yellow page service. On 10 May 1995, the pair registered the domain chinapages.com in the United States. Within a span of three years, China Pages cleared approximately 5,000,000 RMB in profit which at the time was equivalent to US$642,998 (approximately $1.18 million today).

Ma began building websites for Chinese companies with the help of friends in the United States. He said that "The day we got connected to the Web, I invited friends and TV people over to my house", and on a very slow dial-up connection, "we waited three and a half hours and got half a page", he recalled. "We drank, watched TV and played cards, waiting. But I was so proud. I proved the Internet existed".

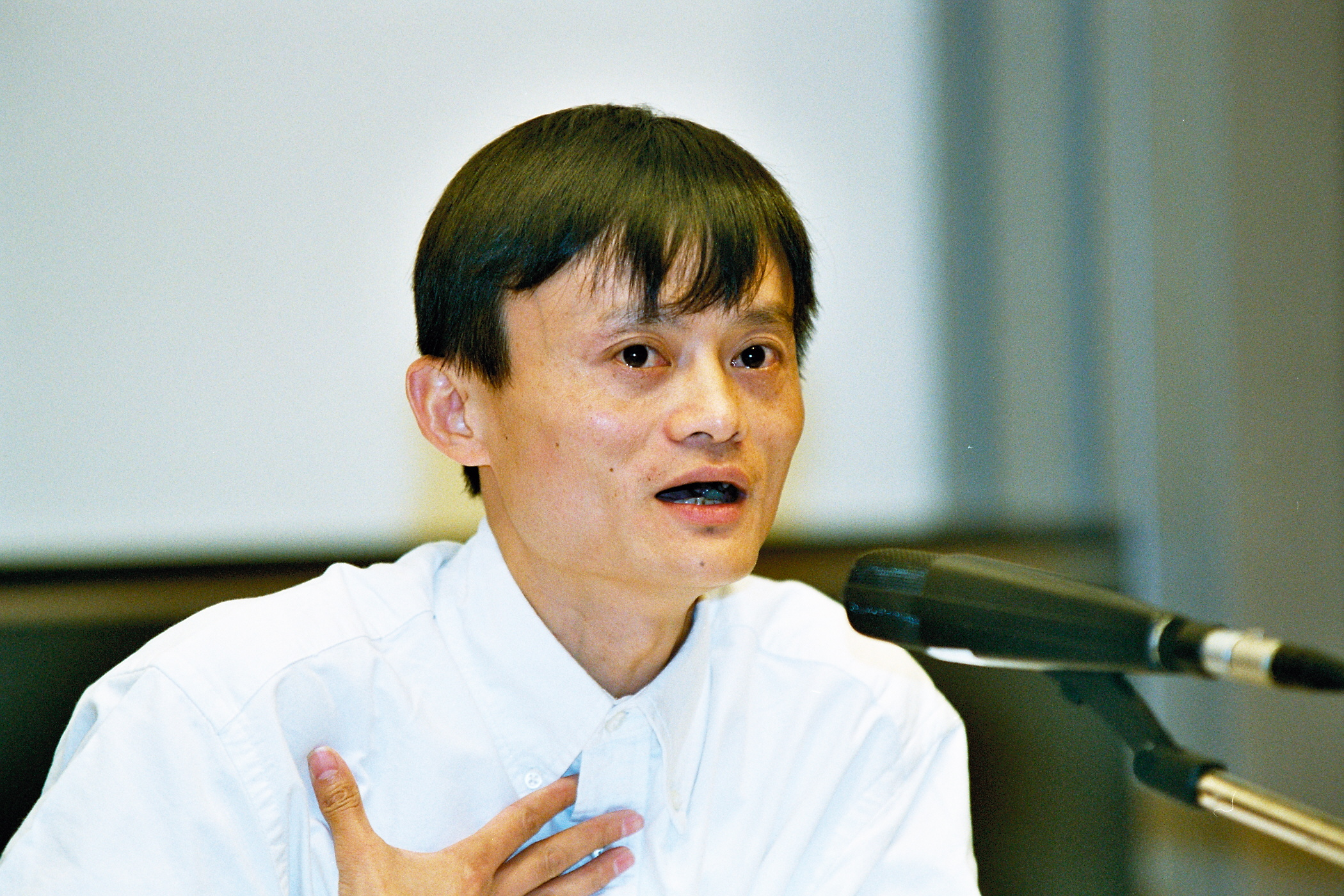
Jack Ma at the University of St. Gallen in 2001

From 1998 to 1999, Ma headed an information technology company established by the China International Electronic Commerce Center, a department of the Ministry of Foreign Trade and Economic Cooperation. In 1999, he quit and returned to Hangzhou with his team to establish Alibaba, a Hangzhou-based business-to-business marketplace site in his apartment with a group of 18 friends. He started a new round of venture development with 500,000 yuan.

In October 1999 and January 2000, Alibaba won a total of a $25 million foreign venture seed capital from the American investment bank, Goldman Sachs and the Japanese investment management conglomerate SoftBank. The program was expected to improve the domestic Chinese e-commerce market and perfect an e-commerce platform for online Chinese enterprises to establish a presence for themselves to compete, especially fostering the growth of Chinese small and medium-sized enterprises (SMEs) as well as addressing challenges surrounding China's entrance into the World Trade Organization in 2001. Eventually, Alibaba began to show signs of profitability three years later as Ma wanted to improve the global e-commerce system. Since 2003, Ma established Taobao Marketplace, Alipay, Ali Mama and Lynx. After the rapid rise of Taobao, American e-commerce giant eBay offered to purchase the company. However, Ma rejected their offer, instead garnering support from Yahoo co-founder Jerry Yang who offered a $1 billion investment in upfront capital for the potential purpose of expanding Alibaba's corporate operations.

=== Chairman of Alibaba Group ===
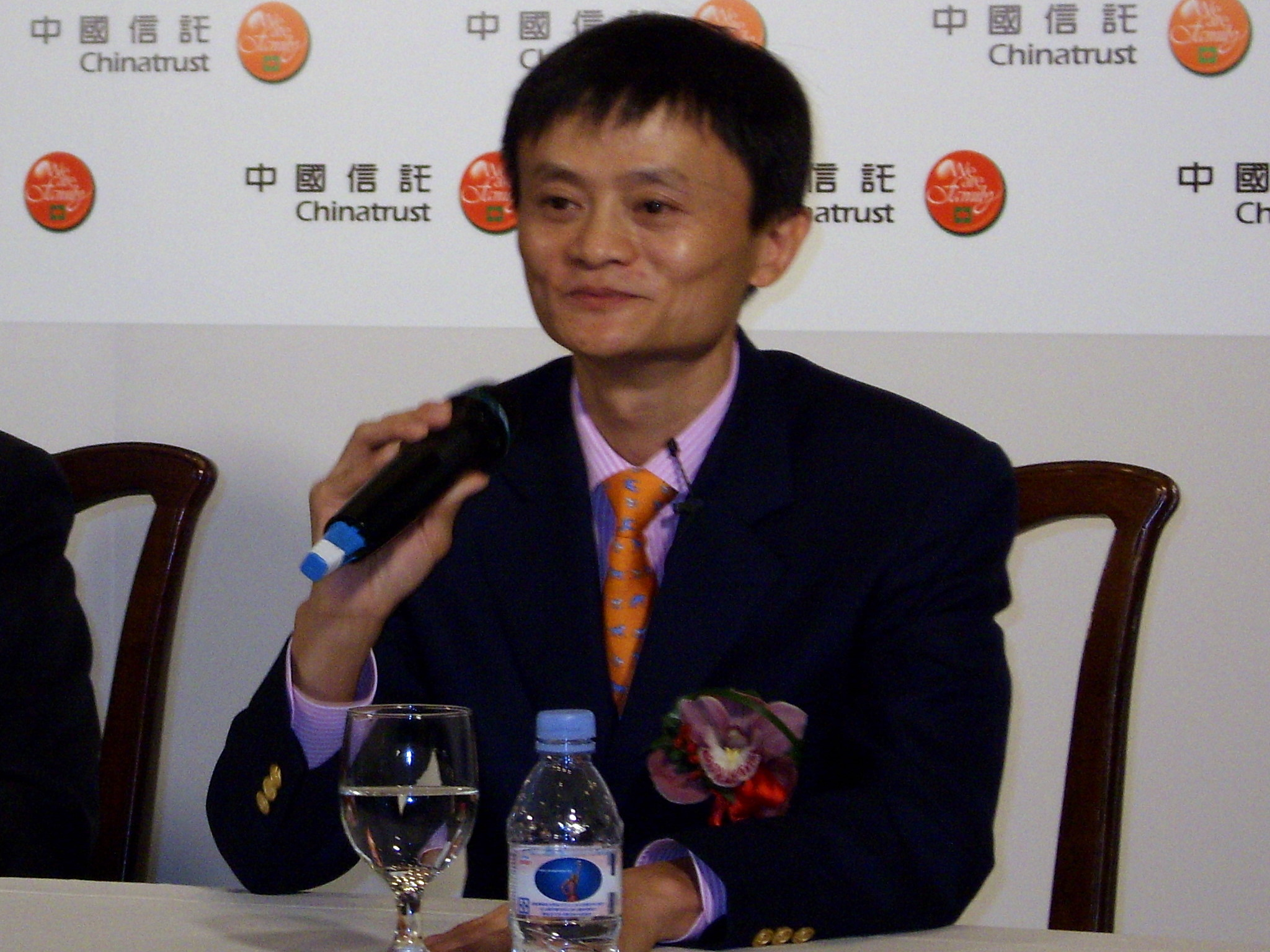
Ma speaking at the 2007 China Trust Global Leaders Forum

From 1999, Ma was executive chairman of Alibaba Group, which has remained one of China's most prominent high-technology holding companies in the two decades since it inception. It has nine major subsidiaries: Alibaba.com, Taobao Marketplace, Tmall, eTao, Alibaba Cloud Computing, Juhuasuan, 1688.com, AliExpress.com, and Alipay. At the annual general meeting of shareholders for Alibaba.com in May 2010, Ma announced Alibaba Group would begin in 2010 to earmark 0.3% of annual revenue to environmental protection, particularly on water- and air-quality improvement projects. Of the future of Alibaba, he has said, "our challenge is to help more people to make healthy money, 'sustainable money', money that is not only good for themselves but also good for the society. That's the transformation we are aiming to make." In line with that objective and long-term strategic reasoning, Jack Ma in July 2017, appointed Kuo Zhang as the President of Alibaba.com. His responsibilities include representing Alibaba.com on global trade, small-business growth, tariffs, artificial intelligence, and cross-border commerce.Recent media coverage indicates that Kuo Zhang is advocating for Alibaba.com's continued support of small and medium-sized businesses in regions like the US and Europe. In news reports, he explains how AI tools like Accio Work can simplify product discovery, supplier selection, and cross-border transactions.He explains how these technologies could be ways to reduce barriers for smaller firms while also promoting growth.

Despite achieving massive entrepreneurial and investment success in the Chinese high-technology industry and the fact that Alibaba is a high-technology company, Ma was never a technical expert on computer technology nor did he possess the extensive breadth of executive managerial skills and background experience or depth of technical know-how that would have nonetheless otherwise qualified him to competently run a technology company or operate as an independent technology entrepreneur on his own. Despite no technical background and being an English teacher, Jack Ma was able to build his first website as a chinese translation service in 1995. Because he did not have coding skills and traditional management experience, his strategy was to hire technical specialists who could fill that gap. Ma publicly stated in 2019: "I know nothing about technology, I know nothing about marketing." He was able to convince specialists to join him, including Joseph Tsai as CFO. Despite many failures and rejections Ma believed that the internet would transform global trade, and in 2014 Alibaba had a record-breaking IPO of $25 billion. Even though Ma's formal educational background and extensive training was in English rather than in a technical subject, his dearth of technical expertise did not deter him from being able to competitively distinguish himself from the average Chinese technology mogul. As Ma with his distinct profile stands out among his entrepreneurial contemporaries throughout the Chinese high-technology industry, many of whom typically have a foundational background in computer engineering and science as part of their formal academic training and educational makeup. Instead, Ma parlayed his educational background to use in an entrepreneurial context by fashioning himself as a promoter, businessman, manager, administrator, and organizer who possessed the soft skills, emotional capacity, and personality with a knack for leading and employing specialists of expert ability from every conceivable technical domain. At a press conference in 2010, Ma made clear with regards to the lack of his technical expertise by revealing to the public that he had never written a line of computer code, nor had ever made one sale to a customer, and that he only acquired a personal computer to do business with for the first time at the age of 33.

In 2011, it was announced that one of his companies had gained control of Alipay, formerly a subsidiary of Alibaba Group, so as to "comply with Chinese law governing payment companies in order to secure a license to continue operating Alipay. Numerous analysts reported that Ma sold Alipay to himself below market value without notifying the board of Alibaba Group or the other major owners Yahoo and Softbank, while Ma stated that Alibaba Group's board of directors were aware of the transaction. The ownership dispute was resolved by Alibaba Group, Yahoo! and Softbank in July 2011. In November 2012, Alibaba's online transaction volume exceeded one trillion yuan. Ma stepped down as the chief executive officer of Alibaba on 10 May 2013, but remained as the executive chairman of the corporation. In September 2014, it was reported that Alibaba was raising over $25 billion in an initial public offering (IPO) on the New York Stock Exchange. As of 2016, Ma is the owner of Château de Sours in Bordeaux, Chateau Guerry in Côtes de Bourg and Château Perenne in Blaye, Côtes de Bordeaux.

Ma speaking on the future of online trade and globalization at the World Economic Forum in 2017

On 9 January 2017, Ma met with United States president-elect Donald Trump at Trump Tower, to discuss the potential of 1 million job openings in the following five years through the expansion of the presence of Alibaba's business interests in the United States. On 8 September 2017, to celebrate Alibaba's 18th year of its establishment, Ma appeared on stage and gave a Michael Jackson-inspired performance. He also performed a partial rendition of Elton John's 1994 hit single Can You Feel the Love Tonight while being dressed up as a lead heavy metal singer at a 2009 Alibaba birthday event. In the same month, Ma also partnered with Hong Kong business tycoon, Sir Li Ka-shing in a joint venture to offer a digital wallet service in Hong Kong.

Ma announced on 10 September 2018, that he would step down as executive chairman of Alibaba Group Holding in the coming year. Ma denied reports that he was forced to step aside by the Chinese government and stated that he wants to focus on philanthropy through his foundation. Daniel Zhang would then lead Alibaba as the current executive chairman. Ma stepped down from the board of Alibaba on 1 October 2020.

=== During tech crackdown ===
News outlets noted a lack of public appearances from Ma between October 2020 and January 2021, coinciding with a regulatory crackdown on his businesses. The Financial Times reported that the disappearance may have been connected to a speech given at the annual People's Bank of China financial markets forum, in which Ma criticized China's regulators and banks. Ma described state banks as operating with a pawn shop mentality and criticized the Basel Committee on Banking Supervision as a "club for the elderly." Wired magazine suggests that Ma may have chosen to lay low during the stalled IPO period, influenced not only by government pressure but also by investors and employees within Alibaba who had lost millions due to the stalled IPO.

On 3 November 2020, the Shanghai Stock Exchange halted Ant Group's IPO. According to Chinese bankers and officials, financial stability was the objective behind the intervention. Their scrutiny had extended beyond Ant Group to other major players in China’s technology sector, particularly the three dominant companies collectively known as BAT - Baidu, Alibaba, and Tencent. These three companies have faced allegations of leveraging their substantial market power to establish monopolistic positions, using their scale to suppress competition and hinder the growth of smaller rivals. Ant Group had sought to maintain a position as a technology company, although it was deriving approximately 90% of its revenue from financial services. This position brought it into conflict with the People's Bank of China (PBOC), which since 2018 had sought to regulate Ant Group as a financial holding company. After Ant Group filed for its IPO, PBOC had issued draft guidelines stating that it would regulate companies such as Ant Group as financial services companies, not tech companies. During the IPO, financial regulators became even more concerned about Ant Group due to its high valuation as a tech company, increasing fears of a bubble.

Ma made a public appearance again on 20 January 2021, speaking via video link to a group of rural teachers at a charitable event, the annual Rural Teacher Initiative. In May 2021, Ma resigned from the presidency of Hupan University, which was founded by him in 2015. In 2022, Ma moved to Tokyo, Japan, largely retreating from the public life. From May 1, 2023 to October 31, 2024, Ma has been an invited professor at Tokyo College, a research institute at the University of Tokyo. His research focus was on sustainable agriculture and food production. In March 2023, photos and videos of Ma touring the Yungu school in Hangzhou, China appeared on social media confirming the public appearance of the billionaire for the first time in several months. The school is funded by Alibaba and is located near the company's headquarters. He was reportedly persuaded to return from abroad by premier Li Qiang. In the same month, Alibaba Group turned into a holding company and its subsidiaries separated into six independent firms; The Wall Street Journal reported on 30 March that Ma engineered this in talks with company CEO Daniel Zhang while he was traveling overseas.

Ant Group made major changes to its ownership structure and corporate governance in January 2023. That month, Ant Group announced a series of changes in shareholder voting rights, with Ma no longer the actual controller of Ant Group. Ma's voting rights were reduced from 50% to 6%. Following these changes, no single shareholder has a controlling stake in the company. The company's board also added another independent director. The Chinese government spoke positively of Ant Group's changes, including describing them as improvements in transparency and accountability. In early 2024, Ma replaced SoftBank as Alibaba's largest shareholder. On 17 February 2025, Ma attended a symposium with Chinese industry leaders, hosted by Xi Jinping at the Great Hall of the People in Beijing. While his image appeared on Xinwen Lianbo, his name was omitted by Xinhua News Agency and other state-run media, leading to mixed interpretations of his reappearance as a potential sign of rehabilitation following China's tech crackdown.

== Entertainment career ==
In 2017, Ma made his acting debut with his first kung fu short film Gong Shou Dao, directed by Wen Zhang and produced by Jet Li. The film stars Ma, Li, Donnie Yen, Wu Jing, Tony Jaa, Jacky Heung, Asashōryū Akinori, Zou Shiming, and Natasha Liu Bordizzo. It was filmed in collaboration with the Double 11 Shopping Carnival Singles' Day. In the same year, he also participated in a singing festival and performed dances during Alibaba's 18th-anniversary party. In November 2020, in the finale of Africa’s Business Heroes, Ma was replaced as a judge in the television show, with Alibaba executive Peng Lei taking his place, reportedly "Due to a schedule conflict".

== Awards and honours ==
- In 2004, Ma was honoured as one of the "Top 10 Economic Personalities of the Year" by China Central Television (CCTV).
- In September 2005, the World Economic Forum selected Ma as a "Young Global Leader".
- Fortune also selected him as one of the "25 Most Powerful Businesspeople in Asia" in 2005.
- Businessweek also selected him as a "Businessperson of the Year" in 2007.
- In 2008, Barron's featured him as one of the 30 "World's Best CEOs"
- In May 2009, Time magazine listed Ma as one of the world's 100 most powerful people. In reporting Ma's accomplishments, Adi Ignatius, former Time senior editor and editor-in-chief of the Harvard Business Review, noted that "the Chinese Internet entrepreneur is soft-spoken and elf-like—and he speaks really good English" and remarked that "Taobao.com, Mr. Ma's consumer-auction website, conquered eBay in China." He was also included in this list in 2014.
- BusinessWeek chose him as one of China's Most Powerful People.
- Forbes China also selected him as one of the Top 10 Most Respected Entrepreneurs in China by in 2009. Ma received the 2009 CCTV Economic Person of the Year: Business Leaders of the Decade Award.
- In 2010, Ma was selected by Forbes Asia as one of Asia's Heroes of Philanthropy for his contribution to disaster relief and poverty.
- Ma was awarded an honorary doctoral degree by the Hong Kong University of Science and Technology in November 2013.
- Ma was a board member of Japan's SoftBank (2007–2020) and China's Huayi Brothers Media Corporation. He became a trustee of The Nature Conservancy's China program in 2009 and joined its global board of directors in April 2010.
- In 2013, he became chairman of the board for The Nature Conservancy's China Program; this was one day after he stepped down from Alibaba as company CEO.
- In 2014, he was ranked as the 30th-most-powerful person in the world in an annual ranking published by Forbes.
- In 2015, Asian Award honoured him with the Entrepreneur of the Year award. Ma was awarded an honorary doctorate in education from National Taiwan Normal University.
- In 2016, he was awarded the Chevalier of the French Legion of Honour by French Minister of Foreign Affairs and International Development Laurent Fabius.
- In 2017, Fortune ranked Ma second on its World's 50 Greatest Leaders list.
- In 2017, a KPMG survey ranked Ma third in global tech innovation visionary survey.
- In October 2017, Ma was given an honorary degree of Doctor of Science in Technopreneurship from De La Salle University Manila, Philippines.
- In May 2018, Ma was given an honorary degree of Doctor of Social Sciences by the University of Hong Kong in recognition of his contributions to technology, society and the world.
- In May 2018, Ma received an honorary doctorate from professors Yaakov Frenkel and Yaron Oz at the Tel Aviv University.
- In May 2019, Ma and other 16 influential global figures were appointed by Secretary-General of the United Nations as the new advocates for sustainable development goals.
- In July 2020, Ma received from King Abdullah II a first class medal for his contribution in fighting back against the COVID-19 pandemic.
- In August 2020, Ma was to receive from the President of Pakistan a Hilal e Quaid e Azam medal for his contribution in fighting back against the COVID-19 pandemic.
- At the 2023 World Chinese Culture Festival (Tokyo), Kong Jian, Chairman of the World Confucius Association, Guo Shaocheng, Chairman of the World Chinese Alliance, and Mr. Fanghe Yuanjian, Chairman of the World Confucius Foundation, jointly announced that Ma won the [2023 Confucius Education Award] and congratulated the University of Tokyo on hiring Ma.

== Views ==
Ma is an adherent of both Buddhism and Taoism.

On 24 September 2014, in an interview with Taobao, Ma attributed the strength of American society to the country being rooted in its "Christian cultural heritage" and expressed his belief in the importance for China to implement a positive value system in order to overcome the aftermath and legacy of the bygone Cultural Revolution. In November 2018, the People's Daily identified Ma as a member of the Chinese Communist Party (CCP), something which surprised observers.

Ma received international criticism after he publicly endorsed the Chinese work practice known as the 996 working hour system. When asked in 2019 to give his views on the future, Ma again stated that 996 was currently a "huge blessing" necessary to achieve success, but went on to state that artificial intelligence technology might lead to a better life of leisure in the future, where people would only have to work four-hour work days, three days a week. In 2019, Jack Ma and Elon Musk debated, taking opposing views on AI and its potential risks and rewards. Jack Ma took a more positive approach and believed that machine learning could be a force for good, delivering fresh insights into how people think. He predicted that it would create more jobs, and that people might even reduce their workweek and people would be able to live to 120 years. In December 2024, Jack Ma expressed confidence in AI regarding its affiliate Ant Group and saw many opportunities for AI and fintech. Jack Ma described the present as an AI technological revolution, according to a Chinese media outlet. At the same time, Ma expressed skepticism that AI could ever completely replace people, referencing to his theory that success requires a "love quotient" and stating that machines can never match this success. Ma also predicted that population collapse would become a big problem in the future.

In 2017, Ma advocated for the use of big data and AI as a means to implement elements of a planned economy, stating that this technology would eliminate the information gaps that limited planned economic models historically. At the 2019 World AI Conference, Ma expressed his optimism for the future of AI, stating that AI had the potential to transform society positively and that leaders should "reshape themselves for AI". According to Ma, "Most of the projections about AI are wrong... people who are street-smart about AI are not scared by it."

== Philanthropy ==
Ma is the founder of the Jack Ma Foundation, a philanthropic organization focused on improving education, the environment and public health.

In 2008, Alibaba donated $808,000 to victims of the Sichuan earthquake. In 2009 Ma became a trustee of The Nature Conservancy's China program, and in 2010 he joined the global Board of Directors of the organization. In 2015, Alibaba launched a nonprofit organization, Alibaba Hong Kong Young Entrepreneurs Foundation, which supports Hong Kong entrepreneurs to help them grow their businesses. In the same year, the company funded the rebuilding of 1,000 houses damaged by the earthquake-hit in Nepal, and raised money for another 9,000. In 2015 he also founded the Hupan School, a business school.

In September 2018, Ma started the Jack Ma Foundation and announced that he would retire from Alibaba to pursue educational work, philanthropy, and environmental causes. In 2019, Forbes named Ma in its list of "Asia's 2019 Heroes of Philanthropy" and awarded him the Malcolm S. Forbes Lifetime Achievement Award for his work supporting underprivileged communities in China, Africa, Australia, and the Middle East. In 2020, in response to the COVID-19 pandemic, the Alibaba Foundation and Jack Ma Foundation launched various initiatives, some of which involved donating medical supplies to the United States as well as various countries in Asia, Africa, and Europe.

In May 2025, Time Magazine chose Jack Ma as one of its Time100 Philanthropy honorees for his contributions through his foundation, during COVID-19, and for his rural teacher initiative. He is also dedicated to climate preservation, and as a previous chairman of China's Natural Conservancy Council, he has on many occasions explained how making money in ways that do not harm the planet is important. In 2021, Alibaba pledged to become carbon neutral in its operations by 2030. In 2024, Alibaba Group and its B2B e-commerce site also pledged to reduce packaging materials using AI and pushed for reusing practices to increase conservation.

Non-profit organization positions
New title	President of the General Association of Zhejiang Entrepreneurs; 2015–2022	Succeeded by Nan Cunhui
