= He Had It Coming (TV series) =

Australian television series

- Genre: Black comedy; Mystery
- Written by: Gretel Vella; Craig Anderson; Emme Hoy; Belinda King; Nick Coyle; Hannah Samuel
- Directed by: Rachel House; Anne Renton
- Starring: Lydia West; Natasha Liu Bordizzo; Liv Hewson
- Original language: English

Production
- Executive producers: Chloe Rickard; Shay Spencer; Bridget Callow-Wright; Robert Taylor; Ellie Gibbons; Caliah Scobie; Alicia Brown; Gretel Vella
- Production company: Jungle Entertainment

Original release
- Network: Stan
- Release: 20 November 2025

He Had it Coming is an Australian black comedy mystery television series, starring Lydia West, Natasha Liu Bordizzo, and Liv Hewson. Produced by Jungle Entertainment, the series premiered on November 20, 2025 on Stan. It was later released in the UK by the BBC on 8 August 2026.

At the 2026 Screen Music Awards, music by Caitlin Yeo was nominated for Best Music for a Television Comedy.

== Premise ==
A drunken prank unexpectedly lands a feminist duo in the middle of a murder mystery.

== Cast and characters ==
=== Main ===
- Lydia West as Elise
- Natasha Liu Bordizzo as Barbara
- Liv Hewson as Officer Ivy Shepherd

=== Supporting ===
- Duncan Fellows as Detective Roach
- Roxie Mohebbi as Prue
- Lisa Kay as Vice Chancellor
- Audley Anderson as Blaide
- Tom Dawson as Rory
- Alex Champion de Crespigny as Jared
- Iolanthe as Debbie
- Mabel Li as Jenny
- Miah Madden as Jess

== Production ==
The series is created and written by Gretel Vella and Craig Anderson, with writers Emme Hoy, Belinda King, Nick Coyle, and Hannah Samuel. It is directed by Rachel House and Anne Renton. Jungle Entertainment is the producer, and Vella, Chloe Rickard, Shay Spencer, Bridget Callow-Wright, Robert Taylor, and Ellie Gibbons are executive producers. The executive producers for Stan are Caliah Scobie and Alicia Brown. The series also had production investment from Screen Australia and post, digital, and visual effects were supported by Screen NSW. The production was completed by February 2025.

The cast is led by Lydia West, Natasha Liu Bordizzo, and Liv Hewson, and also includes Duncan Fellows, Roxie Mohebbi, Tom Dawson, Alex Champion de Crespigny, and Miah Madden.

== Episodes ==
No.	Title	Directed by	Written by	Original release date
1	"This Is NOT What a Feminist Looks Like"	Rachel House	Craig Anderson, Bridget Harvey & Gretel Vella	November 20, 2025
2	"Little Miss P.I."	Rachel House	Craig Anderson, Bridget Harvey & Gretel Vella	November 20, 2025
3	"The Witch Hunt"	Rachel House	Craig Anderson, Bridget Harvey & Gretel Vella	November 20, 2025
4	"Clit Pong"	Rachel House	Bridget Harvey & Emme Hoy	November 20, 2025
5	"In the Kay-ge"	Anne Renton	Bridget Harvey & Hannah Samuel	November 20, 2025
6	"Cops and Tarts"	Anne Renton	Bridget Harvey & Belinda King	November 20, 2025
7	"Self-Care"	Anne Renton	Nick Coyle & Bridget Harvey	November 20, 2025
8	"The Captain's Luncheon"	Anne Renton	Craig Anderson, Nick Coyle & Bridget Harvey	November 20, 2025

== See also ==
- List of Stan original programming
