= Good Luck to You, Leo Grande =

2022 film by Sophie Hyde

- UK theatrical release poster
- Directed by: Sophie Hyde
- Written by: Katy Brand
- Produced by: Debbie Gray; Adrian Politowski
- Starring: Emma Thompson; Daryl McCormack
- Cinematography: Bryan Mason
- Edited by: Bryan Mason
- Music by: Stephen Rennicks
- Production companies: Align; Genesius Pictures
- Distributed by: Lionsgate (United Kingdom); Searchlight Pictures; Hulu (United States)
- Release dates: 22 January 2022 (Sundance); 17 June 2022
- Running time: 97 minutes
- Countries: United Kingdom; United States
- Language: English
- Budget: $4 million
- Box office: $9.8 million

Good Luck to You, Leo Grande is a 2022 sex comedy drama film directed by Sophie Hyde and written by Katy Brand. The film stars Emma Thompson and Daryl McCormack. The story revolves around a middle-aged widow who seeks a young sex worker to help her experience pleasurable sex.

The film had its world premiere at the Sundance Film Festival on 22 January 2022. It was released on 17 June 2022 in cinemas in the United Kingdom by Lionsgate and digitally in the United States by Searchlight Pictures as a Hulu original film. The film was critically acclaimed with praise given to the film's performances, with both actors nominated at the British Academy Film Awards, while Thompson also received a nomination for the Golden Globe Award for Best Actress in a Motion Picture – Musical or Comedy.

== Plot ==
In a hotel room, 55-year-old Nancy Stokes welcomes a young male sex worker named Leo Grande. Anxious, she explains that she has never had an orgasm, and has vowed never again to fake one after the death of her husband two years earlier. Nancy is insecure about her body and age, and embarrassed at having hired Leo, who tries to put her at ease.

Leo expresses no shame about sex work, but he reveals that his mother believes him to be an oil rig worker. Nancy shares that she is disappointed in her adult children, adding that she is a retired religious education teacher. Her husband was her only sexual partner and found oral sex demeaning, and they never deviated from unfulfilling missionary sex with no foreplay for thirty-one years together.

Nancy recounts her most sensual experience: as a teenager on a family holiday in Greece, a hotel worker took an interest in her. Alone in the garden, he began kissing and fingering her before being interrupted, and she left the following day. Seeing Nancy aroused and relaxed by her own story, Leo kisses her and initiates some form of sex.

A week later, Nancy meets Leo in the same hotel room for a second session. She has prepared a bucket list of five sexual activities to experience for the first time, beginning with oral sex on him. Nancy remains business-like and tense, worsened by a phone call from her daughter, but Leo relaxes her later through dancing and a massage. Fearing that she sacrificed her youth and potential adventures for her family, she is overwhelmed after touching a shirtless Leo, who encourages her to embrace her own body.

Nancy talks about wanting to feel 16 again, and mentions her old teaching job. She remarks about how outrageous some of her girl pupils were and how she opposed their shortening hemlines, remarking that "some of the male teachers were like lambs to the slaughter". Leo thinks those men might have been in the wrong job and defends the girls' rights to wear what they choose. Nancy says maybe his generation need a war to use up their energy. Leo reveals he has a younger brother in the army, from whom he is estranged. When he suggests Nancy book more sessions, she accuses him of trying to make more money. He tells her about his other clients, explaining that he obtains genuine pleasure from seeing their pleasure. Nancy sees Leo becoming aroused as he describes his work, which in turn arouses her, and she finally performs fellatio on him.

Nancy books Leo for a third session in the same room. He performs oral sex on her, the second item on her list, which she enjoys, saying her body "is now a wonder" and "a pleasure playground", but does not bring her to orgasm. She admits to cyberstalking and uncovering Leo's real name, Connor. Upset that she hasn't respected his boundaries, Leo tells her not to book him again. Nancy suggests her looking him up is because she thought he was proud of his work and that they were getting to know one another. Leo asks how would she like it if he were to expose her as a client. Leo leaves but returns for his forgotten mobile phone and throws bedding about in his search. Nancy encourages him to tell his family about his work, even offering to speak to his mother. Leo reveals that his mother tells people he is dead and disowned him when he was fifteen. He restates that he believes Nancy wants the nice version of his life not the truth, and leaves once more.

Nancy books Leo for a fourth session, arranging to meet in the hotel's cafe where one of the waitresses, Becky, turns out to be one of Nancy's former pupils. Nancy thanks Leo for her newfound confidence and sexual awakening, and has discreetly recommended him to several friends. She admits her real name is Susan Robinson, and that he is the only true adventure she has ever had. Becky interrupts with a story about Susan shaming her and her friends for their short skirts, calling them "sluts".

Leo has revealed his job to his brother, reconnecting with him. He also explains that his mother disowned him after catching him and several friends having group sex; she no longer acknowledges his existence, even walking past him in the street. Susan apologises to Becky for her past judgmental behaviour, confessing her real relationship to Leo and recommending his services.

Susan and Leo enjoy a final session in their room, passionately engaging in all the remaining acts on Susan's list, but she is still yet to orgasm. While Leo looks for a sex toy, Susan watches him walk around naked and masturbates, giving herself her first orgasm. She thanks Leo, telling him this will be their final session, as she does not need him anymore. They part amicably. Alone, Susan appreciates her own naked body.

== Cast ==
- Emma Thompson as Nancy Stokes / Susan Robinson
- Daryl McCormack as Leo Grande / Connor
- Isabella Laughland as Becky
- Charlotte Ware as waitress 1
- Carina Lopes as waitress 2

== Production ==
=== Development and casting ===
In October 2020, it was announced that Emma Thompson would star in a film directed by Sophie Hyde from a screenplay by Katy Brand. The film is a joint project between Genesius Pictures and Cornerstone Films, with Debbie Gray and Adrian Politowski producing. Daryl McCormack joined the cast in February 2021.

Hyde said that she enjoyed working with Thompson, and the two of them worked collaboratively, with the resulting film a co-creation by both of them. "We discussed a lot, listened to each other's stories and ideas about the material."

=== Filming ===
Principal photography began on 8 March 2021 and concluded on 20 April 2021. Filming locations included London and Norwich.

McCormack and Thompson did not require an intimacy coordinator to orchestrate their sex scenes. Regarding her nude scene for the film, Thompson has commented that "[i]t's very challenging to be nude at 62".

== Release ==
Cornerstone Films handled international sales and sold the film to independent distributors. In October 2021, Lionsgate acquired UK distribution rights to the film.

The film premiered at the 2022 Sundance Film Festival, which at the last minute was changed to an online rather than in-person event because of an increase in cases of the Omicron variant during the COVID-19 pandemic in the United States, on 22 January. Following the premiere, Searchlight Pictures acquired U.S. distribution rights to the film for $7.5 million, planning to release it through the streaming service Hulu.

On 17 June 2022, the film was released in cinemas in the United Kingdom and on Hulu in the United States. The film was released in Australian cinemas on 18 August 2022 by Roadshow Films, with some preview screenings accompanied by a Q&A session with Hyde and cinematographer Bryan Mason in the preceding week, including in their hometown of Adelaide.

== Reception ==
=== Critical reception ===
On the review aggregator website Rotten Tomatoes, the film holds an approval rating of 93% based on 221 reviews, with an average rating of 7.8/10. The website's critics consensus reads, "Sexual awakening stories aren't in short supply, but Good Luck to You, Leo Grande proves you can still tell one with a refreshing – and very funny – spin." Metacritic, which uses a weighted average, assigned the film a score of 78 out of 100, based on 34 critics, indicating "generally favorable" reviews.

A review in The New York Times by Lisa Kennedy described the film as "a tart and tender probe into sex and intimacy, power dynamics and human connection." Describing the two lead actors, her review says, "Thompson is terrifically agile with the script's zingers and revelations. A relative newcomer, McCormack moves between wit, compassion and vulnerability with grace." In a review for RogerEbert.com, critic Sheila O'Malley praised the film, writing, "It's a relief to see a film so frank about sex, and so open to sex's complexities, especially when so much of current cinema is sexless to a disheartening degree. 'Leo Grande' cares about sex for older women, and not just sex, but the baggage associated with sex, and how that baggage robs us of joy and fulfillment. Also revelatory is the film's non-judgmental attitude towards sex work." Writing for the Los Angeles Times, critic Justin Chang wrote, "Good Luck to You, Leo Grande presents itself as a corrective, with an earnestness that verges on the Utopian; for all its low-key intimacy and emotional realism, this movie knows it's selling a fantasy of its own. But it's hard not to warm to that fantasy, or to embrace its still-rare vision of a woman learning to articulate and satisfy her most human impulses. It's good for Nancy. And for us." In a review for the progressive publication People's World, journalist Chauncey K. Robinson highlighted how the film seemingly destroyed the "mythos that women stop living for themselves after they reach a certain point in their lives."

=== Accolades ===
Award	Date of ceremony	Category	Recipient(s)	Result	Ref.
Hollywood Critics Association Midseason Film Awards	1 July 2022	Best Actress	Emma Thompson	Nominated	
British Independent Film Awards	4 December 2022	Best British Independent Film	Sophie Hyde, Katy Brand, Debbie Gray, Adrian Politowski	Nominated	
British Independent Film Awards	4 December 2022	Best Director	Sophie Hyde	Nominated	
British Independent Film Awards	4 December 2022	Best Joint Lead Performance	Daryl McCormack and Emma Thompson	Nominated	
British Independent Film Awards	4 December 2022	Best Screenplay	Katy Brand	Nominated	
St. Louis Gateway Film Critics Association	18 December 2022	Best Actress	Emma Thompson	Nominated	
Alliance of Women Film Journalists	5 January 2023	Best Actress	Emma Thompson	Nominated	
Alliance of Women Film Journalists	5 January 2023	Most Daring Performance	Emma Thompson	Won	
San Francisco Bay Area Film Critics Circle	9 January 2023	Best Actress	Emma Thompson	Nominated	
Golden Globe Awards	10 January 2023	Best Actress in a Motion Picture – Musical or Comedy	Emma Thompson	Nominated	
London Film Critics' Circle	5 February 2023	British/Irish Actor of the Year (for body of work)	Emma Thompson	Nominated	
London Film Critics' Circle	5 February 2023	Breakthrough British/Irish Filmmaker of the Year	Katy Brand	Nominated	
Black Reel Awards	6 February 2023	Outstanding Breakthrough Performance, Male	Daryl McCormack	Nominated	
Satellite Awards	11 February 2023	Best Actress in a Motion Picture – Comedy or Musical	Emma Thompson	Nominated	
Houston Film Critics Society	18 February 2023	Best Actress	Emma Thompson	Nominated	
British Academy Film Awards	19 February 2023	Best Actor in a Leading Role	Daryl McCormick	Nominated	
British Academy Film Awards	19 February 2023	Best Actress in a Leading Role	Emma Thompson	Nominated	
British Academy Film Awards	19 February 2023	Outstanding British Film	Sophie Hyde, Debbie Gray, Adrian Politowski, Katy Brand	Nominated	
British Academy Film Awards	19 February 2023	Outstanding Debut by a British Writer, Director or Producer	Katy Brand	Nominated	
Irish Film & Television Awards	7 May 2023	Actor – Film	Daryl McCormack	Nominated	
Irish Film & Television Awards	7 May 2023	Original Music	Stephen Rennicks	Nominated	
