= Natasha Liu Bordizzo =

Australian actress

- Bordizzo in 2024
- Born: 25 August 1994 (age 32); Sydney, New South Wales, Australia
- Education: University of Technology Sydney
- Occupation: Actress
- Years active: 2015–present

Natasha Liu Bordizzo (born 25 August 1994) is an Australian actress. She made her movie debut portraying the character of Snow Vase in Netflix's 2016 wuxia film Crouching Tiger, Hidden Dragon: Sword of Destiny. In 2019, she portrayed the character of Helena in Netflix's The Society. In 2021, she played Julia in Amazon Prime's erotic thriller The Voyeurs, and in 2022, she portrayed the character of Heather in Netflix's Day Shift. In 2023, she portrayed the Mandalorian warrior Sabine Wren in the Disney+ series Ahsoka.

== Early life and education ==
Natasha Liu Bordizzo was born in Sydney, New South Wales. Her mother is Chinese and her father is of Italian descent. She attended Sydney Girls High School. She was preparing to study for a Bachelor of Law/Bachelor of Communication at University of Technology Sydney when she was cast for a leading role in Crouching Tiger, Hidden Dragon: Sword of Destiny (2016). Bordizzo speculated she was cast due to her age, appearance, English fluency, and martial arts ability—she has a black belt in taekwondo, as well as training in Kenpō karate.

== Career ==
To prepare for Crouching Tiger, Hidden Dragon: Sword of Destiny, Bordizzo underwent intensive training in Wudang sword fighting with Yuen Woo-ping.

In 2016, Bordizzo moved to Los Angeles to pursue an international acting career.

In 2017, Bordizzo had the supporting role of Deng Yan in The Greatest Showman, an American musical film, directed by Michael Gracey. The film premiered on 8 December, aboard the RMS Queen Mary 2. It was released in the United States on 20 December by 20th Century Fox and became one of the highest grossing live-action musicals of all time.

Bordizzo has also appeared in Hotel Mumbai (2018), an American-Australian thriller film directed by Anthony Maras and written by John Collee and Maras. It is based on the 2009 documentary Surviving Mumbai about the Mumbai attacks in 2008 at the Taj Mahal Palace Hotel in India. Bordizzo portrayed Australian back-packer Bree, opposite Dev Patel, Armie Hammer, Nazanin Boniadi and Anupam Kher.

In 2021, Bordizzo starred as Julia in the Amazon Prime Video movie The Voyeurs. The film was shot in Montreal, Canada in 2019 and tells the story of a couple who witnesses the sex life of their neighbours. Bordizzo originally auditioned for the role on a video call using an American accent but the director requested she keep her native Australian accent. In the same year, Bordizzo lent her voice to the animated comedy movie Wish Dragon as the voice of Li Na Wang. Her character is a celebrity who inspires a young boy's journey to be reunited with her because they were once childhood friends.

The following year, she appeared in Netflix's vampire action-comedy Day Shift.

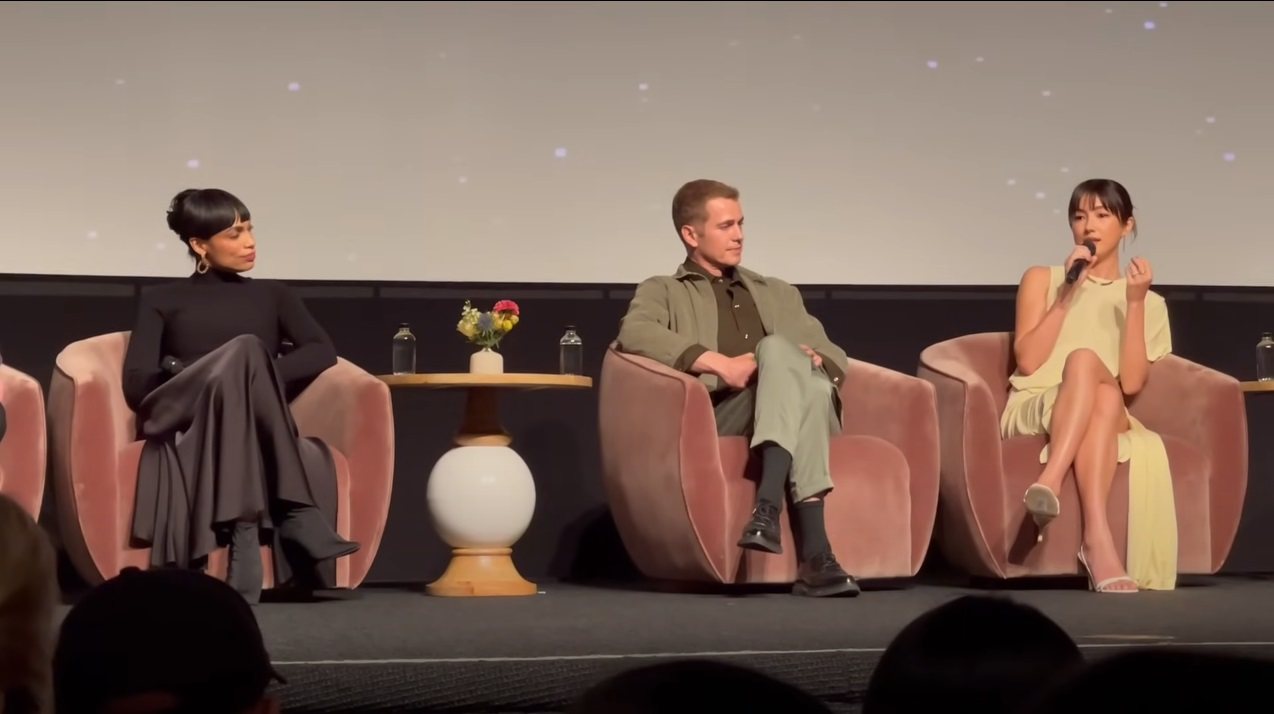
At an Ahsoka panel in 2024

In November 2021, it was reported that Bordizzo had been cast as Sabine Wren in the Star Wars series Ahsoka, which premiered in August 2023.

Bordizzo stars in the 2025 Stan Originals television series He Had It Coming, described as a genre-bending mix of campus politics, dark humor, and female friendship.

Bordizzo is a Chanel ambassador and modelled for Australian brand Bonds.

== Filmography ==
=== Film ===
Year	Title	Role	Notes	Ref.
2016	Crouching Tiger, Hidden Dragon: Sword of Destiny	Snow Vase		
2017	Gong Shou Dao	Master Yu	Short film	
2017	The Greatest Showman	Deng Yan		
2018	Detective Chinatown 2	Officer Chen Ying		
2018	Hotel Mumbai	Bree		
2019	Guns Akimbo	Nova Alexander		
2019	The Naked Wanderer	Valerie		
2021	The Voyeurs	Julia		
2021	Wish Dragon	Li Na	Voice role	
2022	Day Shift	Heather		
2023	Heroes of the Golden Mask	Li	Voice role	

=== Television ===
Year	Title	Role	Notes	Ref.
2019	The Society	Helena	Main role	
2020	Most Dangerous Game	Kennedy	3 episodes	
2023–present	Star Wars: Ahsoka	Sabine Wren	Main role	
2025	Mythic Quest	Tracy Liwanag	1 episode	
2025	He Had It Coming	Barbara	8 episodes	
