= Charles Abomeli =

British actor

- Born: Islington, London, England
- Occupation: Actor

Charles Abomeli is a British actor. He is known for playing Colonel Oduya in the third series of British science fiction drama Torchwood: Children of Earth.

== Career ==
A Shakespearean actor, Abomeli has played Coriolanus, Othello, Hotspur in Henry IV, and Angelo, for the National Theatre in their touring production of Measure for Measure in 2002.

For the Royal Shakespeare Company, he has appeared in Greg Doran's production of Othello in 2004 and the premiere stage adaptation of Malorie Blackman's Noughts & Crosses series in 2008.

At the West Yorkshire Playhouse he played Orsino opposite Hattie Morahan's critically acclaimed portrayal of Viola in Twelfth Night and prior to that, appeared in Who’s Boss? by Ansell Broderick.

Abomeli also played opposite Susannah York in one of her last theatre appearances, playing in Sara Mason's The Kindness of Strangers at The Croydon Warehouse.

Abomeli's screen roles have also included appearances in The Bill, The Jack in the Box, Wire in the Blood and ShakespeaRe-Told: Macbeth, with film roles in Anxiety and the award-winning short film Hypnotized by Marcia Green. In 2017, he played Joe Jackson in Man in the Mirror, a docudrama about Michael Jackson.
