= The Jack in the Box =

- Directed by: Lawrence Fowler
- Written by: Lawrence Fowler
- Produced by: Geoff Fowler; Lawrence Fowler
- Starring: Ethan Taylor; Robert Strange; Lucy-Jane Quinlan; Philip Ridout; Tom Carter
- Cinematography: Cameron Bryson
- Edited by: Lawrence Fowler
- Music by: Christoph Allerstorfer
- Production company: Fowler Media Limited
- Release dates: 9 November 2019 (British Horror Film Festival); 17 February 2020 (UK)
- Running time: 87 minutes
- Country: United Kingdom
- Language: English

The Jack in the Box is a 2019 British horror film directed by Lawrence Fowler, starring Ethan Taylor, Robert Strange, Lucy-Jane Quinlan, Philip Ridout and Tom Carter.

== Plot ==
A man discovers a buried antique box and takes it home. A demonic creature emerges from it and kills his wife.

Years later, Casey, an American grieving the death of his girlfriend, moves to a British town and begins working at an antiques museum. There he discovers an old Jack-in-the-box among items kept in storage. When he activates it, he unknowingly releases a demonic clown.

Soon afterward, two thieves break into the museum and are killed by the creature. Other people also begin disappearing around the museum. After learning from an antiques expert that some Jack-in-the-boxes were believed to contain demons, Casey suspects that the object is responsible. His colleague Lisa initially dismisses his claims, believing that his grief and insomnia are causing hallucinations.

Casey tracks down the box's former owner, who had been convicted of murdering his wife. The man tells him that the demon was responsible for her death. Casey later consults a demonologist named Maurice, who explains that the creature can be imprisoned again inside the box, but warns that the ritual will fail if any part of the demon remains outside it.

Casey returns to the museum after realizing that Lisa is in danger. The demon kills the museum owner, Rachel, before Casey fights it and forces it back into the box. However, one of its claws is severed and remains outside, causing the ritual to fail. Police arrive and arrest Casey for the murders, while Lisa attempts to dispose of the box by burying it. During his interrogation, Casey notices the missing claw in a crime-scene photograph and realizes the demon has not been contained. The creature then escapes from the box and kills Lisa.

== Cast ==
- Ethan Taylor as Casey Reynolds
- Robert Strange as Jack
- Lucy-Jane Quinlan as Lisa Cartwright
- Philip Ridout as Norman Cleaver
- Tom Carter as Maurice Ainsworth
- Darrie Gardner as Rachel Thompson
- Charles Abomeli as David Onyilogwu
- Simon Balfour as Detective Martin
- Vinnie Clarke as Aaron Bishop
- Stacey Lynn Crowe as Gwenn Parkinson

== Reception ==
Phil Wheat of Nerdly called the film "creepy and actually scary" and praised the "superb" production design and the score.

Michael Gingold of Rue Morgue wrote that while the film is "competently made at every level" and "deserves credit for not copping out at its conclusion, which leaves you with the kind of chill that’s too absent in what has come before", it "misses its chance to make a memorable mark on either the killer-clown or deadly-toy subgenres."

Jacob Walker of Starburst rated the film 5 stars out of 10 and wrote that while Fowler "does a decent job here, trying to develop his titular villain and make the most out of the budget and locations he has to work with", the film "sags in the middle and starts to get a little trying as the scenarios and locations fail to change."

== Sequels ==
The Jack in the Box was followed by two sequels: The Jack in the Box: Awakening, and The Jack in the Box Rises.
