= Jack-in-the-Box (short story) =

"Jack-in-the-box"
- Short story by Ray Bradbury
- Country: United States
- Language: English
- Genre: Fantasy

Publication
- Published in: Dark Carnival; Avon Fantasy Reader
- Publication type: Collection and magazine
- Media type: Print
- Publication date: 1947

"Jack-in-the-Box" is a fantasy short story by American author Ray Bradbury, first published as part of the 1947 short story collection Dark Carnival. It was later collected in the magazine Avon Fantasy Reader and the anthologies Interplanet7: Fantascienza, The Small Assassin, Ghostly and Ghastly, The October Country, and The Stories of Ray Bradbury.

== Plot summary ==
Living apart from the outside world, Edwin shares residence with his mother in a vast secluded mansion. She raises him to be god, telling him that his father, the original god, was killed by beasts from outside the estate, and that if he ever extricates himself he too will die. The beautiful estate they share is described as a complete fantasy world created by Mother and embellished by Edwin. It was all he ever knew and thus he lacked any reason to question his mother's version.

Over the course of the story, Edwin explores his universe and the various secrets and mysteries it holds. Among them is a woman other than Mother who serves as his "teacher", who is actually his mother in disguise. No matter which rooms of his Universe he visits, Edwin uses their windows as portals to glimpse the world beyond. He is unsuccessful in this task until he discovers the door open to a forbidden room. Upon entry, he climbs the spiral staircase to the tower, and looks out the windows.

In an experience reminiscent of the Biblical Saul, Edwin finally views the world beyond the Universe. He even fears blindness because of what he sees. In the end, soon after a joyful birthday party, Edwin discovers his collapsed mother motionless on the parlor floor. Unable to awaken her, Edwin finally leaves the only home he has ever known, symbolically "dying" and joyfully entering the outside world.

== Reception ==
This story is viewed as a psychological gambit or classic psychoanalytic struggle, invoking as Bradbury's fiction often does, Lacanian three orders of Imaginary, Symbolic and Real. It pits the protagonist and his being locked into the natural order of things — will he join his mother's domain, ascend to her adjoining throne and accept her rules and assumptions — against his journey to find an external world. Attachment theory is insinuated into the story.

== See also ==
- Dogtooth
- The Truman Show
