= Barnaby Thompson =

British film director and producer

- Born: Barnaby David Waterhouse Thompson; 29 March 1961 (age 65)
- Education: University of Oxford
- Occupations: Film director and producer
- Relatives: John Thompson (father)

Barnaby David Waterhouse Thompson (born 29 March 1961) is a British film director and producer. He is best known for producing Wayne's World, Spice World, Kevin & Perry Go Large and An Ideal Husband, as well as co-directing the St Trinians films. He founded Fragile Films and ran Ealing Studios for fourteen years.

== Early life and education ==
Thompson was born in London to parents who both worked in radio. He went to St. Paul's School and graduated from Oxford University with a degree in theology and philosophy.

== Career ==
Thompson began his career in documentary filmmaking, including the 1990 short film Dear Rosie which received Academy Award and BAFTA nominations. In the early 1990s, he joined Lorne Michaels at Broadway Video in New York, where he co-produced several major American comedies, including Wayne’s World, Coneheads, and Tommy Boy.

Upon returning to the United Kingdom, Thompson co-founded Fragile Films with Uri Fruchtmann in 1996 and produced the global commercial success Spice World. His subsequent work included adaptations such as the BAFTA-nominated An Ideal Husband and Kevin & Perry Go Large.

In 2000, he led a consortium to purchase the historic Ealing Studios, serving as its Head of Studios for 14 years and overseeing its modernization. During this tenure, he co-directed the rebooted St Trinian’s franchise, which became one of the highest-grossing independent British film series. His more recent credits include directing the 2020 feature Pixie as well as the 2024 documentary Mad About the Boy: The Noel Coward Story.

== Personal life ==
Thompson has been married to American writer Christina Robert since 1991. They have two children.

== Selected Filmography ==
Title	Year	Producer	Associate Producer	Co-Producer	Executive Producer	Director	Writer
Witness in the War Zone	1987	No	Yes	No	No	No	No
Dear Rosie	1991	Yes	No	No	No	No	No
Wayne's World	1992	No	Yes	No	No	No	No
Wayne's World 2	1993	No	No	Yes	No	No	No
Coneheads	1993	No	No	Yes	No	No	No
Lassie	1994	No	No	Yes	No	No	No
Tommy Boy	1995	No	No	Yes	No	No	No
Kids in the Hall: Brain Candy	1996	No	No	Yes	No	No	No
Spice World	1997	Yes	No	No	No	No	No
An Ideal Husband	1999	Yes	No	No	No	No	No
Kevin & Perry Go Large	2000	No	No	No	Yes	No	No
Lucky Break	2001	Yes	No	No	No	No	No
High Heels and Low Lifes	2001	Yes	No	No	No	No	No
The Importance of Being Earnest	2002	Yes	No	No	No	No	No
Hope Springs	2003	Yes	No	No	No	No	No
Imagine Me & You	2005	Yes	No	No	No	No	No
Valiant	2005	No	No	No	Yes	No	No
Fade to Black	2006	Yes	No	No	No	No	No
Alien Autopsy	2006	Yes	No	No	No	No	No
St Trinian's	2007	Yes	No	No	No	Yes	No
I Want Candy	2007	Yes	No	No	No	No	No
Easy Virtue	2008	Yes	No	No	No	No	No
St Trinian's 2: The Legend of Fritton's Gold	2009	Yes	No	No	No	Yes	No
From Time to Time	2009	No	No	No	Yes	No	No
Dorian Gray	2009	Yes	No	No	No	No	No
Burke & Hare	2010	Yes	No	No	No	No	No
Bad Bromance	2015	Yes	No	No	No	No	No
Kids in Love	2016	Yes	No	No	No	No	No
Nina	2016	Yes	No	No	No	No	No
Fisherman's Friends	2019	No	No	No	Yes	No	No
Pixie	2020	Yes	No	No	No	Yes	No
Mad About the Boy: The Noel Coward Story	2024	Yes	No	No	No	Yes	Yes
