= Amazon China =

Chinese shopping website

- Website type: Online shopping
- Available in: Chinese
- Owner: Amazon (2004–present)
- Website: www.amazon.cn
- Commercial: Yes
- Launched: 1999; 27 years ago
- Current status: active

Amazon China (Chinese: 亚马逊中国), formerly known as Joyo.com (Chinese: 卓越网), is an online shopping website. Joyo.com was founded in early 2000 by the Chinese entrepreneur Lei Jun in Beijing, China. The company primarily sold books and other media goods, shipping to customers nationwide. Joyo.com was renamed to “Amazon China” when sold to Amazon Inc in 2004 for US$75 Million. Amazon China closed its domestic business in China in June 2019, offering only products from sellers located overseas.

== History ==
=== Origin ===
Joyo.com was founded by Lei Jun, Chinese entrepreneur and owner of Kingsoft, in May 2000. Kingsoft decided to make Joyo.com into an online bookstore in 1999. Joyo.com was originally a site offering programs for downloading onto desktop computers. It later became an online bookstore and was the second online retailer of books in China after DangDang. They continued to expand their inventory and was in 2003 considered to be one of the largest online retailers of media goods worldwide. Lenovo Group Ltd and Kingsoft Corp were shareholders of Joyo.com until Tiger Technology Management LLC entered the corporation by investing $52 million for about 20% of Joyo, making it the third largest stakeholder. Joyo.com primarily merchandised goods such as books, music and videos to consumer nationwide.

In 2004 Joyo.com was acquired by the American multinational technology company Amazon.com Inc. The company was rebranded and renamed in October 2011 to Amazon China. Amazon made many changes to Joyo, like redesigning the website by adding categories and self-service features, as well as implementing new payment methods. Amazon also changed the webpage URL to http://z.cn, but continued to be hosted at www.amazon.cn. Amazon China sold foreign fashion brands, home interior, toys, personal care and technology to their Chinese customers. Amazon was planning on establishing operations in Shanghai's free trade zone.

=== Acquisition ===
Amazon.com Inc. acquired Joyo.com in August 2004 and was bought for approximately US$75 million, where about $72 million was paid in cash and $3 million in stock options. The acquisition deal also included control over other Chinese subsidiaries and partners owned by Joyo.com. Amazon.com Inc. was already present and operating in the US, Canada, France, Germany, Japan and the UK before they entered the Chinese market. At the time, Joyos headquarters were located in the British Virgin Islands. Amazon.com Inc.’s CEO, Jeff Bezos, expressed excitement over the acquisition, but recognized the challenges of entering the Chinese market. Though being fully owned by Amazon, Joyo.com kept its name and branding until 2007, the name Joyo Amazon replaced Joyo and the website Amazon.cn was launched. Joyo continued to operate partly independently from other sites owned by Amazon for a couple of years. It expanded the variety of products being sold, including technology, cosmetics and baby products.

== Sales revenues ==
Joyo.com was one of the largest online retailers before Amazon acquired the company and grew rapidly after it was launched. The sales revenues reached 56 million yuan in 2001 and 150 million yuan in 2003. According to the at the time president of Joyo.com, Lin Shuixin, Joyo generated in the second quarter of 2003 a 70% growth in revenues.

After the acquisition, Amazon China struggled to continue the growth and compete with local competitors. Due to changes in operation, salaries, customer service and technology by instructions from Amazon, Joyo lost US$13 after the acquisition according to ChinaByte. The New York Times wrote that Amazon China sold less in China than in Japan, which was Amazon's smallest market at the time. They were only responsible for about 6% of Amazon's business in total and therefore not large enough to be included in Amazon's annual reports. In 2013, Amazon China reported fiscal sales of US$74.4 billion, while their competitor, Alibaba, had sales for approximately US$420 billion in 2014.

== Competition ==
In the early 2000s, DangDang was considered the largest competitor to Joyo.com. They were especially similar, as they both focused on selling books as their main business and offered products large discounts on the same products. There was an increase in number of Chinese e-commerce business in the early 2000. These companies grew rapidly along with the rising popularity for online shopping, especially among younger consumers. The competition for consumers rose and Alibaba became the largest and most popular in China after a few years in the market.

Amazon.cn offered express delivery for the major Chinese cities, like Beijing, Shanghai and Guangzhou, but their competitors usually offered faster delivery to a cheaper price or free, regardless of city. Amazon.cn also had a minimum spend amount for their Chinese customers for all purchases on their website, which varied from 59 yuan to 200 yuan based on item. Amazon Inc. minimum spend policy also applies in other countries, but come with free national express delivery as well.

After the acquisition in 2004, were Amazons biggest competitors in China, Dangdang, Taobao, Pinduoduo, Alibaba, Tmall and JD.com. They are similar in terms of business model and variety of products being sold. In comparison to Alibaba and DangDang, did Amazon not have the same intense marketing approach as their competitors, that often had big sales promotions and campaigns during Chinese holidays.

=== Alibaba ===
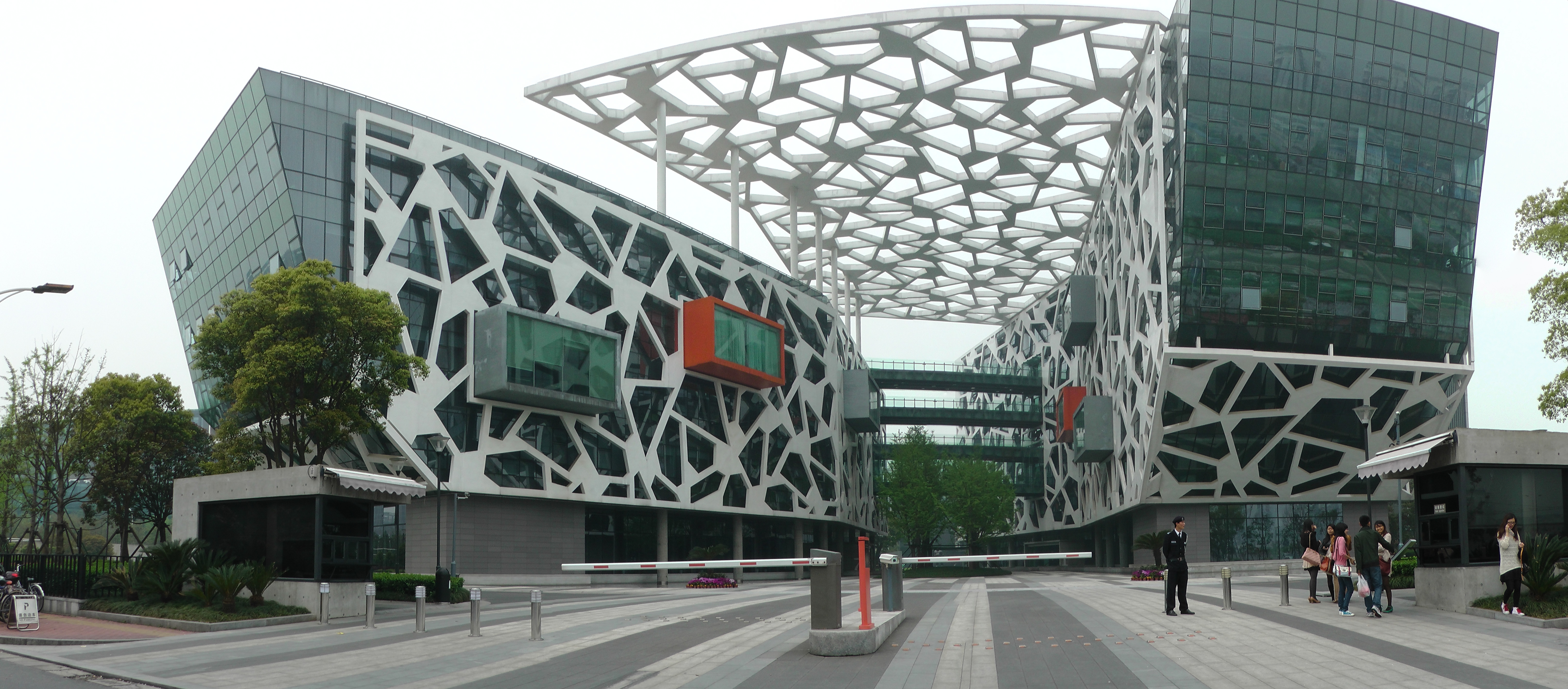
Picture of Alibaba's headquarters

Chinese e-commerce site Alibaba is today considered to be the largest e-commerce retailer in China based on yearly revenue sales. Alibaba has approximately 654 million users and has had a steeper growing rate than Amazon Alibaba was also established in 1999, by founder Jack Ma with a team of 17 friends in Hangzhou, China. Due to their similarities, is Alibaba often referred to as the "Chinese Amazon" despite being two separate companies with little connection to each other. Alibaba and Amazon are similar in products sold and popularity. The largest differences deal with their business model as Amazon sells own products, while Alibaba operates a platform that connects sellers and customers and do not own any inventory themselves. Alibaba has several subsidiaries and operates within numerous markets. They primarily focus on e-commerce, but also operate within the technological market. Alibaba has its own payment platform named Alipay, which is used both online and in stores worldwide.They have also developed a messaging app, Dingtalk, which is recognised as the world's largest professional communication app. In 2026, Alibaba was set to launch a new service that would provide AI agents to millions of merchants on the Taobao and Tmall platforms. The merchants will have the ability to use a digital workforce 24/7 that will provide a number of services, including distributing vouchers and adjusting product prices in real time. 1688, Alibaba's domestic arms also rolled out AI-powered tools, including AI digital employees that help with product listings, marketing activities, and market trend analysis that connects to Qwen LLMs and DeepSeeks open source models that will reduce operational cost. The Incommerce11 initiative marked Alibaba's first time that a large-scale deployment of AI took place across the entire e-commerce journey.

=== Termination ===
Amazon.com Inc. announced in 2019 that it would close down its business in China by 18 July 2019 to focus on cross-border selling to Chinese consumers. Amazon China faced tough competition as rivals like Alibaba started to gain more popularity. Amazon struggled for many years to gain traction and eventually stopped growing. According to Ker Zheng, a marketing specialist at Azoya, Amazon had little competitive advantage in China compared to the other countries they were operating in. Amazon faced tough competition from not only Alibaba but also other domestic e-commerce entities that are popular in China, including Tmall and JD.com. Shoppers, however, will still be able to order goods from the global store that appeared when customers tried to access the Amazon China site. It also continued to operate its cloud business in China. After 2019, Amazon shifted focus to Kindle and global seller support for Chinese exporters. Sellers who were interested in selling outside of China were still able to sell to buyers outside of the country. Amazon showed interest in investing in China when, in 2004, Amazon purchased a local online book site called Joyo.com. According to iResearch China, Amazon's market share was less than 1% when they decided to shut down as Amazon China. Amazon continues to offer limited services in China, like Amazon Prime, but without the on-demand video benefits. Customers can still enter the webpage amazon.cn, but can only access products imported from Amazon sites located overseas. This includes the US, UK, Germany or Japan. Vendors located in China however are still able to sell their products to consumers overseas and there are estimated about 200,000 Chinese sellers active on Amazon, selling to overseas buyers, especially in the US.

On 2 June 2022, Amazon announced that it would stop the operation of Kindle e-bookstore in China on 30 June 2023.
