= Wang Gang (computer scientist) =

Computer scientist and engineer

- Occupations: Electrical and Computer Engineer
- Known for: Artificial Intelligence, Autonomous Driving Technology
- Board member of: Institute of Electrical and Electronics Engineering (IEEE)

Academic background
- Education: Ph. D Electrical and Computer Engineering
- Alma mater: University of Illinois Urbana-Champaign; Harbin Institute of Technology

Academic work
- Discipline: Artificial Intelligence
- Sub-discipline: Autonomous Driving Technology
- Institutions: CenoBots (Cenozoic Robotics); Nanyang Technological University; Advanced Digital Science Center, Singapore; Alibaba Group
- Notable works: Recent advances in convolutional neural networks; Deep learning-based classification of hyperspectral data
- Notable ideas: Tmall Genie
- Website: https://www.cenobots.com/

Wang Gang, also known as Michael Wang, is an electrical and computer engineer and academic specializing in Artificial Intelligence and its application in autonomous driving. Wang has authored or co-authored more than 100 publications, cited over 28,000 times. His h-index is computed to be 72.

Wang is also an entrepreneur, former vice president at Alibaba Group group of Companies, and the founder and CEO of CenoBots (Cenozoic Robotics), a company that manufactures cleaning robots.

== Background ==
Michael Wang studied Engineering at the Harbin Institute of Technology. A recipient of the 2009-2010 Harriett & Robert Perry Fellowship, he completed Ph. D in Electrical and Computer Engineering at the University of Illinois Urbana - Champaign.

== Career ==
=== Academic career ===
Wang was a tenured associate professor at the School of Electrical and Electronic Engineering, Nanyang Technological University in Singapore. There he led a research team of approximately 20 people. From 2010 to 2014, he held a position as a research scientist at the Advanced Digital Science Center, Singapore.

Wang's research focuses are in the fields of Deep Learning, Machine Learning, Computer Vision, and Autonomous Driving. He has authored or co-authored 189 publications throughout his career. These publications have been cited a total of 28,886 times. His h-index is calculated to be 72, indicating that at least 72 of his papers have been cited at least 72 times each.

=== Alibaba and DAMO ===
Wang joined Alibaba in March 2017. He was the technical director for the development of Tmall Genie, Alibaba's voice-controlled smart speaker, as well as Xiaomanlv, an autonomous delivery robot. He was chief scientist of Alibaba AI Labs, later appointed vice-president of the company and head of the autonomous driving laboratory at DAMO (Discover, Adventure, Momentum and Outlook) Academy. During his time at Alibaba, Wang focused his work on the application of deep learning to computer vision and autonomous driving.

=== Other ventures ===
At the end of 2021, Wang resigned from Alibaba to found and raise funds for his own company CenoBots (Cenozoic Robotics), which develops intelligent cleaning robots.

=== Professional organisations and awards ===
Wang is a senior member of the Institute of Electrical and Electronics Engineers (IEEE), Associate Editor for IEEE Transactions on Pattern Analysis and Machine Intelligence (TPAMI) journal, Area Chair at the 2017 International Conference on Computer Vision (ICCV), and Area Chair at the 2018 IEEE Conference on Computer Vision and Pattern Recognition (CPVR).

He was named one of the 35 Innovators Under 35 2017 by MIT Technology Review, in both the Asia Pacific Region and the Global editions of the award.

== Selected publications ==
- Jiuxiang Gu, Zhenhua Wang, Jason Kuen, Lianyang Ma, Amir Shahroudy, Bing Shuai, Ting Liu, Xingxing Wang, Gang Wang, Jianfei Cai, Tsuhan Chen, (2018) Recent Advances in Convolutional Neural Networks, Pattern Recognition, vol. 77, May 2018, pp. 354–377
- Yushi Chen, Zhouhan Lin, Xing Zhao, Gang Wang, Yanfeng Gu, (2014) Deep Learning-based Classification of Hyperspectral Data, IEEE Journal of Selected Topics in Applied Earth Observations and Remote Sensing, vol. 7, Issue: 6, June 2014, pp. 2094–2107.
- Amir Shahroudy, Jun Liu, Tian-Tsong Ng, Gang Wang, (2016) Ntu rgb+ d: A Large Scale Dataset for 3D Human Activity Analysis, Proceedings of the IEEE Conference on Computer Vision and Pattern Recognition (CVPR), 2016, pp. 1010–1019.
- Jun Liu, Amir Shahroudy, Dong Xu, Gang Wang, (2016) Spatio-temporal lstm with trust gates for 3d human action recognition, European Conference on Computer Vision 2016, pp. 816–833.
- Rahul Rama Varior, Mrinal Haloi, Gang Wang, (2016) Gated Siamese Convolutional Neural Network Architecture for Human Re-identification, European Conference on Computer Vision 2016, pp 791–808.
- Jun Liu, Amir Shahroudy, Mauricio Perez, Gang Wang, Ling-Yu Duan, Alex C Kot, (2019) Ntu rgb+ d 120: A Large-scale Benchmark for 3D Human Activity Understanding, IEEE Transactions on Pattern Analysis and Machine Intelligence, vol. 42, Issue 10, pp. 2684–2701.
- Rahul Rama Varior, Bing Shuai, Jiwen Lu, Dong Xu, Gang Wang, (2016) A Siamese Long Short-term Memory Architecture for Human Re-identification, European Conference on Computer Vision 2016, pp 135–153.
