= Online supermarkets in China =

Online supermarkets in China are shopping websites that offer grocery buyers a complete shopping solution from a single online platform. The emphasis on these sites is to provide consumers all the products they would normally find on a supermarket shop floor but delivered directly to the house or office door. Customers pay for goods with popular online payment systems such as Alipay, or by bank transfer, or cash on delivery.

Some online grocers, such as Yihaodian (also known as The No 1 Store) and Dingdong Maicai deliver to customers directly from their distribution centers, other providers such as Auchan employ staff to pick goods from store shelves which are then delivered to customers.

== Main competitors ==
As of June 2011, there was only one online supermarket which is fully national across China: Yihaodian. All other online supermarkets only operate in Shanghai. In a China a consumer study published in May 2011 (DDMA Market Research) found that in Shanghai 89% of white collar online grocery shoppers had used Yihaodian recently, whereas only 39% had used Taobao Supermarket.

The same study by DDMA Market Research identified the main drivers of usage for online supermarkets in China as:

- Convenience of delivery (100%)
- Ease of searching for items (70%)
- Not having to deal with crowds (66%)
- Ability to read product reviews (60%)
- Wide selection of products (51%).

US retail giant Wal-Mart in May 2011 announced it was in talks to purchase a minority stake in Yihaodian for an undisclosed amount. Taobao Supermarket also has access to large amounts of investment capital through its parent Alibaba Group (40% owned by Yahoo). Taobao Supermarket has announced on its website that it plans to expand into Beijing, Shanghai, Guangzhou, and Hangzhou.

=== Online Consumer Purchases in China ===
10% of all consumer goods purchases in Shanghai are carried out online, according to another market research study by DDMA Market Research. This compares to 10.5% for the UK. On average across China the share is lower at 3%, but internet penetration is growing rapidly so this number is expected to increase. A recent study shows that in China, online shopping benefits rural residents statistically by enhancing their living standards.

As of March 2023, China's online retail sector is experiencing intensified competition, affecting market share and growth among leading e-commerce players. This competitive environment, noted by Fitch Ratings, is influencing companies to invest heavily in maintaining their market positions, potentially impacting their profit margins.
