= Yihaodian =

Chinese online grocery business

- Native name

Chinese name
- Simplified Chinese: 1号店
- Literal meaning: Shop No.1
Transcriptions
Standard Mandarin
- Hanyu Pinyin: yī hào diàn
- Type: Subsidiary
- Industry: Retail
- Founded: July 2008; 17 years ago
- Founders: Gang Yu; Junling Liu
- Owner: Walmart (2015–2016); JD.com (2016-present)

Yihaodian (Chinese: 1号店; pinyin: yī hào diàn; lit. 'Shop No.1') is a Chinese online grocery business founded by Gang Yu and Junling Liu in July 2008. Yihaodian is a business-to-consumer (B2C) e-commerce website that provides people with a platform to shop groceries online. Yihaodian has "virtual stores" that exhibit images of stocked grocery shelves on walls and other surfaces in urban public areas in China, which passersby can scan codes under the images with a mobile device to purchase corresponding groceries online. The retail giant Walmart first invested in Yihaodian in 2011; in 2012, it announced additional investment so that Walmart controlled 51% of Yihaodian's ownership. In July 2015, Walmart acquired 100% ownership of Yihaodian.

== History ==
The two founders, Gang Yu and Junling Liu were both former executives at Dell before they established Yihaodian.com. Gang Yu was the vice-president of Worldwide Procurement, while Junling Liu was the president of Dell China. Besides that, before joining Dell, Gang Yu had also acted as the vice-president of Global Supply Chain at Amazon, and Junling Liu had been the vice-president at Avaya China. Both of them accumulated rich experiences and management skills from their previous jobs. In 2007, Gang Yu and Junling Liu suddenly announced their resignation from Dell and began to prepare for their own business.

In 2008, e-commerce market in China was dominated by e-commerce companies like Alibaba.com, Taobao and Dangdang. They seized domains in e-commerce respectively: Alibaba for "business-to-business", Taobao for "consumer-to-consumer" and Dangdang for "business-to-consumer". Gang Yu and Junling Liu accurately analyzed the situation of e-commerce in China and they eventually decided to develop the business-to-consumer (B2C) market by introducing a specialized category, "commodity", to the marketplace. Consequently, Yihaodian.com was launched in July 2008.

== Merging ==
In May 2011, the retail giant Walmart first invested in Yihaodian, with aims to integrate its logistics to Yihaodian's supply chain. In 2012, Walmart announced its further investment to Yihaodian under the approval of Chinese Ministry of Commerce, which had led Walmart became the biggest shareholder of Yihaodian (51.3% of shares). In July 2015, Walmart announced full ownership of Yihaodian.

On June 20, 2016, Walmart announced that it was selling its stake in Yihaodian to JD.com in exchange for a 5% stake in JD.com shares. The deal was valued at $1.5 billion.
