= De facto non-merger =

A de facto non-merger occurs when a corporate transaction results in a merger, but when that merger was effectuated using non-merger methods such as asset acquisitions and redemptions. See Rauch v. RCA Corp., 861 F.2d 29 (2nd Cir. 1988).

A shareholder might claim that a transaction was a de facto non-merger to argue that certain non-merger provisions in the company's articles of incorporation should apply (such as special redemption rights), especially when those provisions might be more favorable to the shareholder than default statutory merger protection provisions (such as appraisal rights).

Statutory protections generally provided for in statutory mergers include (a) board initiation and approval; (b) shareholder approval; (c) appraisal remedies.

== See also ==
- De facto merger
