= Jonathan Lu =

Chinese businessman

- 陆兆禧

CEO of Alibaba Group
- In office March 11, 2013 – May 10, 2015
- Preceded by: Jack Ma
- Succeeded by: Daniel Zhang

Personal details
- Born: 1969 (age 56–57) Guangzhou
- Occupation: Businessperson

Jonathan Lu or Lu Zhaoxi (Chinese: 陆兆禧; pinyin: Lù Zhàoxǐ; born 1969) is an honorary partner of Alibaba Group. From 2013 to 2015, Lu served as Alibaba's CEO. He was succeeded by Daniel Zhang.

== Biography ==
=== Early life and education ===
When Lu was in highschool, he wanted to be an architect. However, according to his statements, he forgot to complete a page on his Gaokao Exam and ended up getting a degree in hotel management from Guangzhou University. After graduation, he worked as a receptionist at a Holiday Inn in Guangzhou.

=== Career ===
According to his public statements, before being tapped to become CEO, Lu worked at Alibaba for 13 years, including stints with the business-to-business division (alibaba.com), Taobao.com, and Yun OS.

In 2013, Jack Ma selected Lu as his successor as CEO. During his tenure as CEO, Lu oversaw Alibaba's $21.8 billion IPO. At the end of his tenure, Alibaba was doing well, beating market expectations, but there were rumors that Jack Ma, Alibaba's founder, no longer trusted Lu's ability to run the company.

In 2015, Lu was the first senior manager to be named an "Honorary Partner", effectively retiring. As of 2017, Lu has a net worth of 1.1 billion US dollars.
