= Qingchun Square =

Square in Hangzhou, China

Coordinates: 30°15′40″N 120°12′03″E

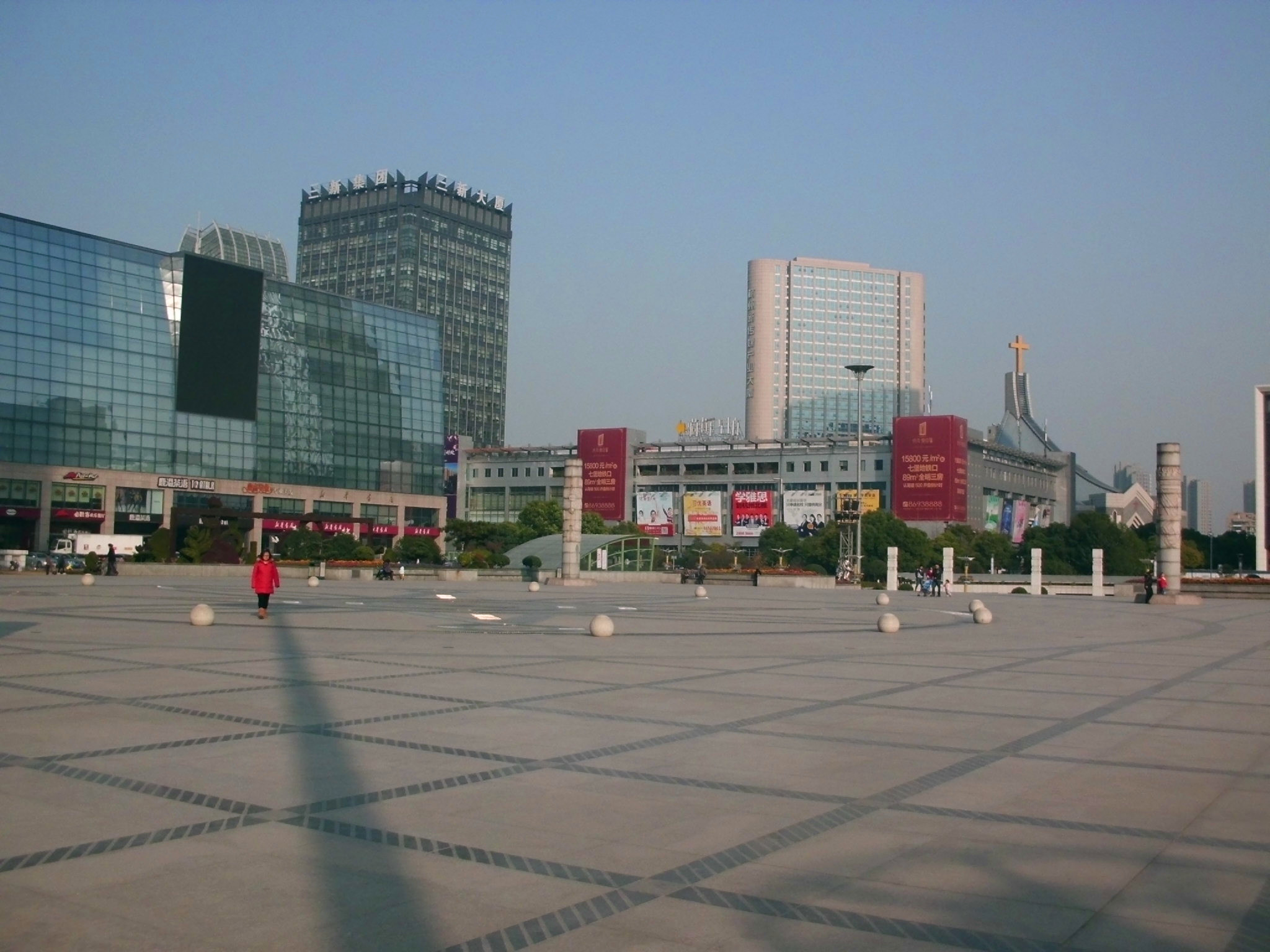

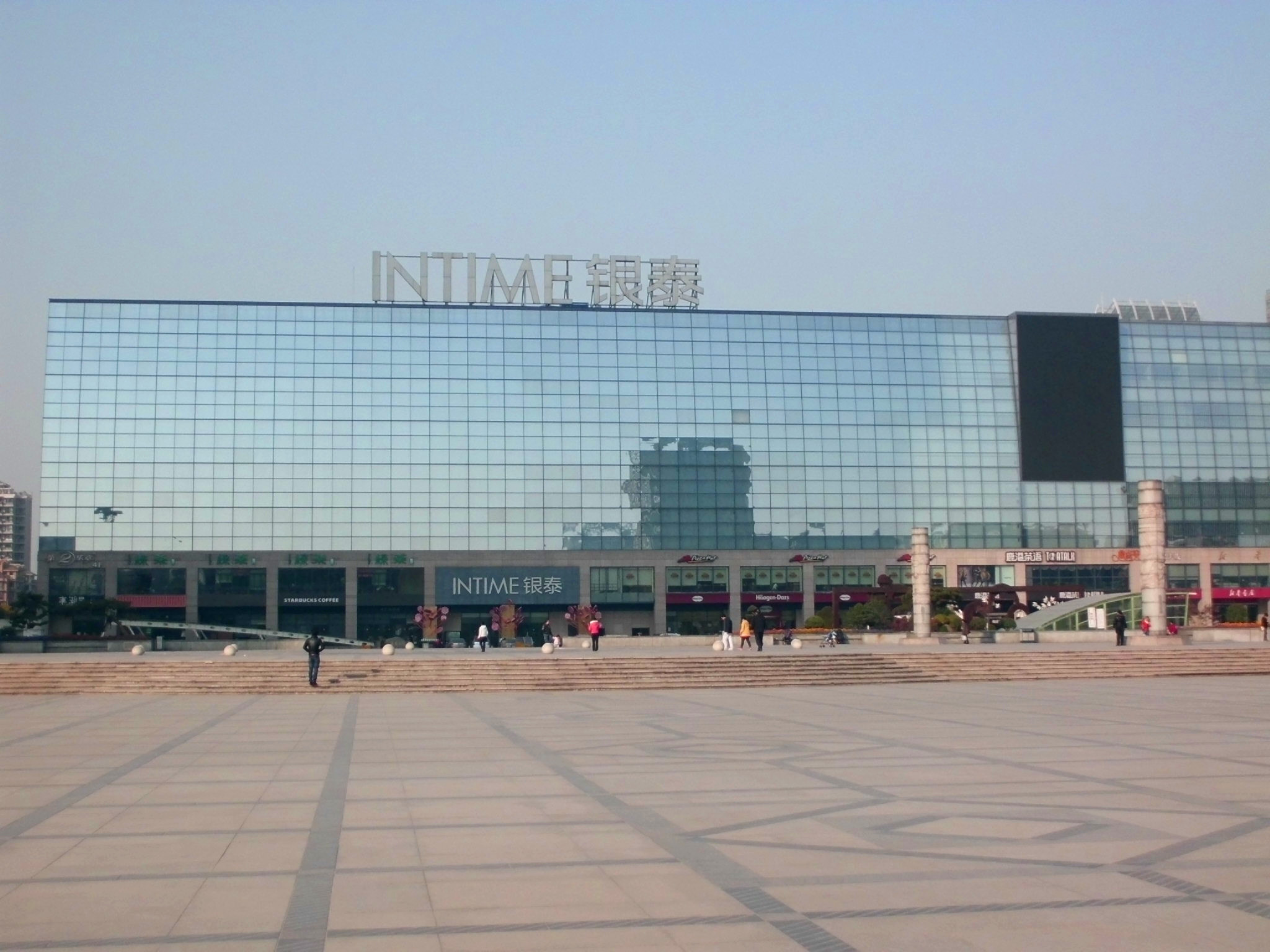

Qingchun Square (庆春广场) is a square located on the north side of Qingchun East Road in Shangcheng District, Hangzhou. It integrates leisure, shopping, culture and entertainment.

== Introduction ==
The total area of the square is 43,000 square meters, of which 16,500 square meters are green space and 13,392 square meters are paved.

The main buildings on the square are the Yintai Shopping Center in the north and a Tesco supermarket in the east. A Xinhua Bookstore is located on the 1st floor of Yintai, and Lumiere Cinema is located on the 6th floor of Yintai. Xizi International is located on the west side of the square.

The square is planning to build an underground shopping mall and a large parking lot in the future. Across the square road (on the south side of Qingchun East Road) is the Sir Run Run Shaw Hospital.

== Transportation ==
The Qingchun Square station of Hangzhou Metro Line 2 is located in the area, with four entrances. It opened in July 2017.

== Underground Development Project ==
The underground development project of Qingchun Square integrates square, commercial, cultural entertainment, business and other functions, with an area of 88,000 square meters. The planned construction period is from October 2015 to 2018, with a total investment of 1 billion yuan.

The first underground floor is on the same level as the subway station and will be developed into an underground commercial street. The second underground floor is on the same level as the subway station platform and is mainly a large supermarket and parking lot. The third underground floor is a large parking lot. After completion, it will connect to the underground parking lots of Xizi International and Qingchun Yintai to achieve resource sharing. There are 800 parking spaces on the second and third underground floors.
