= De facto merger =

Concept in statutory merger law

The de facto merger doctrine states that courts will look to substance over form when determining whether statutory merger law applies to a company's shareholders. Thus, where an asset acquisition leads to the same result as a statutory merger, these jurisdictions demand that shareholders are given the same rights as in the statutory merger. The doctrine was primarily established in Farris v. Glen Alden Corp., 143 A.2d 25 (Pa. 1958).

Since the establishment of the doctrine in Pennsylvania, many courts have adopted their own versions of the doctrine or rejected it. The de facto merger in application allows courts to declare the nature of a transaction stated as a sale-of-assets into a merger; therefore, all rights and liabilities attached to a statutory merger would be applied.

== Considerations ==
The three primary considerations to the doctrine are in reference to the corporation, shareholders and third parties involved.

Corporate law scholars argue against the ability of legislature to change transactions that add greater and unforeseen debts and obligations. This ability doesn’t allow for proper planning, certainty and predictability, of agreements to assure effective transactions.

Other scholars still argue in favor of the doctrine to protect shareholders. Statutory mergers give shareholders exit rights, such as appraisal rights. Frequently in a sale-of-assets, shareholders in a privately traded company may have no option but to sell shares to a new corporation that they do not support the merger with.

Liability of the successor corporation, in reference to third parties, is another consideration. In a sale-of-assets debt, present and possible, stay with the old corporation instead of transferring, even if the purchasing corporation continues similar business. "Third parties with a claim against the dissolving corporation lose the opportunity to bring suit if successor liability does not attach."

== Factors of differing application by courts ==
Most courts, particularly in Delaware, have rejected the de facto merger doctrine and refuse to imply merger-type protection in these cases. See Hariton v. Arco Electronics, Inc., 182 A.2d 22 (Del. Ch. 1962), aff'd, 188 A.2d 123 (Del. 1963) (relying on the independent legal significance doctrine).

Delaware will acknowledge a de facto merger "when a corporation misinterprets or misapplies the sale of assets statutes". See Orzeck v. Englehart, 195 A.2d 375, 378 (Del. 1963)

The states that do apply the doctrine typically, but not exclusively, have four primary tests to judge its usage. Some courts require only one factor, others require all, and others still have entirely different factors when deciding if a transaction is a de facto merger.

Factors:

(1) continuity of ownership [or continuity of shareholders]; (2) cessation of the ordinary business and dissolution of the predecessor as soon as practically and legally possible; (3) assumption by the successor of liabilities ordinarily necessary for uninterrupted continuation of the business of the predecessor; and (4) a continuity of [enterprise, including] management, personnel, physical location, aspects, and the general business operation.

== See also ==
- De facto non-merger

== Works cited ==
- Bentzen, Sheila A. (2013). "The De Facto Merger Doctrine Revisited" (PDF). Drake Law Review. 62: 91–127. ISSN 0012-5938.
