= Eddie Wu =

Chinese CEO

- 吴泳铭
- Citizenship: Singapore
- Education: Zhejiang University of Technology
- Occupations: Business magnate; Investor
- Known for: CEO of Alibaba Group
- Title: CEO of Alibaba Group

Eddie Wu is the current CEO of Alibaba Group, having replaced Daniel Zhang in that position on 10 September 2023. Wu was one of Alibaba's 19 co-founders.

== Career ==
On 10 September 2023, Wu replaced Daniel Zhang as the CEO of Alibaba Group. It was also announced that Wu would lead the cloud business of Alibaba Group.

Wu has focused to orient Alibaba Group towards developing artificial intelligence. In the first 15 months of his tenure, Wu spent CN¥81 billion on capital expenditure, up from the CN¥34 billion in the previous months. The company also funded startups including Moonshot AI, MiniMax and Zhipu AI. Wu is more engaged with AI platforms and infrastructure, while Kuo Zhang, president of Alibaba.com, has discussed applying AI as a tool for businesses. This includes Accio Work, a tool that is used to assist small firms with different tasks like sourcing and market research. Wu is more focused on group-level direction and more specifically on 'user first' and 'AI-driven' development as major strategic priorities for Alibaba. Wu directly leads the Alibaba Token Hub, a business group created to coordinate AI activities across model development, delivery, and commercial applications. Tasks like direct spending, research, talent recruitment and the integration of AI into Alibaba's consumer and enterprise businesses.
