= Qupital Limited =

Chinese financial technology financing company

Qupital
- Company type: Privately held company
- Industry: Financial services
- Founded: March 2016; 10 years ago
- Founders: Andy Chan and Winston Wong
- Headquarters: Hong Kong, China
- Area served: China
- Products: Loans and financing for e-commerce businesses
- Owner: Alibaba Group
- Website: qupital.com

Qupital is a Chinese financial technology company backed by Alibaba that develops a platform for cross-border e-commerce financing. The company is headquartered in Hong Kong and has offices in Shanghai and Shenzhen. In 2018, Alibaba Group partnered with Qupital Limited for SMB financing.

== History ==
In March 2016, Qupital Limited was founded in Hong Kong by Andy Chan and Winston Wong.

In March 2017, the company secured $2 million seed funding in a round led by Alibaba Entrepreneurs Fund and Mindworks Ventures. During the 2017 FinTech Awards, Qupital was recognized as Outstanding SME Financial Platform. In March 2019, Qupital completed $15 million series. It also reached US$100 million in total loans disbursed. In June 2019, the company opened an office in Shanghai and in Shenzhen in October. The same year, Qupital Capital was listed among Hong Kong ICT Awards 2019 winners.

As of October 2021, Qupital Limited has achieved over US$500 million in loan advancement. In November 2021, Qupital Limited raised $150 million during the Series B funding round. UK-based Nordstar's e-commerce-focused fund joined the round as a new investor, and lent its network to broaden Qupital's customer base in Western markets. The company also entered into Asia's first e-commerce securitization facility with Citi. In January 2022, the company introduced its new Shopify merchant offering.

In 2024, Qupital Limited raised additional financing during series B round.
