= Intime Department Store =

Chinese department store chain

- Native name: 银泰集团
- Romanized name: Yintai Group
- Company type: Subsidiary
- Industry: Retail
- Founded: 1998; 27 years ago in Hangzhou, China
- Headquarters: Beijing, China
- Number of employees: 7,530 (2025)
- Parent: Alibaba Group
- Website: intime.com.cn

Intime Department Store (sometimes transliterated as Yintai) is a chain of department stores with stores in Beijing, Zhejiang, Hubei, Sichuan, Shaanxi and Anhui. Founded in 1998, Yintai Department Store opened its first store in Hangzhou, headquartered in Beijing. It is owned by Yintai Commercial Group Co., Ltd. (Hong Kong Stock Exchange:1833.HK), and is part of Alibaba Group.

== History ==
- In March 2007, Yintai Department Store made a public offering in Hong Kong, with a fund of up to 2.43 billion Hong Kong dollars. China Life's fund and the Pandisson family, a major shareholder of Dickson, were also subscribed. Yintai Department Store also holds some shares of the 100 Group and Wuhan Wushang Group.
- In October 2010, Yintai Department Store acquired a 50% stake in Beijing Yansha Friendship from Hengji Property for 1.612 billion yuan, and the acquisition was completed in the form of shares. After the acquisition, Hengji Property held 7.74% of Yintai Department Store.
- On March 31, 2014, Alibaba Group invested in new shares and convertible bonds of Yintai Department Store, with a total investment of 5.37 billion Hong Kong dollars. According to the agreement, Yintai will issue 2205 million new shares to Alibaba at 7.5335 yuan per share, equivalent to 16.6% of the closing price of 9.13 yuan before the suspension, accounting for 9.9% of the issued share capital. In addition, the company will issue 3.706 billion yuan of convertible bonds to Alibaba. From now on, Alibaba can exchange 489.6 million new shares at a price of 7.9102 yuan at any time in the next three years. Alibaba holds up to 26.13% of Yintai shares.
- In July 2015, Shen Guojun, the former chairman of Yintai Commercial, reduced his holdings of Yintai Commercial and sold 18% of the shares to his family, Sun Tao and Tang Yue, and Shen Guojun's holdings of shares was reduced to 12%.
- On January 10, 2017, Alibaba Group, together with Shen Guojun, the founder of Yintai Department Store, proposed to privatize Yintai Commerce at HK$19 billion per share. After the completion of the acquisition, Alibaba will become the controlling shareholder of Yintai, and the shareholding is expected to increase to 73.73%.
- On March 30, 2018, Yintai Commercial spent 3.361 billion yuan to acquire 100% of Xi'an Kaiyuan Mall from Xi'an International Medical Investment Co., Ltd.
- On December 14, 2020, due to the acquisition of the equity of Yintai Commercial (Group) Co., Ltd. by Alibaba Investment Co., Ltd., which failed to declare the illegal implementation of the concentration of operators in accordance with the law, the State Administration of Market Supervision and Administration imposed 50 on Alibaba Investment Co., Ltd. in accordance with the Anti-monopoly Law of the People's Republic of China. Administrative penalty of 10,000 yuan fine.
- Investor Jenny Zeng's company Maple Valley gained fame by helping Intime Department Store raise US$90 million of private investment and later go public and attracted many other high-profile clients.
- In December 2024, Alibaba announced it would sell Intime Department Store to Youngor Group.
