= AliGenie =

China-based personal assistant

- Developer: Alibaba Group
- Release: October 12, 2017; 9 years ago
- Available in: Chinese
- Type: Intelligent personal assistant
- Website: aligenie.com (Chinese)

AliGenie is a China-based open-platform intelligent personal assistant launched and developed by Alibaba Group, currently used in the Tmall Genie smart speaker. The platform was introduced in 2017, along with the Tmall Genie X1, at Alibaba's 2017 Computing Conference in Hangzhou.

In 2019, Alibaba AI Labs announced that its smart assistant AliGenie, which was the voice of Tmall Genie speakers, would be integrated into more than 600 IoT platforms and would be found on nearly 200 million devices. In 2023, Tmall Genie announced that they will be launching smart glasses. The glasses will have a 5 megapixel camera, an intelligent voice assistant, and a bone-conduction audio system.

== Features ==
Similar to other virtual assistants, AliGenie is capable of smart home control, music playback, voice shopping, taking notes and more. AliGenie also features voice recognition, voiceprint recognition, semantic understanding and speech synthesis. AliGenie has been integrated with more than 660 Internet of Things platforms and used across 200 million devices, making it a device that can be used to manage multiple home devices if they are part of the same ecosystem. Within smart homes, the device can be used to adjust thermostats and control TVs, music, and set reminders for shopping tasks. Similar to the Echo, the AliGenie has similar hardware and is a small black disc with a downward-facing ring that lights up when it is activated. The device can also be used to order items from Tmall, Alibaba's shopping site. Similar to the Echo, the AliGenie has voice recognition so that only authorized users can send it commands.

AliGenie also integrates with Alibaba Group's services, such as online payment service Alipay and shopping platform Taobao and Tmall. AliGenie's technology, developed by Alibaba Group, was also used in the Tmall Genie X1, a device powered by the AliGenie voice assistant system that mirrors Amazon's Echo. With the AliGenie, users can ask for weather and news information and set reminders.It can also control home tasks such as climate control, smart TVs, and even drawing the curtains. It can also play movies and music, and can function as a personal assistant by setting reminders and responding to queries. AliGenie's voiceprint recognition technology offers security by only allowing authorized users to place online orders. Voice recognition enables the technology to be used for payments. The purchase is verified by requiring the user to enter a password, which is then sent to a mobile phone, providing a sort of two-stage verification. It can also reload prepaid accounts.

== Open platform ==
AliGenie is an open platform, allowing different manufactures to work on the system, and add it to third-party products.
