= Daniel Zhang =

Chinese business executive

- 张勇
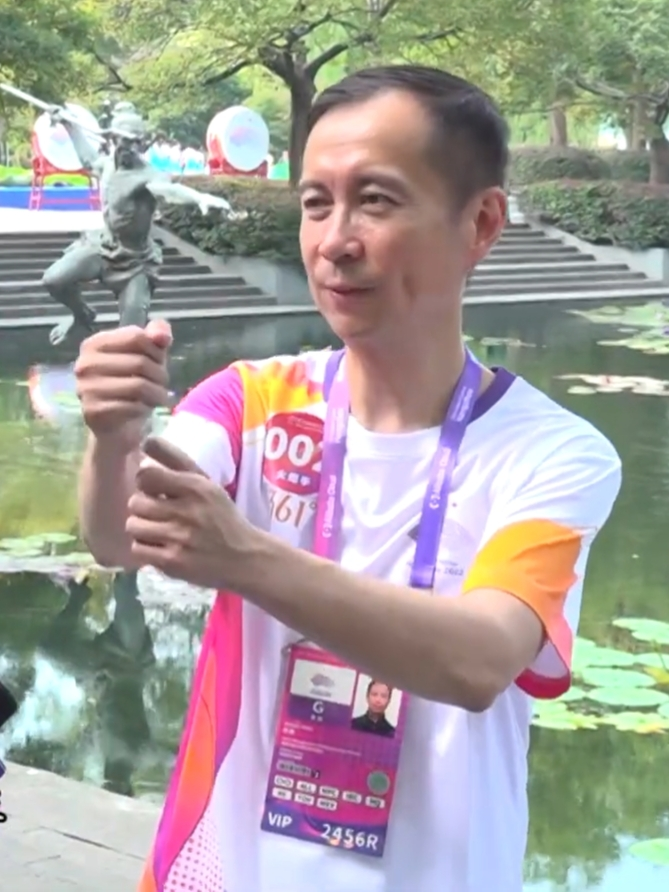
- Daniel Zhang in 2023
- Born: January 11, 1972 (age 54); Shanghai, China
- Education: Shanghai University of Finance and Economics
- Occupation: Business executive

Daniel Zhang Yong (simplified Chinese: 张勇; traditional Chinese: 張勇; pinyin: Zhāng Yǒng) is a Chinese business executive who was the executive chairman and chief executive officer of Alibaba Group. Before becoming Alibaba's chief, Zhang was best known for his roles as CEO of Taobao and president of Tmall (owned by Alibaba). While running Tmall, Zhang created the Singles' Day shopping holiday, an annual Chinese sales event with gross sales reaching four times higher than Black Friday and Cyber Monday combined.

In 2020, Zhang was included on Time's list of 100 most influential people in the world.

== Early life and education ==
Zhang was born in Shanghai in 1972. He studied finance at Shanghai University of Finance and Economics.

== Career ==
After graduation, he worked for Barings Bank, just before its bankruptcy due to trader Nick Leeson. 1995–2002, he worked for one of the former "Big Five" accounting firms Arthur Andersen which collapsed due to the Enron scandal. He then worked for PwC for two years starting in 2002.

Zhang first joined Taobao (an Alibaba subsidiary) in 2007 as its chief financial officer. The following year he became the chief operating officer of Taobao. In 2011, Zhang was promoted to president of Tmall, a business-to-consumer shopping spinoff from Taobao. It was during his time running Tmall that Zhang launched the Singles' Day shopping event. In 2009, the day that began in the 1990s as a celebration of singleness among university students in China was launched by Zhang as an e-commerce shopping event. By 2018, it had turned into a multibillion-dollar annual shopping day for Alibaba and other Chinese e-commerce companies. Zhang was the individual who launched the day to promote Alibaba's Tmall shopping platform. The day, celebrated on 11.11, November 11, is now a commercial day for all of China. In 2018, Alibaba brought in $30.8 billion in a twenty-four-hour period. The shopping event was preceded by a show featuring Cirque du Soleil and Mariah Carey.

In 2013, Zhang was promoted to chief operating officer of Alibaba Group, and eventually succeeded Jonathan Lu as the CEO in 2015. On September 10, 2018, Jack Ma announced that Zhang would also take over as executive chairman, effective in one year on September 10, 2019.

Alibaba employees pick nicknames for themselves when they first join the company. Daniel Zhang's nickname is "Free and Unfettered Person" (Chinese: 逍遥子; pinyin: Xiāoyáo Zi).

On September 10, 2023, Daniel Zhang stepped down as CEO and chairman, and Eddie Wu replaced him as the new CEO and Joseph Tsai replaced him as the new chairman. Following his departure in 2023, Zhang was said to have headed Alibaba's Cloud Intelligence Unit, but in September 2023, Daniel Zhang stepped down from Alibaba Cloud Intelligence just two months after leaving his role as group CEO and chairman. CEO Eddie Wu took charge of the cloud business after Zhang's departure. The cloud business was part of a major restructuring of Alibaba's e-commerce platform into six units, announced in March 2023. According to a Reuters article in 2023, "Daniel had expressed his wish to transition away from his role as chairman and CEO of Cloud Intelligence Group." The board respected and accepted his decision, marking the end of a 16-year leadership chapter for Zhang and highlighting his personal choice to leave the operational helm of Alibaba Cloud. Ultimately, Zhang's wish to step away led to a major leadership transition in Alibaba's cloud division, marking a major leadership transition.
