= Peggy Yu =

Chinese businesswoman

Peggy Yu (俞渝)
- Born: May 1965 (age 61); Chongqing, China
- Education: Beijing Foreign Studies University, New York University
- Occupations: Co-founder and chairwoman, dangdang.com
- Spouse: Li Guoqing

Peggy Yu or Yu Yu (Chinese: 俞渝; pinyin: Yú Yú; born 1965) is a Chinese businesswoman. She is the co-founder and chairwoman of dangdang.com, the largest online book retailer in China.

== Early life ==
Yu was born in Chongqing, China in 1965. She graduated from Beijing Foreign Studies University and began working as an interpreter and secretary for a general manager of the boiler supplier Babcock & Wilcox Beijing Company Ltd (B&WBC). In 1987, she went to the United States to continue her studies, and in 1992 she earned an MBA from New York University, where she gave the commencement speech on behalf of her classmates. Yu went to work on Wall Street, and lived in the United States for ten years. In 1996, she met Li Guoqing, a book publisher. They married after dating for three months.

== Career ==
In 1999, Yu and her husband launched an online bookstore, Dangdang. Yu is the chairwoman of the company. She had the idea for the company during her stay in the United States, when studying the establishment and development of Amazon.com since early 1995 when she was working on Wall Street. When she met her husband, they decided to start a similar online company in China. Since the company's creation in 1999, Dangdang has expanded to become an online bookstore with over 6,000,000 books, as well as home goods, clothing, jewelry, cosmetics, DVDs, and movies.

On July 9, 2015, almost five years after Dangdang went public on the New York Stock Exchange, Yu proposed to buy out the company from shareholders at a valuation of $630 million, less than half of Dangdang's IPO valuation. The proposed buyout price, $7.81 per ADS, was the lowest among all Chinese ADRs seeking to go private, 20% lower than the company's prior 30 days average trading price, according to Bloomberg.

Dangdang shareholders protested the proposed offer and launched a shareholder activism website, dangdangfacts.com, which asserted that Yu had unfairly taken advantage of minority shareholders.
