= Youngor Group =

Chinese clothing and textiles company

Youngor Group Company Limited 雅戈尔集团股份有限公司
- Company type: Public company
- Industry: Textiles and clothing
- Founded: 1979
- Headquarters: Ningbo, Zhejiang, China
- Area served: People's Republic of China
- Key people: Chairman: Mr. Li Rucheng
- Website: Youngor Group Company Limited

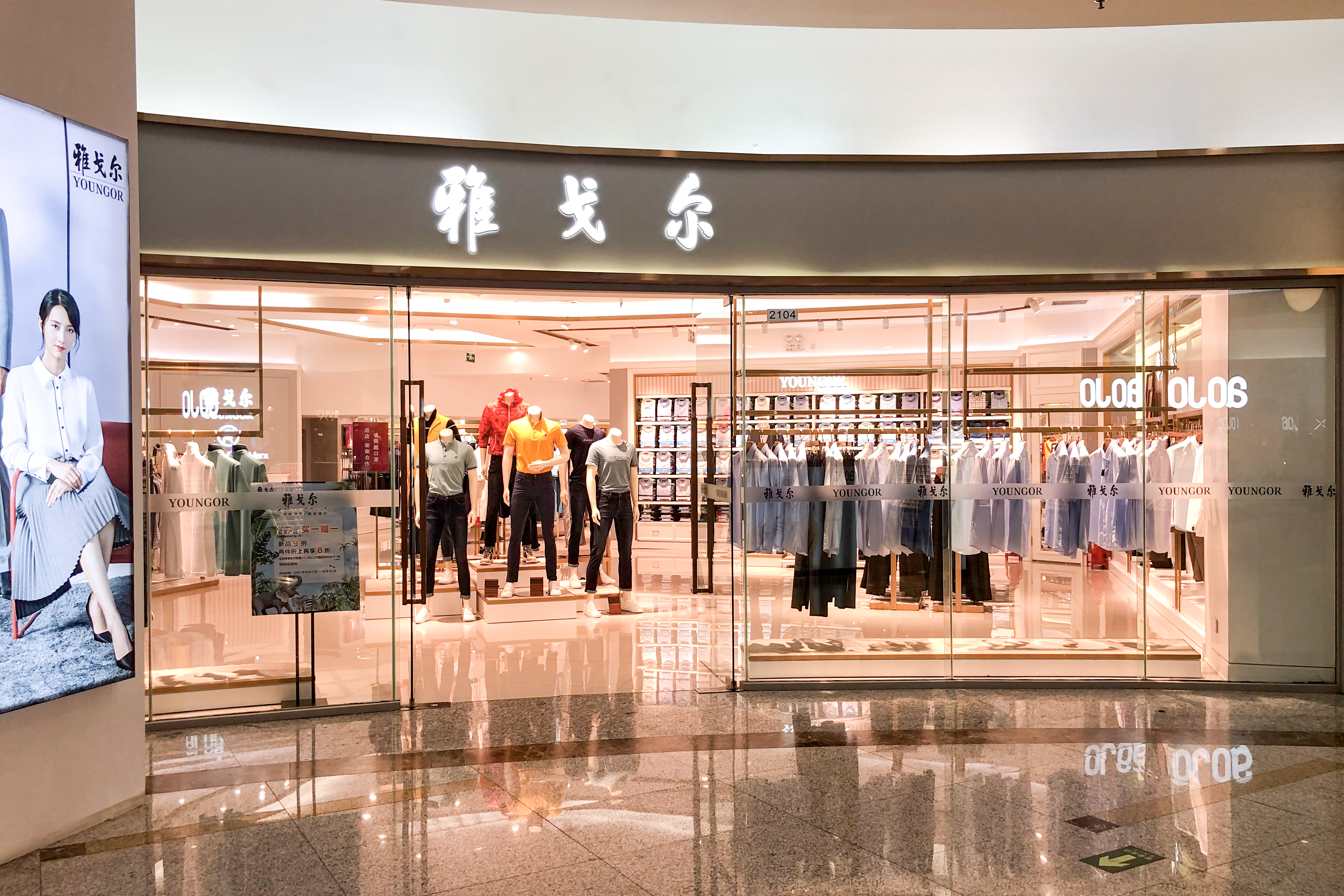
A Youngor clothing store at Golden Resources Mall, Beijing in 2021

Youngor Group Company Limited (SSE: 600177) is a public textiles and clothing enterprise in Ningbo, Zhejiang, China. It is engaged in designing, manufacturing and selling clothing products with its "Youngor" brand for gentlemen’s clothing. Youngor was established in 1993, and it was listed on the Shanghai Stock Exchange in 1998.

Youngor is primarily engaged in manufacture of apparels and textile products, as well as property development. Its major products are suits, shirts and casual wears, with the brand named Youngor, as well as woven fabrics. It also develops residential communities, villas and commercial office buildings in Ningbo and Hangzhou, Zhejiang province, as well as Suzhou, Jiangsu province. It operates its businesses in domestic and overseas markets.

In December 2024, Alibaba announced it would sell Intime Department Store to Youngor Group.

== Controversy ==
=== Environmental practices ===
In July 2011, Youngor - along with other major fashion and sportswear brands including Nike, Adidas and Abercrombie & Fitch - was the subject of a report by the environmental group Greenpeace entitled 'Dirty Laundry'. Youngor is accused of working with suppliers in China who, according to the findings of the report, contribute to the pollution of the Yangtze and Pearl Rivers. Samples taken from one facility belonging to the Youngor Group located on the Yangtze River Delta and another belonging to the Well Dyeing Factory Ltd. located on a tributary of the Pearl River Delta revealed the presence of hazardous and persistent hormone disruptor chemicals, including alkylphenols, perfluorinated compounds and perfluorooctane sulfonate.
