= Tmall Genie =

- Developer: Alibaba Group
- Type: Smart speaker
- Released: July 2017 (limited beta); August 8, 2017 (China)
- Introductory price: ¥499
- Input: Voice commands
- Connectivity: Wi-Fi 2.4 GHz, Bluetooth 4.0
- Dimensions: 83 mm (3.27 in) diameter, 126 mm (4.96 in) high
- Weight: 400 g (0.88 lb)
- Website: bot.tmall.com

The Tmall Genie (Chinese: 天猫精灵, pinyin: Tiān māo jīng líng) is a smart speaker developed by Chinese e-commerce company Alibaba Group, using the intelligent personal assistant service AliGenie. Introduced in July 2017, the device consists of a cylindrical body with omni-directional speakers and an LED light ring at the bottom of the device. As with other smart speakers, the Genie supports web searches, music streaming, home automation devices, and placing orders for products from Tmall. Voice interaction with the device is currently limited to Mandarin, but plans to extend voice recognition to include Sichuanese, Cantonese, and eventually all major Chinese dialects were announced in March 2019 when Alibaba allocated 100 million yuan (US$15 million) for research and development.
