= Dangdang =

Chinese e-commerce company

E-commerce China Dangdang Inc. 当当网
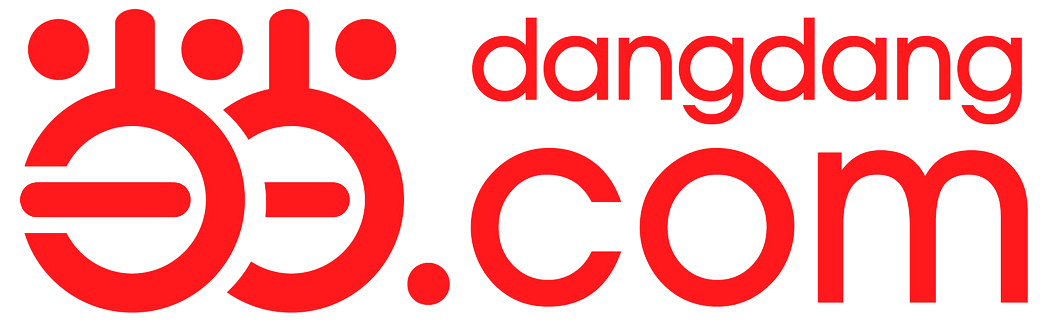
- Company type: Private company
- Website type: E-commerce
- Available in: Chinese
- Headquarters: Beijing, People's Republic of China
- Area served: People's Republic of China
- Founders: Peggy Yu; Li Guoqing
- Key people: Peggy Yu (CEO, Chairwoman)
- Industry: Online shopping
- Employees: 2,907
- Website: Dangdang.com
- Advertising: Web banner
- Launched: 1999

E-commerce China Dangdang Inc. (Chinese: 当当网), known as Dangdang, is a Chinese electronic commerce company, founded by Peggy Yu and Li Guoqing in 1999. It is headquartered in Beijing and its main competitors are Amazon.cn (or Amazon China, formerly Joyo.com) and JD.com (or Jingdong, formerly 360buy.com). The competition escalated into a price war in December 2010, with each retailer marking down a wide range of items, especially books. DangDang made an IPO on the NYSE in November 2010, estimated at US$1 billion.

== Products ==
There are 2,907 employees in Dangdang, and its customers span across 50 countries, and over 40% B2C customers in China have shopping experiences with Dangdang.

== History ==
- November 1999: Website launched
- December 2010: Dangdang is listed on the NYSE in the U.S.
- July 2015: Dangdang Chairwoman Peggy Yu and CEO Quoqing Li proposed to buyout the company at $7.81 per ADS, which is less than half of its IPO value and even well below the prior 30 days average stock price. Bloomberg reported that Dangdang's buyout proposal is the lowest among all Chinese ADRs seeking to go private historically.
- May 2015: Dangdang Special Committee approved the management buyout at $6.7 per ADS.
- August 2015: Many shareholders of Dangdang chose to dissent from the Merger by exercising shareholder appraisal rights according to Cayman Companies Law Section 238.
- September 2015: Dangdang completes its privatization.
