= DingTalk =

Instant messaging software

- Developer: Alibaba Group
- Release: December 1, 2014; 11 years ago
- Operating system: iOS, Android, Mac OS, Windows, HarmonyOS NEXT, web, Linux
- Available in: Simplified Chinese, Traditional Chinese, English, Vietnamese, Japanese, Thai
- Type: Instant messaging client
- Website: www.dingtalk.com

DingTalk (Chinese: 钉钉; pinyin: Dīngdīng) is an enterprise communication and collaboration platform developed by Alibaba Group. It was founded in 2014 and headquartered in Hangzhou. By 2018, it was one of the world's largest professional communication and management mobile apps in China with over 100 million users.International market intentions were announced in 2018.

DingTalk provides iOS and Android apps as well as Mac and Windows clients. A version of the app for HarmonyOS was in development as of 2023.

== History ==
On January 16, 2015, DingTalk launched the testing version 1.1.0.

On May 26, 2015, V2.0 was released, adding Ding Mail, Smart OA and shared storage.

On September 19, 2016, V3.0 was released, focusing on B2B communication and collaboration.

On January 15, 2018, DingTalk launched the English version of its application in Malaysia, its first market outside of China (although it can be downloaded and used in other markets such as Bangladesh, US, etc.). At the same time, DingTalk noted that in November 2017 it had launched hardware devices such as the "smart receptionist" that enables employee check-in by fingerprint or facial recognition.

During the COVID-19 pandemic in Wuhan, the app was the target of review bomb after it was used to send homework to quarantined school children.

On April 8, 2020, DingTalk Lite was released on various app stores across key Asian markets, including Japan, Indonesia, Malaysia, and other countries and regions. DingTalk Lite comes with necessary features such as messaging, file sharing, and video conferencing. It supports video-conferencing for over 300 people simultaneously and a live-broadcast function for more than 1000 participants. The app offers AI-enabled translation of messages in 14 languages including Chinese, Japanese, and English.

In 2023, Alibaba's official work communication tool, DingTalk, had 700 million active users, and 25 million organizations and enterprises used the app.The number of DAUs paid was 28 million, and the number of software paying companies using the application had reached 120,000. At this time, DingTalk had more than 20 product lines and 80 scenarios integrated with the app, and around 700,000 companies had actually used DingTalk AI.

In 2024, Alibaba's workplace messaging app, DingTalk was set to break even with a US $200 million in core revenue over the past six months.The revenue is generated through software subscriptions annually by workplaces in need of a communication workplace tool. The collaboration application is competing with other tools like TikTok owner ByteDance and Tencent Holdings for corporate users. The most recent figures for 2026 show the same reported annual recurring revenue (ARR) exceeds $200 million. ARR measures annual subscription income, which for DingTalk comes primarily from software subscriptions sold to workplaces seeking communication and collaboration tools. DingTalk competes with ByteDance and Tencent for corporate users. The separate business unit aims to break even in 2025, marking a milestone since it began charging for premium services and previously earned over $100 million in its first commercial year. Since becoming an independent unit in August 2023, DingTalk has accelerated monetization through AI-powered features, including automated workflows and smart document tools, while expanding into markets like Hong Kong to broaden its enterprise customer base beyond China.

In August 2025, DingTalk and Alibaba's Tongyi Lab launched a Fun-ASR which is a speech recognition large language model that is designed to understand terminology from more than ten industries and supports custom training for enterprise-specific models.The model is included in DingTalk's meeting subtitles, live transcriptions, meeting summaries and voice-assistant features.

== Features ==
- All messaging types including text messages, voice messages, pictures, files, DingMails. The Unique Read/Unread Mode is to improve communication efficiency and messages can be delivered with DING, which can alert the recipients through phone call, SMS, and the app itself.
- All organizational contacts are unified into one online platform
- Audio conference call support for up to 30 parties
- SmartWork OA for managing internal workflows such as employee leaves, travel applications, and reimbursement. Records can be summed up and exported. In the future, more 3rd party applications and functions will be integrated.
- DingTalk is one of the first Chinese apps to have obtained the ISO/IEC 27001:2013 standard. Data is encrypted to SSL/TLS security standards.
- Smart hardware C1 and M2, "smart" applications
- AI Sheets which enables AI to understand data and perform different tasks. Touted as AI that helps to complete 1000 tasks in an hour the features helps easy data analysis for everyone. Users just need to describe their need in natural language and the AI tool automatically generate complex calculation formulas and instantly create professional charts.

== See also ==
- Comparison of cross-platform instant messaging clients
- Comparison of instant messaging protocols
- Comparison of Internet Relay Chat clients
- Comparison of LAN messengers
- Comparison of VoIP software
- List of SIP software
- List of video telecommunication services and product brands
