= Jenny Zeng =

Chinese venture capitalist and serial entrepreneur

- 曾玉
- Born: Chongqing, China
- Education: Beijing Electronic Industrial Management Institute
- Occupations: entrepreneur, venture capitalist
- Years active: 2002–present
- Title: Managing partner of MSA Capital

Yu Zeng (Chinese: 曾玉), commonly known as Jenny Zeng, is a Chinese venture capitalist and a serial entrepreneur. She is the founder and a managing partner at venture capital firm MSA Capital. In 2011 she was named one of China's 30 most influential businesswomen by the China Entrepreneur Magazine.

Zeng is also a board member of the Future Forum and a member of The Nature Conservancy.

== Biography ==
She was the third daughter of her parents. She studied international trade at Beijing Electronic Industrial Management Institute and graduated in 1996.

In 2002, she became the first executive director of China Venture Capital Association. She started her first company Maple Valley Investments in 2004. Maple Valley gained fame by helping InTime Department Store raise US$90 million of private investment and later go public and attracted many other high-profile clients.

In 2014, she founded MSA Capital which focuses on investing in AI, genomics, mobility, consumer internet and SaaS. Her investments have included Mobike and Uber.

== Personal life ==
Zeng gave birth to a child in the spring of 2010.
