= AliOS =

Linux distribution designed for smartphones

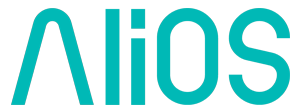
- Developer: Alibaba Cloud
- OS family: Android OS
- Working state: Current
- Source model: Closed source
- Initial release: 28 July 2011; 15 years ago
- Latest release: 2.0 / 22 September 2018; 8 years ago
- Official website: alios.cn (Chinese)

AliOS Things
- Developer: Alibaba Cloud
- OS family: Real-time operating systems
- Working state: Current
- Source model: Open source
- Initial release: 20 October 2017; 9 years ago
- Latest release: 3.1.0 / 10 April 2020; 6 years ago
- Latest preview: 4.0 / 16 October 2020; 6 years ago
- Repository: github.com/alibaba/AliOS-Things
- Official website: aliosthings.io

AliOS (formerly YunOS and Aliyun OS) is a Linux distribution developed by Alibaba Cloud, a subsidiary of Mainland Chinese company Alibaba Group. It is designed for smart cars and Internet of Things (IoT) devices, and it had been used as a mobile operating system.

== History ==
On 28 July 2011, Alibaba Cloud confirmed the existence of its own mobile operating system, the YunOS. The system was described as the result of three years of development and uses Alibaba Cloud's self-developed distributed file system and virtual machine, making it fully compatible with Android-based applications. With its YunOS, the company is challenging the dominant Android in China and is also looking to expand into Western markets. It was first used in the K-Touch W700 in 2011.

As of May 2012, 1 million YunOS-powered smartphones have been sold. It was expected to become the second biggest operating system in China by shipments at the end of 2016, with 14% of the market. The latest publicly available version of YunOS, YunOS 5 Atom, as a forked version of Android 6.0, was released on 10 December 2015.

In October 2017, Alibaba Group decided to upgrade its operating system strategy to focus investment on the burgeoning Internet of Things sector. As part of the move, Alibaba rebranded its YunOS operating system as AliOS, an operating system offering OS solutions for automobile, industrial and IoT devices. The integration of AliOS with Alibaba's internet-connected car ran a dashboard based on the AliOS system, which at the time was referred to as the YunOS software. It was already being used to power phones and tablets, as well as home appliances like refrigerators and air conditioners from other makers. But the company stressed that the cars will run independently of users' smartphones. The cars were sold through Tmall, while components compatible with AliOS software systems were sold through sister sites like Alibaba. At the same time, Alibaba introduced an open-source IoT edition of AliOS, named as AliOS Things.

== Overview ==
AliOS revolves around the idea of bringing cloud functionality to smart devices. According to the company, AliOS will feature cloud-based e-mail, Web search, weather updates, and GPS navigation tools.In addition, the AliOS services will synchronize and store call data, text messages, and photos in the cloud for access across other devices, including personal computers. Alibaba says it will offer customers 100 GB of storage at launch.AliOS would allow users to access applications from the Web, rather than download apps to their devices. In the meantime, AliOS Things, as a lightweight IoT embedded operating system for the IoT field, would be suitable for all kinds of small loT devices, and can be widely used in smart home, smart city, new travel and other fields. Alibaba AI tools like Accio Work are not run by AliOS, and there is no technical link between the two. AliOS is an embedded Linux-based operating system for vehicles and IoT devices that are related to AI workflows. Many AI tools rely on data and trends that are retrieved from the internet and source engines.

== Relations with Android ==
According to Google, AliOS is a forked but incompatible version of its open-source Android operating system. Google therefore attempted to prevent Acer Inc. from shipping an AliOS-powered phone, arguing that Acer, a member of the Open Handset Alliance, had agreed not to produce phones running incompatible Android versions. Andy Rubin, who at the time was in charge of the Android division at Google, stated that while AliOS is not part of the Android ecosystem, it uses runtimes, framework and various tools from Android. In 2012, Google's chief Android engineer, Andy Rubin, denied accusations that Google forced Acer to stop using Alibaba's Aliyun platform in a blog post. This came when a press conference was abruptly canceled that Acerto and Alibaba were going to hold jointly to launch an Aliyun-powered smartphone. Rubin explained that compatibility was important for the Android ecosystem to be able to ensure that a consistent experience is presented to customers, developers, and manufacturers. Non-compatible systems like Aliyun would only weaken this kind of consistency.

Alibaba disputes the claim that AliOS is a version of Android by stating the following:

"Aliyun OS [now AliOS] incorporates its own virtual machine, which is different from Android's Dalvik virtual machine. AliOS' runtime environment, which is the core of the OS, consists of both its own Java virtual machine, which is different from Android’s Dalvik virtual machine, and its own cloud app engine, which supports HTML5 web applications. AliOS uses some of the Android application framework and tools (open source) merely as a patch to allow AliOS users to enjoy third-party apps in addition to the cloud-based AliOS apps in our ecosystem."

However, as of September 2012, the AliOS app store still contains some pirated Android applications, including many from Google. After Acer canceled the launch, AliOS focused more on smart cars and the Internet of Things to avoid the Android market. As of 2024-2025, AliOS is concentrating on Alibaba Cloud ecosystems.

== AliOS Things ==
AliOS Things is the IoT version of AliOS announced and open-sourced in 2017. It is designed for low power, resource constrained MCUs, as well as connectivity SoCs.

AliOS Things comes in two editions, one based on the Linux kernel and the other based on Rhino, Alibaba's RTOS kernel. AliOS Things is built for connected devices with limited resources and is part of a wider shift from consumer mobile OS work toward IoT, industrial, and vehicle use cases. In AliOS Things 3.0, Alibaba added a new development framework, component customization, including JavaScript support, and microkernel-based isolation. The platform will help device makers manage and construct smart devices in a more efficient manner, which includes over-the-air upgrades and cloud-linked activation. Alibaba described the OS as a strategy that will be used across multiple platforms, including mobile, industrial, and IoT devices. Alibaba wanted to ultimately open-source the operating system to provide OS to customers across all industries and professions.

== Controversy ==
In November 2015, following Chinese State Administration of Press, Publication, Radio, Film and Television's policy, dozens of third-party applications installed by users on their own YunOS set-top boxes were automatically removed and blocked from re-installation.

== See also ==
- Flyme OS
- HarmonyOS
