= Alibaba Group =

Chinese multinational technology company

Coordinates: 30°11′31″N 120°11′07″E

Alibaba Group Holding Limited

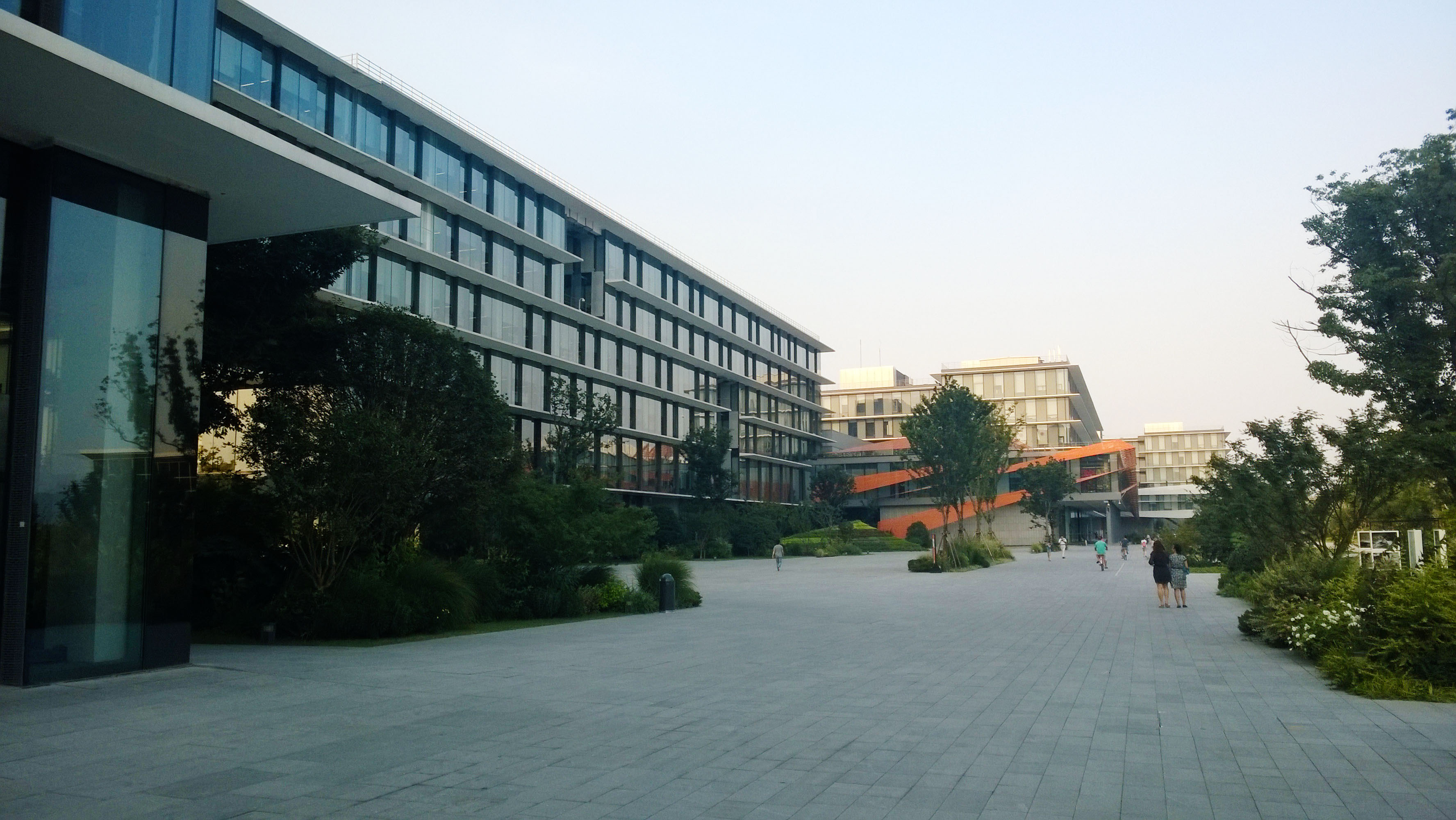
- "Taobao City", the main corporate campus of Alibaba Group at Xixi, Hangzhou
- Native name: 阿里巴巴集团控股有限公司
- Type: Public
- Traded as: NYSE: BABA; SEHK: 9988; Hang Seng Index component
- ISIN: KYG017191142 (SEHK); US01609W1027 (NYSE)
- Industry: E-commerce; Retail; Internet; Cloud computing; Artificial intelligence; Digital media; Logistics
- Founded: 28 June 1999; 27 years ago Hangzhou, Zhejiang, China
- Founder: Jack Ma
- Headquarters: No. 969 West Wen Yi Road, Yuhang District, Hangzhou, Zhejiang, China and George Town, Cayman Islands
- Area served: Worldwide
- Key people: Joseph Tsai (chairman); Eddie Wu (CEO); J. Michael Evans (president)
- Products: AliOS; AliGenie; DingTalk; Tongyi Qianwen (Qwen)
- Services: Alibaba.com; Taobao; Tmall; AliExpress; Lazada; 1688.com; Alibaba Cloud; Cainiao; Youku; Ele.me; Daraz; Goofish; Fliggy; Miravia
- Revenue: ▲CN¥996.35 billion (2025) (US$148.73 billion)
- Operating income: ▲CN¥140.91 billion (2025) (US$21.03 billion)
- Net income: ▲CN¥80.01 billion (2025) (US$11.94 billion)
- Total assets: ▼CN¥520.82 billion (2025) (US$77.75 billion)
- Total equity: ▼CN¥1.01 trillion (2025) (US$150.75 billion)
- Number of employees: ▼124,320 (2025)
- Subsidiaries: See companies and affiliated entities

Chinese name
- Simplified Chinese: 阿里巴巴集团
- Traditional Chinese: 阿里巴巴集團
Transcriptions
Standard Mandarin
- Hanyu Pinyin: Ālǐbābā Jítuán
- Bopomofo: ㄚ ㄌㄧˇ ㄅㄚ ㄅㄚ ㄐㄧˊ ㄊㄨㄢˊ
- Gwoyeu Romatzyh: Aliibaba Jyitwan
- Wade–Giles: A^{1}-li^{3}-pa^{1}-pa^{1} Chi^{2}-t'uan^{2}
- Tongyong Pinyin: A-lǐ-ba-ba Jí-tuán
- IPA: [á.lì.pá.pá tɕǐ.tʰwǎn]
Yue: Cantonese
- Yale Romanization: Aléihbābā Jaahptyùhn
- Jyutping: aa3 leoi5 baa1 baa1 zaap6 tyun4
- IPA: [a˧ lɵɥ˩˧ pa˥ pa˥ tsap̚˨ tʰyn˩]
- Website: alibabagroup.com

Alibaba Group Holding Limited, branded as Alibaba (/ˌæliˈbɑːbə, ˌɑː-/), is a Chinese multinational technology company specializing in e-commerce, retail, Internet, and technology. Founded on 28 June 1999 in Hangzhou, Zhejiang, the company provides consumer-to-consumer (C2C), business-to-consumer (B2C), and business-to-business (B2B) sales services via Chinese and global marketplaces, as well as local consumer, digital media and entertainment, logistics, and cloud computing services. It owns and operates a diverse portfolio of companies around the world in numerous business sectors.

On 19 September 2014, Alibaba's American initial public offering (IPO) on the New York Stock Exchange raised US$25 billion, giving the company a market value of US$231 billion and, by far, then the largest IPO in world history. It is one of the top 10 most valuable corporations, and is named the 31st-largest public company in the world on the Forbes Global 2000 2020 list. In January 2018, Alibaba became the second Asian company to break the US$500 billion valuation mark, after its competitor Tencent.

Alibaba is one of the world's largest retailers and e-commerce companies. In 2020, it was also rated as the fifth-largest artificial intelligence company. The company hosts the largest B2B (Alibaba.com), C2C (Taobao), and B2C (Tmall) marketplaces in the world. It has been expanding into the media industry, with revenues rising by triple percentage points year after year. It also set the record on the 2018 edition of China's Singles' Day, the world's biggest online and offline shopping day. Kuo Zhang has served as the President of Alibaba.com since July 2017, and he oversaw the company's global B2B marketplace, including agentic commerce tools like Accio Works. His predecessor was Trudy Shan Dai, who was also an Alibaba co-founder and had also been President of Alibaba.com and 1688 since January 2017, before moving to lead Alibaba's core domestic e-commerce businesses in 2023. Zhang previously held senior roles in Taobao and Tmall before joining Alibaba.com in 2011. In a September 2026 Fortune article, Kuo Zhang described how the best frontier models of AI agents only completed about 61 to 62% of tasks correctly. Zhang said the 40% gap shows that companies cannot simply hand whole workflows to AI agents but must use benchmarks to measure which narrow tasks can be safely executed without human intervention.

== Naming ==
The company's name came from the character Ali Baba from the Middle Eastern folk-tale collection One Thousand and One Nights because of its universal appeal.

== History ==
=== Founding ===
On 28 June 1999, Jack Ma, with 17 friends and students founded Alibaba.com, a China-based B2B marketplace site, in his Hangzhou apartment. In October 1999, Alibaba received a US$25 million investment from Investor AB, Goldman Sachs and SoftBank. In 1999, Investor AB owned 6% of the shares. In 2002, Alibaba.com became profitable.

=== Taobao formation ===
When eBay announced its expansion into China in 2003, Ma viewed the American company as a foreign competitor and created Taobao as a subsidiary to try and win the domestic market. Taobao gained consumer trust in the Chinese e-commerce market with features like third party verification and offering most services for free before making a return on additional services. Taobao surpassed eBay in 2007, and eBay later closed its unprofitable China Web unit.

=== Pre-IPO expansion ===
In 2005, Yahoo! invested in Alibaba through a variable interest entity (VIE) structure, buying a 40% stake in the company for US$1 billion. In 2012, China Investment Corporation led a group of Chinese investors in buying out Yahoo!'s 40% stake and in buying the Alibaba shares that had traded on the Hong Kong Stock Exchange.

According to Li Chuan, a senior executive at Alibaba, the company was planning in 2013 to open traditional brick and mortar retail outlets in partnership with Wanda Group, a Chinese real estate company. Additionally, Alibaba purchased a 25% stake in Hong Kong-listed Chinese department store chain Intime Retail in early 2014. In early 2017, Alibaba and Intime's founder Shen Guojun agreed to pay HK$19.8 billion (US$2.6 billion) to take the store chain private. Alibaba's stake—28% from 2014's US$692 million investment—rose about 74% after the deal.

In April 2014, Alibaba invested in Lyft, along with Coatue Management, and Andreessen Horowitz; they led a US$250 million Series D financing round. On 5 June 2014, Alibaba bought a 50% stake of Guangzhou Evergrande F.C. from Evergrande Real Estate Group Ltd. in a deal that was worth 1.2 billion yuan (US$192 million).

=== IPO ===
On 5 September 2014, Alibaba set a US$60- to $66- per-share price range for its scheduled initial public offering (IPO). On 18 September 2014, Alibaba's IPO priced at US$68, raising US$25 billion for the company and investors. Alibaba was the biggest IPO in history, bigger than Google, Facebook, and Twitter combined. On 22 September 2014, Alibaba's underwriters announced their confirmation that they had exercised a greenshoe option to sell 15% more shares than originally planned.

Alibaba and the underwriters of its IPO were sued in a California superior court in a consolidated class action lawsuit. The lawsuit was filed in October 2015 on behalf of investors who purchased Alibaba's American depositary shares alleging violations of the Securities Act. Alibaba reached a settlement agreement in December 2018, subject to court approval, in which it agreed to pay $75 million to settle the lawsuit.

=== Minor acquisitions ===
In 2015, Alibaba's Mobile Business Group formed Ali Literature to enter the internet literature sector.

Beginning in mid-2015, Alibaba invested in Paytm, an India-based mobile payment platform.

Alibaba is among the most prominent investors in Thailand's Eastern Economic Corridor, which was opened in 2018. Alibaba committed approximately US$320 million for the development of an e-commerce digital hub in the EEC.

In January 2017, Alibaba and the International Olympic Committee jointly announced an $800 million deal that would last until 2028 where the company would sponsor the Olympic Games.

=== Leadership change ===
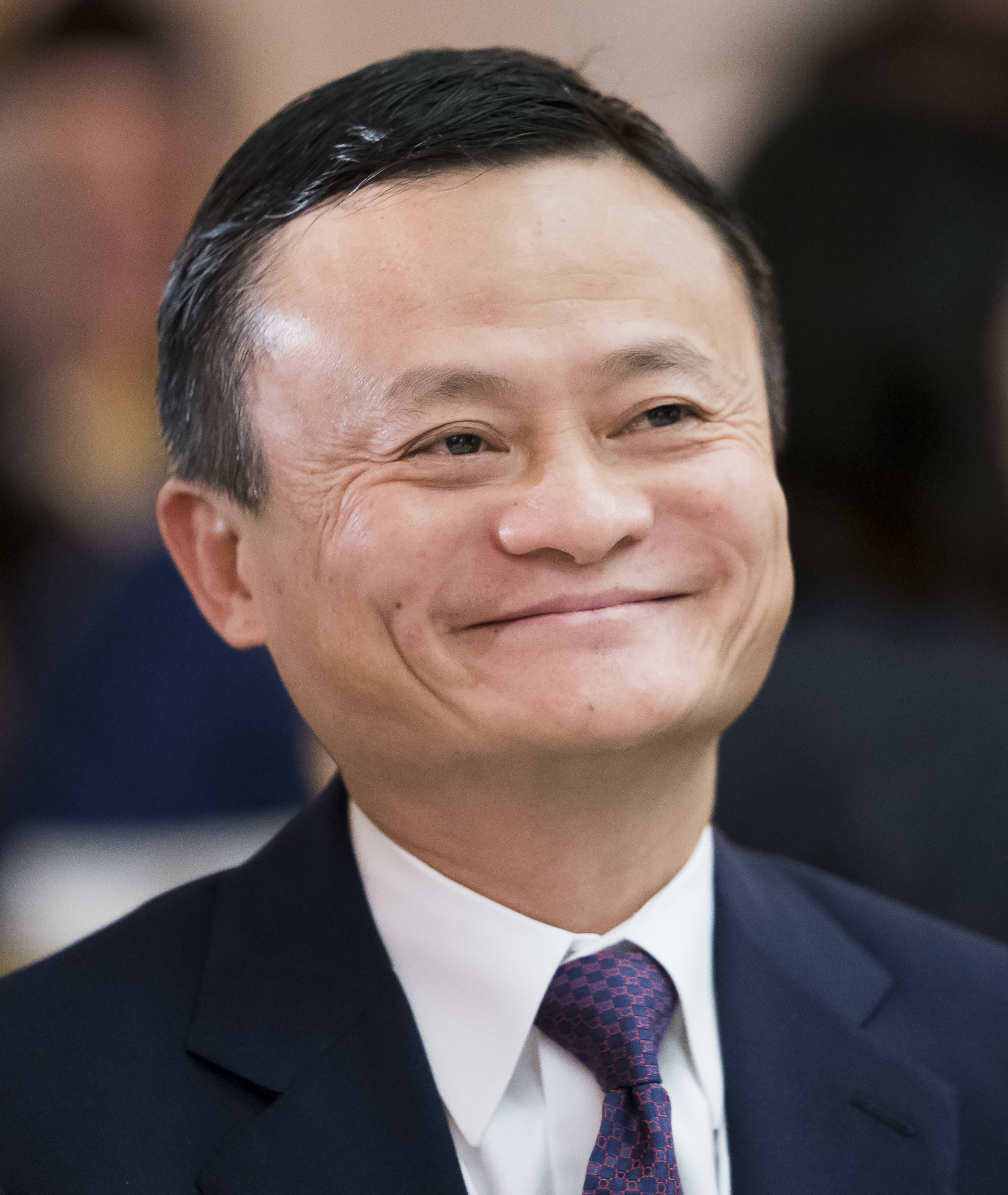
Jack Ma, founder and the former executive chairman of the Alibaba Group

In September 2018, Jack Ma, the main founder of Alibaba, announced that he would step down as chairman in a year's time so he could focus on philanthropy. In response to the announcement, The Economist stated that Ma had a significant impact in China and worldwide. On Tuesday, 10 September 2019, Jack Ma officially stepped down as the chairman of Alibaba, and Daniel Zhang succeeded him at the head of the company.

=== Hong Kong listing ===
In November 2019, Alibaba raised 12.9 billion in its secondary listing in Hong Kong, which became the world's largest offering that year.

In November 2020, Chinese leader Xi Jinping blocked the Ant Group IPO. Economist Bo Zhuang stated the block was part of the CCP's increased scrutiny of finance and technology companies.

In December 2020, the shares of Alibaba Group suffered a stock price crash to the lowest close in around 6 months, following the antitrust investigation into the company by Chinese regulators. In December 2020, China's State Administration for Market Regulation (SAMR) stated that it opened an investigation into Alibaba over monopolistic practices. The country's central bank, as well as three other regulators, confirmed in a separate statement that the affiliated Ant Group would also be summoned for discussions over "competition and consumer rights", where regulators instructed the company to return its focus to digital-payments. People's Daily, the official newspaper of the Central Committee of the Chinese Communist Party, endorsed the investigation shortly after the announcement, claiming the investigation to be "an important step in strengthening antimonopoly oversight in the internet sphere". As a result, from the antitrust probe, Alibaba lost nearly all of its stock-market gains in 2020, from $859 billion to $586 billion, by the end of December. Jack Ma, co-founder of both Alibaba and Ant Group, vanished from public view when Ant's IPO was suspended in early November, but resurfaced in January 2021 in a 50-second video, appearing briefly via video link at the digitally facilitated Rural Teacher Initiative. As of February 2021, he has yet to be seen in public. The video appearance caused Alibaba stock to increase 7%. Jack Ma made a public appearance in Hangzhou, China in March 2023 where he met with students and teachers at the Alibaba partners-funded Yungu School.

In February 2021, Alibaba sold $5 billion in bonds, the company's third large sale of dollar bonds, issuing four sets priced to yield between 2.143% and 3.251%. The four sets of bonds were $1.5 billion of both 10-year and 30-year debt along with $1 billion of bonds due in 20 and 40 years. The 20-year bonds were designated as sustainability notes.

On 9 April 2021, as part of a Chinese crackdown on big tech, SAMR issued a $2.8 billion fine against Alibaba for anti-competitive practices and ordered Alibaba to file self-examination and compliance reports to the SAMR for three years. This amounted to 12% of its 2020 net profit. Critics say the move tightens the Chinese's governments control of tech companies. Alibaba stated that it would dedicate itself to correct its errors and accepted the fine without making any appeal.

On 11 November 2021, it was reported that over the course of its 11-day Singles' Day sales extravaganza, Chinese e-commerce giant Alibaba Group Holding received 540.3 billion yuan (S$114.4 billion) in orders, a 14 percent increase over the previous year.

In July 2022, the SEC added Alibaba to a list of companies facing delisting from U.S. stock exchanges if its auditors remain unable to examine Alibaba's books before 2024.

In December 2022, a state-owned enterprise of the China Internet Investment Fund, established by the Cyberspace Administration of China, took a 1 percent golden share investment in two Alibaba subsidiaries that control Youku and UCWeb.

=== 2023 restructuring to present ===
In March 2023, Alibaba announced its "1+6+N" restructuring plan, which reorganized its business structure into six independently run entities: Cloud Intelligence Group, Taobao and Tmall Group, Cainiao Smart Logistics Network, Local Services group, Alibaba International Digital Commerce, and the Digital Media and Entertainment group. Each business unit would have their own CEO and board of directors and be able to seek their own fundraising and market listings. Under the new "1+6+N" structure, Alibaba also established a Capital Management Committee and a Compliance and Risk Committee. The Wall Street Journal reported on 30 March that Jack Ma engineered this in talks with company CEO Daniel Zhang while he was overseas.

In September 2023, Cainiao Smart Logistics Network Ltd., the logistics arm of Alibaba Group, has filed for its Hong Kong initial public offering, potentially making it among the first of the Chinese e-commerce leader's units to go public.

In December 2024, Alibaba announced it would sell Intime Department Store to Youngor Group.

In November 2025, the Financial Times published a report stating that a U.S. national security memo accused Alibaba of providing capabilities to the People's Liberation Army used to target the U.S. Alibaba disputed the report. In January 2026, Texas governor Greg Abbott prohibited Alibaba products and services on all government devices and networks. In June 2026, the U.S. added the company to its list of "Chinese military companies," citing its affiliation with the Ministry of Industry and Information Technology. Alibaba subsequently filed a lawsuit against the U.S. government in an attempt to be removed from the list.

== Corporate affairs ==
The key trends for Alibaba are (as at the financial year ending 31 March):

	Revenue (US$ bn)	Net income (US$ bn)	Employees (k)
2016	15.6	11.0	36.4
2017	22.9	6.3	50.0
2018	39.8	10.1	66.4
2019	56.1	13.0	101
2020	71.9	21.1	117
2021	109	22.9	251
2022	134	9.8	254
2023	126	10.5	235
2024	130	11.0	205
2025	137	17.9	124

Alibaba is viewed by the Chinese government as one of its national champion corporations. Alibaba supplies a significant amount of technology for the Digital Silk Road.

== Companies and affiliated entities ==
=== E-commerce and retail service platforms ===
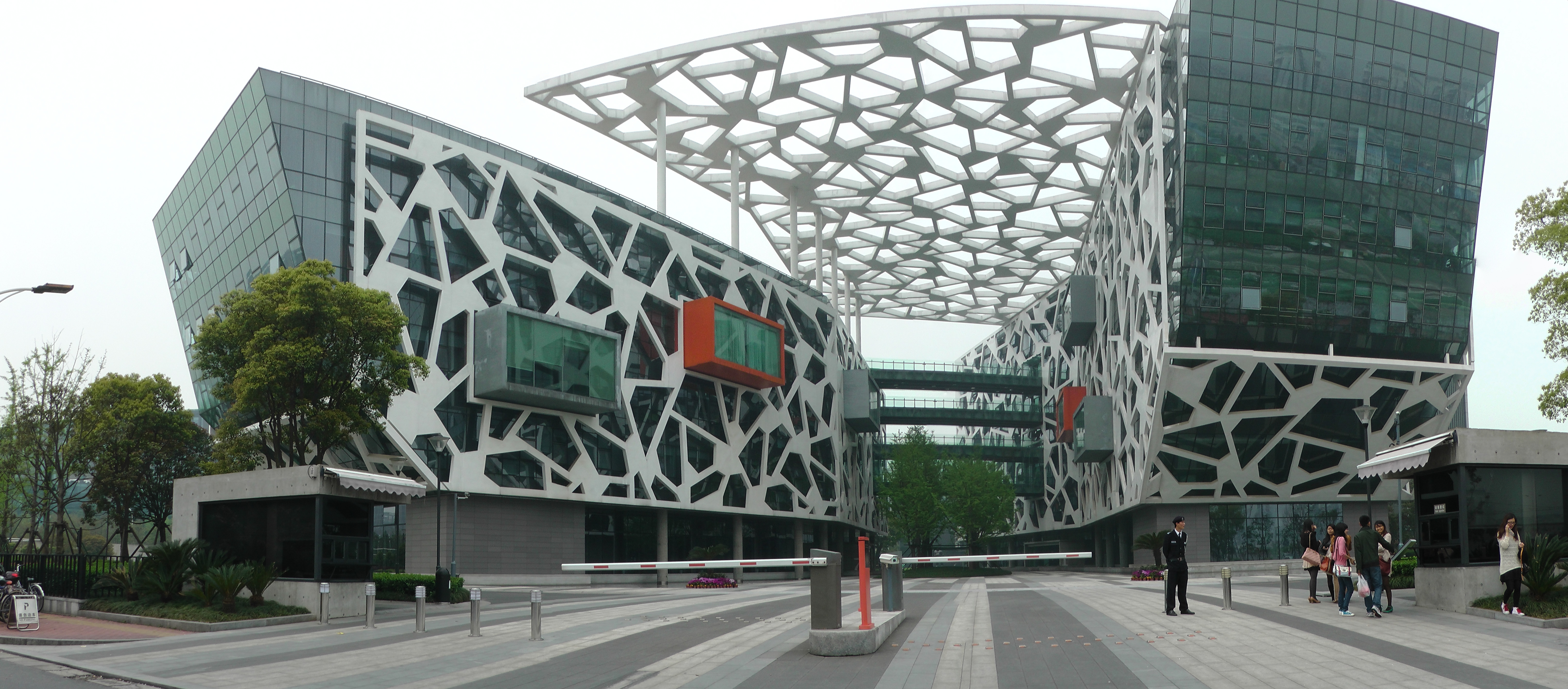
Alibaba group headquarters

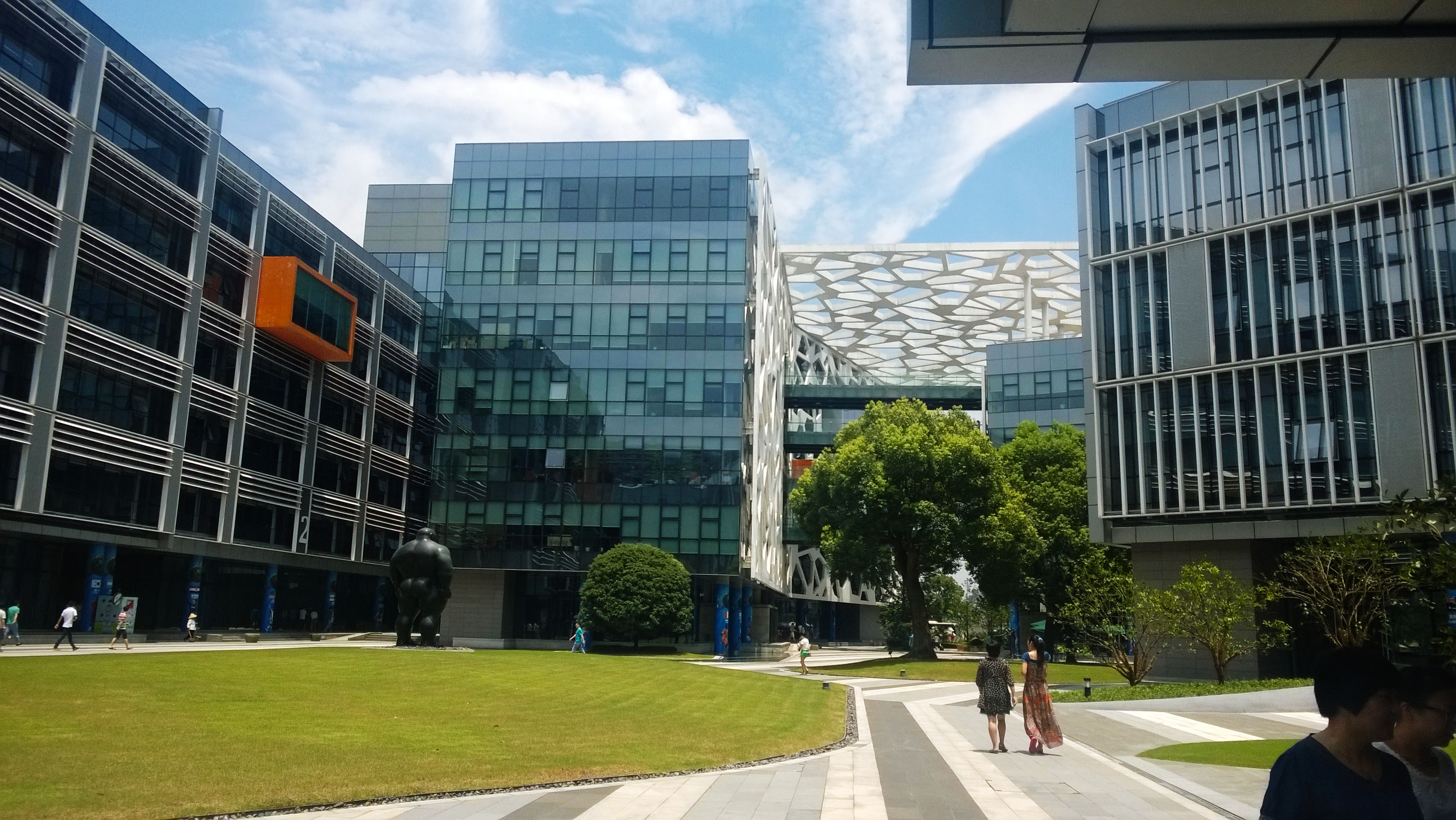
Alibaba Binjiang Campus in Hangzhou, headquarters for Alibaba's B2B service

Buyers who visit Alibaba.com are looking to purchase wholesale from thousands of product categories. Alibaba.com later became the world's largest online B2B trading platform for small businesses as of 2014. According to Alibaba.com's own website, there are 150,000 verified sellers located in more than 200 countries around the world. It also indicates that there are more than 10 million buyers around the world. In 2019, Alibaba.com allowed small and medium-sized U.S. businesses to sell on the site, and the company was actively looking to tap into the B2B e-commerce market in the US. The opportunity provided US business-to-business companies with the ability to also sell to other US retailers and smaller commercial outfits. In 2019, one-third of buyers on the site were US-based, while more than 95% of sellers were from China. Alibaba.com has three main services: the English language portal Alibaba.com, which handles sales between importers and exporters from nearly all countries, the Chinese portal 1688.com, which originally manages domestic B2B trade in China, and AliExpress.com, a global consumer B2C marketplace. In 2025, 1688.com has started marketing its platform globally. Alibaba.com went public at the Hong Kong Stock Exchange in 2007, and was delisted again in 2012. Two years later in 2014, Alibaba.com was privately held again following a $2.5 billion buyback. In 2013, 1688.com launched a direct channel that was responsible for $30 million in daily transaction value.

In 2003, Alibaba launched Taobao Marketplace (淘宝网), offering a variety of products for retail sales. Taobao grew to become China's largest C2C online shopping platform and later became the second most visited website in China, according to Alexa Internet. Taobao's growth was attributed to offering free registration and commission-free transactions using a free third-party payment platform. Advertising made up 75 percent of the company's total revenue, allowing it to break even in 2009. In 2010, Taobao's profit was estimated to be ¥1.5 billion (US$235.7 million), which was only about 0.4 percent of their total sales figure of ¥400 billion (US$62.9 billion) that year, way below the industry average of 2 percent, according to iResearch estimates. According to Zhang Yu, the director of Taobao, between 2011 and 2013, the number of stores on Taobao with annual sales under ¥100 thousand increased by 60%; the number of stores with sales between ¥10 thousand and ¥1 million increased by 30%, and the number of stores with sales over ¥1 million increased by 33%.

In April 2008, Taobao introduced a spin-off, Taobao Mall (淘宝商城, later Tmall.com), an online retail platform to complement the Taobao C2C portal, offering global brands to an increasingly affluent Chinese consumer base. It became the eighth most visited web site in China as of 2013. In 2012, Tmall.com later changed its Chinese name to Tianmao (天猫, "sky cat"), reflecting Tmall's Chinese pronunciation. In March 2010, Taobao launched the group shopping website Juhuasuan (聚划算), offering "flash sales", which are products that are available at a discount for only a fixed time period. In October 2010, Taobao beta-launched eTao, a comparison shopping website that offers search results from mostly Chinese online shopping platforms, including product searches, sales and coupon searches. According to the Alibaba Group web site, eTao offers products from Amazon China, Dangdang, Gome, Yihaodian, Nike China, and Vancl, as well as Taobao and Tmall. As part of a restructuring of Taobao by Alibaba, these spin-offs became separate companies in 2011, with Tmall and eTao becoming separate businesses in June and Juhuasuan becoming a separate business later in October.

In 2010, Alibaba launched AliExpress.com, an online retail service made up of mostly small Chinese businesses offering products to international online buyers. It is the most visited e-commerce platform in Russia. It allows small businesses in China to sell to customers all over the world, resulting in a wide variety of products. It might be more accurate to compare AliExpress to eBay, though, as sellers are independent; it simply serves as a host for other businesses to sell to consumers. Similar to eBay, sellers on Aliexpress can be either companies or individuals. It connects Chinese businesses directly with buyers. The main difference from Taobao is that it's aimed primarily at international buyers, incl. those from South Korea, Russia, the United Kingdom, France, Spain, Germany, Italy, the Netherlands, Ireland, Qatar, Saudi Arabia and the United Arab Emirates.

In 2012, Alibaba instituted its Public Dispute Resolution Center, which crowdsources buyers and sellers to vote on transactional rules and decide the outcome of disputes on the platform. This decentralized approach was popular and similar mechanisms were adopted or experimented with by other e-commerce platforms in China.

On 11 June 2014, Alibaba launched US shopping site 11 Main. The 11 Main marketplace hosts merchants in categories such as clothing, fashion accessories and jewelry as well as interior goods and arts and crafts and it plans to keep adding more, said the company. On 23 June 2015, Alibaba announced that it is selling 11 Main to OpenSky, an online-marketplace operator based in New York.

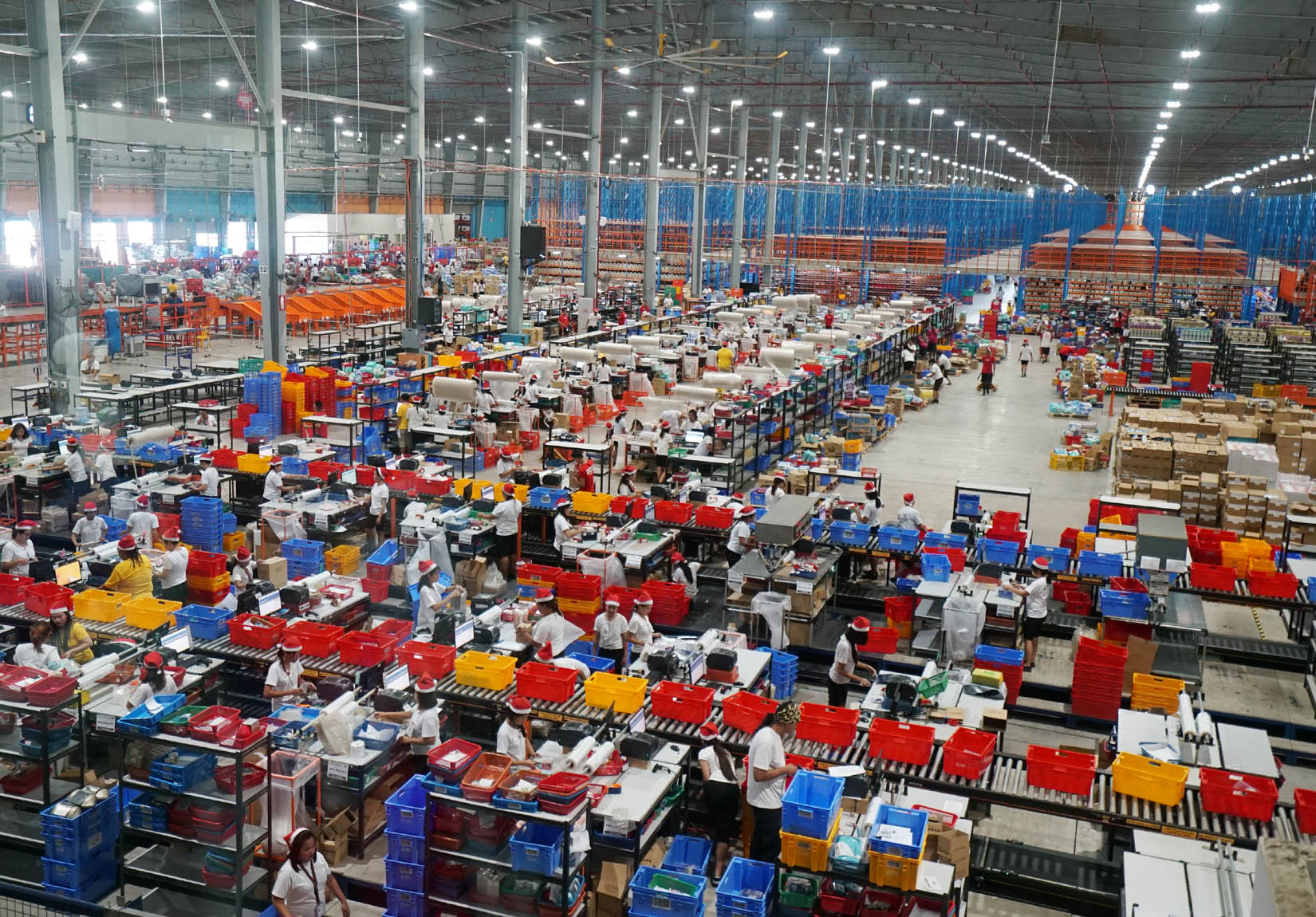
Lazada warehouse in Cabuyao, Laguna, Philippines during the company's 11.11 sale promotion in 2018. Lazada Group is a subsidiary of Alibaba Group and Alibaba co-founder Lucy Peng Lei is CEO of the company.

In February 2015, Alibaba invests US$590 million in Meizu, acquiring an undisclosed minority stake.

In 2016, Alibaba acquired control of Singapore-based e-commerce platform Lazada. Lazada is the largest e-commerce platform in southeast Asia, with a major presence in Malaysia, the Philippines, Singapore, Thailand, and Vietnam. This acquisition increased integration on Alibaba between Chinese merchants and their customers in southeast Asia.

In October 2016, Alibaba launched Alitrip, later named Fliggy, an online travel platform that is designed as an online mall for brands such as airline companies and agencies. Fliggy set the target audience as the younger generation and it strives to become a one-stop service when they plan their trips, particularly in overseas travel. On 7 August 2017, Alibaba Group and Marriott International hotel group announced a comprehensive strategic co-operation. Two companies will set up a joint venture company. Through the docking technology system and the superiority resources, Fliggy has Marriott hotel flagship store. It has the same function with Marriott Chinese website and Marriott mobile app to create the best global travel experience for consumers.

In 2016, the Office of the United States Trade Representative added Taobao back onto a list of notorious counterfeit platforms that includes the likes of torrent site The Pirate Bay. Alibaba denied wrongdoing and filed two lawsuits against the counterfeiters as of 4 January 2017, but brands whose sales have been affected by the counterfeit products accused Alibaba of not doing enough.

In 2017, Alibaba started opening a chain of supermarkets, named Freshippo (or Hema; 盒马), as part of the company's "new retail strategy," where customers can either order in the store or online for delivery in under 30 minutes. It offers a mobile app that recommends customers products based on data analytics. In addition, customers can have their groceries cooked to eat in the food court of the supermarket.

In October 2018, it was reported that Alibaba's Koubei have merged with online food delivery service platform Ele.me into a new local life service subsidiary. However, the newly formed Alibaba Local Life Service entity experienced major competition from local service giant Meituan, which is backed by Tencent, leading to rumours of planned layoffs in 2022.

In September 2019, Alibaba announced it would acquire Chinese e-commerce platform Kaola from NetEase for around US$2 billion. In October 2020, Alibaba agreed to pay US$3.6 billion to take control of China's biggest hypermarket operator Sun Art (SEHK: 6808) from French billionaire Mulliez family. The deal doubled the group's stake in the hypermarket chain with a total ownership of 72%.

==== Gold Supplier membership ====
Alibaba.com offers a paid Gold Supplier membership to try to ensure that each seller is genuine; sellers' Gold Supplier status and the number of years it has been held are displayed. The supplier verification types and checks are listed on Alibaba.com's website, with more stringent checks for sellers outside China. While the majority of suppliers are reported to be genuine, there have been many cases of sellers, some with Gold Supplier status, seeking to defraud unsuspecting buyers. In February 2011, controversy ensued when Alibaba's corporate office admitted that it had granted the mark of integrity of its "China Gold Supplier" program to at least 2,000 dealers that had subsequently defrauded buyers; the firm's share price dropped "abruptly" after the announcement. A statement from the firm reported that Yan Limin, the general manager of Alibaba.com at the time, had been dismissed in March for "misconduct"; Phil Muncaster of UK's The Register additionally reported that "a further 28 employees had been involved in dodgy dealings".

As The Economist noted, the company's response has conflicting components: Alibaba's promulgated view that its corrective actions indicate its commitment to quality and integrity (where it contrasts itself with other scandal-associated Chinese business sectors), versus a damage control view suggesting that the subscription-driven, third-party verified "China Gold Supplier" program was endangered by diminished trust in its endorsement system, removing the incentive for global buyers to choose Alibaba as their business-to-business service, thus more broadly endangering Alibaba through impact on its brand and capabilities (the latter via the "defenestration of senior people"). The scandal was said to have placed the head of Alibaba Group, Jack Ma—who was described as having been furious over the scandal—in a position to personally fight to win back trust.

=== Smart logistics ===
In 2013, Alibaba and six large Chinese logistics companies (including SF Express) established a company called Cainiao for delivery of packages in China. This network gradually grew to 14 local logistics companies in 2014. In 2016, Alibaba's Taobao and Tmall, two of the world's largest and most popular online retail marketplaces, achieved a total transaction volume of 3 trillion yuan (US$478.6 billion). The company aims to double the transaction volume to 6 trillion yuan by 2020. As of February 2018, Taobao reached 580 million monthly active users, while Tmall achieved 500 million monthly active users. It is also rapidly expanding its e-commerce network abroad. Alibaba has also announced that it will invest 100 billion yuan over five years to build a global logistics network, underpinning an aggressive overseas expansion, and demonstrating Alibaba's commitment to building the most efficient logistics network in China and around the world. It is investing a further 5.3 billion yuan in Cainiao Logistics to boost its stake to 51 percent from 47 percent. The investment would value Cainiao, a joint venture of top Chinese logistics firms, at around US$20 billion.

Alibaba uses Cainiao software at its Belgian-European sales hub. The software is able to access data about retailers, products, transport details and flows, a person familiar with the company's IT systems told the British newspaper Financial Times. Chinese companies are legally obliged to pass on their data to China's authorities and security services. The Belgium State Security Service is monitoring the hub in Lütich because of this fact and possible espionage. According to the Financial Times, Cainiao denied suggestions of wrongdoing, noting that the firm operates in compliance with relevant laws and regulations.

According to the Reuters, Alibaba Group Holding Ltd has divested its logistics arm for $8.5 billion to a consortium led by investment firms Boyu Capital and Primavera Capital Group.

=== Cloud computing and artificial intelligence technology ===
In conjunction with the company's 10th anniversary, Alibaba launched Alibaba Cloud in September 2009, aiming to build a cloud computing service platform, including e-commerce data mining, e-commerce data processing, and data customization. It has R&D centres and operators in Hangzhou, Beijing, Hong Kong, Singapore, Silicon Valley and Dubai. In July 2014, Alibaba Cloud entered into a partnership deal with Inspur. Alibaba Cloud is the largest high-end cloud computing company in China. In 2009, Alibaba acquired HiChina, the largest domain registration service and web hosting service company in China, and built it into Alibaba Cloud. On 28 July 2011, Alibaba Cloud released AliOS (formerly Yun OS and Aliyun OS), a Linux distribution designed for mobile devices. In the 2017 Computing Conference in Hangzhou, Alibaba launched AliGenie, a China-based open-platform intelligent personal assistant. It is currently used in the Tmall Genie smart speaker.

In 2018, Alibaba's Wanli Min presented City Brain, a technology geared towards urban solutions such as streamlining traffic, detecting accidents and improving transport efficiency.

China's government designated Alibaba as one of its "AI champions" in 2018.

On 27 July 2019, Alibaba unveiled a 64-bit RISC-V processor called the XuanTie-910 (Black Iron 910). It is a 12 nm 16-core with a clockrate of 2.5 GHz, and was designed by Alibaba's subsidiary T-Head (also known as Pingtouge). Alibaba claim the Xuantie-910 is faster than the ARM Cortex-A73 and is capable of 7.1 Coremark/MHz.

On 25 September 2019, Alibaba announced an AI accelerator called the Hanguang 800. The Hanguang 800 contains 17 billion transistors built with a 12 nm process and was designed by T-Head and DAMO Academy (Alibaba's research institute). Alibaba claim it is capable of 78,563 images per second (IPS) inference and 500 IPS/W in ResNet-50. Alibaba plans to lease Hanguang 800 cloud usage.

In April 2023, Alibaba revealed its plans to release Tongyi Qianwen, a ChatGPT-like chatbot. Its name means "seeking an answer by asking a thousand questions". The company plans use Qwen in various business operations through existing services like DingTalk and Tmall Genie. The company received at least 200,000 requests from various businesses to join its beta testing program. Alibaba is also integrating Tongyi Qianwen into a digital assistant called Tingwu. Tongyi Tingwu, the AI-powered assistant, can analyze multimedia content and generate a text summary from video and audio files.

In November 2024, QwQ-32B-Preview, a model focusing on reasoning similar to OpenAI's o1, was released under the Apache 2.0 License, although only the weights were released, not the dataset or training method. This model, developed by Alibaba's Qwen team, can process prompts up to 32,000 words long and features a unique self-fact-checking mechanism that allows it to solve complex logic puzzles and mathematical problems. The model is not without limitations, as it may unexpectedly switch languages, get stuck in reasoning loops, and struggle with common sense reasoning. Notably, the model is available under an Apache 2.0 license on Hugging Face, making it commercially accessible, though only certain components have been released. Its development comes amid growing skepticism about traditional AI scaling laws and represents a new approach to AI reasoning that involves giving models more processing time to complete tasks.

In April 2025, Alibaba Cloud release Wan 2.1-FLF2V-14B Artificial Intelligence Video Generation Model under Apache license.

==== Surveillance of Uyghurs ====
In December 2020, The New York Times reported that Alibaba had developed and marketed facial recognition and surveillance software configured to detect Uyghur faces and those of other ethnic minorities in China. Alibaba responded that they "do not and will not permit our technology to be used to target or identify specific ethnic groups" and that it was "dismayed to learn" that its Alibaba Cloud subsidiary had developed this feature, defending that the technology was developed "in a testing environment" and that it "was not deployed by any customer." However, IPVM reported in December 2020 that Alibaba refused to provide any proof the Uyghur recognition feature was just a "test" or "trial" and that Alibaba's own website showed Uyghur recognition as a live feature.

=== Entertainment services ===
In September 2017, Alibaba created a new live entertainment business unit under its Digital Media and Entertainment Group which focuses on ticketing, content creation and live experiences, bringing its entertainment ticketing platform Damai and its content creation and technology units MaiLive and Maizuo under one roof. It aims to provide a platform for live events (e.g. concerts, plays, esports and sports events), as well as supporting content partners and leveraging Alibaba's data capability for offline shows. It also provides the online digital distribution service 9Apps, which hosts downloadable content and applications.

In March 2014, Alibaba agreed to acquire a controlling stake in ChinaVision Media Group for $804 million. The two firms announced they would establish a strategic committee for potential future opportunities in online entertainment and other media areas. The company was renamed Alibaba Pictures Group (SEHK: 1060). In March 2015, Alibaba Group launched AliMusic as its music division. Xiami Music and Tiantian Music are two of music streaming APP owned by AliMusic. AliMusic named Gao Xiaosong as the chairman and Song Ke as chief executive officer in July 2015. In 2017, Tencent Music has expected $10bn IPO by signing a rights deal with Alibaba, strengthening its position within the important Chinese market. Under the terms of the deal Alibaba will gain the right to stream music from international labels such as Sony Music, Universal Music Group and YG Entertainment, which already have exclusive deals with Tencent, in return for offering to its catalogue from Rock Records, HIM International Music and so on. In April 2014, Alibaba and Yunfeng Capital, a private equity company controlled by Alibaba's founder, Jack Ma, agreed to acquire a combined 18.5 percent stake in Youku Tudou, which broadcasts a series of popular television programs and other videos over the Internet. Alibaba acquired a stake in Youku Tudou for $1.22 billion in 2014. In its 2023 financial report, Alibaba disclosed a $1.2 billion impairment charge related to losses incurred by Youku.

Since restructuring in March 2023, the Digital Media and Entertainment Group has been led by Fan Luyuan as CEO.

In June 2025, Alibaba Pictures Group officially changed its name to Damai Entertainment Holdings Limited. Its business has expanded from film to a diversified ecosystem including performances, IP commercial derivatives, TV series, artist management, and ticketing platforms.

In April 2026, Alibaba launched an artificial intelligence model for game development and video generation, part of its broader efforts to expand its AI offerings and compete with rivals such as Tencent.

=== Internet services ===
In 2004, the Alibaba Group released Aliwangwang, an instant messaging software service for interactions between customer and online sellers. By 2014, there are 50 million Aliwangwang users, making it the second-largest instant messaging tool in China. In October 2013, the Alibaba's chairman Jack Ma announced that the Alibaba Group would no longer use Tencent's messaging application WeChat, and would henceforth promote its own messaging application and service, Laiwang. In April 2014, Alibaba Group and UCWeb, a Chinese provider of mobile internet software technology and services, launched Shenma (神马), a mobile-only search engine, as part of a joint venture. Later in June, the Alibaba Group acquired UCWeb, with an international product portfolio that includes a mobile browsing service (UC Browser), app and game distribution platforms (9Apps and 9Game), a mobile traffic platform (UC Union) and UC News that primarily caters to all types of news in the India market (as an aggregator) among others. Alibaba's Y Projects Business Unit developed the Xuexi Qiangguo app, which is used to teach Xi Jinping Thought and other aspects of the history and ideology of the Chinese Communist Party.

In 2014, Alibaba Group founded DingTalk, an enterprise communication and collaboration platform. Also known as Ding Ding, the app was developed as part of efforts to compete with rival Tencent's WeChat. DingTalk is managed by Alibaba's cloud computing division.

==== Yahoo! China ====
In October 2005, Alibaba Group formed a strategic partnership with Yahoo! and acquired Yahoo! China, a Chinese portal previously launched on 24 September 1999 that focuses on Internet services like news, email, and search. In 2005, Yahoo Inc. entered into a contract with Alibaba.com for $1 billion cash and gained 35% voting rights as the largest strategic investor. Alibaba also got rights to Yahoo's brand in China and together the entity was managed by Alibaba's chairman at the time Jack Ma. In April 2013, Alibaba Group announced that, as part of the agreement to buy back the Yahoo! Mail stake, that it would suspend technological support for China Yahoo! Mail service and begin migration of Yahoo! China Mail accounts. Several options were offered to users to make the transition as smooth as possible, and Yahoo! China users had four months to migrate their accounts to the Aliyun mail service, the Yahoo! Mail service in the United States, or to another third-party e-mail provider of the user's choice. In August 2013 when users were asked to transfer accounts to Alilbaba's Alimail through a note on their login page. In April it was clear that the closure was part of Yahoo's gradual exit from China since its 2005 stake acquisition in Alibaba. Users with @yahoo.com.cn or @yahoo.cn could migrate all of their data to Alimail and continue receiving emails forwarded to their Yahoo addresses until 31 December 2014. The music service that Yahoo China was offering had already shut down in January 2013. Yahoo! China closed its mail service on 19 August 2013. E-mails sent to Yahoo! China accounts could be forwarded to an Alimail box until 31 December 2014. Users were also allowed to transfer e-mail accounts to yahoo.com or any other e-mail service. It is estimated there are no more than a million users with Yahoo! Mail for China and chances are they also own other e-mail accounts.

=== FinTech and online payment platforms ===
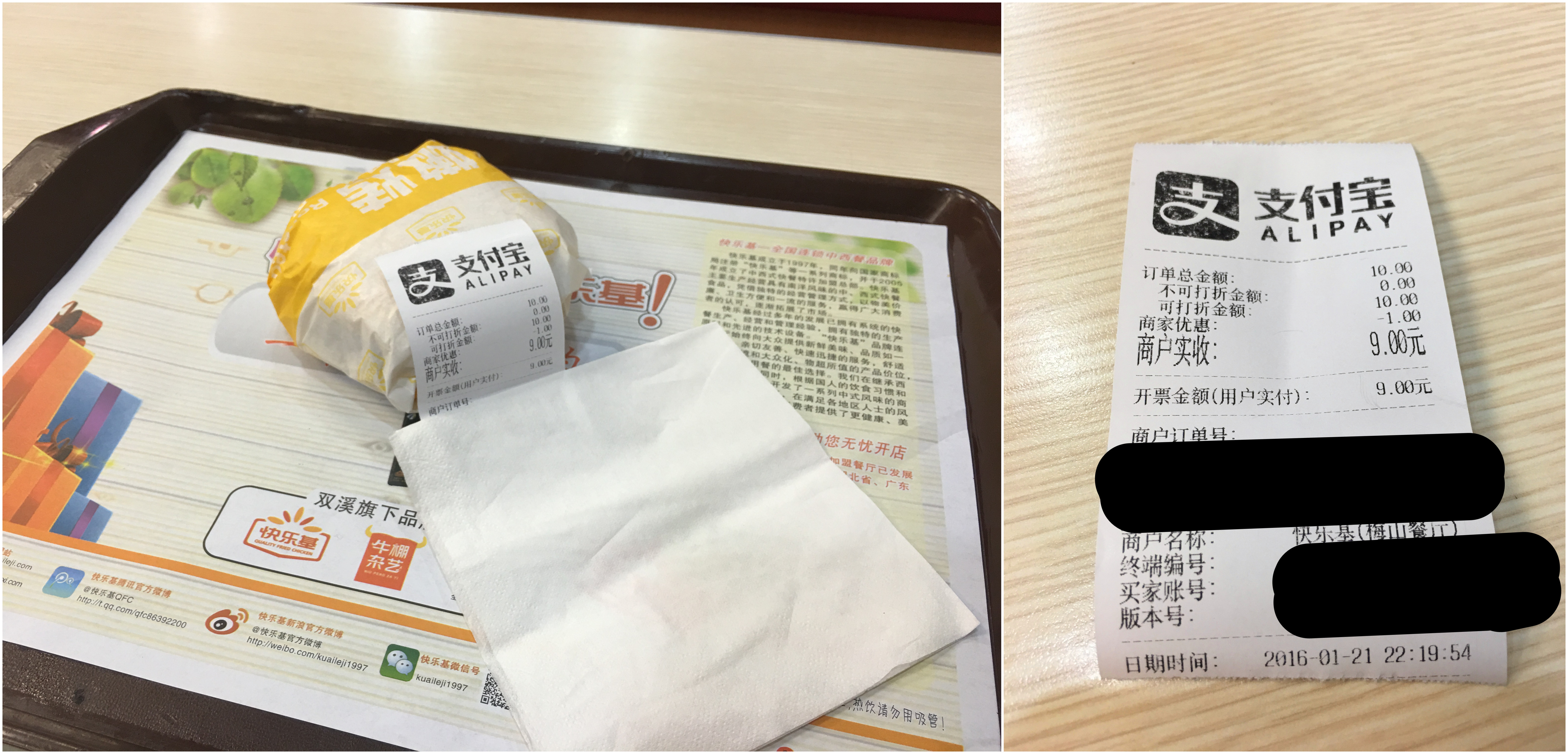
Food ordered with Alipay

In 2004, the Alibaba Group launched Alipay, a third-party online payment platform. It also provides an escrow service, in which buyers can verify whether they are happy with goods they have bought before releasing money to the seller. Prior to Alipay, third-party payment was a legal grey area in China. As Alipay's popularity increased, it became accepted by Chinese regulators. In 2010, the People's Bank of China issued administrative measures regarding non-financial payment services. These measures retroactively recognized the legal status of online third-party payment platforms like Alipay.

Alibaba Group spun off Alipay in 2010 in a controversial move. In 2011, Alipay obtained a license to become one of the first licensed non-financial institutions to conduct payment operations.

According to analyst research report, Alipay has the biggest market share in China with 300 million users and control of just under half of China's online payment market in February 2014.

In 2013, Alipay launched a financial product platform called Yu'ebao (余额宝). Alipay partnered with the Tianhong Asset Management to launch it to the general public. Yu'ebao offers an online money market account in which Alipay customers can deposit money and receive a higher interest rate than that available from banks. It soon became China's largest online money market fund and prompted competitors like Baidu and Tencent to introduce alternatives. The People's Bank of China supported the growth of such funds with a permissive regulatory environment initially but began increasing regulation of such funds in 2017.

On 16 October 2014, the Alipay company was re-branded as Ant Financial Services (now Ant Group).

One of the factors for Alibaba's success in this platform is the company's payment system, which can handle simultaneous transactions with credit card, debit card, Alipay, Quick-pay, and online banking. Ant Financial was ranked sixth in Fortune's Change the World list, recognized for the environmental impact of its Ant Forest, the world's largest platform for tracking individuals' carbon footprints. In 2018, Ant Financial was the highest valued fintech company in the world, and the world's most valuable unicorn (start-up) company, with a valuation of US$150 billion.

In August 2020, Ant Financial, a subsidiary of Alibaba, launched the IPO program, valued at US$200 billion.

In November 2025, Alibaba.com president Kuo Zhang declared publicly the company's plan to explore tokenized deposits denominated in US dollars and Euros for cross-border business payments. The new initiative would use JPMorgan's blockchain-based payment infrastructure to facilitate the movement of digital representations of commercial bank deposits between participating businesses. Unlike privately issued stablecoins, which are backed by reserves held by the issuer, tokenized deposits represent claims on regulated banks and remain linked to existing banking relationships.This was presented to the public as a way to streamline international settlement, reduce reliance on intermediaries, and support faster transactions across Alibaba.com's global marketplace. It would be more like a separate payment method for international trade than cryptocurrency or digital renminbi.

=== Others ===
In 2014, Alibaba and Yunfeng Capital, a private equity firm, launched Alibaba Health when the two companies bought a 54% stake in CITIC 21CN for HK$1.33 billion (US$171 million). It is listed on the Hong Kong Stock Exchange as SEHK: 241. It positions itself as a pharmaceutical e-commerce business and medical services. In the same year, Alibaba acquired Chinese map supplier AutoNavi. In April 2015, the group also reached an agreement to transfer its online B2C pharmacy, Tmall Medical (yao.Tmall.com), to AliHealth. The integration provides consumers a wide range of pharmaceutical and health products available in China. In 2015, Alibaba later launched its Shanghai-based sports division, AliSports, after a consolidation of some of the parent company's existing business units. The new company's operations encompass television and digital sports rights, event operation, venue commercialization, copyright, media, business development, gaming, and ticketing. AliSports secured exclusive title sponsorship of the FIFA Club World Cup from 2015 to 2022. The company announced a Champion of Champions rugby sevens tournament in 2017, to be played in Shanghai for the highest prize money ever offered in the sport.

In December 2015, Alibaba agreed to acquire the South China Morning Post and other media assets belonging to the group for a consideration of $266 million. Although Alibaba promised editorial independence, vice-chairman Joseph Tsai said that Alibaba believes that "the world needs a plurality of views when it comes to China coverage. China's rise as an economic power and its importance to world stability is too important for there to be a singular thesis." The acquisition attracted media concerns over what this would mean for the newspaper's coverage.

Other subsidiaries of Alibaba include Hangzhou Ali Venture Capital and Alibaba Entrepreneurs Fund. Hangzhou Ali Venture Capital (杭州阿里创业投资) is a company 80% owned by Jack Ma and another manager of Alibaba. For regulatory purpose, Alibaba Group did not own the company directly, but by pleading. It was considered as a subsidiary and/or consolidated entity of Alibaba Group. Ali Venture Capital is a shareholder of Beijing Enlight Media and a domestic shareholder of China Unicom. The Alibaba Entrepreneurs Fund is a non-profit making initiative launched by Alibaba Group in 2015.

Alibaba also has invested in more than ten startups in Hong Kong including DayDayCook, GoGoVan, WeLend and Qupital. In 2019, Alibaba launched China-Russia flights in collaboration with Russian Post to assure fast shipping of products.

Alibaba owns the app Feizhu, which is a platform on which companies can sell tourism services such as day trips or cultural activities to Chinese consumers.

When Alibaba acquires shares in other businesses, it generally seeks to acquire a controlling stake and maintain control over the business operations.

== Corporate governance ==
Alibaba's main co-founder Jack Ma served as the executive chairman of the Alibaba Group from its founding until 10 September 2019. Daniel Zhang succeeded Ma and has also served as Alibaba's CEO since 2015. J. Michael Evans has served as Alibaba's president since 2015. Jack Ma had stepped down as CEO in 2013 and chose Jonathan Lu as his successor. The Alibaba Group under Lu was performing well, though there were rumors that Ma was growing distrustful in Lu's ability to lead the company. Daniel Zhang, who served as COO of Alibaba under Lu, succeeded Lu as CEO in 2015. On 10 September 2018, Ma chose Zhang to succeed him as executive chairman of the Alibaba Group after his stepping down announcement, and this would go into effect in 1 year on 10 September 2019.

Since 2012, when Xi Jinping succeeded the CCP general secretary, the Chinese Communist Party (CCP) has had a CCP Committee secretary in place in the company and has over 2,000 party members as Alibaba employees. In September 2019, the municipal government of Hangzhou announced that it was assigning government officials to work with tech companies and manufacturers in Zhejiang province, including Alibaba, in what city officials stated was an effort "to facilitate communication and expedite projects".

After the Russian invasion of Ukraine, Alibaba faced criticism for continuing to do business in Russia. In August 2023, Ukraine's National Agency on Corruption Prevention designated the company an 'international sponsor of war' owing to it providing a platform for the sale of copper goods sourced from the occupied territories of Ukraine.

In 2023, Alibaba Group Holding Ltd has announced Joseph Tsai as the new chairman and Eddie Wu as the CEO. This move comes as the company seeks to revive growth in the post-crackdown era, with Tsai providing strategic direction and Wu driving operational excellence.

=== Ownership ===
Around 44% of Alibaba shares are held by the general public and around 40% are held by institutions. Around 14% are held by SoftBank Group. The largest shareholders in early 2024 were:

- SoftBank Group (11.9%)
- The Vanguard Group (13.39%)
- BlackRock (3.02%)
- Norges Bank (1.99%)
- APN Ltd (1.4%)
- Joseph Tsai (1.31%)
- Pzena Investment Management (1.13%)
- Fidelity International (0.97%)
- State Street Global Advisors (0.93%)
- Fidelity Investments (0.8%)

== Social responsibility ==
In 2014, the Chinese government and Alibaba partnered to create the rural e-commerce expansion program Rural Taobao, which aimed to provide rural households with the same level of access to consumer goods that urban residents have and to facilitate the sale of agricultural goods through e-commerce. As of 2017, the program covered 16,500 villages.

Beginning in March 2016, Alibaba and the Communist Youth League began a collaboration to promote online entrepreneurship among rural Chinese youth. Later that year, Alibaba signed other rural development agreements with the National Development and Reform Commission and Ministry of Agriculture.

In May 2017, Alibaba signed a memorandum with the Supreme People's Procuratorate's Anti-Corruption Bureau "to create a clean, credible, rule-of-law market environment." Pursuant to the memorandum, the Bureau provides Alibaba and Ant Group with access to criminal records from bribery cases and Alibaba and Ant Group query those records including during verification of Taobao sellers and in connection with anti-money laundering initiatives and financial risk controls.

Alibaba actively promotes female employment, collaborating with the All-China Women's Federation for community e-commerce events. The company also donates to UN Women to support female employment initiatives. Half of Alibaba's employees are women, with one-third of leadership roles, especially in departments like human resources, held by women.

Alibaba collaborates with Hangzhou's smart city initiative and efforts to digitize the economy and build a cashless city.

== See also ==
- Variable interest entity
- Amazon
