= Appraisal rights =

Rights of shareholders to receive valuation of shares

Appraisal rights, also called dissent rights or buy-out rights, among other variants, are the rights of shareholders to receive a court-supervised valuation of their shares when certain major changes, such as an acquisition of the company, are contemplated. Shareholders who do not support the transaction are entitled to receive the value of their shares in cash, as determined by the court. Appraisal rights are available in jurisdictions including Canada, the United Kingdom, and the United States.

== Canada ==
The Canada Business Corporations Act (CBCA) and analogous provincial corporation statutes confer appraisal rights on minority shareholders when the following changes to the corporation are proposed: certain amendments to a company's articles of incorporation; an amalgamation, or merger; moving the corporation to another jurisdiction, which is called a "continuance"; selling all or almost all of the corporation's assets; and going private or squeeze-out transactions. Shareholders who wish to exercise their appraisal rights must follow a detailed procedure set out in the statute. Appraisal rights under the CBCA entitle shareholders to the "fair value" of their shares, but fair value need not be identical to fair market value. Amendments guaranteeing appraisal rights were first added to the CBCA in 1975; Ontario legislation had provided them at least since the 1950s.

== United Kingdom ==
Appraisal rights are limited in United Kingdom company law. The Insolvency Act 1986 gives minority shareholders appraisal rights when liquidation of the company is contemplated. The Companies Act 2006 and The Takeover Code also provide appraisal rights when a buyer is set to acquire a controlling stake in the company.

== United States ==
Corporate law statutes in all US states provide appraisal rights to minority shareholders when some kinds of transactions are contemplated. The kinds of transactions that trigger appraisal rights vary from state to state. Minority shareholders who exercise their appraisal rights are entitled to a court-supervised valuation of their shares, after which the company must buy their shares at that value. Generally, under American state law, shareholders only have appraisal rights if their shares carry the right to vote on matters affecting the company. Another exception applies to public companies: since there is a wide market for public company shares, shareholders can sell their shares on a stock exchange and do not need a court-sanctioned valuation.

Appraisal rights entitle dissenting minority shareholders to receive the court-determined fair value of their shares instead of participating in the transaction. However, since by hypothesis they do not support the contemplated transaction, they are not entitled to any additional per-share value that might result from the transaction itself. Some transactions impose a condition precedent that ends the transaction if enough shareholders exercise their appraisal rights.

Many large US companies are incorporated in Delaware, which gives its corporate law a disproportionately large influence. Under the Delaware General Corporation Law, appraisal rights are only available in some kinds of mergers; other states, which are entitled under American law to create and regulate corporations, confer them in a broader set of circumstances, such as in asset purchases. According to the Delaware courts, the appraisal remedy was created as a benefit to minority shareholders after the Delaware legislature removed the requirement that a merger must be unanimously approved to be effective. Many contemporary appraisal cases in Delaware are started by minority shareholders who believe that the proposed merger values their shares too low. Although Delaware law generally limits appraisal rights when a merger of two public companies is proposed, that limit does not apply when shareholders will receive cash (as opposed, for example, to shares) as consideration for the merger. This exception often triggers appraisal rights for shareholders in Delaware-incorporated public companies.

== Works cited ==
- Cleveland, Steven J. (2022). "Appraisal Rights and 'Fair Value'". Cardozo Law Review. 43 (3): 921–967. ISSN 0270-5192.
- Fisch, Jill E. (2022). "A Lesson from Startups: Contracting Out of Shareholder Appraisal". Iowa Law Review. 107 (3): 941–986. ISSN 0021-0552.
- Jiang, Wei; Li, Tao; Thomas, Randall (December 2020). "The Long Rise and Quick Fall of Appraisal Arbitrage" (PDF). Boston University Law Review. 100 (6): 2133–2177. ISSN 0006-8047.
- MacIntosh, Jeffrey (April 1986). "The Shareholders' Appraisal Right in Canada: A Critical Reappraisal". Osgoode Hall Law Journal. 24 (2): 201–298. ISSN 0030-6185.
- Oesterle, Dale A. (2006). Mergers and Acquisitions in a Nutshell (2d ed.). West. ISBN 0-314-15956-8. OCLC 63788295.
- VanDuzer, J. Anthony (22 August 2018). The Law of Partnerships and Corporations (4th ed.). Irwin Law. pp. 501–505. ISBN 978-1-55221-468-8. OCLC 1050447721.
