= Baopals =

Online shopping platform based in Shanghai, China

- Company type: Privately held company
- Website type: Online shopping
- Founded: July 2015; 11 years ago Shanghai, China
- Headquarters: Shanghai, {{{location_country}}}
- Area served: China
- Founders: Charles Erickson; Jay Thornhill; Tyler McNew
- Key people: Charles Erickson (Head of Business Development); Jay Thornhill (Head of Product Development), Tyler McNew (Head of Tech Development)
- Website: www.baopals.com
- Launched: February 2016

Baopals is an online shopping platform based in Shanghai, China, that enables users to shop from Taobao, Tmall and Jingdong (JD) in English. The platform serves as a bridge to products and sellers from these Chinese platforms, with information updated in real-time and translated to English. Product organization, customer service, payment, and delivery are geared towards non-Chinese users. The platform is accessible online as well through the company's official WeChat service account.

The platform organizes products into departments and subcategories, and features positively reviewed and trending products throughout the website and blog articles. Baopals currently operates out of the Jing'an District of Shanghai, with an office dog named Doge who was pictured in an article from China Daily about the benefits of having pets in the workplace.

In October 2017, Baopals was the first foreign team to receive honors and win the “Top 10 Up-and-Coming Entrepreneurs in Shanghai” award — one of the longest running startup contests in the city held by the Shanghai Human Resources and Social Security Bureau.

In a 2018 interview with CNBC, Baopals reported that over 2 million items had been sold on the platform, with a gross merchandise value of over US$14 million.

Baopals began shipping internationally to regions outside of China in August 2021, and currently ships to over 40 regions throughout Asia, Australia, Europe and North America.

According to the company as of November 2022, 5.8 million items have been sold on Baopals, with a gross merchandise value of US$53 million.

== History ==
Baopals was founded in Shanghai, China. After seven months of development, the platform opened to beta users in February 2016.

In an interview with China Daily, Charles Erickson said:

The idea was born out of necessity from all of us. I was always asking my Chinese colleagues to help me buy things on Taobao. So, we just wanted to figure out a way to do this independently.

On the company's tech platform, Jay Thornhill said:

[People may] think that we’re hand selecting products from Taobao and Tmall, but our tech actually bridges everything over from Taobao and Tmall automatically, in real time. So all the products and sellers are there.

In 2017, Baopals was the winner of the OTEC International Startup Competition and Shanghai Innovation and Startup Competition. According to a profile on Baopals from China Daily, approximately 25 percent of Baopals customers are based in Shanghai, 20 percent in Beijing, 13 percent in Guangdong, and the rest flow from other parts of China.

In August 2021 the company opened up shipping to the United States. In July 2022, the company added shipping options to Australia, Canada, Hong Kong, Macau, Malaysia, Singapore, Thailand and Vietnam. In October 2022 they began shipping to over 25 regions in Europe.

== Recognition ==
After launching in February 2016, Baopals was featured by local media in Shanghai. That's Shanghai wrote: "Worry no more, because Baopals was tailor-made for you. Is it Taobao translated into English? Well, yes, but you could just as easily do that on your browser. What Baopals does instead is reconfigure the interface, making it sleek and approachable, and compartmentalizing all that miscellanea into 16 categories. Game status: changed."

In April, City Weekend (Shanghai) published a piece on Baopals, saying, "At long, long last: shopping start-up Baopals has cracked the world of Taobao and Tmall wide open for the expat community. Translating the treasure trove of these products into English would have been enough, but the company also offers phenomenally easy delivery and payment options that reflect the gradually opening Chinese market in which us expats participate on a daily basis. Unlike existing concierge services that act more as middlemen, the Baopals team wanted to provide a more independent shopping experience."

In the following months Baopals was featured on the front page of Tech Crunch media partner TechNode, who wrote: "While a handful of expat entrepreneurs try to bring innovation from their country to China, this startup builds on the success of one of China’s largest companies and adapts it to expat tastes."

An article published in March 2017 by City Weekend (Beijing) referred to the platform as "...a solution for those of us illiterate in Chinese." A photo essay published in August by China Daily quoted Charles Erickson as saying, "When you return to the west, you realize that opportunities are still in China".

In August 2017, 海豚视频 (Dolphin Video) published a comedic video filmed at the Baopals office and co-founder's home outlining the history of the company and some of the crazier products available for purchase of the platform. Within the first 12 hours of publication the video received over 1 million views, peaking at 1.95 million two days later. Two more short videos were produced by Pear Video at the end of 2017, documenting and interviewing the Baopals cofounders as they attended an awards ceremony, worked in the office, exercised at the gym, and ate at a Chinese restaurant.

Comedy series Mamahuhu featured a Baopals employee in a 2019 video titled "Average Day of a Chinese Office Worker in Shanghai." The video team followed Li Yi Xuan and her daily routine, with a look inside the Baopals headquarters on the day following the Singles' Day sale.
