= 2007 NBA betting scandal =

Betting scandal in the National Basketball Association in 2007

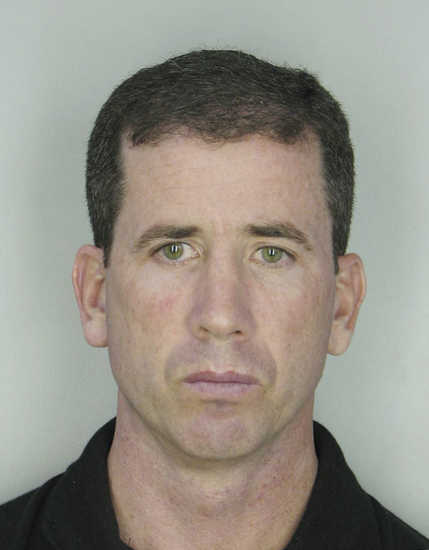
Tim Donaghy

The 2007 NBA betting scandal was a scandal involving the National Basketball Association (NBA) and accusations that an NBA referee used his knowledge of relationships between referees, coaches, players and owners to bet on professional basketball games. In July 2007, reports of an investigation by the Federal Bureau of Investigation (FBI) were made public, which alleged that during the 2005–06 and 2006–07 NBA seasons, referee Tim Donaghy bet on games in which he officiated. Donaghy later admitted to betting on games he officiated in each of the 2003–04, 2004–05, 2005–06, and 2006–07 seasons.

Donaghy has claimed that instead of using his position as an on-court referee to advance his bets, he exploited his insider knowledge to wager on NBA games, regardless of whether he was officiating them. However, some of Donaghy's co-conspirators cooperated with the government and claimed that they only became involved because Donaghy offered a high win rate on the games which he officiated. Similarly, Donaghy's best friend, Tommy Martino, noted that during most of the scandal's four-year span, Donaghy only offered bets on games which he officiated. Furthermore, Donaghy's betting predictions for the outcomes of games which he did not officiate were typically incorrect, so the co-conspirators generally avoided placing bets on such matches. Researchers with access to Donaghy's offshore betting accounts, electronic betting records, and betting line data have demonstrated that most of the betting activity involved games officiated by Donaghy.

On August 15, 2007, Donaghy pleaded guilty to two federal charges related to the investigation. In 2008, he was sentenced to 15 months in prison and three years of supervised release.

== Initial report ==
The story first broke when the New York Post reported that the FBI was investigating allegations that an NBA referee had bet on games. The story was soon picked up by other major news agencies, as it was revealed that Donaghy was the referee under investigation. The reports claimed that Donaghy had started betting on games in 2005, and had connections to organized crime. Reporters, especially those who worked crime beats and who had quality law enforcement and "street" sources, soon discounted the supposed involvement of the mob in the scandal, however.

The day after the initial reports, NBA commissioner David Stern said that "no amount of effort, time or personnel is being spared to assist in this investigation, to bring to justice an individual who has betrayed the most sacred trust in professional sports, and to take the necessary steps to protect against this ever happening again." He then held a press conference on July 24 to address questions about the investigation. Although he called the Donaghy matter "an isolated case," he also said it was "the most serious situation and worst situation that I have ever experienced."

On July 27, U.S. Congressman Bobby Rush of Illinois, chairman of the Energy and Commerce Commerce, Trade and Consumer Protection Subcommittee, asked to meet with Stern regarding the Donaghy matter. In a letter to Stern, Rush indicated that he might call a hearing "should the facts warrant public scrutiny." He also said that the affair could potentially be "one of the most damaging scandals in the history of American sports." On the same day, it was reported that a high school classmate of Donaghy's, and the classmate's boss, had bet on NBA games based on Donaghy's tips. Donaghy later revealed that he was rewarded $2,000 cash for each correct pick based on the tips he would pass along. It was further learned Donaghy's pay was increased from $2,000 per correct pick to $5,000 after the first few games of the 2006-07 portion of the 4-season scandal.

=== Surrender ===
After the initial reports, Donaghy stayed at his home, before moving to a secure location to avoid media scrutiny. He surrendered on August 15, 2007, and pleaded guilty to two felony charges of conspiracy. He told judges that he had used coded language to tip others about players' physical condition and player/referee relations, and he specifically admitted to passing information about two games during the 2006–07 season. In total, Donaghy claimed he received $30,000 to pass inside information to bookies. Donaghy's co-conspirators disputed his accounting, with his best friend and fellow government cooperator Tommy Martino claiming Donaghy was paid $120,000 between December 2006 and April 2007 and pro gambler Jimmy Battista claiming he paid Donaghy between $201,000 and $209,000. Donaghy also claimed that he had a severe gambling addiction, and was on medication to address it. He was released on a $250,000 bond.

=== Allegations of improper playoff refereeing ===
On June 11, 2008, Donaghy alleged in a statement through his lawyers that several series in the NBA Playoffs had been improperly refereed and that this happened at the instruction of the NBA. He alluded specifically to a playoff game where "personal fouls [resulting in obviously injured players] were ignored even when they occurred in full view of the referees" because "it was in the NBA's interest to add another game to the series." The game referred to was widely believed to be Game 6 of the 2002 Western Conference Finals between the Los Angeles Lakers and the Sacramento Kings, in which the Lakers shot 27 free throws in the fourth quarter. Donaghy also referred to a playoff series where "Team 3's Owner alleged that referees were letting a Team 4 player get away with illegal screens. NBA Executive Y told Referee Supervisor Z that the referees for that game were to enforce the screening rules strictly against that Team 4 player." The playoff series was believed to be the first-round encounter between the Houston Rockets and the Dallas Mavericks in the 2005 NBA Playoffs. The Rockets led 2–0 in the series before losing in 7 games, and then-Rockets head coach Jeff Van Gundy was fined $100,000 for stating that a referee was targeting Houston center Yao Ming. Federal authorities investigated Donaghy's claims and found no evidence to support them. About this, AUSA Jeffrey Goldberg told the court, "we've never taken the position that Mr. Donaghy has lied to us. But there is a difference between telling the truth and believing you're telling the truth and finding out later that a number of the allegations don't hold any water."

== Sentencing ==
On July 29, 2008, Donaghy was sentenced to 15 months in prison, and three years of supervised release. Although his lawyer asked for a probationary sentence, Donaghy admitted that he had "brought shame on myself, my family and the profession." Judge Carol Bagley Amon noted she held Donaghy "more culpable" in the business "arrangement" than his two co-conspirators and added, "Without Mr. Donaghy, there was no scheme."

Donaghy was released from federal prison on November 4, 2009. Before being released he wrote a tell all book on himself and the NBA titled Personal Foul: A First-Person Account of the Scandal That Rocked the NBA. Many of the key claims Donaghy makes in the book and in related appearances have been debunked with evidence. Some of the main falsehoods debunked concern specifics about the NBA (e.g., game outcomes, related player stats) and especially about the scandal itself (e.g., the origin of the scandal, allegations of organized crime involvement and threats, which games were bet, the sociology of the betting, how the scandal ended) along other vital issues pertaining to the FBI's investigation, the government's prosecution, and the sentencing judge's assessment of his actions. Donaghy was released to the supervision of federal parole-type officer.

== Reaction ==
Immediately after the reports were released, several writers said that the NBA's popularity would be hurt by the news. Chris Sheridan of ESPN said that "the general American public has been turning away since the end of the Bulls' dynasty, and this fiasco isn't going to help bring it back," and J. A. Adande said that "the integrity of the games just took a major hit."

Sports gambling expert R. J. Bell, president of sports betting information site Pregame.com, tracked every game Donaghy worked from 2003 to 2007. He discovered that during the two seasons investigated by the NBA, the teams involved scored more points than expected by the Las Vegas sports books 57 percent of the time. In the previous two seasons, this only happened 44 percent of the time. According to Bell, the odds of such a discrepancy are 1 in 1,000, and there was "a 99.9 percent chance that these results would not have happened without an outside factor." He also found 10 straight games in 2007 in which Donaghy worked where the point spread moved 1.5 points or more before the tip — an indication that big money had been wagered on the game. The big money won every time — another indication that "something [was] going on." However, Bell suggested that there was no way anyone who was not in on the fix could have known that something was amiss about Donaghy's actions during a game; he said it would have been another year at the earliest before anyone could have caught on.

Handicapper Brandon Lang told ESPN that it is fairly easy for a crooked sports official to fix a game, despite Stern's insistence that Donaghy was a "rogue official." According to Lang, an official can directly influence the outcome of a game 75 percent of the time if he has money on the game. For instance, Lang said that a crooked NBA referee can fix the total score by calling enough fouls to get both teams in the bonus. When a game is being fixed, Lang said, the officials should be the prime suspects because the players are making too much money to risk their future. Lang also believed a bookie connected to the mob turned Donaghy in to the FBI.

As a result of the betting scandal, Stern revised the guidelines on the behavior of NBA referees during the Board of Governors' meeting in 2007. Despite the labor agreement for referees, which restricted them from participating in almost all forms of gambling, it was revealed that about half of the NBA's officials had made bets in casinos, albeit not with sportsbooks. In addition, almost all referees had admitted to engaging in some form of gambling. Stern stated that "[the] ban on gambling is absolute, and in my view it is too absolute, too harsh and was not particularly well-enforced over the years." The gambling rules were revised to allow referees to engage in several forms of betting — though not on sports. There were several other referee-related rule changes made: the announcement of referees of a game was moved from 90 minutes before tip-off to the morning of the game, to reduce the value of the information to gamblers; referees received more in-season training and counseling on gambling; more thorough background checks were carried out; the league declared its intention to analyze the statistical relationship between NBA games and referees' gambling patterns for those games; and the interactions between referees and NBA teams were made easier and more formal.

== See also ==
- Inside Game (2019 film)
- National Basketball Association criticisms and controversies
