= Eric Mabius =

American actor (born 1971)

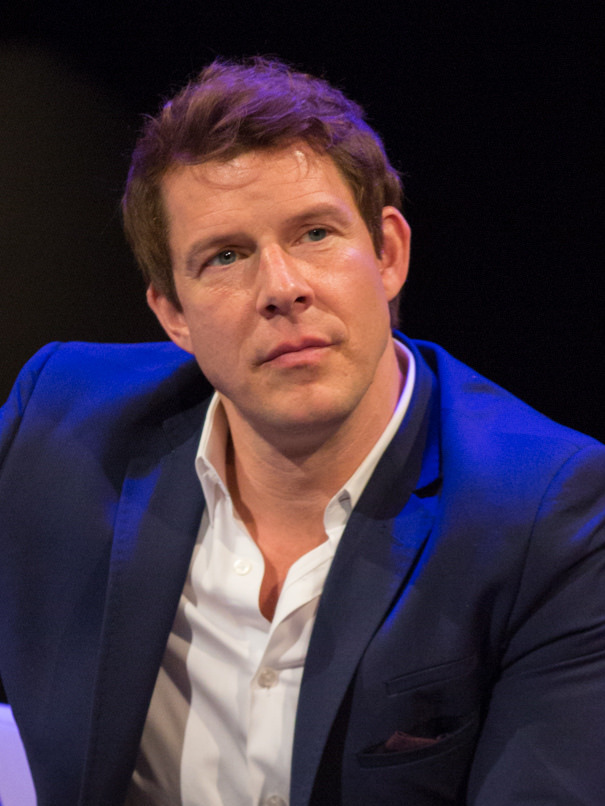
- Mabius in 2016
- Born: Eric Harry Timothy Mabius; April 22, 1971 (age 55); Harrisburg, Pennsylvania, U.S.
- Education: Sarah Lawrence College
- Occupation: Actor
- Years active: 1995–present
- Spouse: Ivy Sherman (m. 2006; div. 2018)
- Children: 2

Eric Harry Timothy Mabius (born April 22, 1971) is an American actor. Born in Harrisburg, Pennsylvania, he graduated from Sarah Lawrence College in Bronxville, New York, with a degree in cinema studies. After working in theater productions, Mabius made his film debut in the 1995 independent dark comedy Welcome to the Dollhouse.

Mabius gained widespread recognition for his role as Daniel Meade on the ABC comedy-drama series Ugly Betty. He also appeared on the Showtime series The L Word and in the films Cruel Intentions, The Crow: Salvation, and Resident Evil. Since 2013, Mabius has starred in the long-running Hallmark Channel series Signed, Sealed, Delivered.

== Personal life ==
Mabius was born in Harrisburg, Pennsylvania, the son of Elizabeth (née Dziczek) and Craig Mabius. His father worked as a historian preserving the Historic Allaire Village. He has a brother, Craig. Mabius is Roman Catholic. After attending Amherst Regional High School in Amherst, Massachusetts, where he was voted "Most Dramatic Guy" as a senior, he enrolled in Sarah Lawrence College in Yonkers, New York, where he pursued his education in film theory.

Mabius wed Ivy Sherman, an interior designer, in January 2006; the two first met in high school during a health education class. They divorced in 2018.

Mabius was arrested in Nassau County, Florida, on February 20, 2025, and charged with battery and resisting law enforcement without violence. All charges were dropped.

== Career ==
Mabius began his film career with supporting roles in Welcome to the Dollhouse (1995), I Shot Andy Warhol (1996), and his first leading role was in Black Circle Boys (1997). Also in 1997, Mabius had a supporting role in the film Lawn Dogs. He was involved with The Crow superhero franchise on more than one occasion: he auditioned for a role as one of Top Dollar's henchmen in the 1994 original The Crow and played Alex Corvis in The Crow: Salvation (2000), the third installment, opposite Kirsten Dunst. In 1999, he had supporting roles in The Minus Man, Splendor, and then the box office hit Cruel Intentions, which starred Reese Witherspoon, Sarah Michelle Gellar, and Ryan Phillippe. He also played an activist named Matt Addison in 2002's Resident Evil.

In television, Mabius has appeared on Chicago Hope, Millennium, Popular, The O.C., and the short-lived series Eyes (2005). He was a regular cast member of The L Word in its first season and returned for one episode in each of the second, third, and sixth seasons, portraying Tim Haspel. He also guest-starred on an episode of CSI: Miami. From 2006 to 2010, he starred as fashion magazine editor Daniel Meade on the ABC dramedy series Ugly Betty. After the success of Ugly Betty, he was included on People magazine's "Sexiest Men Alive" list in 2006. Mabius also appeared in the 2006 Lifetime original film A Christmas Wedding, and had a leading role in the 2011 British science-fiction drama series Outcasts.

In 2013, Mabius guest-starred in a season 2 episode of Scandal. The same year he was cast as the lead in Hallmark Channel's Signed, Sealed, Delivered film series.

== Honors ==
Mabius competed as a luger in the late 1980s and was named an honorary captain for the US luge team for the 2010 Winter Olympics along with astronaut Scott Parazynski.

== Filmography ==
=== Film ===
Year	Title	Role	Notes
1995	Welcome to the Dollhouse	Steve Rodgers	
1995	The Journey of August King	Hal Wright	
1996	I Shot Andy Warhol	Revolutionary no. 2	
1997	Black Circle Boys	Shane Carver	
1997	A Gun for Jennifer	Bar patron 2 / Clyde's sidekick	
1997	Lawn Dogs	Sean Torrance	
1998	Around the Fire	Andrew	
1998	Myth America	—N/a	
1999	The Minus Man	Gene	
1999	Splendor	Ernest	
1999	Cruel Intentions	Greg McConnell	
2000	Wirey Spindell	Wirey, age 17	
2000	The Crow: Salvation	Alex Corvis / The Crow	
2001	Tempted	Ted	
2001	On the Borderline	Luke	
2002	Resident Evil	Matt Addison	
2003	Just Like You Imagined	Gender Shifter	Short film
2003	The Extreme Team	Darby	
2003	The Job	Rick	
2004	Resident Evil: Apocalypse	Matt Addison	Archive footage
2005	Venice Underground	Danny	
2005	Reeker	Radford	
2011	Where the Road Meets the Sun	Blake	
2012	Price Check	Pete Cozy	
2013	Amazing	Frank Miller	
2019	Inside Game	Tim Donaghy	

=== Television ===
Year	Title	Role	Notes
1996	Harvest of Fire	Sam Hostetler	Television film
1996	On Seventh Avenue	Bass player	Television film
1997	Chicago Hope	Zeb Moser	Episode: "...And the Hand Played On"
1999	Millennium	Samiel	Episode: "Borrowed Time"
1999	Party of Five	Brian Stilman	2 episodes
2000	Get Real	Andrew Clark	Episode: "Guilt"
2000	Popular	Coach Casey Krupps	Episode: "The Sweetest Taboo"
2002	Dancing at the Harvest Moon	John Keats Fleming	Television film
2003	Fastlane	Trey	Episode: "Dogtown"
2004–2006, 2009	The L Word	Tim Haspel	16 episodes
2005	Eyes	Jeff McCann	Main cast; 10 episodes
2005	The O.C.	Dean Jack Hess	4 episodes
2006	CSI: Miami	FBI Agent Perry	Episode: "One of Our Own"
2006	Voodoo Moon	Cole	Television film
2006–2010	Ugly Betty	Daniel Meade	Main cast; 85 episodes
2006	A Christmas Wedding	Ben	Television film
2007	Nature of the Beast	Donovan	Television film
2011	Outcasts	Julius Berger	Main cast; 8 episodes
2011	Chase	Justin Tate	Episode: "Father Figure"
2011	Celebrity Ghost Stories	Himself	Episode: "Mickey Rooney/Eric Mabius/Brande Roderick/Kim Coles"
2012	The Client List	Ray	Episode: "Acting Up"
2012	Franklin & Bash	Rossi	Episode: "Jango and Rossi"
2012	How to Fall in Love (also called, The Dating Coach)	Harold White	Television film
2012	Political Animals	Gary	Miniseries; episode: "Second Time Around"
2012	The Haunting of...	Himself	Episode: "Eric Mabius"
2013	Scandal	Peter Caldwell	Episode: "Boom Goes the Dynamite"
2013	Blue Bloods	Richard Rorke	Episode: "Quid Pro Quo"
2013	Reading, Writing & Romance	Wayne Wenders	Television film
2013–2018; 2021; 2024; 2025	Signed, Sealed, Delivered	Oliver O'Toole	Main cast; 10 episodes and 15 television films
2015	Chicago Fire	Jack Nesbitt	7 episodes
2018	Welcome to Christmas	Gage McBride	Hallmark Television Film
2019	It's Beginning to Look a Lot Like Christmas	Liam Clark	Hallmark Television Film
2022	Haul Out the Holly	Alan	Hallmark Television Film
2023	Haul Out the Holly: Lit Up	Alan	Hallmark Television Film

== Awards and nominations ==
Year	Award	Category	Work	Result
2007	Screen Actors Guild Award	Outstanding Performance by an Ensemble in a Comedy Series	Ugly Betty	Nominated
2008	Screen Actors Guild Award	Outstanding Performance by an Ensemble in a Comedy Series	Ugly Betty	Nominated
2008	PRISM Awards	Performance in a Comedy Series	Ugly Betty	Nominated
2011	Los Angeles Asian Pacific Film Festival	Special Jury Prize: Best Ensemble	Where the Road Meets the Sun	Won
