= NBA brawl =

NBA brawl may refer to:

- The Pacers–Pistons brawl on November 19, 2004
- The Knicks–Nuggets brawl on December 16, 2006

== See also ==
- National Basketball Association criticisms and controversies
