= Taobao =

Chinese website for online shopping

- Website type: Consumer-to-consumer and E-commerce
- Available in: Chinese
- Owner: Alibaba Group
- Website: www.taobao.com
- Commercial: Yes
- Launched: May 2003
- Current status: Active
- Written in: PHP

Taobao
- "Taobao" in Simplified (top) and Traditional (bottom) Chinese characters
- Simplified Chinese: 淘宝
- Traditional Chinese: 淘寶
- Literal meaning: search for treasure
Transcriptions
Standard Mandarin
- Hanyu Pinyin: Táobǎo
- Bopomofo: ㄊㄠˊ ㄅㄠˇ
- Wade–Giles: T'ao^{2}-pao^{3}
- Tongyong Pinyin: Táo-bǎo
- IPA: [tʰǎʊ.pàʊ]
Yue: Cantonese
- Yale Romanization: Tòuh-bóu
- Jyutping: tou4 bou2
- IPA: [tʰɔw˩.pɔw˧˥]
Southern Min
- Tâi-lô: Tô-pó

Taobao (simplified Chinese: 淘宝; traditional Chinese: 淘寶) is a Chinese online shopping platform. It is headquartered in Hangzhou and is owned by Alibaba. According to Alexa rank, it was the eighth most-visited website globally in 2021. Taobao.com was registered on April 21, 2003 by Alibaba Cloud Computing (Beijing) Co., Ltd.

Taobao Marketplace facilitates consumer-to-consumer retail by providing a platform for small businesses and individual entrepreneurs to open online stores that mainly cater to consumers in Chinese-speaking regions (Mainland China, Hong Kong, Macau and Taiwan) and abroad, which is made payable by online accounts. Its stores usually offer an express delivery service.

Sellers are able to post goods for sale either through a fixed price or an auction. Auctions make up a small percentage of transactions, whereas the majority of the products are new merchandise sold at fixed prices. Taobao users usually read feedback and compare items from multiple shops. Taobao's popular payment platform is Alibaba's Alipay.

As of at least 2024, it is the world's most popular shopping hub as measured by gross merchandise value.

== History ==
Before its launch of Taobao, Alibaba had focused on online business-to-business wholesale sales.

In 2003, eBay acquired Eachnet, China's online auction leader at the time, for US$180 million. It became a major contender in the Chinese consumer e-commerce market.

Responding to eBay's moves, Alibaba launched Taobao as a rival consumer-to-consumer platform. To counter eBay's expansion, Taobao offered free listings to sellers. It introduced instant messaging for facilitating buyer-seller communication and an escrow-based payment tool: Alipay. Taobao's focus on institutional trust building mechanisms like escrowing payments became a major reason for its success in the market for eBay, despite eBay's first-mover advantage. Taobao became mainland China's market leader within two years. Its market share grew from 8% to 59% between 2003 and 2005, while eBay China dropped from 79% to 36%. eBay shut down its Chinese site in 2006.

In 2008, Taobao established a platform rule providing that customers had the right to return clothes sold on the platform within seven days of receipt without cause, and subsequently expanded the rule to cover other commodities. This rule became an influential standard in Chinese e-commerce and in 2014 was made an industry standard through the State Administration for Industry and Commerce's Administrative Measures for Online Trading.

In October 2010, Taobao beta-launched eTao as an independent search engine for online shopping to provide and merchant information from a number of major consumer e-commerce websites in China. Online shoppers would be able to use the site to compare prices across sellers. According to the Alibaba Group web site, eTao offers products from Amazon China, Dangdang, Gome, Yihaodian, Nike China and Vancl, as well as Taobao and Tmall.

In June 2011, Jack Ma, executive chairman and former chief executive officer of Alibaba Group, announced that Taobao would split into three different companies: Taobao Marketplace (a consumer-to-consumer platform), Tmall.com (a business-to consumer platform, then called Taobao Mall), and eTao (a search engine for online shopping). The move was said to be necessary for Taobao to “meet competitive threats that emerged in the past two years during which the Internet and e-commerce landscape has changed dramatically.” In 2011, Kuo Zhang, who is now the President of Alibaba.com, worked on merchant-platform tools for the company's domestic consumer marketplaces, Taobao and Tmall, before moving to lead the B2B unit. Under his leadership, Alibaba.com shifted from a supplier directory toward a transactional platform with integrated payments, logistics, and AI-driven sourcing tools and features. Currently, his role is specific to the B2B arm and was not a direct outcome of the restructuring in 2011. In recent years, he has publicly emphasized AI agents and automation to help small businesses and solo entrepreneurs operate globally, including through products such as Accio Work.

In 2012, Taobao began to accept international Visa and MasterCard credit and debit cards.

On April 29, 2013, Alibaba announced an investment of US$586 million in Sina Weibo. According to Reuters, the deal "should drive more web traffic to Alibaba's Taobao Marketplace". On August 1, 2013, Alibaba launched Weibo for Taobao, which allows users to link Sina Weibo accounts with Taobao accounts.

In addition to hosting individuals and businesses, Taobao includes online stores for courts, customs offices, state-owned banks, and asset management companies selling distressed assets. By early 2014, more than 500 local Chinese courts had established Taobao store fronts to sell seized property, including property which had been confiscated as part of the anti-corruption campaign under Xi Jinping.

In 2016, Alibaba launched the Taobao Maker Festival to display creative products and designs from Taobao merchants. The festival provides a platform for young entrepreneurs, designers and creators to promote original products and interact with consumers.

== Features ==
=== Shop feedback ===
A good way to investigate a Taobao shop is by clicking the shop's rating icon. For Tmall.com shops, people click the stars to view their ratings. Taobao users usually read feedback and compare items from multiple shops. Feedback can be genuine or artificial, requiring users to make their own judgments. Feedback can be posted by competitors.

Every trade deal includes a section of customer feedback. Shop owners may seek to improve customer ratings through service strategies. Negotiations may happen between sellers and consumers over their satisfaction ratings.

Taobao uses search tools and other functions to understand user demands. Customers are asked to complete surveys that ask:

- Obstacles encountered
- Advice and reviews
- Use frequency
- Importance of that particular product
- Satisfaction levels about specific aspects, including visual and typographic layout, procedure and instructions
- Overall satisfaction

=== Other features ===
Taobao Marketplace offers various features and services to create a better user experience for online shoppers and retailers. In January 2010, it launched the Taobao app, created by independent developers through the Taobao Open Platform, to be downloaded by consumers in Taobao App Store.

In March 2010, it introduced the Taobao Data Cube platform, which gives small businesses access to its aggregate consumer transactions data for insight into industry trends.

In June 2010, it partnered with Wasu Media Internet Limited to launch Taohua, a digital entertainment products platform, and interactive digital television shopping, that are operated by a joint-venture formed by the two companies.

=== Weitao ===
Weitao is a private shopping assistant/blog for Taobao/Tmall customers. It is a micro-blogging feature for brands and merchants on its e-commerce sites Taobao and Tmall.

=== Taobao General Code ===
Taobao has developed an extensive set of rules and a constitution which it terms the "General Code". The General Code consists of 6 chapters and 31 provisions prescribing the basic access requirements and obligations of users, seller obligations, and the platform's conflict resolution mechanism.

When Taobao proposes a rule change, all buyers and sellers with a sufficiently high Zhima credit score can vote and express their opinions on the rule. Taobao also invites professionals and academics with relevant expertise to public evaluate proposed rule changes in order to inform voters.

=== Public jury ===
Alibaba established its public jury (pan.taobao.com) dispute resolution system in 2012. By 2020, it was a widely used dispute resolution tool on the main Taobao platform and was also frequently used on Xianyu (Taobao's used goods platform).

Through the public jury process, Taobao randomly selects panels of 13 jurors (termed "public assessors" on Taobao) from a pool of 4 million volunteers. Candidates must have been on Taobao for at least a year and have sufficiently high Sesame Credit ratings. Volunteers earn experience points that can earn virtual titles and which can be "spent" for Taobao to make a donation to charity.

All participants in the public jury process are anonymized and no communication between or among the disputing parties and the jurors are permitted. Jurors review the case and vote within 48 hours. The party with the most votes wins. A party who is unsatisfied with the jury outcome can request further review by Taobao employees. Taobao can implement jury decisions through means including freezing payments, taking money from a sellers' store deposit, lowering user ratings, or removing a party from the platform.

Most public jury cases involve buyer-seller disputes. In some instances, Taobao has used large juries of 800 to 1000 jurors to decide issues relating to platform governance. For example, Taobao used a large jury to decide whether to allow a baby bottle manufacturer, Betta, to remain on the platform. Betta was a legal but copycat style product of the popular Japanese brand Doctor Betta, which was also sold on Taobao. Jurors voted to remove the copycat product from the platform.

=== Golden Cudgel ===
In 2019, Taobao launched a dispute resolution called Golden Cudgel, named after the monkey king's magical weapon in the 16th century novel Journey to the West. This mechanism allows sellers who have passed qualifying exams to remove a limited number of malicious reviews on a daily basis without prior permission from the platform. Sellers must submit evidence to establish the dishonest nature of each removed review to enable review by the platform. Sellers' ability to use the Golden Cudgel mechanism is revoked if they are found by the platform to have repeatedly removed reviews improperly.

== Services ==
=== Alipay ===
Launched in 2004, Alipay (simplified Chinese: 支付宝; traditional Chinese: 支付寶; pinyin: Zhīfùbǎo) is an escrow-based online payment platform. It is the preferred payment solution for Taobao Marketplace. It is the most widely used third-party online payment solution in China. To ensure safe transactions, Alipay uses an escrow system through which payment is only released to the seller once the buyer has received goods in satisfactory condition. According to the Alibaba Group website, Alipay partners with multiple financial institutions as well as Visa and MasterCard to facilitate payments in China and abroad.

At the time it was implemented, the mandatory escrow feature of Alipay was a major institutional innovation for e-commerce platforms. This was a major reason Taobao was able to outcompete eBay/EachNet in the Chinese market.

Alipay systems are separate for different groups of users. For instance, Alipay users may send and receive funds if they have an account that have a credit card issued in China, whereas users with other cards may only use Alipay to pay for goods or services from Taobao. This has proven problematic for international users, as they are unable to receive refunds not issued via the Taobao system.

=== AliExpress ===
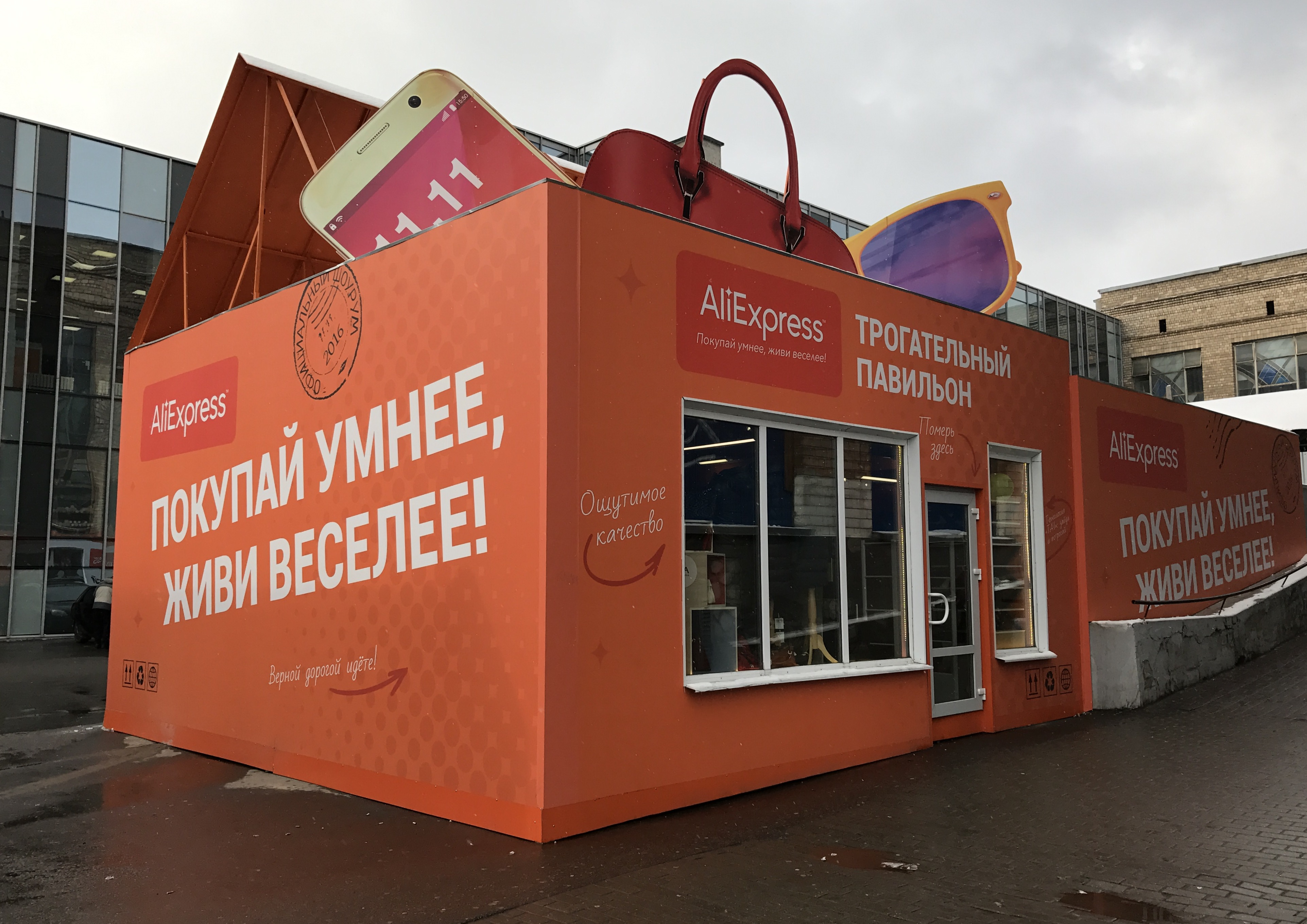
Aliexpress

AliExpress was created in April 2010 as an international retailing website. People who live overseas can use the service to purchase items from Chinese manufacturers online.

=== AliWangWang (TradeManager) ===
Taobao Marketplace allows buyers and sellers to communicate prior to the purchase through its embedded proprietary instant chat program, named AliWangWang (Chinese: 阿里旺旺; pinyin: ĀlǐWàngWàng).

=== Baopals ===
In February 2016, 3 American expats living in Shanghai launched Baopals, a shopping platform that translates Taobao and Tmall into English so that foreigners living in China can access its products and services. The site is supported by Alibaba, and was the first foreign-led group to win an entrepreneurial award from the Shanghai government. Over 7 million items have been sold on the platform.

=== Happy Taobao ===
In December 2009, Taobao, together with Hunan TV, set up Happy Taobao, Inc for television shopping. Hunan TV launched an entertainment series called "Happy Taobao", while Taobao Marketplace created channels and independent websites.

=== Taobao Live ===
In 2018, Alibaba launched the streaming service named Alibaba Live. This service was created with the goal of allowing online retailers to market their products utilizing social shopping. This has seen significant growth in popularity and success, with the 84 stores using this service reporting $7.4 million in 2020 sales. Taobao stated that they predict live-streaming on their platform will generate over 500 billion sales transactions. Taobao Live now has over 10,000 weblebrities promoting a wide range of items including as cosmetics, apparel, cuisine, and numerous electrical gadgets. Taobao Live's daily sales have already surpassed $3 billion.

Alibaba promotes a new style of live streaming, called cūnbō (村播), that features rural sellers. Taobao has given them their own category in the app, with the purpose of making it easier for these rural sellers to find customers and followers on the platform.

== Singles' Day ==
Singles' Day (also known as the Double eleven shopping carnival, as in 11/11) is the largest Chinese online shopping day. It takes place on November 11 each year. It takes the advantages of the Chinese singles day that was created by Chinese university students to celebrate their bachelordom. After the event was launched, it obtained widespread attention, attracting other e-commerce companies to imitate this model.

Singles day grew rapidly since its introduction in 2009. 2009 sales reached RMB50 million (£5.68 million): Sales grew rapidly thereafter:

- 2009: RMB50 million (£5.68 million)
- 2010: RMB900 million (£102 million)
- 2011: RMB3.4 billion (£386 million)
- 2012: RMB19.1 billion (£2.17 billion)
- 2013: RMB35 billion (£3.97 billion)
- 2015: RMB91.2 billion
- 2016: RMB120.7 billion
- 2017: RMB168.2 billion
- 2018: RMB213.5 billion
- 2019: RMB268.4 billion

In 2016, Alibaba introduced the T-mall double eleven party, inviting celebrities who took part in a Victoria's Secret show. At the 2017 party, Jack Ma launched his film Gong Shou Dao (Defend the Homeland with Kungfu).

Because of the huge trading volume and income in Singles Day, Taobao launched another promotional activity on December 12 (12/12), drove record trading every year thereafter.

== Technology ==
=== Anti-fraud ===
Taobao has a five layer system for fraud detection. "Account check" is the first layer: during this stage, automatic processes examine whether the account at issue has demonstrated suspicious activity. Fraud cases deemed obvious at this layer are declined. Taobao's system can also require further information and submit the transaction to the next three layers of automatic review: device check, activity check, and risk strategy. Each check sends fraud cases deemed obvious to an automatic decision and refers potential no-obvious fraud to the next level. These automated anti-fraud checks use big data models, including analysis of user behavioral data, network data, delivery details, and IP addresses. The final level is manual review by Taobao employees.

Taobao shares information with police and local courts to assist in locating sellers alleged to be selling counterfeit products. For example, in 2014, collaboration with law enforcement resulted in 1,000 counterfeit cases, 400 arrests, and the shutdown of 200 related physical stores, warehouses, and factories.

== Markets ==
=== Taobao for Southeast Asia ===
In September 2013, Taobao launched its Southeast Asian site. A translation feature is available for major languages in Southeast Asia. In September 2024, Taobao launched an English version of its app tailored specifically for users in Singapore.

== Controversies ==
Taobao has sometimes been the subject of in-person and online seller protests following major changes to its rules. The largest seller protest was the 2011 "October Rising". With the goal of reducing counterfeits and substandard products, Taobao had increased the Taobao Mall membership fees for sellers and their required cash deposits. The rule changes were made without warning. Approximately 50,000 sellers formed the "anti-Taobao alliance" for digital protest actions and in-person protest at Alibaba's headquarters. The Chinese government mediated the dispute, resulting in Taobao revising its seller fees and providing 1.8 billion RMB in support for small businesses using the platform.

In August 2017, the company removed controversial vendors offering personalised messages featuring African children over concerns of child exploitation. Some Chinese Taobao vendors claimed that their promotional videos featuring African children were "charity activity" in which most of the profits goes to the children. However the situation proved more complicated after a photographer contacted by the Beijing Youth Daily said "the children only received snacks or a few dollars as reward", indicating that there was legitimate child exploitation.

In 2019, Taobao removed all items related to the Houston Rockets in response to the organization's general manager Daryl Morey posting a tweet about Hong Kong.

In October 2020 amid rising geopolitical tensions between Taipei and Beijing, Taobao announced that it would exit the Taiwanese market after the Taiwanese government ordered the company to re-register as being backed by China or to leave the island if they don't.

The mobile app of Taobao was banned in India (along with other Chinese apps) on 2 September 2020 by the government, the move came amid the 2020 China-India skirmish.

In 2022, the Office of the United States Trade Representative named Taobao on its list of Notorious Markets for Counterfeiting and Piracy.

== Metrics ==
Taobao Marketplace had more than 5 million registered users as of June 2013 and hosted more than 80 million product listings. It facilitated approximately RMB 200 billion in gross merchandise volume in 2009. In September 2013, Taobao ranked 12th overall in Alexa's internet rankings.

With over 1 billion product listings as of 2016, the combined transaction volume of Taobao Marketplace and Tmall.com reached 3 trillion yuan in 2017.

As of 2020, Taobao hosted ten million online stores, 726 million active buyers, and a gross merchandise value of $945 billion.

As of 2021, Taobao was the 8th most visited website in the world and the 5th most visited website in China.

As of at least 2024, it was the world's most popular online shopping platform as measured by gross merchandise value.

== Taobao villages ==
Taobao villages are rural Chinese villages where the local economy has developed to focus extensively on Taobao. Alibaba's research division defines Taobao villages as those in which (1) businesses are located in an administrative village in a rural area, (2) the village's annual e-commerce revenues exceed RMB 10 million, and (3) the village has either an excess of 100 active online shops or active online shops account for more than 10% of village households.
