= Black Circle Boys =

- Promotional artwork
- Directed by: Matthew Carnahan
- Written by: Matthew Carnahan
- Produced by: Lysa Hayland; Raquel Carreras
- Starring: Scott Bairstow; Eric Mabius; Donnie Wahlberg
- Cinematography: Geary McLeod
- Edited by: Axel Hubert
- Release date: January 17, 1997 (Sundance)
- Running time: 100 minutes
- Country: United States
- Language: English

Black Circle Boys is a 1997 American horror drama film written and directed by Matthew Carnahan and starring Scott Bairstow, Eric Mabius and Donnie Wahlberg. It is Carnahan's feature directorial debut.

== Cast ==
- Scott Bairstow as Kyle
- Eric Mabius as Shane
- Heath Lourwood as Munn
- Chad Lindberg as Rory
- Tara Subkoff as Chloe
- Dee Wallace as Mrs. Sullivan
- Donnie Wahlberg as Greggo
- John Doe as Bonfiglio
- Lisa Loeb as Angry woman

== Production ==
Filming took place in Seattle, Washington.
