= Tmall =

Chinese e-commerce website

- Website type: E-Commerce retail
- Available in: Chinese
- Owner: Alibaba Group
- Creator: Jack Ma
- Website: www.tmall.com
- Commercial: Yes
- Launched: April 2008; 18 years ago
- Current status: Active

Tmall
- Simplified Chinese: 天猫
- Traditional Chinese: 天貓
- Literal meaning: heaven (Tian) cat
Transcriptions
Standard Mandarin
- Hanyu Pinyin: Tiān Māo

Tmall (simplified Chinese: 天猫; traditional Chinese: 天貓; pinyin: Tiānmāo), formerly Taobao Mall, is a Chinese website for business-to-consumer (B2C) online retail, spun off from Taobao, operated by Alibaba Group. It is a platform for local Chinese and international businesses to sell brand-name goods to consumers in Greater China. It has over 500 million monthly active users, as of February 2018. In the last few years, it has opened its features to brands, not only for online sales but also for developing brand awareness. According to Alexa rank, it was the third most visited website globally in 2021.

== History ==
Tmall.com was first introduced by Taobao in April 2008 as Taobao Mall (simplified Chinese: 淘宝商城; traditional Chinese: 淘寶商城; pinyin: Táobǎo Shāngchéng), a dedicated B2C platform within its consumer e-commerce website. The key difference between Tmall and Taobao is that Tmall is a B2C platform, while Taobao is C2C.

In November 2010, Taobao Mall launched an independent web domain, tmall.com, to differentiate listings by its merchants, who are either brand owners or authorized distributors, from Taobao's C2C merchants. Meanwhile, it kicked off a US$30 million advertising campaign to raise brand awareness among consumers. It also announced an enhanced focus on product verticals and improvements in shopping experience.

In June 2011, Alibaba Group Chairman and CEO Jack Ma announced a major restructuring of Taobao through an internal email. It was reorganized into three separate companies. As a result, Tmall.com became an independent business under Alibaba Group. The other two businesses that resulted from the reorganization are Taobao Marketplace (a C2C marketplace) and eTao (a shopping search engine). The move was said to be necessary for Taobao to "meet competitive threats that emerged in the past two years during which the Internet and e-commerce landscape has changed dramatically".

In October 2011, Tmall.com experienced two successive waves of online rioting since it significantly increased fees on online vendors. The service fees rose from 6,000 yuan ($940) to 60,000 yuan ($9,400) a year, and a compulsory fixed sum deposit went from 10,000 yuan ($1,570) to up to 150,000 yuan ($23,500). According to Tmall.com, the price increase was intended to help weed out merchants that are too often a source of fakes, shoddy products and poor customer service. Stores that earn top ratings for service and quality from customers and high sales volumes are entitled to partial or full refunds.

On January 11, 2012, TMall.com officially changed its Chinese name to Tiān Māo (天猫), the Chinese pronunciation of Tmall, which literally means "sky cat".

Tmall held a 51.3% share of the Chinese B2C online product sales market in Q1 2013.

In February 2014, Alibaba launched Tmall Global as a cross-border marketplace for foreign brands and merchants to sell directly to Chinese consumers. The cross-border model requires merchants no longer to have a legal entity in China nor hold stock in the country. Some of the biggest flagship stores on Tmall Global include Costco from the US and dm from Germany. Tmall launched as a global shopping site that allowed foreign brands to sell directly to Chinese consumers, even without a business license. By late 2014, the site had 5,400 retailers from 25 countries, with sales surging largely from February to November. Some brand names faced challenges such as advertising restrictions and low brand recognition in China, while Western brands like Nature's Bounty surpassed $700,000 in November sales by bypassing import approvals. Around 30 firms hit $1.61 million each, particularly in categories like food, cosmetics, and electronics. Alibaba encouraged brands to create holiday campaigns and use free trials to boost visibility despite search ranking limits for unlicensed sellers.

In June 2015, Alibaba announced that Tmall would include 11 more countries to its global platform that included foreign brands that are not sold in China. The new countries included U.S., New Zealand, Australia, Switzerland, France, Britain, Spain, Singapore, Thailand, Malaysia and Turkey where sellers could directly sell from the platform through their respective country's pavilion. Tmall is different than Alibaba's other platforms because it focuses on cross-border retail rather than international wholesale (Alibaba) or domestic wholesale (1668).

Presently Liu Bao is the current president of Tmall. Previously, Kuo Zhang worked on merchant-platform functions for Tmall and Taobao serving the company's Chinese online retail outlets. He was responsible for developing operational tools for merchants, supporting platform services, and managing aspects of the wider merchant ecosystem. He served as the general manager of Alibaba's Merchant Platform from 2011 to 2017 and was appointed president of Alibaba.com in 2017 after working in domestic consumer commerce operations.

In June 2017, Alibaba launched Brand Databank, which is a consumer data platform that aggregates online and offline interactions between brands and shoppers and maps them onto the awareness-interest-purchase-loyalty journey, also known as AIPL. This was described as the core of Uni Marketing Suite, and it gives brands a dashboard to see how many consumers are at each stage of the funnel as they are influenced by ad campaigns on Tmall, including the 11.11 sale and live streams. Kuo Zhang, the then general manager of Alibaba's merchant business, said the tools let brands continuously accumulate consumer assets and personalize reach. By 2019, partners were certified to help brands use Databank for Tmall flagship-store campaigns.

In 2024, Alibaba Group announced that a Alibaba E-Commerce Business Group will be formed that integrates various e-commerce business under one unified umbrella. This included Tmall in addition to Taobao, AliExpress, Alibaba, Lazada, Trendyol, 1688 and Fish.

After the Houston Rockets general manager's tweet about Hong Kong, Tmall delisted any items related to the organization from its sites.

== Metrics ==
Tmall.com was registered on October 17, 1997, with Alibaba Cloud Computing (Beijing) Co., Ltd. Tmall currently features more than 70,000 international and Chinese brands from more than 50,000 merchants and serves more than 180 million buyers. Tmall.com ranked number one among all Chinese B2C retail websites for 2010 in terms of transaction volume, with a gross merchandise volume of RMB30 billion – about three times the amount facilitated by 360buy, its closest competitor. The site accounts for a 47.6% share of the B2C online retail market in China, followed by 16.2% of 360buy and 4.8% of Amazon.cn.

According to Alexa, as of June 2021, Tmall.com was the 3rd most visited website in the world and the 1st most visited website in China.

== Features ==
Alipay, an escrow-based online payment platform owned by Alibaba Group, is the preferred payment solution for transactions on Tmall.com.

As on Taobao Marketplace, the C2C e-commerce platform under Alibaba Group, buyers and sellers can communicate prior to the purchase through AliWangWang (Chinese: 阿里旺旺; pinyin: ālǐ wàngwàng), its proprietary embedded instant messaging program. It has become a habit among Chinese online shoppers to "chat" with the sellers or their customer service team through AliWangWang to inquire about products, engage in bargaining, etc. prior to purchase.

Unlike online sales on marketplaces like Amazon, the operation of a TMall shop requires a specialized and dedicated cross-functional team. Such a team can either be employed by the merchant in-house or, as is more often the case, managed through a certified Tmall Partner Agency ("TP") which operates the store on an ongoing basis on behalf of the shop owner.

Since 2017, TMall provides merchants with a dedicated channel meant to support new launches, called TMall Heybox. Heybox offers vendors a large set of sophisticated digital marketing tools. It also features a raffle tool and product trial tool, which can enhance brand awareness and allows merchants to collect shoppers' feedback about their newly launched items.
