= Inside Game =

2019 film

- Theatrical release poster
- Directed by: Randall Batinkoff
- Written by: Andy Callahan
- Produced by: Randall Batinkoff; Michael Pierce; Paul J. Martino; Michael Tadross; Robert Capelli Jr; Adam W Rosen
- Starring: Scott Wolf; Eric Mabius; Will Sasso; Lindsey Morgan
- Music by: Jeff Beal
- Release dates: October 17, 2019 (San Diego International Film Festival); November 1, 2019
- Running time: 89 minutes
- Country: United States
- Language: English

Inside Game is a 2019 American crime sports drama film directed by Randall Batinkoff and starring Scott Wolf, Eric Mabius, Will Sasso, and Lindsey Morgan.

This film is based on the 2007 NBA betting scandal and centers on Tommy Martino (Wolf) and his two friends NBA referee Tim Donaghy (Mabius) and bookie Baba Battista (Sasso). It was released on November 1, 2019. Philadelphia, New York, New Jersey and Florida are the main settings and primary shooting locations were in the New Jersey environs.

== Plot ==
The plot follows a betting scheme between the three childhood friends who were uniquely situated to their roles.

== Cast ==
- Scott Wolf as Tommy Martino
- Eric Mabius as Tim Donaghy
- Will Sasso as Baba Battista
- Lindsey Morgan as Stephanie, Tommy's girlfriend
- Curtiss Cook as U.S. Attorney

== Reception ==
On the review aggregator website Rotten Tomatoes, 43% of 7 critics' reviews are positive.
