= A Christmas Wedding =

2006 film directed by Michael Zinberg

- Genre: Romantic comedy
- Written by: Richard Cray
- Story by: Matt Dorff
- Directed by: Michael Zinberg
- Starring: Dean Cain; Sarah Paulson; Eric Mabius
- Theme music composer: David Schwartz
- Country of origin: United States
- Original language: English

Production
- Producer: Michael Mahoney
- Cinematography: Derick V. Underschultz
- Editor: Steven Lang
- Running time: 89 minutes
- Production companies: Magic Rock Productions; Robert Greenwald Productions

Original release
- Network: Lifetime
- Release: December 11, 2006

A Christmas Wedding is a 2006 American made-for-television romantic comedy film directed by Michael Zinberg and starring Dean Cain, Sarah Paulson, and Eric Mabius. It was originally broadcast December 11, 2006, on Lifetime.

== Cast ==
- Sarah Paulson as Emily
- Eric Mabius as Ben
- Richard Blackburn as Robert
- Dean Cain as Tucker
- Reagan Pasternak as Jill
- Art Hindle as Jack
- Louise Pitre as Beth
- Mimi Kuzyk as Katharine
- George Buza as Big Daddy
- Owen Pattison as Buck Junior
- Dwayne Hill as Buck Senior
- Robert Bockstael as The Pastor

== Reception ==
DVD Talk said, "A Christmas Wedding inexplicably misses some obvious opportunities to juice up its rather staid plotline."

== See also ==
- List of Christmas films
