= Chris Sheridan (sportswriter) =

American sportswriter (born 1965)

Chris Sheridan (born May 14, 1965) is a sportswriter who formerly covered the National Basketball Association for ESPN. He previously worked 18 years for the Associated Press. After leaving ESPN, his basketball Web site, Sheridan Hoops, launched on September 5, 2011. On July, 9th, 2014, he was the first major NBA journalist to report that LeBron James would sign with and return to the Cleveland Cavaliers during his free agency. The report was ultimately confirmed by ESPN on July 11, 2014. Sheridan has covered Team USA senior men's national team longer than any American sportswriter, having first reported on them at the Atlanta Olympics in 1996. The website was closed in April, 2016.

Sheridan is a Marquette University graduate with a degree in journalism.
