= Personal Foul (book) =

2009 book by Tim Donaghy

Personal Foul: A First-Person Account of the Scandal That Rocked the NBA
- Cover of the book
- Author: Tim Donaghy
- Language: English
- Genre: Autobiography
- Publisher: VTi-Group, Inc.
- Publication date: December 2009
- Publication place: United States
- Media type: Print (paperback)
- Pages: 270 pp
- ISBN: 0-615-30603-9

Personal Foul: A First-Person Account of the Scandal That Rocked the NBA is an autobiography written by former National Basketball Association (NBA) referee Tim Donaghy and published by Florida-based VTi-Group, Inc. in December 2009. Donaghy, who had resigned from the league as a central figure in the 2007 NBA betting scandal, describes his involvement in and inner workings of the scandal, as well as his gambling addiction.

Originally named Blowing the Whistle: The Culture of Fraud in the NBA, the book was canceled by publisher Triumph Books because of liability concerns. Pat Berdan, Donaghy's liaison with Triumph, said the book was canceled after the NBA threatened legal action—which the NBA denies. Donaghy eventually found a new publisher, VTi-Group, that was willing to release his book. It was subsequently renamed Personal Foul: A First-Person Account of the Scandal That Rocked the NBA and released in December 2009.

"We approached Mr. Donaghy after learning that his original publishing deal fell through. With a background in web media and traditional publishing, Mr. Donaghy felt that our firm was the best fit to become the publisher for this unique project." said Benjamin Daniel, a project manager at VTi.

In the book, Donaghy describes his time as a referee in the CBA and NBA, discussing the NBA's inner workings, refereeing bias, TV media markets, owners in the NBA, marriage and divorce, NBA "scandals" (NBA favoring big-market teams, manipulating playoffs to extend to Game 7, star player privileges and so forth), his time in jail, court process, solving the NBA's problems, referee personalities, and his life story.
