= City Weekend =

Chinese magazine

City Weekend was a free, bi-weekly entertainment event and venue listing magazine based out of China. Its on-line edition was both autonomous and complementary to the print magazine — City Weekend was "reader-powered" and sources most of its information directly from the expat community. The last publication was in 2018, and they have closed operations in China since then. The website is not maintained anymore.

== History and profile ==
Founded in 1999, City Weekend created content related to dining, nightlife, arts, culture, health and wellness, fashion and shopping, local community news, and travel in the English language. It was one of the highest-circulation English magazines in China, available free.

The magazine distinguished itself by being one of the first private English language publications in China - it had been distributed since 1999 in Beijing, and 2000 in Shanghai; up until 2018.

The magazine itself acted as a source of information for many in the expat community. Staff relied on its reader-powered website to access local communities and generated everything from national articles to factual news about local events, venues, and classified ads in China's two largest cities — Beijing and Shanghai (and for a brief period Shenzhen, Guangzhou and Suzhou).

City Weekend also published a variety of free guides yearly, including a Bar and Restaurant Guide and the Service Directory (a small English business and service phone book). The magazine also produced supplements focusing on expat families (Parents & Kids, as well as Shanghai Family), and the real-estate market (Home & Office).

City Weekend was published by the Swiss multinational publisher Ringier, and its circulation was audited by BPA Worldwide.

In 2010, City Weekend launched an English-language group buying platform called FlashBuy, the first one of its kind targeting English speakers in both Beijing and Shanghai.

In 2014, City Weekend Beijing was sold to another company. Ringier continued to operate City Weekend nationally in China, everywhere except Beijing until 2018. In 2018, after a failed acquisition, City Weekend ended publication in China.
