= Tim Donaghy =

American basketball referee (born 1967)

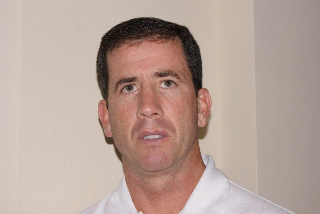
- Donaghy in 2010
- Born: Timothy Francis Donaghy; January 7, 1967 (age 59); Havertown, Pennsylvania, U.S.
- Education: Villanova University (Bachelor's Degree, 1989)
- Spouse: Kimberly Donaghy (m. 1995; div. 2007)
- Children: 4
- Basketball career

Career information
- Position: NBA referee
- Officiating career: 1994–2007

Timothy Francis Donaghy (/ˈdɒnəɡi/ DON-ə-ghee; born January 7, 1967) is an American former basketball referee who worked in the National Basketball Association (NBA) for 13 seasons from 1994 to 2007 until he was caught in a gambling scandal. During his career in the NBA, Donaghy officiated in 772 regular season games and 26 playoff games.

Donaghy resigned from the league on July 9, 2007, after reports of an investigation by the Federal Bureau of Investigation (FBI) for allegations that he bet on games that he officiated during his last two seasons and that he made calls that affected the point spread in those games. Donaghy later admitted to betting on games he officiated in each of the 2003–04, 2004–05, 2005–06, and 2006–07 seasons. On August 15, 2007, Donaghy pleaded guilty to two federal charges related to the investigation. He was sentenced to 15 months in federal prison on July 29, 2008. He served 11 months in a federal prison camp in Pensacola, Florida, and the remainder of his sentence in a halfway house, but was sent back to prison in August for violating his release terms. After serving out his sentence, he was released on November 4, 2009.

== Early life and education ==
Born in the Philadelphia suburb of Havertown, Pennsylvania, Donaghy attended Cardinal O'Hara High School in Springfield, Pennsylvania along with three other NBA referees: Joey Crawford, Mike Callahan, and Ed Malloy. His father, Gerry Donaghy, was a referee at the highest levels of NCAA men's basketball association for a long time. In 1989, Donaghy graduated from Villanova University with a degree in sales and marketing. While at Villanova, he played on the school's baseball team. According to the National Basketball Referee's Association, Donaghy participated and earned All-Catholic and All-Delaware County honors in baseball and All-Delaware County honors in basketball during high school, but then-Villanova baseball coach George Bennett contends that Donaghy did not play on the varsity team and that no records indicate that he was selected to the All-Catholic team in baseball or named to the All-Delaware County basketball team.

== Personality and behavior ==
As the father of Donaghy's lifelong best friend and fellow NBA scandal co-conspirator, Tommy Martino, said of him, "Timmy…(had) a very short temper and a penchant for wanting to get revenge for anything that he perceived as having been done to him where he was wrong." Donaghy's character flaws informed and influenced decisions in the federal NBA betting scandal investigation. He was notorious for his temper and "short fuse" dating at least to high school straight through the NBA scandal when a federal official described him as "a fucking loose cannon". He was arrested for allegedly harassing a mail carrier. He was sued by neighbors for harassment and invasion of privacy (suit was dropped, but Donaghy was suspended from his country club as a result of his actions). Another neighbor said Donaghy "was so bad you can’t imagine…The guy had a personality problem from day one, with 99% of people" with whom Donaghy came in contact. "Unless everything went his way…he just became a flaming maniac". The mayor of his township said Donaghy had "a very dictatorial personality, a very aggressive personality". Donaghy admitted to having someone else take his SAT exams for him when applying to Villanova University and one of Donaghy's high school teachers was quoted saying, "I taught him for a year, and I think every homework assignment he turned in to me was copied." Donaghy's wife, soon after filing for divorce, requested a restraining order because he allegedly threatened to "knock [her] head off [her] body" and that he was "enraged, out of control, cursing at [her] in front of [their] four children and making threats", although the matter was dropped when she didn't appear in court.

When Donaghy's name was publicized in 2007 as the referee involved in the scandal, reporters reached out to his former colleagues, teammates, classmates, and associates to learn more about him. The Delco Times wrote: "every teammate, classmate, or associate contacted…by the [Delco] Daily Times either chose not to comment on Donaghy or didn’t return phone calls…While there are those empathetic to Donaghy and his gambling-related plight, many others consider his a karmic downfall". The New York Daily News wrote, "Plenty of people did not remember Donaghy fondly. 'I think he's one of those guys who always thought he was smarter than the adults. He felt like he could do what he wanted and get away with it,' said one, adding, 'he would always talk to you like he was a genius and you were a dummy.'" National writers wrote similar assessments, including Yahoo! Sports NBA columnist Adrian Wojnarowski: "several sources described him as fairly unpopular with his peers, past and present…From his Philly basketball roots to his peers in the NBA, Donaghy isn’t described with much affection."

== Officiating career ==
Before officiating in the NBA, Donaghy spent five years officiating in Pennsylvania high school basketball and seven seasons in the Continental Basketball Association (CBA), and he was the head official for the 1993 CBA All-Star Game. The following year, he joined the NBA, where he worked for 13 years, officiating in 772 regular-season games and 20 playoff games. Donaghy was a participant in the NBA's Read to Achieve program, for which he participated in an event at the Universal Charter school during the 2002 NBA Finals. His uniform number was 21.

During a 2003 regular-season game, Donaghy called a technical foul on Rasheed Wallace, then playing with the Portland Trail Blazers, for throwing a ball at another official during a game. Wallace confronted Donaghy after the game, screaming obscenities and, according to Donaghy, threatening him. Wallace was suspended for seven games; this was the longest suspension issued by the league for an incident not involving violence or drugs.

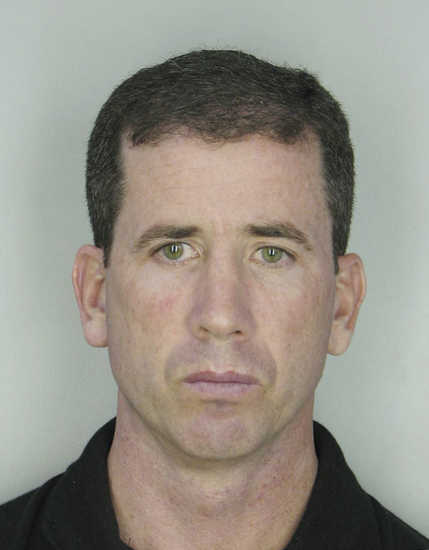
Donaghy's Mugshot - 2009

Donaghy was one of three referees who worked the Pacers–Pistons brawl at The Palace of Auburn Hills on November 19, 2004, which ended in a fight between Pacers players and Pistons fans.

== Betting scandal ==
On July 20, 2007, columnist Murray Weiss of the New York Post reported an investigation by the FBI into allegations of an NBA referee betting on games and controlling the point spread. It was revealed that Donaghy, who claimed during the sentencing phase of his case he had a gambling problem, placed tens of thousands of dollars in bets on games during the 2005–06 and 2006–07 seasons and had allegedly been approached by low-level mob associates to work on a gambling scheme. Reporters, especially those who worked crime beats and who had quality law enforcement and "street" sources, soon discounted the supposed involvement of the mob in the scandal, however. Mike Missanelli of The Stephen A. Smith Show suggested that Donaghy had gotten himself into debt and tried to make it up by betting on games.

While the league devotes significant resources to monitor officials' performance, it found out about the affair only when the FBI stumbled upon Donaghy in the midst of a broader organized crime investigation. NBA Commissioner David Stern said in a statement, "We would like to assure our fans that no amount of effort, time or personnel is being spared to assist in this investigation, to bring to justice an individual who has betrayed the most sacred trust in professional sports, and to take the necessary steps to protect against this ever happening again." He called the scandal a "wakeup call that says you can't be complacent."

On July 27, U.S. Representative Bobby Rush of Illinois, the chairman of the U.S. House Committee on Energy and Commerce's Commerce, Trade and Consumer Protection Subcommittee, asked to meet with Stern regarding the Donaghy matter. In a letter to Stern, Rush indicated that he might call a hearing "should the facts warrant public scrutiny." He also said that the affair could potentially be "one of the most damaging scandals in the history of American sports."

Earlier that day, federal sources told the New York Daily News that Donaghy would surrender to the FBI and plead guilty to gambling charges. The Daily News also learned that the bookies in the scandal were two high school classmates of Donaghy's who embellished their mob ties. The Daily News reported that at his friends' request, Donaghy had passed word about the crews working the games on which they planned to bet. The Associated Press identified one of the men as James Battista, a former owner of a sports bar in Havertown, Pennsylvania, a Philadelphia suburb. Battista's lawyer told the AP that his client expected to be indicted. It was later learned that it was Donaghy who embellished the supposed involvement of organized crime in the scandal, and that the bets for the 2003–04, 2004–05, 2005–06, and 2006-07 NBA seasons were almost exclusively on games officiated by Donaghy. Indeed, researchers investigated the sociology of the bets using electronic betting records and betting line data and concluded there was no evidence to support Donaghy's contention he bet almost as equally on games he officiated, and considerable evidence the bets were on games he officiated (which supported the FBI submissions of Donaghy's best friend and NBA co-conspirator Tommy Martino and of pro gambler cooperators).

At his home in Bradenton, Donaghy did not initially comment on his situation. He reportedly claimed to be "the butler" to visiting reporters and turned his sprinklers on a freelance photographer for the New York Times when he got too close. His then-wife Kimberly passed a note to reporters telling them not to bother asking them any questions.

On August 15, Donaghy appeared in a Brooklyn federal court and pleaded guilty to conspiracy to engage in wire fraud and transmitting wagering information through interstate commerce. Donaghy told U.S. District Judge Carol Amon that he used coded language to tip Battista about players' physical condition and player/referee relations. In doing so, Donaghy disclosed classified information that he obtained as an NBA referee. Donaghy initially received $2,000 per correct pick, but his calls were so accurate that Battista increased his take to $5,000. In total, he received $300,000 to pass inside information to the bookies. Another high school friend of Donaghy, Thomas Martino, acted as the middle man. Donaghy also claimed that he had a severe gambling addiction for which he was taking antidepressants. Researchers explained the "coded language" referenced by Donaghy was significant because it supported the contention of his co-conspirators (who each discussed the code) that the bets were on games Donaghy officiated (i.e., if Donaghy phoned in a pick using the code "Mom" for the home team, the only way his middleman Martino could know which team to pick was if the game/matchup was known).

Donaghy specifically admitted to passing information about two games during the 2006–07 season. Prosecutors also said that Donaghy bet on games himself. Donaghy was fined $500,000 and ordered to pay at least $30,000 in restitution. ESPN legal analyst Lester Munson believed that Battista was one of the FBI's prime targets, based on the large amounts of money he bet.

Donaghy was released on a $250,000 bond and awaited sentencing on January 25, 2008. On June 19, 2008, the NBA filed a demand that Donaghy reimburse the league for the costs of his airfare and meals, complimentary game tickets, and other expenses, including $750 in shoes. Donaghy's lawyer said this was the league trying to retaliate against Donaghy for his misconduct. A judge delayed sentencing to allow for more time to decide how much restitution Donaghy and his two co-conspirators should pay the NBA for their roles in the betting scandal. The NBA claimed Donaghy owed it $1.4 million, including $577,000 of his pay and benefits over four seasons, plus hefty legal fees and other expenses related to an internal investigation. His lawyer argued that the punishment should apply to only one season, a position supported by the government in court papers.

According to the Associated Press, Andrew Thomas, the former county attorney for Maricopa County, Arizona, asked the NBA and FBI if Donaghy intentionally miscalled two Phoenix Suns road playoff games. The games in question occurred on April 29, 2007, versus the Los Angeles Lakers and May 12, 2007, versus the San Antonio Spurs. In a letter to Stern and FBI Director Robert Mueller, Thomas said that Donaghy's conduct may have violated Arizona criminal law, and could face charges there.

=== Allegations against NBA ===
On June 10, 2008, Donaghy's attorney filed a court document alleging, among other things, that Game 6 of the 2002 Western Conference Finals between the Los Angeles Lakers and Sacramento Kings had been fixed by two referees. The letter states that Donaghy "learned from Referee A that Referees A and F wanted to extend the series to seven games. Tim knew Referees A and F to be 'company men', always acting in the interest of the NBA, and that night, it was in the NBA's interest to add another game to the series." The Lakers won Game 6, attempting 18 more free throws than the Kings in the fourth quarter, and went on to win the 2002 NBA Finals. The teams were not named, but the Western Conference Finals was the only seven-game series that year. The document claimed that Donaghy told federal agents that to increase television ratings and ticket sales, "top executives of the NBA sought to manipulate games using referees." It also said that NBA officials would tell referees not to call technical fouls on certain players and stated that a referee was privately reprimanded by the league for ejecting a star player in the first quarter of a January 2000 game. Stern denied the accusations, calling Donaghy a "singing, cooperating witness". Federal authorities investigated Donaghy's claims and found no evidence to support them. About this, AUSA Jeffrey Goldberg told the court, "we’ve never taken the position that Mr. Donaghy has lied to us. But there is a difference between telling the truth and believing you’re telling the truth and finding out later that a number of the allegations don’t hold any water."

=== Sentencing ===
On July 29, 2008, Donaghy was sentenced in the United States District Court for the Eastern District of New York to 15 months in prison for his participation in the gambling scandal. Donaghy could have faced up to 33 months, but Judge Carol Amon reduced his sentence to 15 months (two 15-month terms served concurrently, followed by three years of supervised release) in exchange for his cooperation. Judge Amon noted she held Donaghy "more culpable" than his two co-conspirators and added, "Without Mr. Donaghy, there was no scheme." His lawyer, John Lauro, asked for probation, but the request was denied. Donaghy apologized in court: "I brought shame on myself, my family and the profession." Battista and Martino were sentenced earlier that month, receiving sentences of 15 months and 366 days, respectively.

=== Effect on NBA ===
As a result of the betting scandal, Stern revised the guidelines on the behavior of NBA referees during the Board of Governors' meeting in 2007. Despite the labor agreement for referees, which restricted them from participating in almost all forms of gambling, it was revealed that about half of the NBA's officials had made bets in casinos, albeit not with sportsbooks. In addition, all referees had admitted to engaging in some form of gambling. Stern stated that the "ban on gambling is absolute, and in my view it is too absolute, too harsh and was not particularly well-enforced over the years." The gambling rules were revised to allow referees to engage in several forms of betting but not on sports. There were several other referee-related rule changes made: the announcement of the referees calling a game was moved from 90 minutes before tip-off to the morning of the game, to reduce the value of the information to gamblers; referees received more in-season training and counseling on gambling; more thorough background checks were carried out; the league declared its intention to analyze the statistical relationship between NBA games and referees' gambling patterns for those games; and the interactions between referees and NBA teams were made easier and more formal.

== Post-sentencing ==
In the federal prison camp in Pensacola, Florida, Donaghy started to write his memoir, Blowing the Whistle: The Culture of Fraud in the NBA. The book was to have covered his NBA career, described his dealings with the "underworld" during the betting scandal, and explained how he would determine the winning team in the games he refereed. Donaghy also promised to "discuss the relationship that players, coaches and referees have with each other." The book was due to be published in October 2009. However, Donaghy's publisher, Triumph Books, canceled it because of liability concerns. Pat Berdan, Donaghy's liaison with Triumph, said the book was canceled after the NBA threatened legal action—which the NBA denies. Donaghy found a new publisher, VTi-Group, willing to release the book, which was renamed Personal Foul: A First-Person Account of the Scandal That Rocked the NBA. The book was released in December 2009. Many of the key claims Donaghy makes in the book and in related appearances have been debunked with evidence. Some of the main falsehoods debunked concern specifics about the NBA (e.g., game outcomes, related player stats) and especially about the scandal itself (e.g., the origin of the scandal, allegations of organized crime involvement and threats, which games were bet, the sociology of the betting, how the scandal ended) along other vital issues pertaining to the FBI's investigation, the government's prosecution, and the sentencing judge's assessment of his actions. In 2020, prominent sports journalist and frequent NBA betting scandal commentator Henry Abbott said, "I’ve never encountered someone who lies as much as (Donaghy). He’s soooooo full of crap."

Donaghy claims that while imprisoned, he was attacked and threatened. He also claims that in November 2007 a man claiming to be an associate of the New York Mafia struck Donaghy with a paint roller extension bar, resulting in injuries to his knee and leg which required surgery. FBI SSA (ret.) Philip Scala and his colleagues scoffed at the notion a mobster harmed Donaghy in prison. Said Scala, "If organized crime wanted to hurt Donaghy, he wouldn't be around today."

Donaghy was released from prison after serving 11 months and was due to finish his sentence in a recovery house near Tampa, Florida, where he was to be treated for his gambling addiction, as mandated by the court. He was arrested and put in the county jail in late August after being caught at a health club without permission, when he should have been at work. His lawyer and his ex-wife both insisted that Donaghy should not have been taken into custody, as he was allowed to visit the center to rehabilitate his injured knee.

On November 4, 2009, Donaghy was released from prison in Hernando County after serving out the remainder of his sentence.

Donaghy sued VTi-Group, the publisher of his memoir, for not paying him. In June 2012, a jury found VTi liable for breach of contract. Donaghy was awarded $1.3 million.

On April 22, 2014, Donaghy claimed that the league office was going to push referees to fix playoffs games to have the Brooklyn Nets beat the Toronto Raptors, so they could advance to the second round and face the Miami Heat because it would be good for ratings, which it was. On May 4, 2014, the Nets eliminated the Raptors after winning game seven of the series by a point.

Donaghy was featured in the 2016 released documentary film Dirty Games – The dark side of sports.

Before Game 5 of the 2017 NBA Finals, Donaghy claimed that referees would be instructed to extend the series for financial reasons. However, the series ended in Game 5 with the Golden State Warriors defeating the Cleveland Cavaliers 4–1.

On November 1, 2019, the movie Inside Game was released in theaters. The official film description focuses on Donaghy's take on the NBA betting scandal. While promoting the film, Martino admitted he and Donaghy had agreed years prior to lie about the threats Donaghy allegedly heard from the third co-conspirator, pro gambler Jimmy Battista.

== Professional wrestling ==
On January 27, 2021, Donaghy made his debut as a professional wrestling referee for Major League Wrestling (MLW), helping Richard Holliday defeat Savio Vega in a title match for the IWA Caribbean Heavyweight Championship. He has a "heel referee" gimmick with numerous references to the gambling scandal intertwined in storyline.

== Personal life ==
Donaghy married his wife Kimberly in 1995. They have four daughters. In September 2007, shortly after the scandal broke, Kim filed for divorce. Donaghy is Catholic.

Donaghy was arrested on December 22, 2017, for aggravated assault. He was released on $5,000 bond and given an arraignment, scheduled for January 19, 2018. Donaghy had been looking for his 19-year-old daughter, who he believed was doing drugs at a friend's house. The two got into an argument; Donaghy told the house owner that he was going to hit him with a hammer if he came any closer. Donaghy's attorney said that he was "just trying to be a good dad."
