= NBA criticisms and controversies =

The National Basketball Association has faced criticisms and controversies during its existence, ranging from issues of race and culture to team relocations.

== Age limit ==
In 2005, the NBA created a new collective bargaining agreement. One of the main issues was the league's desire to create a new lower age limit for players to enter the NBA draft.

The idea of an age limit had been talked about for years. While several players who entered the league out of high school became successes (Kobe Bryant, LeBron James, Kevin Garnett, Dwight Howard, J. R. Smith, Amar'e Stoudemire, Jermaine O'Neal, Rashard Lewis, Tracy McGrady, Shawn Kemp, and Moses Malone), others were relative failures (for example, Ndudi Ebi, James Lang, Kwame Brown, Sebastian Telfair, Eddy Curry, Robert Swift, and DeSagana Diop). Age limit supporters argued that high schoolers had undeveloped fundamental skills and were not mature enough to handle the NBA.

Well, they are physically mature enough to be part of the NBA, and they are great young players. But as you frame the issue, the question is whether a couple of years more of seasoning would increase their maturity, their skills, their collegiate programs and ultimately what it could do for sending messages to kids who are practicing their skills who should think about getting an education rather than coming right to [the] NBA.

— NBA commissioner David Stern in a 2001 interview with CNN's Wolf Blitzer,

Proponents included Michael Wilbon, who argued that it was important for young players to get an education. Wilbon's belief, while held by many, was also referred to as "simplistic" and "[reflective] not just [of] hypocrisy but a reimagination of reality as well". Michael Mccann of the Mississippi College School of Law made this argument:

In stark contrast to popular myth, this Article finds that players drafted straight out of high school are not only likely to do well in the NBA, but are likely to become better players than any other age group entering the league. ... Beyond excellence in performance, high school players can also earn substantially more over the course of their NBA careers ... players who bypass college may earn as much as $100 million more over the course of their careers than had they earned a college diploma.

Greg Anthony was notably against the age limit. Anthony's belief was that people should be able to make their own decisions about whether or not to enter the league. This led him into conflict with Wilbon and Stephen A. Smith. Anthony and Smith had a heated debate about the prospect. The interview was described as "...Greg Anthony putting words in O'Neal's mouth then saying something along the lines of, 'Is that what you meant?' And then O'Neal would say, 'Exactly.'" This came days after Anthony was the primary interviewer in a discussion with Indiana Pacers forward Jermaine O'Neal. It came on the heels of O'Neal discussing the age limit in the race context.

As a black guy, you kind of think [race is] the reason why it's coming up. You don't hear about it in baseball or hockey. To say you have to be 20, 21 to get in the league, it's unconstitutional. If I can go to the U.S. Army and fight the war at 18, why can't you play basketball for 48 minutes and then go home? ... In the last two or three years, the Rookie of the Year has been a high school player. There were seven high school players in the All-Star game, so why we even talking [about] an age limit?

— Jermaine O'Neal,

O'Neal was attacked for his opinion, with many accusing him of playing the race card.

Ultimately, an age limit was added to the collective bargaining agreement. The draft admitted only players who were in the calendar year of their 19th birthday, and at least one year out of high school. Since the implementation of these rules, certain players used alternative methods to enter the draft, to the point where some players declare while in high school. Players like Brandon Jennings, Emmanuel Mudiay, and Terrance Ferguson entered the draft while spending a year out overseas (sometimes more as LaMelo Ball did). More recently, players such as Satnam Singh, Thon Maker, and Anfernee Simons entered the draft while high school postgraduates, meaning they played a fifth year of high school basketball for various reasons instead of going to college. Furthermore, both Latavious Williams and Mitchell Robinson entered the draft by joining the NBA Development League (now NBA G League) and skipping college, while Darius Bazley entered after an internship with New Balance for a few months instead.

== Altercations ==
=== Latrell Sprewell ===
In 1997, Latrell Sprewell, during a contentious Golden State Warrior practice, choked head coach P.J. Carlesimo and threatened to kill him. While some wondered if Sprewell's actions were indicative of a trend, others countered that it was an isolated incident. Buck Williams said this on PBS:

Now it's a different way. It's a different player. And I think what's happening, you know, in our environment, in our society, is sort of—it just reflects what's happening in NBA. I mean, a lot of the players are young and sort of misunderstood. And it takes a very special coach, and it takes quite an understanding organization to try to deal with the new athlete.

Sprewell somewhat redeemed his image after a run to the NBA Finals with the New York Knicks in 1999. However, his image took another hit after a battle with the Minnesota Timberwolves over his salary in 2004.

=== Pacers–Pistons brawl ===
Ron Artest was a major participant in the infamous Malice at the Palace.

After an altercation between Indiana Pacers players and Detroit Pistons fans on November 19, 2004, the NBA came under criticism. Opinions were divided over who should be blamed for the incident. Blame landed on the players, with criticism of NBA Union Chief Billy Hunter, who protested the length of suspensions, the fans who sparked the melee and the referees who did not put a stop to it.

Commentators such as USA Today's Ian O'Connor viewed the incident through a racial lens, writing:

Commentators are examining the widening gulf between overwhelmingly black NBA teams and the white fans who follow them. It's healthy to ask tough questions about the uneasy state of race relations in sports and beyond; the more these issues are addressed in public forums, the better the chance of not having to examine them in the future... Sometimes we see race when we should simply see foolishness and hate. That's the product of living inside a sports culture where equal opportunity on the coaching, executive and ownership levels remains an elusive ideal.

The NBA came under harsh scrutiny from some outlets. Conservative radio personality (and former ESPN NFL analyst) Rush Limbaugh said the brawl was "hip-hop culture on parade" and added that "NBA uniforms are now in gang colors. They are in gang styles." NBA commissioner David Stern, in a 2006 interview, made this comment about the brawl-related criticism:

When Ron Artest went into the stands, it was, "All those players are …" … And I know for a fact that they're not all the same, so I wonder why they're so easily generalized. Maybe we're not doing as good of a job as we should be doing, or maybe there's something else at work.

=== Knicks–Nuggets brawl ===
The Knicks–Nuggets brawl came at an NBA game between the New York Knicks and Denver Nuggets at Madison Square Garden on December 16, 2006. This altercation was the most penalized on-court fight since the Pacers–Pistons brawl.

All ten players on the court at the time were ejected, and seven players were later suspended. Carmelo Anthony of the Nuggets was suspended for 15 games, while J. R. Smith and Nate Robinson were suspended for 10 games each. Neither coach was suspended; still, some believed that then-should have been suspended for allegedly telling his players to foul any Nuggets player who attempted a dunk or layup. Stern received criticism for not including Knicks coach Isiah Thomas in the suspensions. Stern's leniency was alleged to reflect a special relationship with Thomas.

Thomas was accused of trying to bring back the mentality of the late 1980s Detroit Pistons, who were known for their physical play. Thomas was seen warning Anthony not to go into the lane. Greg Anthony stated that "I never had a coach say that to an opponent ... I've had a coach say, do a better job protecting our territory. That's a little different."

The fight became a topic on news broadcasts. Several columnists claimed that the NBA had been set back several years, and the league was a haven for thugs.

Knicks guard Steve Francis claimed that the media reaction and the suspensions were "racially motivated". Francis argued that MLB and the NHL had similar fights and rarely faced the type of media attention and scrutiny that the NBA received. Several columnists agreed, including Sam Smith (who called the coverage "racist and nonsense" in a piece), J. A. Adande and David Aldridge.

== Conspiracy theories ==
=== Big-market bias/Lack of parity ===
Some NBA fans accused the league of conspiring to ensure that large-market teams and popular players make it to the postseason. Every NBA Finals since 1980 has involved at least one of these 10 teams: the Boston Celtics, Chicago Bulls, Detroit Pistons, Golden State Warriors, Houston Rockets, Los Angeles Lakers, Oklahoma City Thunder, Miami Heat, Phoenix Suns, or San Antonio Spurs. Additionally, in that span, every NBA Finals except for the 2021, 2025 or 2026 Finals has involved at least one of these 12 All-Stars: Larry Bird, Magic Johnson, Isiah Thomas, Michael Jordan, Hakeem Olajuwon, Shaquille O'Neal, Tim Duncan, Kobe Bryant, Jimmy Butler, LeBron James, Jayson Tatum, or Stephen Curry.

Many of these accusations are based on the premise that the NBA desires large markets and popular players for ratings purposes. Former CBS Sports president Neal Pilson disputed the idea that matchups have the biggest effect on ratings:

Ratings are a factor, but the "conspiracy theory" misses the whole point. It has nothing to do with a great matchup, it has to do with the total number of games. NBC would trade a great matchup that's a sweep in a flash for a bad matchup that goes seven games.

This conspiracy increased with the rise of so-called "superteams" in free agency, where star players (free agents or not) "team up" with other players of similar stature on a large-market team in a lucrative location. The term evolved after emerging from James' public free-agent declaration in 2010s The Decision. Notable examples of players leaving a smaller market to either join or create superteam include James (Cleveland to Miami), Kevin Durant (Oklahoma City to Golden State), and Paul George (Oklahoma City to LA Clippers). The first two moves drew particular backlash, especially James's due to favorite son status in Ohio. Some speculated that this has caused NBA ratings in the late 2010s to drop due to a lack of narrative surprise in the regular season.

Since the 2019 NBA Finals, however, the league oversaw a lengthy period of parity, as eight different teams won the NBA championship. This span included wins by Canada's lone NBA team in the Toronto Raptors, smaller-market teams such as the Milwaukee Bucks, Denver Nuggets and Oklahoma City Thunder, and teams in bigger markets such as the Lakers, Celtics, Warriors and New York Knicks. 5 other teams have played in the finals during that time, the Heat, Suns, Mavericks, Indiana Pacers, and the Spurs.

=== Celtics v Lakers ===
The 1984 NBA Finals was highly anticipated, featuring the Boston Celtics and the Los Angeles Lakers in their eighth Finals matchup. It featured two of the biggest young stars of the era, Larry Bird and Magic Johnson, who had previously faced off in the finals of the 1979 NCAA Division I Basketball Tournament, where Johnson's Michigan State Spartans defeated Bird's Indiana State Sycamores.

Game 6 proved controversial when the Lakers were sent to the foul line on numerous occasions thanks to questionable calls. This led Bird to claim that Commissioner Stern had requested that the game be officiated in the Lakers' favor in hopes of extending the series to a seventh game.

Stern told a fan that the NBA needed a seven-game series, that the league needed the money. When the commissioner makes a statement like that to a fan, you know it's going to be tough. When Stern makes a statement like that, things are going to happen. You just don't make statements like that and not expect anything out of it. He's the commissioner and he shouldn't be saying anything like that. The NBA wanted a seventh game because they wanted to make more money and they got their wish. There is no reason for me to lie. He said it. He's a man and he'll live up to it. He may say he said it in jest. But I'm out there trying to make a living and win a championship.

— Larry Bird after Game 6,

Despite his claim, the Celtics won Game 7. Boston made the next three Finals, losing to the Lakers in 1985 and 1987, and defeating the Houston Rockets in 1986.

=== Pistons v Lakers ===
The 1988 NBA Finals was yet another controversial series, with the Detroit Pistons reaching the Finals for the first time ever to play the Los Angeles Lakers. It featured two of the biggest stars, Magic Johnson and Isiah Thomas.

The Pistons took a 3–2 series lead. With 14 seconds remaining in Game 6 and the Pistons up 102–101, Bill Laimbeer was called for a foul on Kareem Abdul-Jabbar. The foul was controversial as the replay appeared to show that Laimbeer had never made contact with Abdul-Jabbar. Regardless, Laimbeer fouled out on the call, and Abdul-Jabbar made both free throws to give the Lakers a 103–102 victory. The Lakers won Game 7 108–105, clinching the title. In his 1993 book, The Winner Within, Lakers coach Pat Riley referred to the call as "that phantom skyhook foul."

=== Bucks v Sixers ===
In 2001, the Milwaukee Bucks played the Philadelphia 76ers in the Eastern Conference Finals. The small-market Bucks (who had not been featured on national television that season before the second round of the Playoffs) did not have any celebrity players, except for Ray Allen (who was popular, but not in the upper-echelon in terms of endorsements). Their opponent that year, the 76ers, had the polarizing but popular Allen Iverson, who had endorsements and recognition. The Sixers featured that year's MVP (Iverson), Defensive Player of the Year Dikembe Mutombo, Sixth Man of the Year Aaron McKie, and Coach of the Year Larry Brown. During game 5, numerous major calls favored the 76ers. Allen later voiced the claim that the league preferred the Sixers to be in the Finals as opposed to Milwaukee.

I think there's no question about that. The league, as a marketing machine, the bottom line is about making money, it behooves everybody for the league to make more money, and the league knows that Philadelphia is going to make more money with L.A. than we would with L.A.

— Milwaukee Bucks star Ray Allen, before Game 6 of the 2001 Eastern Conference Finals.

This controversy is largely based on complaints levied by members of the Bucks organization regarding the officiating of the series. Glenn Robinson, Sam Cassell, and then-head coach George Karl joined Allen in complaining about the officiating and hinting that the league was against them. Karl and Allen were both fined. In Game 6, Bucks forward Scott Williams threw an elbow at Iverson and was subsequently suspended for the deciding Game 7. (Iverson had already missed the Bucks' Game 3 win, and been limited in others after being hit by the Bucks earlier in the series.) After the Bucks lost Game 7 on the road, Sports Illustrated columnist Marty Burns insinuated that the suspension may have been a form of payback by the league:

Williams' elbow to Iverson's chin warranted the flagrant 2 ruling, which kept Williams out of Game 7, but the Bucks' public airing of such potentially damaging charges to the NBA probably didn't help their case.

While normally a starter, Williams generally played limited minutes and averaged just over 4 points per game during the portion of the series in which he played. He was suspended because this was his third flagrant foul of the playoffs.

The Sixers were fourth in the league in regular-season free throws attempted. The Bucks, largely a jump shooting team, were 25th.

=== Kings v Lakers ===
The 2002 Western Conference Finals between the Sacramento Kings and the Lakers was one of the most memorable. The popular (though small-market) Kings led the two-time defending NBA champion Lakers three games to two heading into Game 6 at the Staples Center, a game which would prove to be the most infamous of the series. The game, which the Lakers won by four, featured several disputable calls, including a late game no-call involving Mike Bibby—after he was bleeding from an elbow blow to the nose by Bryant. This game was the epitome of the major issue in the series. Both teams complained about the officiating at different points (the Kings in Game 6 and the Lakers in Games 2 and 5). Quoting then-ESPN basketball analyst David Aldridge:

There is nothing I can say that will explain 27 free throws for the Lakers in the fourth quarter – an amount staggering in its volume and impact on the game. It gave me pause. How can you explain it? How can you explain a game where Scot Pollard fouls out when he's two feet from Shaquille O'Neal, or that Doug Christie is called for a ridiculous touch foul just as Chris Webber spikes Bryant's drive to the hoop, or that Mike Bibby is called for a foul deep in the fourth quarter after Bryant pops him in the nose with an elbow?

The Kings lost Game 7 at home. Former NBA referee Tim Donaghy filed court papers in 2008 saying that Game 6 was fixed by the NBA. Stern denied these allegations. Lawrence Pedowitz, who led a review of the league's officiating following the scandal, concluded that, while Game 6 was poorly officiated, no concrete evidence existed of illegal behavior.

=== Accusation from Jeff Van Gundy ===
During a 2005 playoff series against the Dallas Mavericks, Houston Rockets coach Jeff Van Gundy was fined a record amount for a coach, $100,000, for asserting that he had a source within the league who informed him that the referees were being instructed to call more fouls on Yao Ming, due to protests by Mavericks owner Mark Cuban.

=== Dallas v Miami ===
The 2006 NBA Finals came the year after a series that achieved the second-lowest ratings in NBA Finals history. After the Detroit Pistons and the small-market San Antonio Spurs slugged it out in a seven-game series, the 2006 Finals was considered more attractive because it featured the relatively large market teams Miami Heat and Dallas Mavericks and superstars Dirk Nowitzki, Shaquille O'Neal, and Dwyane Wade.

With the series tied at two apiece, Game 5 was pivotal. On the final possession in overtime, Wade received an inbounds pass from midcourt. Because Wade had already been in the frontcourt before the inbound of the ball, some argue that he should have been ruled ineligible to receive the pass in the backcourt and the Heat should have been called for a backcourt violation. After receiving the ball, Wade drove to the basket, drawing a foul on Nowitzki. Replays revealed that Nowitzki barely touched Wade, further angering Mavericks fans. However, the replay also showed Mavericks' guard Devin Harris grabbing Wade's arm. In between Wade's free throws, Maverick Josh Howard looked to coach Avery Johnson to see if he wanted to call for time. Howard made a timeout gesture towards his coach; referee Joe Derosa saw this and charged Dallas with their final timeout.

Without a timeout, the Mavericks were forced to inbound from the basline after Wade hit his second free throw. Unable to get off a shot from inside of half court as time expired, the Mavericks lost the game and the series two nights later. Game 5 had 38 fouls called against the Mavericks, against only 26 on the Heat. The Mavericks shot 25 free throws while the Heat shot 49. After Game 5, Cuban was livid; he was quoted by The Miami Herald as screaming at Stern that "[his] league is rigged". Cuban denied making the statement, and went on to write:

Any prudent, rational person can easily see it. The games are not rigged. That's a complete insult to the players on the court and the incredible amount of effort they put into preparing for and playing the games. All 82 regular season and postseason games. The NBA couldn't rig the games if it wanted to. And it doesn't want to. It's that simple.

Despite his denial, Cuban was fined $250,000 by the league, not for his alleged comments, but for general "acts of misconduct" following the game.

In Game 5, Wade shot 25 free throws, equaling the entire Mavericks team total.

In Game 6, suspicions ran even higher as the Heat were awarded 37 free throws compared to the Mavericks' 23. Wade shot 21 free throws, nearly matching the Mavericks' team total, including those from a foul called after bumping into Nowitzki, who was standing in Wade's way during the last 10 seconds of play, which cost them the game and allowed the Heat to walk away with their first championship. Following the season, Cuban allegedly hired a former FBI agent to investigate the series, before dropping the investigation.

=== Suns v Spurs ===
In what some media outlets claimed were the true 2007 NBA Finals that year, the 2007 Western Conference Semi-Finals match heated rivals Suns and Spurs under what became their most controversial series. The Suns and the small-market Spurs kicked off the series with a 111–106 Spurs win, including a collision between Steve Nash and Tony Parker, leaving Nash with a deep cut on his nose that forced him to sit out for a good portion of Game 1. After a dominant 101–81 performance from the Suns in Game 2, the Spurs took Game 3 with a 108–101 win, and Manu Ginóbili earned a black eye after he was poked by Shawn Marion. Near the end of Game 4, the series reached its climax.

In the final minute the Suns pulled ahead and won 104–98 to even the series, Robert Horry of the Spurs collided with Steve Nash during a play and pushed Nash into the scorer's table mid-court. During this altercation, Raja Bell of the Suns tried to help his teammate, but was stopped by the referees and players, including Amar'e Stoudemire and Boris Diaw, who were on the bench at the time. As a result of that altercation, Horry received a two-game suspension, while Diaw and Stoudemire were suspended for Game 5. The only rule that Stern said they had violated was leaving the bench. Suns head coach Mike D'Antoni questioned the fairness of their suspensions although they were not instigators:

"We have the most powerful microscopes and telescopes in the world in Arizona, (and) you could use those instruments and not find a shred of fairness or common sense in that decision", D'Antoni said after the Suns' morning shooting session (May 16). "That's kind of how it feels. It really benefits no one. It doesn't benefit us, obviously. It doesn't benefit the Spurs. It doesn't benefit the fans. It doesn't benefit the NBA.

— Mike D'Antoni,

The suspensions proved to be the Suns' downfall. Despite leading most of Game 5 at home, the Suns lost it 88–85 and then lost Game 6 and the series in San Antonio 114–106. The call on their suspensions was further questioned in 2009 after a similar situation occurred with the Boston Celtics, although key players on their team did not receive similar suspensions. In the aftermath of the 2007 Playoffs, one of the referees, Tim Donaghy, was involved in a betting scandal that claimed fix-ups on certain games. During a 2011 interview, he admitted that he felt the Suns were the better team that season, but that the series was poorly officiated. In his 2009 book Personal Foul: A First-Person Account of the Scandal That Rocked the NBA, Donaghy stated the following about the series, particularly about his supervisor during the series, Tommy Nuñez:

My favorite Tommy Nunez story is from the 2007 playoffs when the San Antonio Spurs were able to get past the Phoenix Suns in the second round. Of course, what many fans didn't know was that Phoenix had someone working against them behind the scenes. Nunez was the group supervisor for that playoff series, and he definitely had a rooting interest. Nunez loved the Hispanic community in San Antonio and had a lot of friends there. He had been a referee for 30 years and loved being on the road; in fact, he said that the whole reason he had become a group supervisor was to keep getting out of the house. So Nunez wanted to come back to San Antonio for the conference finals. Plus, he, like many other referees, disliked Suns owner Robert Sarver for the way he treated officials. Both of these things came into play when he prepared the referees for the games in the staff meetings. I remember laughing with him and saying, "You would love to keep coming back here." He was pointing out everything that Phoenix was able to get away with, and never once told us to look for anything in regard to San Antonio. Nunez should have a championship ring on his finger.

—

=== San Antonio v Cleveland ===
The 2007 NBA Finals had the lowest television ratings in NBA history, after the Spurs swept the Cleveland Cavaliers. Many fans expected a Pistons rematch with the Spurs. Rasheed Wallace claimed that the league wanted to make more money by featuring LeBron James in the Finals instead of the Pistons, to increase excitement.

I still don't think they beat us, we beat ourselves, and I think we also fell victim to that personal NBA thing where they are trying to make it a world game and get (television) ratings. They wanted to put their darling (LeBron) in there (the NBA Finals), and they did, and look what ended up happening. This game ain't basketball anymore, it's entertainment, it's starting to get like the WWF. There ain't no real wrestling anymore either. It's all fake.

— Rasheed Wallace during mid-season interview,

Despite his controversial statement, the Pistons appeared in the 2008 NBA Playoffs as a second seed, in which they managed to defeat the 76ers after rallying from a 2–1 deficit, beating Orlando in the next round 4–1, before reaching the Eastern Conference Finals again and ending up losing to eventual champion Boston Celtics for the third year in a row. That would lead to the demise of the team, when several players from their 2004 championship team either ended up departing or retiring.

=== Bulls v Celtics ===
During a 2009 playoff series between the Celtics and Bulls, many Bulls fans felt that the referees were favoring the Celtics. In Game 5, Celtics guard Rajon Rondo made hard contact with the face of Bulls' center Brad Miller, with 2 seconds left in overtime and the Celtics leading by two. Earlier in Game 5, Rondo tripped Bulls guard Kirk Hinrich, forcing him to get stitches. The hit on Miller left him with a bleeding mouth, but because the foul was ruled a personal foul, Miller had to shoot the free throws, or he would not be allowed to return, and the Celtics would get to pick the replacement shooter. Had the foul been ruled a flagrant, the Bulls would have been able to pick the replacement shooter. Miller missed the first free throw, and then had to deliberately miss the second to give the Bulls a chance to tie, but the free throw did not hit the rim, the Celtics got possession, and ran out the clock. Rondo admitted after the game that he did not have a play on the ball.

In Game 6, near the end of the first quarter, Rondo threw Hinrich into the scorer's table in a fashion similar to Robert Horry's body slam of Steve Nash two years earlier. Rondo was assessed a flagrant 1, which allowed him to stay in the game. A flagrant 2, would have meant an ejection (Horry's punishment for his similar foul). After both games, the league reviewed the incidents and decided not to suspend Rondo, while Horry earned a 2-game suspension. Orlando Magic center Dwight Howard was suspended for Game 6 of the Magic's series v the 76ers after the league reviewed tape of him elbowing Sixers center Samuel Dalembert in the head in Game 5. The game-time technical, after review was upgraded to a flagrant 2.

=== Magic v Lakers ===
The 2009 NBA Finals was one of the most forgettable matchups, featuring the Magic and Lakers. It was mockingly dubbed the Disney Series. Many fans believed the Magic should have won the championship instead of the Lakers, due to many calls claimed to have favoured the Lakers. The news hinted about Jameer Nelson returning to the lineup during the regular season, where he led the Magic to sweep the Lakers following a torn labrum in his right shoulder during a home game v Dallas on February 2, 2009. The series began in Los Angeles where the Lakers went up 2–0. A controversial Game 3 call on Dwight Howard after attempting to block Kobe Bryant raised questions about favoring the Lakers. Following the call, Bryant hit one of two free throws. The Lakers' terrible free-throw percentage led to Orlando winning that game.

In Game 4, the most intense moment came during the first half. The Magic took a 12-point lead. In the third quarter, the Lakers took the lead to 67–62. Stan Van Gundy came under heavy criticism for not letting Rafer Alston play, and for his decision of whether to foul Orlando with 11 seconds left, which ultimately led to their overtime downfall after Derek Fisher hit a pivotal 3-pointer to tie it at 87.

I thought we had a very, very bad third quarter, and then it wasn't so much one guy over the other. It was just we had a unit in the fourth quarter that I thought was playing real well. And then you get down to the point where Rafer hasn't played in 10 or 12 minutes. I thought it would be hard to bring him back. Jameer wasn't doing a whole lot, but he also wasn't hurting us at all. The unit had played pretty well so that's why I stayed with it.

— Stan Van Gundy after Game 4 interview

Another argument came during overtime, with Nelson and Lewis double-teaming Bryant. Nelson got hit by Bryant's elbow, but no foul was called. Fisher hit another 3-pointer that let the Lakers win the game and take a 3–1 lead. That raised questions about missed foul calls.

I doubt that [Kobe] did it on purpose, My ears are ringing right now. But the ref's not going to call that.

— Jameer Nelson after Game 4

Later on, Rafer Alston commented:

There were times he was out there cursing the refs out and they weren't calling technical fouls, I would get ejected [for that], but they won't eject Kobe.

— Rafer Alston after Game 4

The Lakers won game 5 for their 15th championship.

=== NBA draft ===
The 1985 NBA draft was the first to use the NBA draft lottery. Before that year, the league used a coin flip between the teams with the worst record in each conference to see which team would pick first. The Golden State Warriors finished with the worst record in the NBA during the 1984–85 season and would have had the first draft choice under the previous system. That year, Georgetown center Patrick Ewing was favored to be the number one pick. The lottery was established out of concern that the Houston Rockets had been intentionally playing poorly to draft the best players, such as centers Ralph Sampson and Hakeem Olajuwon in 1983 and 1984, respectively.

During the first live televised draft lottery ceremony, the league used a system where sealed envelopes representing the teams with the worst records were mixed in a tumbler, and then drawn by Commissioner Stern one at a time. According to a particularly popular urban legend, when these envelopes were added to the tumbler, one envelope was forced in and banged against the edge, bending the corner, while all the rest of the envelopes were set in gently. The large-market New York Knicks won and drafted Ewing. Nevertheless, the "bent envelope" fueled speculation that the league had staged the result. As a response, the NBA moved to the weighted lottery system in 1990, which gives the worst teams better odds at receiving the top 3 (later 4) picks. More updates came in 1994, when the Orlando Magic landed back-to-back #1 picks despite the fact that in the second year only one lottery combination would let them win it. In 2019, after the 76ers appeared to be tanking for multiple seasons for higher draft picks under Sam Hinkie's regime, the system was updated again.

==== Hometown heroes ====
For the 2003 NBA draft, the Cleveland Cavaliers and Denver Nuggets each had equal chances of drafting first overall, with the Cavaliers ultimately winning the right to draft Ohioan LeBron James. Speculation was rife that the lottery was rigged in favor of the Cavaliers. Following James' departure for the Heat, further speculation pointed to Cleveland's winning three out of four draft lotteries between 2011 and 2014, and that this led James to return to Cleveland in 2014.

For the 2008 NBA draft, despite only a 1.7% chance, the Chicago Bulls won the first overall pick and selected Chicago native Derrick Rose.

The New Orleans Hornets won the rights to the first overall selection in the 2012 draft. The Hornets were a league-owned team prior to the draft, leading to conspiracy theories about the lottery.

Further suspicions were raised in 2016 and 2017, where former 76er Dikembe Mutombo congratulated Philadelphia for winning the first overall pick in the 2016 draft early. Lakers president of basketball operations Magic Johnson and coach Luke Walton stated weeks before the lottery that the Lakers were going to get a top 3 pick in the 2017 draft despite having higher odds of losing the pick to Philadelphia. The latter selection had the Lakers be in prime position to take Lonzo Ball, a prime high school and college standout point guard from nearby Chino Hills, California, with his father LaVar talking about him being on the Lakers months before the event.

== Fines and suspensions ==
=== Criticism of referees and officiating ===
Players, coaches or front office members criticizing referees, officials or suggesting in any way that the league has conspiracy theories result in an automatic minimum fine of $25,000.

=== Gestures ===
Sam Cassell's Big Cahones dance celebration (from Major League II) are now seen as "obscene gestures". Among those who have been fined for "dancing" are Caron Butler, Andray Blatche, LeBron James, Marco Belinelli, Andre Iguodala, Jameer Nelson and Fred VanVleet. The minimum fine is $15,000.

=== Joey Crawford ===
Joey Crawford was once suspended by the league after a confrontation with Tim Duncan. Duncan was ejected for laughing on the sidelines in a game against the Mavericks in the 2006–07 season. After a meeting between Crawford and the league office, the NBA suspended Crawford for the remainder of the season and made him attend anger management courses.

== Gun incidents ==
On December 24, 2009, it was revealed that Gilbert Arenas had admitted to storing unloaded firearms in his locker at Verizon Center and had surrendered them to team security. Arenas violated NBA rules against bringing firearms into an arena and D.C. ordinances as well. On January 1, 2010, it was reported that Arenas and teammate Javaris Crittenton had unloaded guns in their locker rooms during a Christmas Eve argument over gambling debts. The D.C. Metropolitan Police and the U.S. Attorney's office investigated, and on January 14, 2010, Arenas was charged with carrying a pistol without a license. Arenas pled guilty on January 15.

On January 6, 2010, the NBA suspended Arenas indefinitely without pay. Commissioner Stern said that "his ongoing conduct has led me to conclude that he is not currently fit to take the court in an NBA game". Stern allegedly felt compelled to act when Arenas' teammates surrounded him during pregame introductions and he pretended to shoot them with guns made from his fingers. The Wizards issued a statement condemning the stunt as "unacceptable". On January 27, 2010, Arenas and Crittenton were suspended for the rest of the season, after meeting with Stern. Both players were removed from the team at the end of the season. Crittenton was waived and Arenas was traded to the Magic. Crittenton never returned to the NBA (later facing a manslaughter charge), while Arenas was amnestied a year later, before finishing his NBA career with the Memphis Grizzlies in 2012.

A decade later, Ja Morant faced a similar scenario when he flashed a gun on an Instagram livestream twice, although he did not bring a gun onto league property. Morant was suspended for 8 games for the first incident, and 25 for the second.

== Load management ==
Load management is a strategy used by NBA teams to manage the physical workload of their players throughout the regular season, with the aim of reducing the risk of injury and optimizing performance during the playoffs. The practice involves sitting star players out of games, limiting their minutes, and giving them additional rest days throughout the season.

Load management is seen by some as a necessary measure to ensure player health and success in the playoffs. Some people have pointed out that this is no different than Major League Baseball, which has a 162 game schedule. Starting players are sometimes given games off for rest, and it is rare for a player to play in all 162 games. Critics argue that load management goes against the spirit of competition, and that fans pay good money to see star players. Some questioned the effectiveness of load management, arguing that players may lose their rhythm and conditioning as a result of extended rest.

In November 2012, coach Popovich was fined $250,000 for sending four players home (including stars Tim Duncan, Tony Parker and Manu Ginóbili) before a nationally televised game against the defending champion Miami Heat. It was the Spurs' fourth game in five nights and sixth game in nine nights, all of which were on the road. Commissioner Stern released a letter claiming Popovich had done a disservice to the league, fans and Miami ticket buyers by not giving them the game they paid to see. Most disagreed with Stern, saying Miami fans were there to see LeBron James and the Heat, not the Spurs. Some claimed this to be a revenge move by Stern, who in the past had openly admitted he disliked the Spurs' success due to the lack of ratings they brought to the Finals as a small market team. The Spurs ended up leading for most of the game and lost only in the last minute, making Stern appear even more foolish for claiming the game was ruined before it even began. Stern later said that if Popovich had simply kept the players with the team he would not have fined him, which went against his initial claim that the product on the court was diminished by who did not play.

The incident called into question the league's scheduling practices, cramming so many games together, especially as in the Spurs' case where the team had to travel between games. Some called for an end to four-games-in-five-nights and five-games-in-seven-nights situations as it could put the players' health at risk and diminishes the product.

The NBA addressed these issues by moving the start of the regular season to mid-October and reducing the amount of back-to-back games. Teams continued the practice of resting healthy players, especially all-stars, in marquee matches in order to reduce injury risk and preserve their health. In the collective bargaining agreement starting with the 2023–24 NBA season, the league instituted a minimum 65 game requirement for players to be eligible to make awards such as All-NBA, All-Defense, and MVP. Commissioner Silver stated that he believed the rule was effective: "I can tell you that the number of games that players have participated in is up this season. And interestingly enough, injuries are actually down."

The controversy around load management became acute as stars such as Kawhi Leonard, LeBron James, and Kevin Durant rested for important regular season games. The NBA was dinged for not doing enough to prevent load management, and for failing to enforce its own rules around player rest.

== Microfiber game ball ==
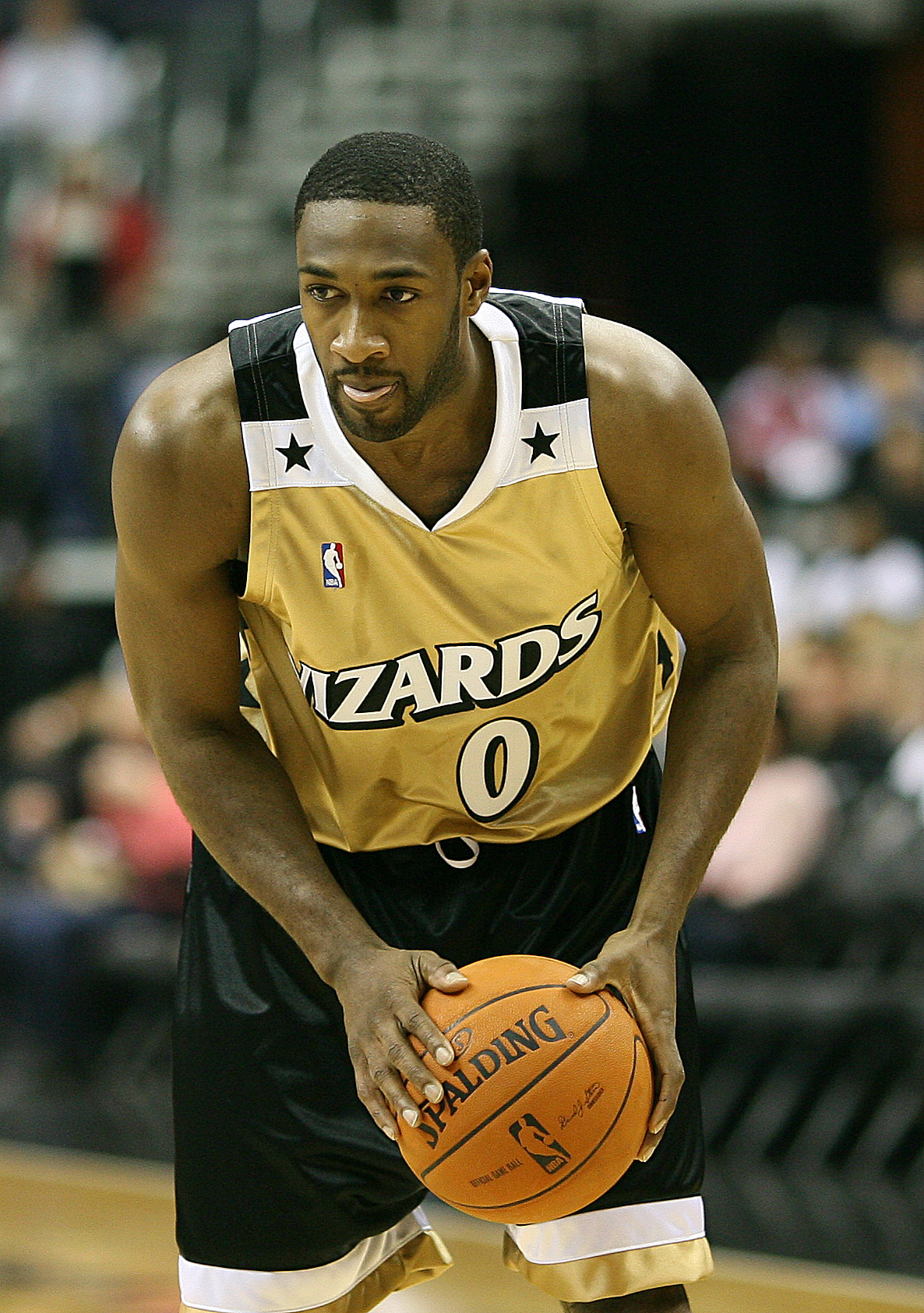
Despite the widespread criticism, Washington Wizards guard Gilbert Arenas (pictured November 2006) scored a career high 60 points with the microfiber ball

After the 2005–06 season, Stern announced that the league would use a new microfiber ball for the 2006–07 season. The microfiber ball replaced the previously used leather balls. The league claimed the new ball would provide better grip than the leather counterparts, especially when wet from player's sweat. Still the majority of players (notably Phoenix Suns point guard Steve Nash) expressed dislike for the new ball, saying among other things that it became slippery when wet, bounced awkwardly and gave players cuts.

The largest complaint came from the fact that players had not been consulted about the new ball. The NBA Players Association filed an unfair labor practice lawsuit against the league, dropping it after the league announced that it would revert to leather balls starting on January 1, 2007. In a humorous move, the Washington Wizards played a video on the Verizon Center scoreboard welcoming back the "new old ball". Despite complaints, scoring and field goal percentage went up while the microfiber ball was used. Some individual players, however, including Bulls guard Ben Gordon and Seattle SuperSonics guard Ray Allen, saw their typically high three-point shooting percentages decline.

A more rigorous study found that while shooting percentages increased, so did turnover rates.

== Network bias ==
During its twelve-year run covering the NBA, NBC Sports televised many games featuring the Chicago Bulls, New York Knicks and Los Angeles Lakers. In the prime-time slot, from 5:30 p.m EST to 8:00 p.m EST, NBC aired games almost exclusively featuring New York City, Chicago or Los Angeles (the top three US television markets). Fans and media analysts viewed this as favoritism, and fans of other large market teams objected when their teams were not featured on NBC, despite team success, such as the Houston Rockets, who were a perennial contender in the 90's.

During that period, the Bulls, Lakers, and Knicks played in six, four and two NBA Finals, respectively, every Finals featuring one or more of those teams except 1995. Until 1998, the Chicago Bulls were a dominant team, and during the early to mid-1990s, the New York Knicks were also in the NBA elite. From 1997 to 2002, the Los Angeles Lakers joined the ranks of the best in the NBA.

== No tolerance rule ==
At the start of the 2006–07 NBA season, the NBA instituted a new rule regarding in-game player complaints. The "no tolerance rule", as it was referred to by players and the media, allowed referees to call technical fouls when players complained too vehemently about calls.

The season started with a spike in the number of technical fouls and ejections. There were 104 technicals and seven ejections in the first fifty-one games, while only seven had no technical fouls". Carmelo Anthony was ejected on opening night of the season after two technical fouls.

Although Anthony wasn't looking at or speaking to referee Ted Washington, he received a second technical with the Nuggets behind by two points in the third quarter. He got the "T" for throwing his headband to the floor after being called for his fourth foul.

Some observers viewed the rule as taking the passion out of the game; others claimed that it only served to take pressure off of referees who made bad calls.

I don't like it. Basketball is an emotional game; guys are always going to express their thoughts about calls. ... There are times you are going to disagree. You shouldn't get a "T" for nit-picky things.

— Corliss Williamson, Sacramento Kings

Over-the-top complaints and gestures should certainly be penalized, but the rule goes too far. Does David Stern believe that disallowing the players' protests will fool fans into accepting the infallibility of the refs?

— Charley Rosen, Fox Sports

Others agreed with the rule, viewing it as a much needed policy to cut down on the whining.

Nobody likes the scowling, the arm-waving, the stomping and ball-slamming, certainly not after a meaningless call in the second quarter of some game in mid-November. And such ridiculousness was one reason why too many consumers perceived NBA players as self-absorbed, overbearing, churlish and out of touch. … Too many are out of touch with the people who pay the freight. Who pays to come to the arena to see this demonstrative complaining? Nobody. The notion some players have put forth, that the NBA is trying to take the emotion from the game, is so preposterous it's insulting.

— Michael Wilbon, The Washington Post

After the initial spike at the start of the season, the numbers declined significantly towards the middle of the year. Several players, including Allen Iverson, were ejected on technical fouls; Iverson's ejection came during his first game against his former team, the Philadelphia 76ers, and he was later fined by the league for claiming that referee Steve Javie ejected him on the basis of a supposed feud. .

== Race and culture ==
The NBA was criticized for embracing hip hop culture. While some observers have argued that this criticism has more to do with race than culture, the league has many links to hip hop culture. Rappers Nelly and Jay-Z had ownership stakes in NBA teams (the Charlotte Hornets and Brooklyn Nets, respectively), and many artists wore NBA throwback jerseys in music videos. The NBA plays rap and hip-hop tracks in arenas during games. NBA video games NBA 2K and NBA Live use hip-hop in their soundtracks, and ABC/ESPN also use the music. NBA players have pursued rap or hip hop careers themselves (such as Shaquille O'Neal, Kobe Bryant, Tony Parker, Allen Iverson, Chris Webber, Damian Lillard and Ron Artest).

Defenders of the association argued that such criticism is hypocritical, citing the relative lack of criticism of Major League Baseball (MLB), National Hockey League (NHL) or National Football League (NFL) players. Also, music and sports partnerships are not limited to the NBA, such as the NHL's association with alternative rock and hard rock, and NASCAR's association with country music.

=== Donald Sterling ===
==== Discrimination ====
In February 2009, Los Angeles Clippers owner Donald Sterling was sued by former longtime Clippers executive Elgin Baylor for employment discrimination on the basis of age and race. The lawsuit alleged Sterling told Baylor that he wanted to fill his team with "poor black boys from the South and a white head coach". The suit alleges that during negotiations for Danny Manning, Sterling said, "I'm offering a lot of money for a poor black kid." The suit noted those comments while alleging "the Caucasian head coach was given a four-year, $22 million contract", while Baylor's salary had "been frozen at a comparatively paltry $350,000 since 2003".

==== Racism ====
On April 25, 2014, TMZ Sports released what it said was an April 9, 2014 audio recording of a conversation between Sterling and his mistress, V. Stiviano. According to TMZ, Sterling and Stiviano argued over a photo Stiviano posted on Instagram in which she posed with Magic Johnson. Sterling allegedly told Stiviano, "It bothers me a lot that you want to broadcast that you're associating with black people." and, "You can sleep with [black people]. You can bring them in, you can do whatever you want", but "the little I ask you is ... not to bring them to my games". Clippers president Andy Roeser issued a statement the following day, stating that the sentiments attributed to Sterling did not reflect Sterling's views. The statement also said that the Sterling family was suing the woman on the recording and that she had "told Mr. Sterling that she would 'get even' with him". Soon after the Los Angeles chapter of the National Association for the Advancement of Colored People (NAACP) cancelled its plans award Sterling for a second time with its lifetime achievement award. Soon after, President Barack Obama characterized the recording attributed to Sterling as "incredibly offensive racist statements". Obama then stated, "When ignorant folks want to advertise their ignorance, you don't really have to do anything, you just let them talk." On April 29, the NBA confirmed the taped conversations and announced that Sterling was banned for life and fined US$2.5 million.

=== Dress code ===
The NBA instituted a dress code in 2005, banning all clothing associated with hip hop culture. The dress code was instantly controversial.

Players were instructed not to wear jewelry, throwback jerseys, headphones, indoor sunglasses and other accessories, and instead were told to wear "business casual" clothing. The dress code, characterized by some as "clearly and unapologetically directed toward suppressing hip-hop culture." Baggy shorts were also banned via a rule on the length of player's shorts while playing. Tights, which players started to wear under their shorts in the 2005–06 season (though not a symbol of hip hop culture) were banned as well. No players were fined for dress code violations during the 2005–06 season. The league attempted to further distance itself from hip hop since the infamous 'Malice at the Palace' brawl in 2004; in the 2005 NBA All-Star Game, country music stars Big and Rich performed at halftime, a move that was ridiculed by Charles Barkley. In addition, ABC Sports (after relying on hip-hop music early on) used artists such as Rob Thomas and Tom Petty for the NBA Finals.

Since Adam Silver became commissioner, however, the dress code was loosened somewhat, especially during and after the 2020 NBA Bubble. The sport coat was no longer required at games and during league and team activities. Many coaches wore Nike-produced polo shirts in place of suits and ties during games.

== Partnerships ==
As part of its November 2021 multi-year partnership deal with the United Arab Emirates (UAE), the NBA hosted two preseason games in Abu Dhabi on October 4 and 6, 2024, marking its third annual trip to the country. However, the Human Rights Watch (HRW) raised concerns, citing the UAE's pattern of using high-profile events to enhance its image. HRW accused the league of being complicit in "sportswashing" the UAE's poor human rights record, while the country seeks to display itself as open country, without addressing the abuses.

On September 30, HRW wrote a letter to the NBA, urging it to implement a human rights risk mitigation strategy, and to ensure that the preseason games were not used as a distraction from the UAE's human rights abuses. The rights organization also pointed out that the UAE hosted the games amidst the reports of the country being directly involved in fuelling the Sudanese civil war. A coalition of human rights groups called upon the NBA to cancel the games in Abu Dhabi in solidarity with Sudanese.

== Protests ==
=== 2019–2020 Hong Kong protests ===
In early October 2019, Houston Rockets general manager Daryl Morey tweeted support for the protests. The NBA subsequently apologized, saying the tweet was "regrettable". The perceived inadequacy of the NBA's response and double standard relative to the league's history of political activism were criticized by US politicians and third-party observers; critics compared the incident to an October 2 South Park episode "Band in China" which parodied the self-censorship of the American entertainment industry to meet Chinese censorship demands. The statement also drew criticism from mainland Chinese state-run media for insufficiency and led to the suspension/termination of all mainland Chinese sponsors of the NBA. Republican and Democratic congress members, including Julian Castro, Marco Rubio and Ted Cruz publicly criticized both Chinese and NBA actions. Commissioner Silver later defended the league's response, supporting Morey's right to freedom of expression while accepting the right of reply from China.

=== George Floyd protests ===
Following a four-month hiatus, the NBA resumed play in August 2020 at the Bubble held at Walt Disney World during the COVID-19 pandemic. During the build-up to the closed-door tournament, the murder of George Floyd in May and the resurgence of Black Lives Matter protests during that time forced the NBA's hand, pushing it to stand with its majority-Black player base. The league permitted players to wear league-approved messages on the back of their jerseys, and relaxed their long-standing position on not standing for the U.S. national anthem. The league also painted "BLACK LIVES MATTER" at center court for their venues for the tournament.

Critics attacked the NBA for its public embracement of the movement. When Jonathan Isaac, an Orlando Magic player and a devout Evangelical Christian, refused to kneel during the anthem in solidarity with his teammates or wear the team-approved "Black Lives Matter" t-shirt given to him, sales of his jersey rose in approval. On the other hand, San Antonio Spurs head coach Gregg Popovich and Miami Heat player Meyers Leonard received criticism for doing the same, though they wore Black Lives Matter teeshirts while standing.

=== NBA player walkout ===
In response to the shooting of Jacob Blake in Kenosha, Wisconsin, NBA players in the midst of the playoffs anchored a wildcat protest strike, setting off a chain reaction throughout North American sports where no professional games were played in any major league on August 26. The league and its players formed several initiatives in the wake of the walkout, notably a pledge to turn several NBA venues into voting sites for the upcoming U.S. presidential election.

=== 2020 NBA Finals ratings ===
The record-low ratings for the 2020 NBA Finals, which saw the Los Angeles Lakers defeat the Miami Heat in six games, were widely panned by apolitical pundits and conservative critics, with myriad theories given as to why the ratings for the event dropped 65% from 2019. Some cited the NBA's embrace of Black Lives Matter, while others cited the unfamiliar time of year, during the MLB postseason and the NFL regular season—two traditional fall events—that undercut casual fan interest, as opposed to the traditionally robust numbers the NBA finals in June. Commentators such as Bobby Burack, a columnist for Outkick, attributed the NBA ratings to the league's "woke" politics, cord-cutting, and the lack of playing time for star players. By contrast, Dan McQuade of Defector Media stated that critics of NBA players who express their personal political views on the court were relying on racist "coded language", likening it to the dress code controversy.

== Selective replays ==
Despite TV replays, as of the 2013–14 season, plays were not reviewable unless they were end of quarter plays, as well as the last 2 minutes of regulation and overtime. In many cases, referees opted not to review final plays of the game, which could have impact on the outcome. In the 2013–14 season, regular season games such as the Heat-Pacers, Mavericks-Timberwolves, Mavericks-Pelicans, Clippers-Mavericks resulted in controversial final calls that changed the outcome. In some cases, the NBA issued official statements after the game, admitting to the errors; however, outcomes were unchanged. Many believe that such statements were made as a PR move, without action to improve the integrity of the game.

Many criticize excessive time spent on replays that should have been resolved quickly. The league is claimed to intentionally operate in a way to damage perception of replays, as well as exaggerating their image of trying to keep the game honest.

== Sports betting and illegal gambling ==
=== Referee gambling scandal ===
In July 2007, reports of an investigation by the Federal Bureau of Investigation (FBI) were made public, which alleged that during the 2005–06 and 2006–07 NBA seasons, referee Tim Donaghy bet on games in which he officiated. On August 15, 2007, Donaghy pleaded guilty to two federal charges related to the investigation, and a year later he was sentenced to 15 months in prison and three years of supervised release.

=== Sports betting ===
Prior to the 2010s, the NBA was particularly sensitive to gambling due to the Donaghy scandal in the mid-2000s. However, the NBA's position on sports betting reversed.

The NBA, along with the NFL, MLB, NHL and the U.S. Justice Department brought suit against the State of New Jersey to stop the legalization of sports betting in 2012. They argued that New Jersey's plan was in direct violation of the Professional and Amateur Sports Protection Act (PASPA). In 2018, the U.S. Supreme Court ruled that PASPA was unconstitutional Murphy v. NCAA. This ruling allowed each state to choose whether to legalize sports betting. As of January 2023, Washington D.C. and 36 other states had legalized sports betting with 3 states in the legalization process.

Commissioner Silver took a role in the legalization. In a The New York Times op-ed in 2014, Silver wrote about legalizing sports betting. He argued that sports betting should be allowed on a federal level as long as the states complied with strict rules. He acknowledged that it was an untapped business that was thriving without regulation or oversight. Regulations that Silver proposed included minimum-age verification and methods to gambling addicts from betting. Silver and the leadership team largely viewed sports betting as a potential positive, especially given uniform laws.

In 2019, the NBA signed a multi-year deal with MGM Resorts making them the official gaming partner of the NBA and WNBA. This allowed the NBA to negotiate deals with other sports operators that operate in states that have legalized sports betting and those that had not. Since 2019, the NBA also signed betting data partnerships with both Sportradar and Genius Sports which generated extra revenue.

=== 2025 gambling scandal and arrests ===
On October 23, 2025, Miami Heat player Terry Rozier, Portland Trail Blazers head coach Chauncey Billups, and former player Damon Jones were arrested by the FBI in connection with a wider federal investigation into sports betting and gambling by various crime families of the American Mafia. This followed a 2024 scandal in which former Toronto Raptors players Jontay Porter was banned from the NBA and pleaded guilty to conspiracy to commit wire fraud after disclosing confidential information to bettors, exiting games early for betting purposes, and betting on NBA games.

== Team relocation ==
=== Vancouver Grizzlies ===
After the 2000–01 NBA season the Vancouver Grizzlies moved to Memphis, Tennessee. On January 25, 2001, Michael Heisley purchased the team. Originally he stated that he intended to keep the team in Vancouver. However, the team moved, in part due to the weak Canadian dollar, lack of local ownership, and the unwillingness of some players to live in Canada. After a bidding war between Memphis, Louisville, Anaheim and New Orleans, Heisley selected Memphis on March 26, 2001. The NBA Board of Governors approved the team's plans to move to Memphis on July 4, 2001, and the team became the Memphis Grizzlies for the 2001–02 NBA season.

=== Seattle SuperSonics ===
After the 2007–08 NBA season the Seattle SuperSonics moved to Oklahoma City. After failed efforts to persuade Washington state government officials to funds to update KeyArena, the SuperSonics' were sold to Professional Basketball Club LLC (PBC), an investment group headed by Oklahoma City businessman Clay Bennett. After a failed attempt to persuade local governments to fund a $500 million arena complex, Bennett's group notified the NBA that it intended to move the team to Oklahoma City and requested arbitration with the city of Seattle to be released from its lease with KeyArena. When the request was rejected by a judge, Seattle sued Bennett's group to enforce the lease that required the team to play in KeyArena through 2010. On July 2, 2008, a settlement was reached that allowed the team to move under certain conditions. Details of the settlement revealed that PBC would pay the city of Seattle $45 million immediately in exchange for breaking the lease and an additional $30 million if Seattle did not receive a replacement team in five years. Also, the Sonics' name and colors could not be used by the team, but could be taken by a future Seattle team. The Oklahoma City team would retain the franchise history of the SuperSonics, which could be "shared" with any future NBA team in Seattle. The team became the Oklahoma City Thunder for the 2008–09 NBA season.

== See also ==
- NFL controversies
- Criticism of NASCAR
